= Buck Creek =

Buck Creek may refer to the following geographic features in the United States:

== Settlements ==
- Buck Creek, Indiana
- Buck Creek, Kansas
- Buck Creek, Missouri
- Buck Creek, Wisconsin
- Buck Creek Township, Hancock County, Indiana

== Rivers ==
- Alabama
  - Buck Creek (Cahaba River tributary)
- Iowa
  - Buck Creek (Mississippi River)
  - Buck Creek (Pechman Creek tributary)
- Michigan
  - Buck Creek (Kent County, Michigan), tributary of the Grand River
- Missouri
  - Buck Creek (Black River)
  - Buck Creek (Cuivre River)
  - Buck Creek (Joachim Creek)
  - Buck Creek (Morgan County, Missouri)
- Ohio
  - Buck Creek (Ohio), tributary of the Mad River
- Oklahoma
  - Buck Creek (Kiamichi River tributary)
- Oregon
  - Buck Creek (Rogue River tributary)
- Pennsylvania
  - Buck Creek (Delaware River)
