= Barnett, Missouri =

- City
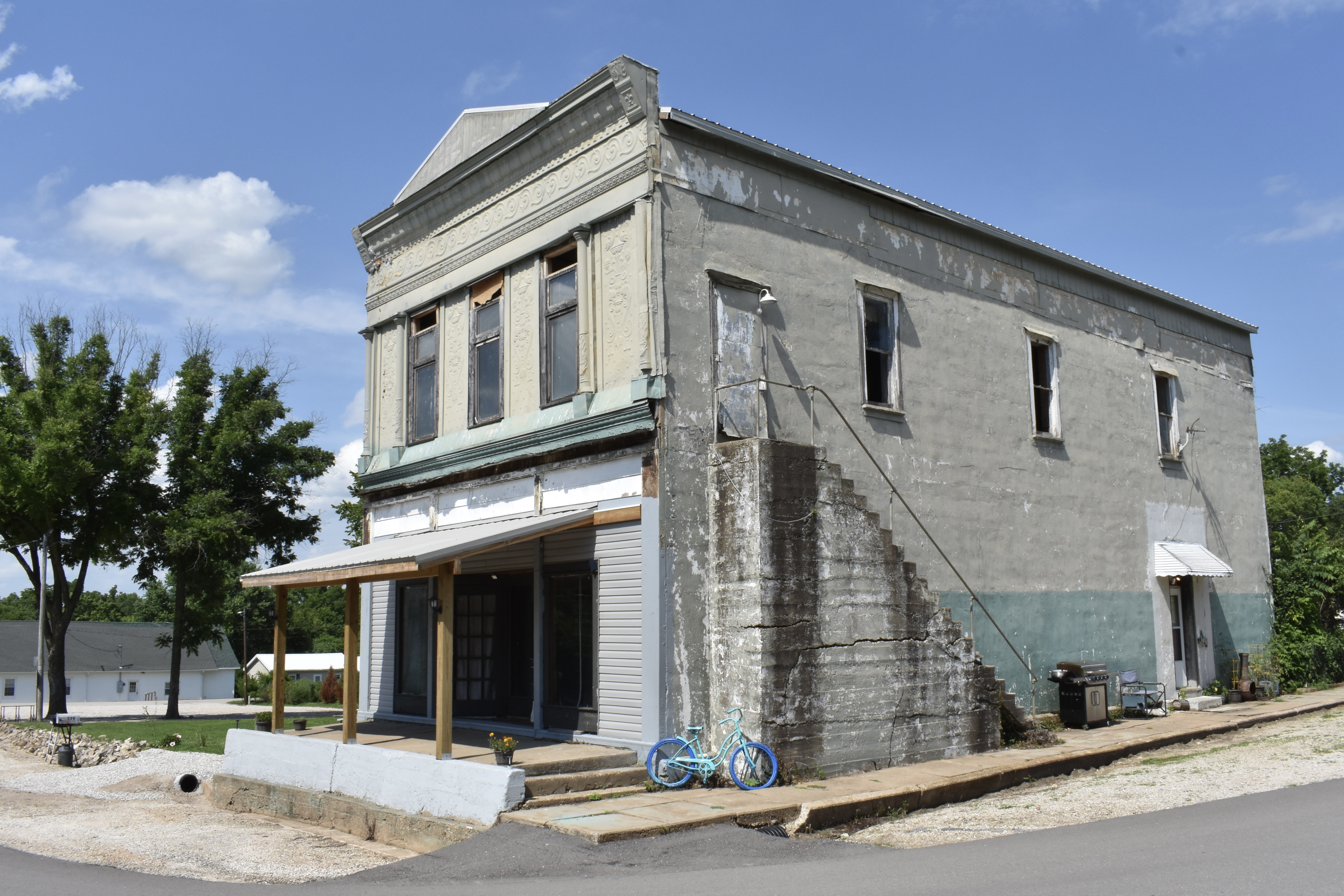

- Location in Morgan County and the state of Missouri
- Coordinates: 38°22′37″N 92°40′29″W
- Country: United States
- State: Missouri
- County: Morgan

Area
  - Total: 0.27 sq mi (0.71 km^{2})
  - Land: 0.27 sq mi (0.71 km^{2})
  - Water: 0 sq mi (0.00 km^{2})
- Elevation: 974 ft (297 m)

Population (2020)
  - Total: 158
  - Density: 579.2/sq mi (223.63/km^{2})
- Time zone: UTC-6 (Central (CST))
  - Summer (DST): UTC-5 (CDT)
- ZIP code: 65011
- Area code: 573
- FIPS code: 29-03376
- GNIS feature ID: 2394066
- Website: www.barnettmo.org

Barnett is a city in Morgan County, Missouri, United States. The population was 158 at the 2020 census, down from 203 in 2010.

== History ==
Variant names were "Stone House" and "Barnetsville". A post office called Stone House was established in 1858, and the name was changed to Barnetsville in 1875. For a brief period of time, the name was Marysville, after a citizen named Mary Justice. The name changed to Barnett in 1880, when the town was rebuilt following a tornado. The present name is after one Mr. Barnet, an early settler.

The Jesse Ratcliff House was listed on the National Register of Historic Places in 1982.

== Geography ==
Barnett is in eastern Morgan County on the south side of Missouri Route 52, which leads northwest 11 miles (18 km) to Versailles, the county seat, and southeast 6 miles (10 km) to Eldon. According to the U.S. Census Bureau, Barnett has a total area of 0.27 square miles (0.70 km^{2}), all land. The city sits on a ridge which drains north to Wilkes Creek, an east-flowing tributary of South Moreau Creek, part of the Moreau River watershed; and south to Indian Creek, which flows southwest to the Lake of the Ozarks on the Osage River. The Moreau and Osage Rivers are tributaries of the Missouri River.

== Demographics ==
Historical population
Census	Pop.	Note	%±
1910	118		—
1920	221		87.3%
1930	242		9.5%
1940	239		−1.2%
1950	200		−16.3%
1960	200		0.0%
1970	167		−16.5%
1980	203		21.6%
1990	215		5.9%
2000	207		−3.7%
2010	203		−1.9%
2020	158		−22.2%
U.S. Decennial Census

=== 2010 census ===
As of the census of 2010, there were 203 people, 81 households, and 56 families living in the city. The population density was 751.9 inhabitants per square mile (290.3/km^{2}). There were 96 housing units at an average density of 355.6 per square mile (137.3/km^{2}). The racial makeup of the city was 93.6% White, 3.4% Native American, 0.5% Asian, and 2.5% from two or more races. Hispanic or Latino of any race were 3.4% of the population.

There were 81 households, of which 30.9% had children under the age of 18 living with them, 56.8% were married couples living together, 11.1% had a female householder with no husband present, 1.2% had a male householder with no wife present, and 30.9% were non-families. 28.4% of all households were made up of individuals, and 11.1% had someone living alone who was 65 years of age or older. The average household size was 2.51 and the average family size was 3.04.

The median age in the city was 44.1 years. 23.6% of residents were under the age of 18; 7.4% were between the ages of 18 and 24; 20.6% were from 25 to 44; 34% were from 45 to 64; and 14.3% were 65 years of age or older. The gender makeup of the city was 55.2% male and 44.8% female.

=== 2000 census ===
As of the census of 2000, there were 207 people, 78 households, and 52 families living in the city. The population density was 757.6 inhabitants per square mile (292.5/km^{2}). There were 88 housing units at an average density of 322.1 per square mile (124.4/km^{2}). The racial makeup of the city was 97.58% White, 0.48% African American, 0.48% Native American, 0.97% Asian, and 0.48% from two or more races.

There were 78 households, out of which 37.2% had children under the age of 18 living with them, 46.2% were married couples living together, 10.3% had a female householder with no husband present, and 33.3% were non-families. 29.5% of all households were made up of individuals, and 11.5% had someone living alone who was 65 years of age or older. The average household size was 2.65 and the average family size was 3.12.

In the city the population was spread out, with 28.4% under the age of 18, 9.7% from 18 to 24, 26.2% from 25 to 44, 22.7% from 45 to 64, and 13.0% who were 65 years of age or older. The median age was 32 years. For every 100 females there were 107.0 males. For every 100 females age 18 and over, there were 89.7 males.

The median income for a household in the city was $26,023, and the median income for a family was $28,750. Males had a median income of $21,250 versus $23,214 for females. The per capita income for the city was $11,499. About 7.7% of families and 12.7% of the population were below the poverty line, including 22.2% of those under the age of eighteen and 17.2% of those 65 or over.
