= Haw Creek =

Haw Creek may refer to:

- Haw Creek (Morgan County, Missouri), a stream in Missouri
- Haw Creek (Salt River), a stream in Missouri
- Haw Creek (Haw River tributary), a stream in Alamance County, North Carolina
- Haw Creek Township (disambiguation)
