= Missouri Route 135 =

State highway in Missouri, U.S.

Route 135
- MO 135 highlighted in red

Route information
- Maintained by MoDOT
- Length: 70.627 mi (113.663 km)

Major junctions
- South end: Route 5 northwest of Sunrise Beach
- US 50 near Smithton
- North end: I-70 / US 40 / Route 41 west of Boonville

Location
- Country: United States
- State: Missouri

Highway system
- Missouri State Highway System; Interstate; US; State; Supplemental
← Route 134	→ US 136

Route 135 is a highway in central Missouri. Its northern terminus is at Interstate 70/U.S. Route 40/Route 41 west of Boonville; its southern terminus is at Route 5 near the Lake of the Ozarks in Laurie.

It passes through Cooper, Pettis, and Morgan counties. Southbound Route 135 runs concurrent with eastbound US 50 in Pettis and Morgan counties, with northbound Route 135 running concurrent with westbound US 50 over the same portion of US 50. Ozarks International Raceway is located along the highway. It serves Laurie, Proctor, Stover, Florence and Pilot Grove.

== Major intersections ==
County	Location	mi	km	Destinations	Notes
Morgan	Laurie	0.000	0.000	Route 5 – Laurie, Gravois Mills	
Morgan	Stover	20.651	33.235	Route 52 east – Versailles	Southern end of Route 52 overlap
Morgan	Haw Creek Township	22.348	35.966	Route 52 west – Cole Camp	Northern end of Route 52 overlap
Morgan	Richland Township	42.069	67.703	US 50 east – Syracuse	Southern end of US 50 overlap
Pettis	Smithton Township	44.419	71.485	US 50 west – Smithton	Northern end of US 50 overlap
Cooper	Boonville Township	70.559– 70.627	113.554– 113.663	I-70 / US 40 – Columbia, Kansas City Route 41 north	Roadways continues as Route 41
1.000 mi = 1.609 km; 1.000 km = 0.621 mi: Concurrency terminus
