= Soap Creek (Missouri) =

Stream in the U.S. state of Missouri

Soap Creek is a stream in Morgan County in the U.S. state of Missouri. It is a tributary to the Lake of the Ozarks.

The stream headwaters arise at 38°16′09″N 92°54′09″W and it flows generally east to its confluence with the waters of Lake of the Ozarks at 38°16′26″N 92°48′44″W. The source area lies just east of Missouri Route 135 and it passes under Missouri Route 5 approximately three miles south of Gravois Mills, Missouri just before entering the Lake. Prior to flooding of the lake the stream entered Gravois Creek about 2.5 miles further east.

Soap Creek was so named on account of deposits of soapstone in the area.

== See also ==
- List of rivers of Missouri
