= Missouri Route 52 =

State highway in Missouri, U.S.

Route 52

Route information
- Maintained by MoDOT
- Length: 176.603 mi (284.215 km)
- Existed: 1926–present

Major junctions
- West end: K-52 at the Kansas state line in Amoret
- I-49 / US 71 in Butler; US 65 south of Sedalia; US 54 southeast of Eldon
- East end: Route 133 east of St. Elizabeth

Location
- Country: United States
- State: Missouri

Highway system
- Missouri State Highway System; Interstate; US; State; Supplemental
← Route 51	→ Route 53

Route 52 is an east/west highway running from its eastern terminus at Route 133 7 miles (11 km) east of St. Elizabeth to the Kansas state line where it continues as K-52 (this road continues for 23 additional miles). Highway 52 comprises 173 miles (278 km) of primarily two-lane roadway in Missouri.

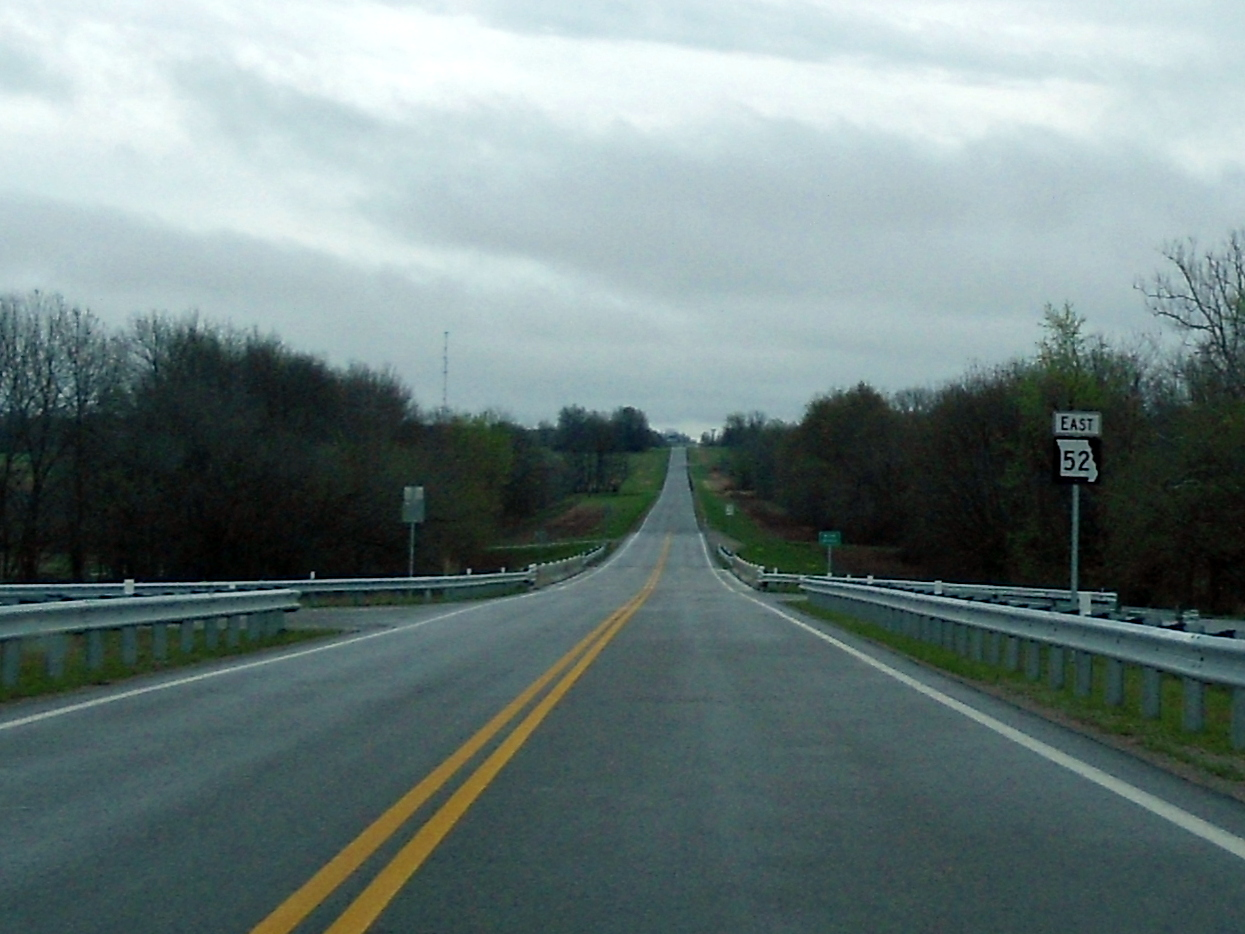
Missouri Route 52 eastbound shortly after ending a concurrency with I-49/US 71.

== Route description ==
Route 52 is largely a two-lane highway for its entirety except for the concurrency with I-49/US 71, Route 13 and US 65. A portion through Versailles and Eldon has a center lane for left turning.

Route 52 begins at the Kansas state line from a continuation from K-52. It shares a brief concurrency with I-49 on the west side of Butler. After leaving I-49 it passes through Deepwater then it shares a concurrency with Route 13. It passes through Clinton where it leaves Route 13. Route 52 intersects with Route 2 in Windsor. Route 52 shares a concurrency with US 65. After leaving US 65, Route 52 passes through Cole Camp, Stover, and Versailles where it has a concurrency with Route 5. It leaves Route 5 and then passes through Marvin, Barnett, and Eldon before crossing US 54. It passes through Tuscumbia then it crosses the Osage River with a concurrency with Route 17. After leaving Route 17, it passes through St. Elizabeth then it ends at Route 133.

== History ==
Route 52 was formerly Route 24 between Eldon and the Kansas state line. The numbering change was to avoid duplication with the new U.S. Route 24 which came through Missouri in 1926.

== Major intersections ==
County	Location	mi	km	Destinations	Notes
Bates		0.000	0.000	K-52 west to US-69	Continuation into Kansas
Bates		15.141	24.367	I-49 / US 71 – Kansas City, Joplin	I-49 exit 131
Bates	Butler	15.954	25.675	I-49 BL north (South Orange Street)	Western end of I-49 Bus. overlap
Bates		17.223	27.718	I-49 north / US 71 north – Kansas City I-49 BL ends	Westbound exit and eastbound entrance; eastern end of I-49 Bus. overlap; western end of I-49 / US 71 overlap; Route 52 west follows exit 130
Bates		18.653	30.019	I-49 south / US 71 – Joplin	Eastern end of I-49 / US 71 overlap; Route 52 east follows exit 129
St. Clair	No major junctions				
Henry	Deepwater	55.090	88.659	Route 52 Bus. east – Deepwater	
Henry		56.027	90.167	Route 13 south – Springfield	Interchange; western end of Route 13 overlap
Henry		57.087	91.873	Route 52 Bus. west – Deepwater	
Henry	Clinton	64.159	103.254	Route 7 south / Route 18 west – Clinton, Warrensburg	Western end of Route 7 overlap. Access to Historic Downtown Clinton
Henry	Clinton	65.636	105.631	Route 7 north / Route 13 north – Warrensburg, Clinton	Interchange; eastern end of Route 7 / Route 13 overlap. Access to Golden Valley Memorial Hospital.
Henry	Windsor	82.076	132.089	Route 2 west (Benton Street)	
Pettis		87.568	140.927	Route 127 north – Green Ridge	
Benton–Pettis county line	Windsor Junction	95.795	154.167	US 65 north – Sedalia	Western end of US 65 overlap
Benton	Cole Camp Junction	100.936	162.441	US 65 south – Warsaw	Interchange; eastern end of US 65 overlap
Morgan		115.794	186.352	Route 135 north – Florence	Western end of Route 135 overlap
Morgan	Stover	117.491	189.083	Route 135 south to Route 5 – Business District	Eastern end of Route 135 overlap
Morgan	Versailles	125.278	201.615	Route 5 south / Route W – Gravois Mills	Western end of Route 5 overlap; roundabout opened October 2025
Morgan		127.982	205.967	Route 5 north – Tipton	Eastern end of Route 5 overlap
Miller	Eldon	143.235	230.514	US 54 Bus.	Western end of US 54 Bus. overlap
Miller		146.244	235.357	US 54 / US 54 Bus. ends – Jefferson City, Lake of the Ozarks	Interchange; eastern end of US 54 Bus. overlap
Miller	Tuscumbia	155.896	250.890	Route 17 north – Eugene	Western end of Route 17 overlap
Miller		156.772	252.300	Route 17 south – Iberia, Fort Leonard Wood	Eastern end of Route 17 overlap
Maries		176.603	284.215	Route 133 – Meta, Crocker	
1.000 mi = 1.609 km; 1.000 km = 0.621 mi: Concurrency terminus
