= Buck Creek, Missouri =

Unincorporated community in Missouri

Coordinates: 38°13′53″N 92°46′07″W

Buck Creek is an unincorporated community in Morgan County, in the U.S. state of Missouri. The community is on Missouri Route O about four miles northeast of Laurie. The location is just west of the Gravois Creek Arm of the Lake of the Ozarks.

The community once had the Buck Creek School, now defunct. The schoolhouse took its name from nearby Buck Creek.
