= Big Buffalo Creek (Missouri) =

Stream in Missouri

Location
- Country: United States
- State: Missouri
- District: Benton and Morgan counties

Physical characteristics
- Source: Morgan County
  - coordinates: 38°24′02″N 93°01′53″W
  - elevation: 1,060 ft (320 m)
- Mouth: Big Buffalo Cove, Lake of the Ozarks
  - location: Benton County, Missouri
  - coordinates: 38°16′38″N 93°05′25″W
  - elevation: 659 ft (201 m)

Basin features
- Tributaries
  - left: Minnow Branch
  - right: Archer Creek

Big Buffalo Creek is a stream in Morgan and Benton counties in west-central Missouri. It is a tributary of the Osage River within the Lake of the Ozarks.

The stream headwaters arises just south of a fish hatchery about three miles southwest of Stover. The stream flows south and southwest passing south of Boylers Mill to enter Benton County and the Big Buffalo Creek Conservation Area. The stream turns to the south and enters the waters of Lake of the Ozarks at the community of Zora. Prior to the filling of the lake the stream channel met the Osage River just south of the community of Riverview.

The stream name was to distinguish it from Little Buffalo Creek which is also in Buffalo Township in Morgan County.
