= Pyrmont, Missouri =

Unincorporated community in Missouri, U.S.

Coordinates: 38°30′32″N 93°01′11″W

Pyrmont is an unincorporated community in western Morgan County, in the U.S. state of Missouri. The community is located just east of Missouri Route 135 approximately midway between Stover to the south and Florence to the northeast. Gabriel Creek flows past to the east.

== History ==
A post office called Pyrmont was established in 1878, and remained in operation until 1911. It is uncertain why the name "Pyrmont" was applied to this community.
