= Proctor Creek =

Proctor Creek may refer to:

- Proctor Creek (Chattahoochee River tributary), a stream in Georgia
- Proctor Creek (Missouri), a stream in Missouri
- Metropolitan Atlanta Rapid Transit Authority's Green Line (for which it was named), a spur line serving only Bankhead station
- Puget Creek near Tacoma, Washington
