= Pyrmont =

Pyrmont may refer to:

- Bad Pyrmont, a spa town in northern Germany
- Pyrmont, Indiana, United States
- Pyrmont, Missouri, United States
- Pyrmont, New South Wales, a suburb of Sydney, Australia
- Pyrmont Bridge, a landmark connecting Pyrmont to Sydney in Australia
- Pyrmont, Ohio, United States
- Pyrmont, Albany, a heritage listed building in Western Australia

== See also ==
- Piermont (disambiguation)
