= Moreau Township, Morgan County, Missouri =

Township in the US state of Missouri

Coordinates: 38.4267°N 92.7511°W

Moreau Township is a township in Morgan County, in the U.S. state of Missouri.

Moreau Township takes its name from South Moreau Creek.
