= Old St. Patrick's Church (Gravois Mills, Missouri) =

Historic church in Missouri, United States

- U.S. National Register of Historic Places
- Location within Missouri Location within the United States
- Location: South of Gravois Mills on Route 0, near Gravois Mills, Missouri
- Coordinates: 38.21208°N 92.82567°W
- Area: 3.1 acres (1.3 ha)
- Built: 1868-1870
- Built by: Fitzpatrick, Tom
- NRHP reference No.: 79001384
- Added to NRHP: March 2, 1979

Old St. Patrick's Church, also known as The Stone St. Patrick's Church, is a historic Roman Catholic church located near Gravois Mills, Morgan County, Missouri. It was built between 1868 and 1870, and is a one-story, rectangular masonry structure with a one-story, L-shaped stone addition. The church measures 24 feet, 3 inches, wide and 44 feet long.

It was listed on the National Register of Historic Places in 1979.
