= Proctor Creek (Missouri) =

Location
- Country: The United States of America
- State: Missouri
- Region: Morgan County

Basin features
- River system: Osage River

Proctor Creek is a stream in Morgan County in the U.S. state of Missouri. It is a tributary to the Osage River within the Lake of the Ozarks.

The stream headwaters arise adjacent to Missouri Route 135 at 38°18′48″N 92°56′09″W and an elevation of approximately 980 feet (300 m). The stream flows south to enter the Osage River within the Lake of the Ozarks adjacent to the community of Proctor at 38°15′11″N 92°56′44″W and an elevation of 202 feet (62 m).

Proctor Creek has the name of Benjamin Proctor, an early citizen.

== See also ==
- List of rivers of Missouri
