= Missouri saddled darter =

Conservation status
- Least Concern (IUCN 3.1)

Scientific classification
- Kingdom: Animalia
- Phylum: Chordata
- Class: Actinopterygii
- Order: Perciformes
- Family: Percidae
- Genus: Etheostoma
- Species: E. tetrazonum

Binomial name
- Etheostoma tetrazonum (Hubbs & J.D. Black, 1940)

Species of fish

The Missouri saddled darter (Etheostoma tetrazonum) is a species of freshwater ray-finned fish, a darter from the subfamily Etheostomatinae, part of the family Percidae, which also contains the perches, ruffes and pikeperches. It is endemic to Missouri, where it occurs in the Ozarks from the Gasconade River to the Osage and Moreau rivers. It occurs in fast gravel and rubble riffles of small to medium rivers. This species can reach a length of 9.0 cm (3.5 in).
