= Soap Creek =

Soap Creek may refer to the following places:

- Soap Creek (Des Moines River tributary)
- Soap Creek (Missouri)
- Texas:
  - Soap Creek (Witchita River tributary)
  - Soap Creek (Mountain Creek tributary)

== See also ==
- Soap (disambiguation)
