= Martin Hotel (Versailles, Missouri) =

- U.S. National Register of Historic Places
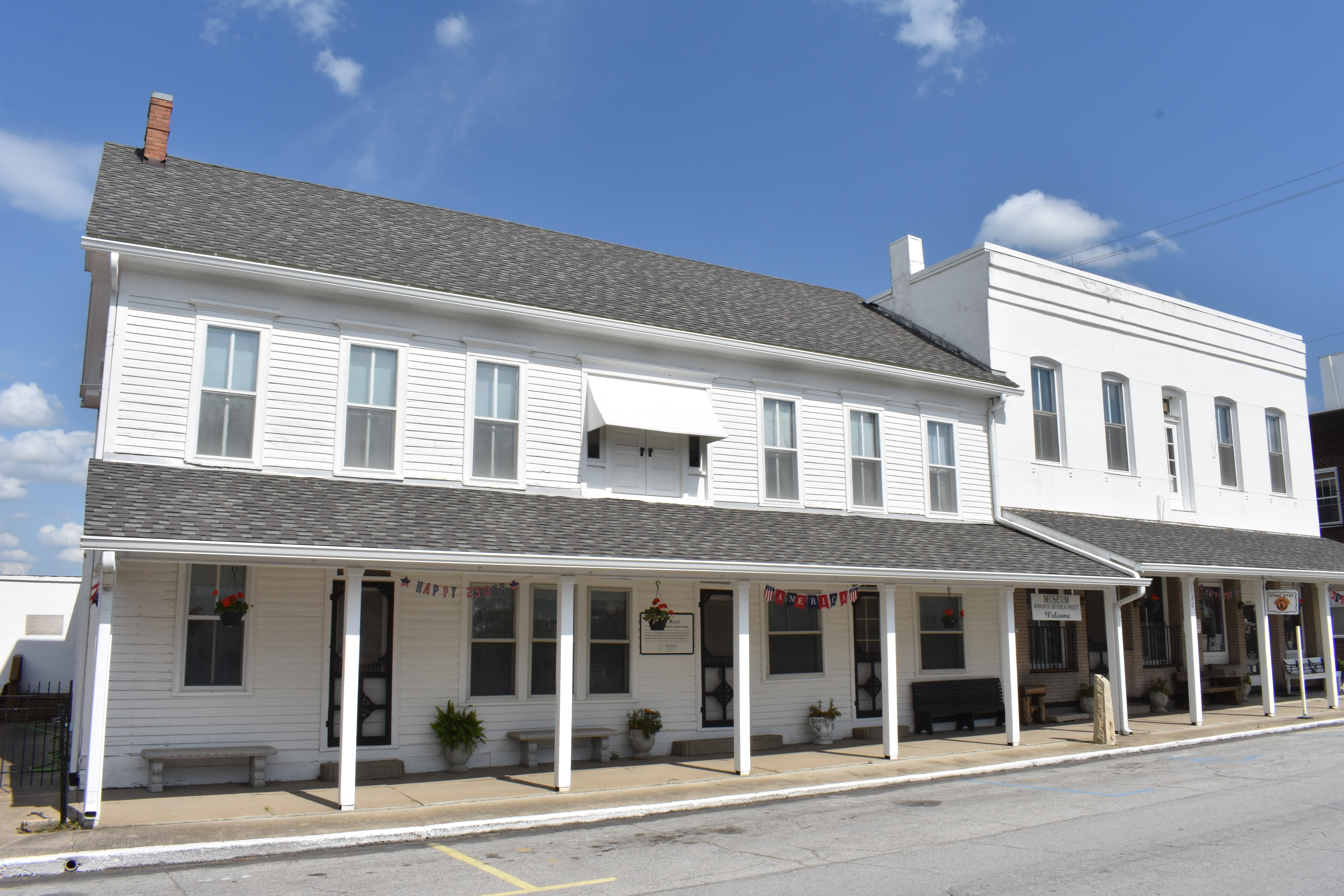
- Martin Hotel in June 2026

- Location within Missouri Location within the United States
- Location: 118 N. Monroe St., Versailles, Missouri
- Coordinates: 38°25′57″N 92°50′29″W
- Area: 0.2 acres (0.081 ha)
- Built: 1877
- NRHP reference No.: 78001669
- Added to NRHP: September 6, 1978

Martin Hotel, also known as the Morgan Co. Historical Museum, is a historic hotel building located at Versailles, Morgan County, Missouri. The original two-story frame section was built in 1877, with a two-story brick section added in 1884. The buildings form a modified "U"-plan. The building has housed the Morgan Co. Historical Museum since 1967.

It was listed on the National Register of Historic Places in 1978.
