= Gravois Creek =

Stream in Missouri, United States

- Interactive map of Gravois Creek
- Location: Morgan County, Missouri
- Primary outflows: Lake of the Ozarks

Gravois Creek (/ˈɡrævəz/ GRAV-əz) is a stream in south central Morgan County, Missouri. It is a tributary of the Osage River within the Lake of the Ozarks.

The stream headwaters arise along the east side of Missouri Route 135 approximately 3.5 miles south of Stover at 38°23′26″N 92°59′28″W at an elevation of approximately 1100 feet. The stream flows east to southeast passing under Missouri Route 5 to enter the waters of the Lake of the Ozarks at Gravois Mills at 38°19′13″N 92°49′38″W and an elevation of 663 feet. Prior to the impoundment of the lake the stream confluence with the Osage River was at approximately 38°13′16″N 92°44′10″W and an elevation of 490 feet (150 m) on the Morgan-Camden county line approximately eight miles southeast of Gravois Mills.

The stream was named for the large quantity of gravel in its streambed from the French "gravois" rubbish or gravel.
