= Jesse Ratcliff House =

Historic house in Missouri, United States

- U.S. National Register of Historic Places
- Location within Missouri Location within the United States
- Location: Northeast of Barnett, near Barnett, Missouri
- Coordinates: 38°24′9″N 92°38′17″W
- Area: 0.1 acres (0.040 ha)
- Built: 1861-1864
- Built by: Porter, Mr.
- NRHP reference No.: 82003154
- Added to NRHP: April 12, 1982

Jesse Ratcliff House is a historic home located near Barnett, Morgan County, Missouri, United States. It was built between 1861 and 1864, and is a two-story, cut limestone I-house. It has a medium side gable roof and interior end chimneys.

It was listed on the National Register of Historic Places in 1982.
