= Minnow Branch (Big Buffalo Creek tributary) =

Stream in the American state of Missouri

Coordinates: 38°17′52″N 93°05′38″W

Minnow Branch is a stream in Benton and Morgan Counties in the U.S. state of Missouri. It is a tributary of Big Buffalo Creek.

Minnow Branch was named for the fact the creek supplied minnows as bait.

== See also ==
- List of rivers of Missouri
