= Moreau River =

Moreau River may refer to:

- Moreau River (Missouri)
- Moreau River (South Dakota)
