= Zora, Missouri =

- Unincorporated community
- Location within Missouri Location within the United States
- Coordinates: 38°17′11″N 93°05′48″W
- Country: United States
- State: Missouri
- County: Benton
- Elevation: 666 ft (203 m)
- Time zone: UTC-6 (Central (CST))
  - Summer (DST): UTC-5 (CDT)
- Area code: 660
- GNIS feature ID: 729834

Zora or Old Zora is an unincorporated community in eastern Benton County, Missouri, United States. Zora is located on the Big Buffalo Creek arm of the Lake of the Ozarks, 15.8 miles (25.4 km) east-northeast of Warsaw.

A post office called Zora was established in 1887, and remained in operation until 1931. The etymology of the name Zora is uncertain.
