= Haw Creek Township =

Haw Creek Township may refer to the following townships in the United States:

- Haw Creek Township, Bartholomew County, Indiana
- Haw Creek Township, Knox County, Illinois
- Haw Creek Township, Morgan County, Missouri
