= Augustus Sander House =

Historic house in Missouri, United States

- U.S. National Register of Historic Places
- Location within Missouri Location within the United States
- Location: 408 W. Jefferson St., Cole Camp, Missouri
- Coordinates: 38°27′21″N 93°12′22″W
- Area: 15 acres (6.1 ha)
- Built: c. 1861; 165 years ago, c. 1893; 133 years ago
- Architectural style: Single pen
- MPS: Cole Camp, Missouri MPS
- NRHP reference No.: 04000581
- Added to NRHP: June 9, 2004; 22 years ago

Augustus Sander House, also known as the Jacob and Annie Koch House and Frederich and Anna Brandt House, is a historic home located at Cole Camp, Benton County, Missouri. It was built about 1861, and is a 1 1/2-story, single-pen frame dwelling with a side gable roof. It has a wide rear ell added about 1875 and expanded about 1919, and a one-story front porch added about 1893.

It was listed on the National Register of Historic Places in 2004.
