= Piermont =

Piermont is the name of two places in the United States of America:

- Piermont, New Hampshire
- Piermont, New York

== See also ==
- Pyrmont (disambiguation)
- Piedmont
- Piedmont (United States)
