= Proctor, Missouri =

Unincorporated community in Missouri, U.S.

Coordinates: 38°15′18″N 92°56′09″W

Proctor is an unincorporated community in southwest Morgan County, in the U.S. state of Missouri.

The community is located adjacent to the Proctor Creek arm of the Lake of the Ozarks. Missouri Route J connects the community with Missouri Route 135 approximately two miles to the northeast.

== History ==
A post office called Proctor was established in 1871, and remained in operation until 1933. The community takes its name from nearby Proctor Creek.
