= Riverview, Morgan County, Missouri =

Unincorporated community in Missouri, U.S.

Coordinates: 38°16′33″N 93°04′11″W

Riverview is an unincorporated community in southwestern Morgan County, in the U.S. state of Missouri.

The community sits above the Lake of the Ozarks at the confluence of Big Buffalo Creek with the Osage River.

== History ==
A post office called Riverview was established in 1877, and remained in operation until 1906. The community was named on account of scenic views over the nearby Osage River.
