= Boylers Mill, Missouri =

Unincorporated community in Missouri, U.S.

Coordinates: 38°20′50″N 93°04′15″W

Boylers Mill is an unincorporated community in western Morgan County, in the U.S. state of Missouri. The community is in Pole Hollow just north of the Big Buffalo Creek. The site is on Missouri Route FF.

== History ==
A post office called Boyler's Mill was established in 1874, and remained in operation until 1922. A watermill called Boylers Mill and spring of the same name were also in the area.
