= Archer Creek (Missouri) =

Stream in Missouri, U.S.

Coordinates: 38°20′0.2″N 93°7′4″W

Archer Creek is a stream in Benton County, Missouri. It is a tributary of Big Buffalo Creek.

Archer Creek most likely was named after the local Archer family.

== See also ==
- List of rivers of Missouri
