= Buck Creek (Morgan County, Missouri) =

Stream in the U.S. state of Missouri

Coordinates: 38°12′43″N 92°47′39″W

Buck Creek is a stream in Morgan County in the U.S. state of Missouri. It is a tributary to the Osage River within the Lake of the Ozarks.

The stream headwaters arise at within the community of Laurie and adjacent to Missouri Route 5. The stream meanders east and enters the waters of the Lake of the Ozarks in Buck Creek Cove at . Prior to the impoundment of the lake, the Buck Creek confluence with the Osage River was approximately two miles to the east.

Buck Creek was so named due to the sightings of bucks by early settlers in the area.

== See also ==
- List of rivers of Missouri
