= Mill Creek Township, Morgan County, Missouri =

Township in Morgan County, Missouri, U.S.

Coordinates: 38.5958°N 92.8792°W

Mill Creek Township is a township in Morgan County, in the U.S. state of Missouri.

Mill Creek Township was erected in 1833.
