= Excelsior, Missouri =

- Unincorporated community
- Location within Missouri Location within the United States Location within the United States
- Coordinates: 38.4775257°N 92.7221361°W
- Country: United States
- State: Missouri
- County: Morgan
- Elevation: 896 ft (273 m)
- Time zone: UTC-6 (CST)
  - Summer (DST): UTC-5 (CDT)
- ZIP Code: 65084
- Area code: 573
- GNIS feature ID: 717702

Excelsior is an unincorporated community in Morgan County, Missouri.

== History ==
Excelsior was laid out in 1868. A post office called Excelsior was established in 1866 and remained in operation until 1922.
