= Rocky Mount, Morgan County, Missouri =

Unincorporated community in Missouri, U.S.

Rocky Mount, Missouri
- Unincorporated
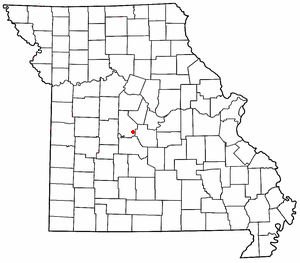
- Interactive map of Rocky Mount, Missouri
- Coordinates: 38°16′16″N 92°43′12″W
- Country: United States
- State: Missouri
- County: Morgan
- Postal code: 65072
- Area code: 573

Rocky Mount is an unincorporated community in eastern Morgan County, Missouri, United States. It is located six miles southwest of Eldon on Route Y near the Lake of the Ozarks.

== History ==
A post office called Rocky Mount was established in 1919 and remained in operation until 1973. The community was most likely named on account of the local terrain.
