= Buck Creek (Pechman Creek tributary) =

Stream in Iowa, United States

Coordinates: 41°30′17″N 91°30′18″W

Buck Creek is a stream in the U.S. state of Iowa. It is a tributary to Pechman Creek.

Buck Creek was named in the 19th century after C. H. Buck, a local politician.
