= List of Missouri places named after non-U.S. places =

This is a list of Missouri places named after non-US places. In the case of this list, place means any named location that's smaller than a county or equivalent: cities, towns, villages, hamlets, neighborhoods, municipalities, boroughs, townships, civil parishes, localities, Census Designated Places, and some districts. Also included are country homes, castles, palaces, and similar institutions.

This page was created from the “List of U.S. places named after non-U.S. places,” to provide just the list of Missouri places.

There are many places in the United States that are named after places in another country. By far, the majority of the names are due to immigrants naming their new home after their former home. As such they reflect the pattern of immigration to the United States. Immigrants did not just settle in random locations, but rather congregated with others who spoke the same language and had the same religion. Three examples:

- An area in western Michigan centered on Holland in southern Ottawa County was settled by religious refugees from the Netherlands. After a split from the state church in the Netherlands, they were unhappy with the restrictions the Dutch government placed on their religious practices. There are several villages in that region named after villages in the old country.
- A number of Belgian names are found clustered in the Green Bay area of northeastern Wisconsin. This reflects the high concentration of Belgian immigrants in that area.
- Ellis County, Kansas was the destination of a group of Volga Germans who moved there in the 1870s. Their settlements were mostly given the names of the villages they left behind in Russia.

Less concentrated groupings of foreign place names are Norwegian names throughout Minnesota, Czech names in southeast Texas, and Dutch names in the Hudson Valley of New York. The Hudson Valley locations are so named because the area was a Dutch colony before it became an English colony.

But not all the immigrants concentrated so heavily. Germans, for example, are one of the largest immigrant groups and places named after German cities are widespread across the United States. However, there is still a general concentration of them in the Midwestern United States, especially in Missouri.

Other sources of foreign names transferred to the US are the Bible and ancient history. Biblically sourced names are widespread and are sometimes the result of naming a settlement after its church. Names from ancient history can also be found in a number of places, although a concentration of them can be found in upstate New York. Names from these two sources can be found in the Ancient World section below the list of countries.

Places where battles happened are also a source for foreign names. The Mexican–American War is the most common source, but other wars, such as the Napoleonic Wars and World War I, are also represented.

There is a small number of names whose origin does not fall into the above categories. For example, some were given the names by railroads or taken from books the people naming the town had been reading. A few very unusual sources are Madras, Oregon, which was named after a bolt of Madras cloth seen in the general store, and Poland, Maine, which was named after a medieval-era song that the first settler liked.

Note that not all towns whose names are the same as a foreign city or country are named after that city. For example, there is only one US place that is known to be named for the Boston in England. That is Boston, Massachusetts. The Bostons in Indiana, Missouri, New York, and Highland and Summit Counties in Ohio, as well as Boston Corner, New York and South Boston, Virginia are named after Boston, Massachusetts; those in Georgia and Texas are named after people; while most other places with the name do not have a known etymology. Also note that places named after people are not on this list, even if that person's name can be traced back to a city. For this reason, cities such as New York, Baltimore, New Orleans, and Albuquerque are not on the list. Places named for people can be found at List of places named after people in the United States.

Some places have an indeterminate etymology, where it is known that they are named after a city in a particular country, but there is more than one place with that name and the etymology does not distinguish which one. These entries have "needs disambiguation" in their notes section.

== Afghanistan ==
City or town	Namesake
Kabul	Cabool, Missouri

== Algeria ==
City or town	Namesake
Oran	Oran, Missouri

== Argentina ==
City or town	Namesake
La Plata	La Plata, Missouri

== Austria ==
City or town	Namesake	Notes
Freistadt	Freistatt, Missouri	
Vienna	Vienna, Missouri	
Wels	New Wells, Missouri	

== Belgium ==
City or town	Namesake	Notes
Liège	Liege, Missouri	Liege, Missouri was annexed by Bellflower, Missouri in 1960

== Bolivia ==
City or town	Namesake	Notes
Potosí	Potosi, Missouri	

== Canada ==
City or town	Namesake	Notes
Halifax, Nova Scotia	Halifax, Missouri	
Montreal, Quebec	Montreal, Missouri	

== Cuba ==
City or town	Namesake	Notes
Cuba	Cuba, Missouri	

== Czech Republic ==
City or town	Namesake	Notes
Karlín	Karlin, Missouri	

== France ==
City or town	Namesake	Notes
Avallon	Avalon, Missouri	
Chantilly	Chantilly, Missouri	
Metz	Metz, Missouri	named for the Siege of Metz (1870)
Paris	Paris, Missouri	
Versailles	Versailles, Missouri	Pronounced “Ver-sales”
Vichy	Vichy, Missouri	

== Germany ==
City or town	Namesake	Notes
Arnsberg, North Rhine-Westphalia	Arnsberg, Missouri	
Cottbus, Brandenburg	Cottbus, Missouri	
Dissen, Lower Saxony	Dissen, Missouri	
Dutzow, Mecklenburg-Vorpommern	Dutzow, Missouri	
Melle, Lower Saxony	New Melle, Missouri	
Niederfrohna, Saxony	Frohna, Missouri	
Offenburg, Baden-Württemberg	New Offenburg, Missouri	
Paitzdorf, Thuringia	Uniontown, Missouri	original name of Uniontown was Paitzdorf
Seelitz, Saxony	Seelitz, Missouri	
Weingarten, Württemberg	Weingarten, Missouri	
Wittenberg, Saxony-Anhalt	Wittenberg, Missouri	
Zell am Harmersbach, Baden-Württemberg	Zell, Missouri	

== Italy ==
For more cities in Italy, see the Ancient world section below.

City or town	Namesake	Notes
Arcole	Arcola, Missouri	named for the Battle of Arcole
Como	Como, Missouri	
Milan	Milan, Missouri	Pronounced "Mylan"
Modena	Modena, Missouri	
Venice	Venice, Missouri	

== Lebanon ==
For more cities in Lebanon, see the Ancient world section below.

City or town	Namesake	Notes
Lebanon	Lebanon, Missouri	

Lebanon, Missouri is named after the country itself.

== Mexico ==
City or town	Namesake	Notes
Mexico	Mexico, Missouri	

== The Netherlands ==
City or town	Namesake	Notes
Amsterdam	Amsterdam, Missouri	

== Peru ==
City or town	Namesake	Notes
Callao	Callao, Missouri	

== Poland ==
City or town	Namesake	Notes
Miasteczko Krajeńskie (German: Friedheim)	Friedheim, Missouri	
Kraków	Krakow, Missouri	
Warsaw	Warsaw, Missouri	

== Portugal ==
City or town	Namesake	Notes
Lisbon	Lisbon, Missouri	

== Russia Ukraine ==
City or town	Namesake	Notes
Moscow	Moscow Mills, Missouri	
Sovetsk	Tilsit, Missouri	

|- | Odessa, Ukraine || Odessa, Missouri ||

== South Africa ==
City or town	Namesake	Notes
Kimberley, Northern Cape	Kimberly, Missouri	

== Spain ==
City or town	Namesake	Notes
Iberia	Iberia, Missouri	
Madrid	New Madrid, Missouri	

== United Kingdom ==
=== British Overseas Territories ===
City or town	Namesake	Notes
Longwood, Saint Helena	Longwood, Missouri	Place where Napoleon lived during his second exile.

=== England ===
City or town	Namesake	Notes
Birmingham, West Midlands	Birmingham, Missouri	
Broseley, Shropshire	Broseley, Missouri	
Brunswick (Hove), East Sussex	Brunswick, Missouri	
London	New London, Missouri	
Manchester	Manchester, Missouri	

=== Scotland ===
City or town	Namesake	Notes
Caledonia, the Roman Empire's name for Scotland	Caledonia, Missouri	
Edinburgh	Edina, Missouri	
Glasgow	Glasgow, Missouri	
Glen Coe	Glencoe, Missouri	
Kilwinning	Kilwinning, Missouri	

== Ancient world ==
Cities that have namesakes because they are biblical or prominent in ancient history are in this section.

City or town	Civilization	Modern location	Namesake	Notes
Arbela	Assyrian	Erbil, Iraq	Arbela, Missouri	named for the Battle of Arbela, where Alexander decisively defeated the Persian Empire
Bethany	Hebrew	al-Eizariya, West Bank	Bethany, Missouri	
Carthage	Punic, Berber	Carthage, Tunisia	Carthage, Missouri	
Herculaneum	Samnite	Ercolano, Campania, Italy	Herculaneum, Missouri	
Memphis	Egyptian	ruins near Mit Rahina, Egypt	Memphis, Missouri	
Troy	(unknown)	Hisarlik, Turkey	Troy, Missouri	

== See also ==
- List of places named after people in the United States
- List of places named after places in the United States
- Lists of places by language of origin
  - List of place names of Czech origin in the United States
  - List of place names of Dutch origin in the United States
  - Locations in the United States with an English name
  - List of place names of French origin in the United States
  - List of Irish place names in other countries
  - List of place names of Scottish origin in the United States
  - List of place names of Spanish origin in the United States
  - List of Swedish place names in the United States
  - List of place names of Welsh origin in the United States
