= Buffalo Township, Morgan County, Missouri =

Township in the U.S. state of Missouri

Coordinates: 38.2844°N 92.9511°W

Buffalo Township is a township in Morgan County, in the U.S. state of Missouri.

Buffalo Township takes its name from Big Buffalo Creek.
