= Morgan County Courthouse (Missouri) =

- U.S. National Register of Historic Places
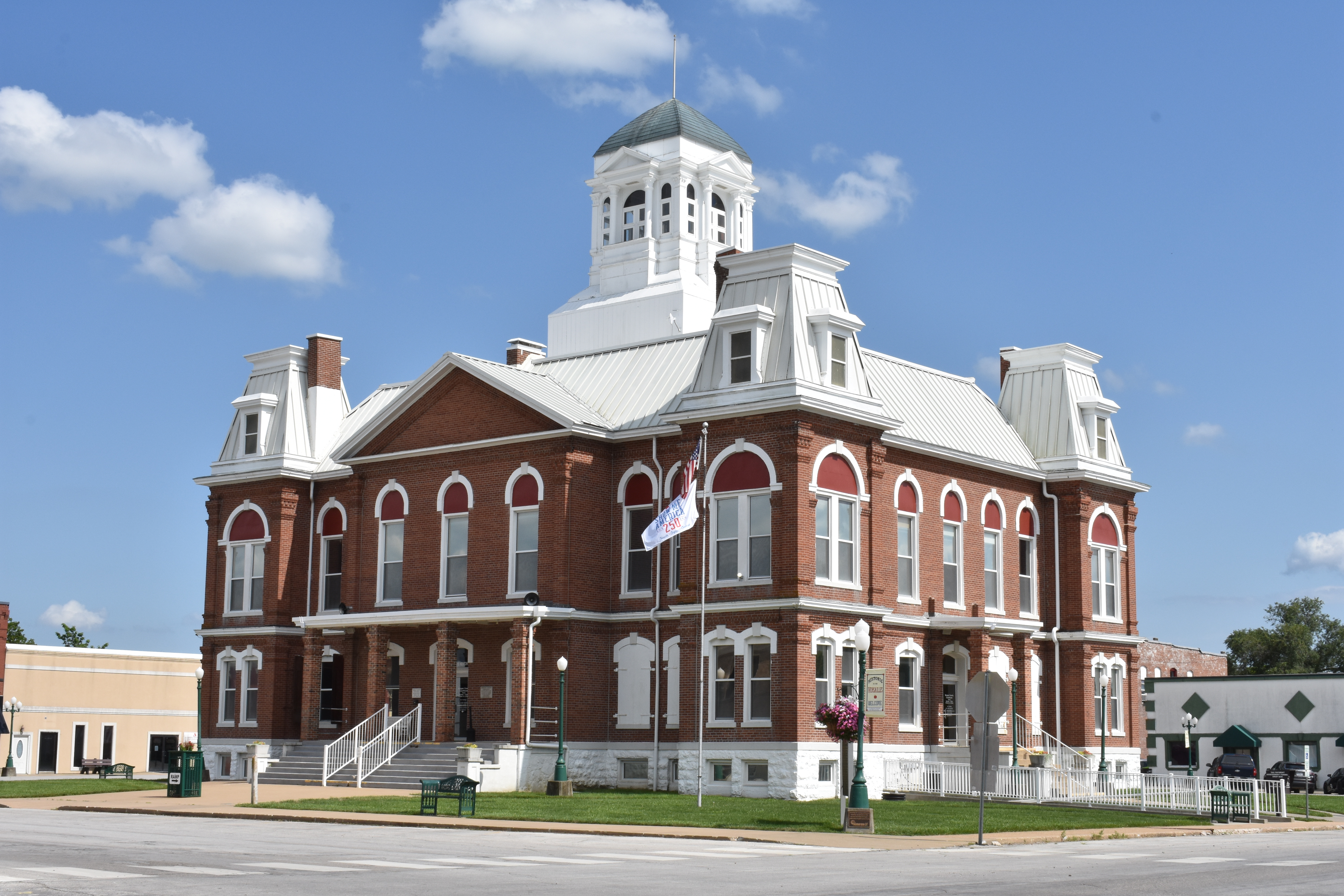
- Morgan County Courthouse, June 2026

- Location within Missouri Location within the United States
- Interactive map showing the location of Morgan County Courthouse
- Location: Courthouse Sq., Versailles, Missouri
- Coordinates: 38°25′53″N 92°51′11″W
- Area: less than one acre
- Built: 1889
- Architect: Schrange, William; Griffith, Hiram
- Architectural style: Second Empire
- NRHP reference No.: 80002383
- Added to NRHP: January 10, 1980

Morgan County Courthouse is a historic courthouse located in Versailles, Morgan County, Missouri. It was built in 1889 and is a two-story, Second Empire style red brick building on a limestone block foundation. It measures 85 feet by 85 feet. It features an aediculated cupola with decorative details articulated in cast iron, molded tin and wood, with four mansarded corner pavilions of three stories each. It is designed in a French style.

It was listed on the National Register of Historic Places in 1980.
