= Syracuse, Missouri =

- City
- Location in Morgan County and the state of Missouri
- Coordinates: 38°40′10″N 92°52′30″W
- Country: United States
- State: Missouri
- County: Morgan
- Incorporateda: 1894

Area
  - Total: 0.37 sq mi (0.97 km^{2})
  - Land: 0.37 sq mi (0.97 km^{2})
  - Water: 0 sq mi (0.00 km^{2})
- Elevation: 909 ft (277 m)

Population (2020)
  - Total: 151
  - Density: 402.6/sq mi (155.46/km^{2})
- Time zone: UTC-6 (Central (CST))
  - Summer (DST): UTC-5 (CDT)
- ZIP code: 65354
- Area code: 660
- FIPS code: 29-72106
- GNIS feature ID: 2396022

Syracuse is a city in Morgan County, Missouri, United States. The population was 151 at the 2020 census. In the middle of the 19th century, the city was the western terminus of the Pacific Railway that reached 108 miles from St. Louis. The current mayor of Syracuse is Duane A. Doyle.

== History ==
In 1859 with the railroad construction to Syracuse, it became the Terminus of The Butterfield Overland Mail Route. The route was designated a national historic trail in 2023. Syracuse was originally called "Pacific City", and under the latter name was laid out in 1858. The present name is after Syracuse, New York.

== Geography ==
Syracuse is in northern Morgan County, along U.S. Route 50, which leads east 5 miles (8 km) to Tipton and west 19 miles (31 km) to Sedalia. Versailles, the Morgan county seat, is 19 miles (31 km) to the south via secondary highways.

According to the U.S. Census Bureau, Syracuse has a total area of 0.38 square miles (0.98 km^{2}), all land. The city sits on a ridge which drains southeast toward Messer Creek and northwest toward Otter Creek, both part of the Lamine River watershed leading north to the Missouri.

== Demographics ==
Historical population
Census	Pop.	Note	%±
1880	202		—
1890	187		−7.4%
1900	175		−6.4%
1910	193		10.3%
1920	288		49.2%
1930	288		0.0%
1940	262		−9.0%
1950	221		−15.6%
1960	180		−18.6%
1970	214		18.9%
1980	222		3.7%
1990	185		−16.7%
2000	172		−7.0%
2010	172		0.0%
2020	151		−12.2%
U.S. Decennial Census

=== 2010 census ===
As of the census of 2010, there were 172 people, 68 households, and 45 families living in the city. The population density was 452.6 inhabitants per square mile (174.7/km^{2}). There were 79 housing units at an average density of 207.9 per square mile (80.3/km^{2}). The racial makeup of the city was 98.8% White and 1.2% from two or more races. Hispanic or Latino of any race were 3.5% of the population.

There were 68 households, of which 29.4% had children under the age of 18 living with them, 45.6% were married couples living together, 8.8% had a female householder with no husband present, 11.8% had a male householder with no wife present, and 33.8% were non-families. 22.1% of all households were made up of individuals, and 14.7% had someone living alone who was 65 years of age or older. The average household size was 2.53 and the average family size was 3.04.

The median age in the city was 37.7 years. 25% of residents were under the age of 18; 11.6% were between the ages of 18 and 24; 24.3% were from 25 to 44; 23.3% were from 45 to 64; and 15.7% were 65 years of age or older. The gender makeup of the city was 48.3% male and 51.7% female.

=== 2000 census ===
As of the census of 2000, there were 172 people, 70 households, and 51 families living in the city. The population density was 451.9 inhabitants per square mile (174.5/km^{2}). There were 82 housing units at an average density of 215.4 per square mile (83.2/km^{2}). The racial makeup of the city was 97.67% White, 0.58% Asian, and 1.74% from two or more races. Hispanic or Latino of any race were 2.33% of the population.

There were 70 households, out of which 31.4% had children under the age of 18 living with them, 62.9% were married couples living together, 7.1% had a female householder with no husband present, and 27.1% were non-families. 20.0% of all households were made up of individuals, and 2.9% had someone living alone who was 65 years of age or older. The average household size was 2.46 and the average family size was 2.78.

In the city, the population was spread out, with 22.7% under the age of 18, 9.3% from 18 to 24, 30.2% from 25 to 44, 32.6% from 45 to 64, and 5.2% who were 65 years of age or older. The median age was 37 years. For every 100 females, there were 107.2 males. For every 100 females age 18 and over, there were 107.8 males.

The median income for a household in the city was $34,773, and the median income for a family was $38,214. Males had a median income of $24,750 versus $21,389 for females. The per capita income for the city was $18,463. None of the families and 4.5% of the population were living below the poverty line, including no under eighteens and 18.2% of those over 64.

== KMOS-TV ==
Syracuse is home to the KMOS TV Tower, built in 2003 and operated by the University of Central Missouri. At a height of 2,000 feet (610 m), it is the tallest structure in Missouri.
