= Glensted, Missouri =

Unincorporated community in Missouri, U.S.

Coordinates: 38°30′56″N 92°51′20″W

Glensted is an unincorporated community in Morgan County, in the U.S. state of Missouri.

== History ==
A post office called Glensted was established in 1883, and remained in operation until 1955. The community's name is said to be a transfer from a place in Germany.
