= Sawmill Hollow =

Valley in Missouri, United States

Coordinates: 38.287527°N 92.993807°W

Sawmill Hollow is a valley in Morgan County in the U.S. state of Missouri.

Sawmill Hollow was named for the presence of a sawmill which operated until forests were cleared.
