= Brewner Hollow =

Valley in Missouri, United States

Coordinates: 38.2966934°N 92.9896408°W

Brewner Hollow (also called Bruner Hollow) is a valley in Morgan County, Missouri.

Brewner Hollow derives its name from the local Bruner family, who were the original owners of the site.
