= Central Cole Camp Historic District =

Historic district in Missouri, United States

- U.S. National Register of Historic Places
- U.S. Historic district
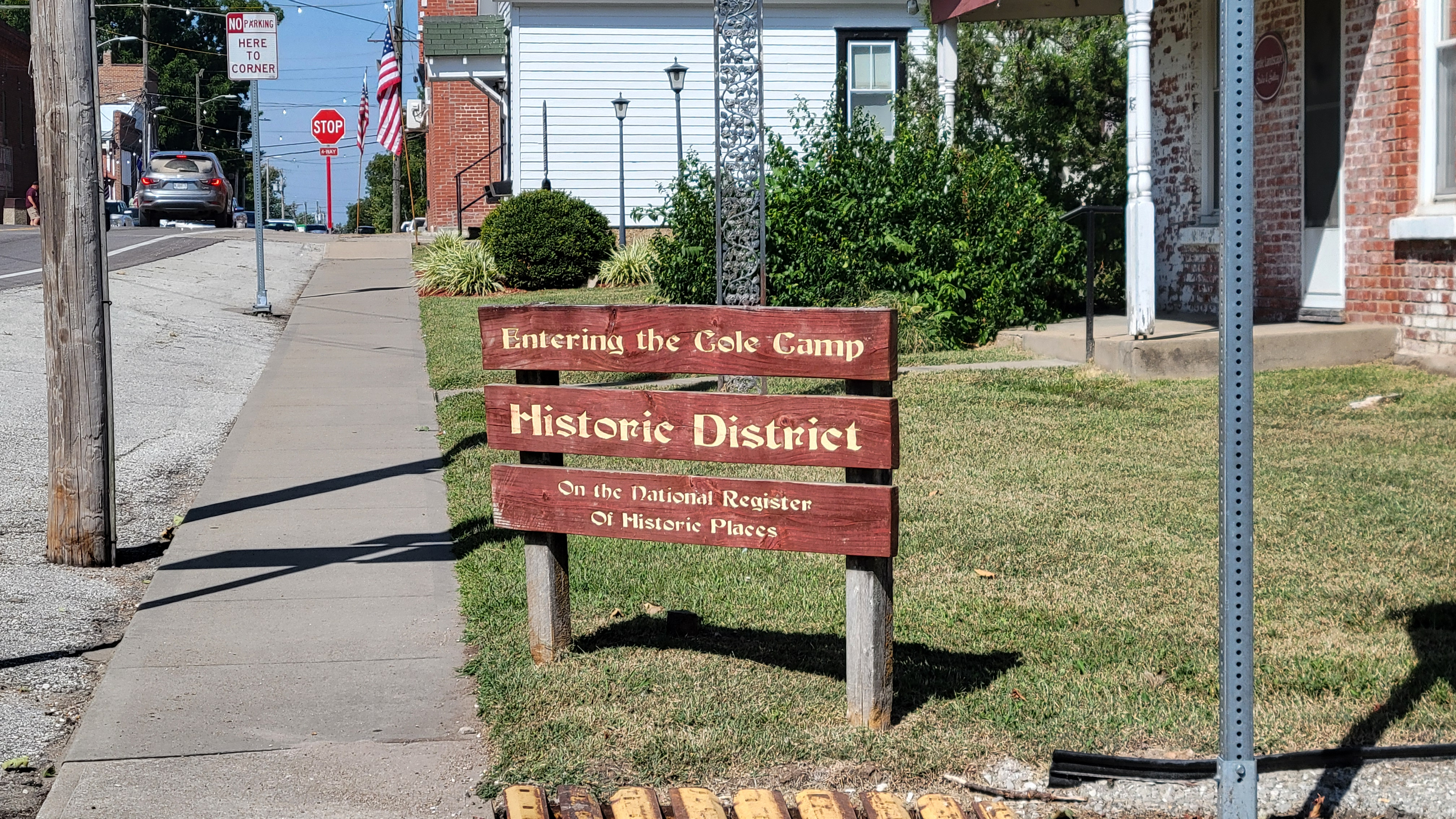
- Cole Camp Historic District Sign

- Location within Missouri Location within the United States
- Location: Roughly consists of the 100 blocks of E and W Main St., most of Maple St.,105 E. Butterfield,106 N Olive, 107 N Boonville, Cole Camp, Missouri
- Coordinates: 38°27′35″N 93°14′14″W
- Area: 7.8 acres (3.2 ha)
- Architect: Anderson; Keiffer and Laughlin
- Architectural style: multiple
- MPS: Cole Camp, Missouri MPS
- NRHP reference No.: 02000355
- Added to NRHP: April 11, 2002

Central Cole Camp Historic District is a national historic district located at Cole Camp, Benton County, Missouri. The district encompasses 37 contributing buildings in the central business district of Cole Camp. It developed between about 1881 and 1951, and includes representative examples of period commercial, Romanesque Revival, and Italianate style architecture. Notable buildings include the Daisy Roller Mill (c. 1888), Citizens Bank (1898), Congregational Church (1913), Kroenke Dort Building (c. 1919), and Cole Camp Mercantile Building (c. 1924).

It was listed on the National Register of Historic Places in 2002.
