= Buck Creek (Cuivre River tributary) =

Stream in the U.S. state of Missouri

Buck Creek is a stream in Lincoln County in the U.S. state of Missouri. It is a tributary of the North Fork of the Cuivre River.

The stream headwaters arise one mile east of the community of Corso at 39°07′49″N 91°09′35″W at an elevation of approximately 675 feet. The stream flows north and east to its confluence approximately three miles northwest of the community of Silex at 39°08′48″N 91°06′54″W and an elevation of 509 feet.

Buck Creek may be named for the bucks (male deer) observed along its course.

== See also ==
- List of rivers of Missouri
