= Haw Creek (Salt River tributary) =

Stream in the American state of Missouri

Coordinates: 39.53053°N 91.2145°W

Haw Creek is a stream in Pike County in the U.S. state of Missouri. It is a tributary of the Salt River.

Haw Creek was so named on account of black haw timber in the area.

== See also ==
- List of rivers of Missouri
