= Laurie, Missouri =

City in Morgan and Camden counties in Missouri, United States

- City
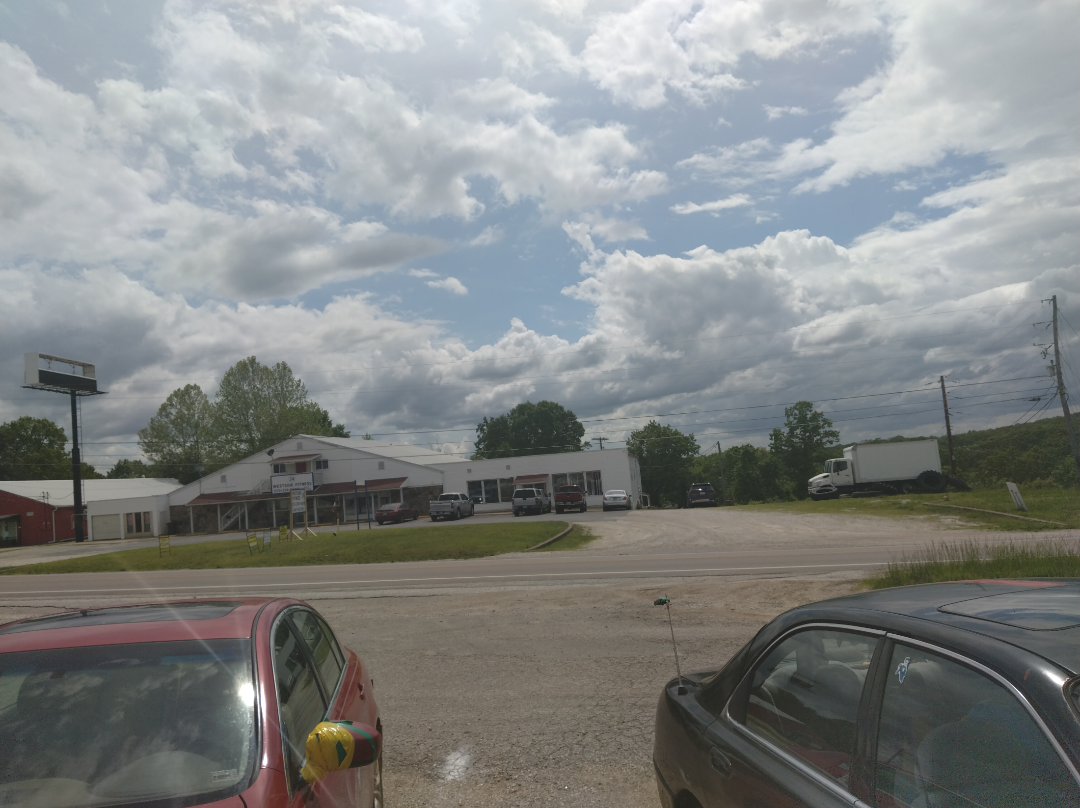
- Laurie in May 2024

- Location in Morgan County and the state of Missouri
- Coordinates: 38°12′29″N 92°49′31″W
- Country: United States
- State: Missouri
- Counties: Morgan; Camden

Area
  - Total: 5.50 sq mi (14.24 km^{2})
  - Land: 5.50 sq mi (14.24 km^{2})
  - Water: 0 sq mi (0.00 km^{2})
- Elevation: 883 ft (269 m)

Population (2020)
  - Total: 939
  - Density: 170.8/sq mi (65.94/km^{2})
- Time zone: UTC-6 (Central (CST))
  - Summer (DST): UTC-5 (CDT)
- ZIP codes: 65037-65038
- Area code: 573
- FIPS code: 29-40916
- GNIS feature ID: 2398400
- Website: lauriemo.gov

Laurie is a city in southern Morgan and northern Camden counties, Missouri, United States. The population was 939 at the 2020 census.

== Demographics ==
Historical population
Census	Pop.	Note	%±
1970	106		—
1980	154		45.3%
1990	507		229.2%
2000	663		30.8%
2010	945		42.5%
2020	939		−0.6%
U.S. Decennial Census

=== 2010 census ===
As of the census of 2010, there were 945 people, 457 households, and 241 families living in the city. The population density was 171.8 inhabitants per square mile (66.3/km^{2}). There were 549 housing units at an average density of 99.8 per square mile (38.5/km^{2}). The racial makeup of the city was 97.8% White, 0.2% African American, 0.3% Native American, 0.1% from other races, and 1.6% from two or more races. Hispanic or Latino of any race were 0.6% of the population.

There were 457 households, of which 17.5% had children under the age of 18 living with them, 40.3% were married couples living together, 9.8% had a female householder with no husband present, 2.6% had a male householder with no wife present, and 47.3% were non-families. 40.7% of all households were made up of individuals, and 23.9% had someone living alone who was 65 years of age or older. The average household size was 1.92 and the average family size was 2.52.

The median age in the city was 55.8 years. 14% of residents were under the age of 18; 5.8% were between the ages of 18 and 24; 16.4% were from 25 to 44; 24.6% were from 45 to 64; and 39.2% were 65 years of age or older. The gender makeup of the city was 47.1% male and 52.9% female.

=== 2000 census ===
As of the census of 2000, there were 663 people, 299 households, and 156 families living in the village. The population density was 126.0 inhabitants per square mile (48.6/km^{2}). There were 329 housing units at an average density of 62.5 per square mile (24.1/km^{2}). The racial makeup of the village was 97.29% White, 0.45% African American, 1.06% Native American, 0.15% from other races, and 1.06% from two or more races. Hispanic or Latino of any race were 0.75% of the population.

There were 299 households, out of which 17.7% had children under the age of 18 living with them, 44.5% were married couples living together, 5.7% had a female householder with no husband present, and 47.8% were non-families. 40.5% of all households were made up of individuals, and 23.1% had someone living alone who was 65 years of age or older. The average household size was 1.92 and the average family size was 2.59.

In the village, the population was spread out, with 14.9% under the age of 18, 4.8% from 18 to 24, 19.5% from 25 to 44, 19.9% from 45 to 64, and 40.9% who were 65 years of age or older. The median age was 55 years. For every 100 females, there were 80.7 males. For every 100 females age 18 and over, there were 76.8 males.

The median income for a household in the village was $24,333, and the median income for a family was $35,357. Males had a median income of $25,833 versus $19,063 for females. The per capita income for the village was $18,023. About 8.6% of families and 12.4% of the population were below the poverty line, including 17.3% of those under age 18 and 7.8% of those age 65 or over.

== Geography ==
Laurie is located along the southern border of Morgan County, and a small portion extends south into Camden County. It is about 2 miles (3 km) north of the Lake of the Ozarks. The city is on Missouri Route 5, which leads southeast 3 miles (5 km) to Sunrise Beach and north 8 miles (13 km) to Gravois Mills. Versailles, the Morgan county seat, is 18 miles (29 km) north of Laurie.

According to the U.S. Census Bureau, the city of Laurie has a total area of 5.50 square miles (14.24 km^{2}), all land. The city sits on a ridge which drains in all directions toward the Lake of the Ozarks.

=== Climate ===
The local climate is characterized by relatively high temperatures and evenly distributed precipitation throughout the year. The Köppen Climate Classification subtype for this climate is Cfa" (Humid Subtropical Climate).

Climate data for Laurie, Missouri
Month	Jan	Feb	Mar	Apr	May	Jun	Jul	Aug	Sep	Oct	Nov	Dec	Year
Mean daily maximum °C (°F)	5 (41)	8 (46)	14 (57)	20 (68)	24 (76)	29 (84)	32 (89)	31 (88)	27 (80)	21 (70)	13 (56)	7 (44)	19 (67)
Mean daily minimum °C (°F)	−7 (20)	−4 (24)	1 (33)	6 (43)	12 (53)	17 (62)	19 (67)	18 (65)	14 (57)	7 (45)	1 (34)	−4 (24)	7 (44)
Average precipitation mm (inches)	48 (1.9)	51 (2)	76 (3)	100 (4)	130 (5)	110 (4.5)	99 (3.9)	91 (3.6)	110 (4.2)	94 (3.7)	76 (3)	56 (2.2)	1,040 (40.9)
Source: Weatherbase

== Events ==
Every year from Mid-November to News Year Day, a drive-through village area of Christmas lights is shown known as "Enchanted Village of Lights."

== See also ==
- List of cities in Missouri
