= Richland Township, Morgan County, Missouri =

Township in Morgan County, Missouri, U.S.

Coordinates: 38.6092°N 92.9983°W

Richland Township is a township in Morgan County, in the U.S. state of Missouri.

Richland Township was named on account of their fertile soil.
