= Haw Creek Township, Morgan County, Missouri =

Township in Missouri

Coordinates: 38.4403°N 92.9564°W

Haw Creek Township is a township in Morgan County, in the U.S. state of Missouri.

Haw Creek Township takes its name from the creek of the same name within its borders.

As of 2023, there was a population of 4,775 and a total of 1,754 households.
