= Pechman Creek =

Stream in Iowa, U.S.

Coordinates: 41°30′10″N 91°30′28″W

Pechman Creek is a stream in the U.S. state of Iowa. It is a tributary to the Iowa River.

Pechman Creek was named after William Pechman, a pioneer settler.
