= Buck Creek (Rogue River tributary) =

Rogue River tributary in the US state of Oregon

- Location within Oregon Location within the United States

Physical characteristics
- Source
  - coordinates: 42.6638889°N 122.4036111°W
- Mouth
  - coordinates: 42.7004061°N 122.4622557°W

Buck Creek is a stream in the U.S. state of Oregon. It is a tributary to the Rogue River.

Buck Creek was named after Norman L. Buck, a pioneer citizen.
