= Buck Creek (Joachim Creek tributary) =

Stream in the American state of Missouri

Buck Creek is a stream in Jefferson County in the U.S. state of Missouri. It is a tributary of Joachim Creek.

The stream headwaters arise at 38°08′52″N 90°27′04″W just northwest of US Route 67 and it flows northeast roughly parallel to that route for about two miles. The stream turns north for about 1.5 miles to its confluence with Joachim Creek about two miles west of Festus at 38°12′47″N 90°26′33″W.

Buck Creek most likely was named for the bucks (male white-tailed deer) in the area.

== See also ==
- List of rivers of Missouri
