= Marvin, Missouri =

Unincorporated community in Missouri, U.S.

Coordinates: 38°24′59″N 92°46′15″W

Marvin is an unincorporated community in Morgan County, in the U.S. state of Missouri.

== History ==
A post office called Marvin was established in 1904, and remained in operation until 1938. The community has the name of H. L. Marvin, a railroad official.
