= Haw Creek (Morgan County, Missouri) =

Stream in Missouri, United States

Coordinates: 38.6252973°N 93.0271439°W

Haw Creek is a stream in Morgan County in the U.S. state of Missouri.

Haw Creek was so named on account of black haw timber near its course.

== See also ==
- List of rivers of Missouri
