= Florence, Missouri =

Uninincorporated community in Morgan County, Missouri, United States

- Unincorporated community
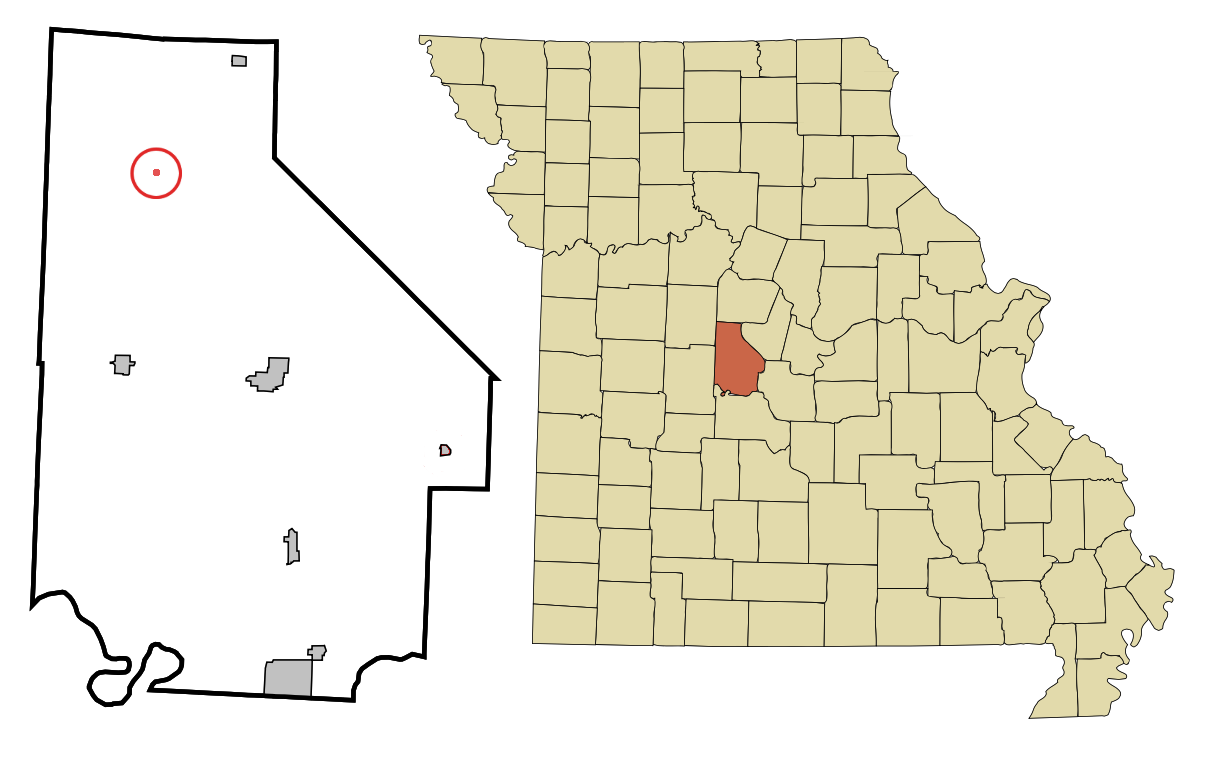
- Location of Florence, Missouri
- Coordinates: 38°35′20″N 92°58′45″W
- Country: United States
- State: Missouri
- County: Morgan
- Elevation: 945 ft (288 m)

Population (2010)
  - Total: 494
  - Estimate (2011): 530
- Time zone: UTC-6 (Central (CST))
  - Summer (DST): UTC-5 (CDT)
- ZIP code: 65329
- Area code: 660
- GNIS feature ID: 729740

Florence is an unincorporated community in Morgan County, Missouri, United States.

== Description ==
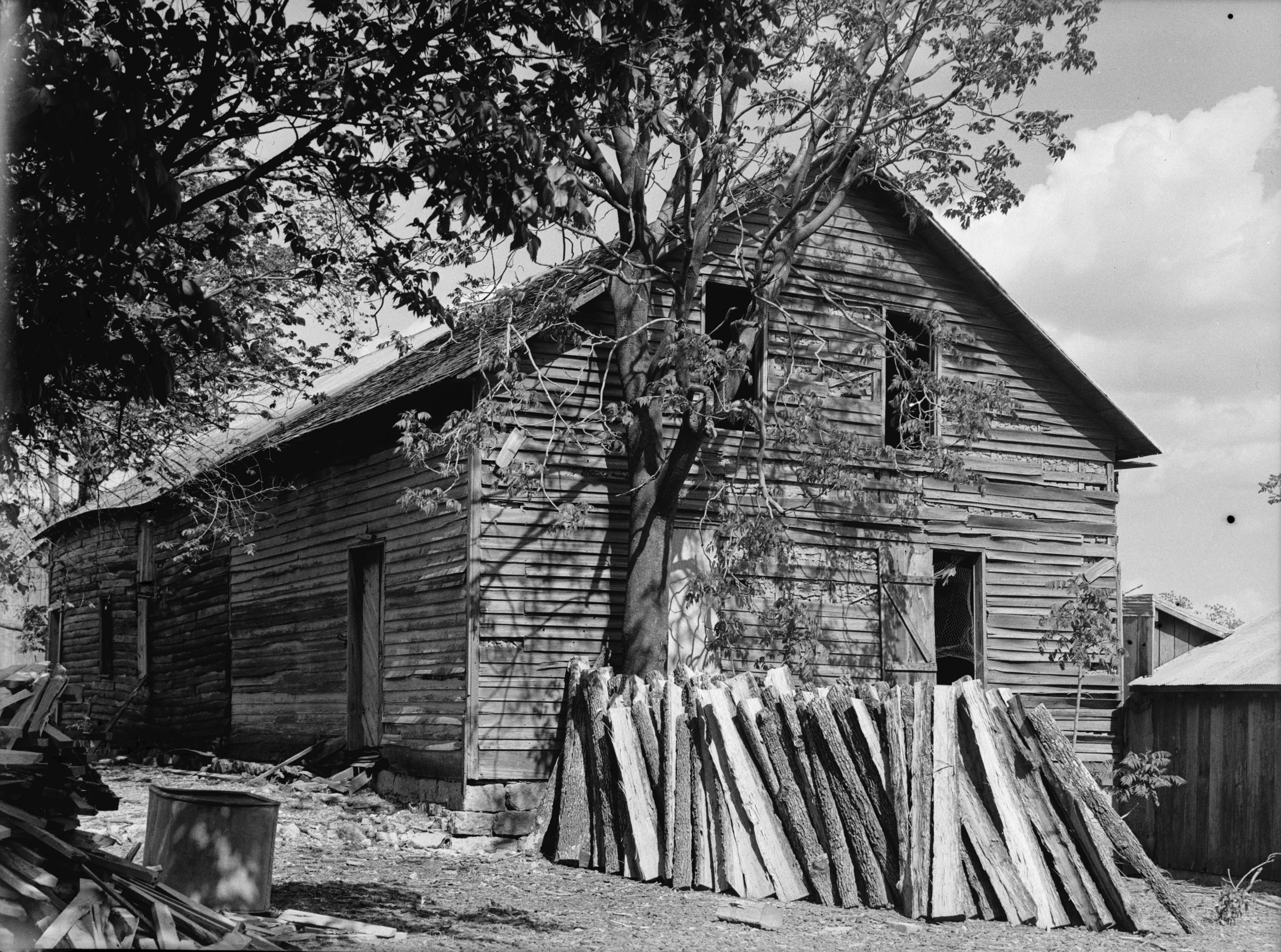
Hummel Pottery Building, 1939

The community is eight miles (13 km) south of U.S. Route 50 on Missouri Route 135.

A post office called Florence has been in operation since 1839. Early variant names were "Williamsville" and "Jonesboro".

== Notable residents ==
- Robert F. Walker Missouri Attorney General from 1893 to 1897 and Missouri Supreme Court justice
