= Cole Camp, Missouri =

City in Benton County, Missouri, United States

- City
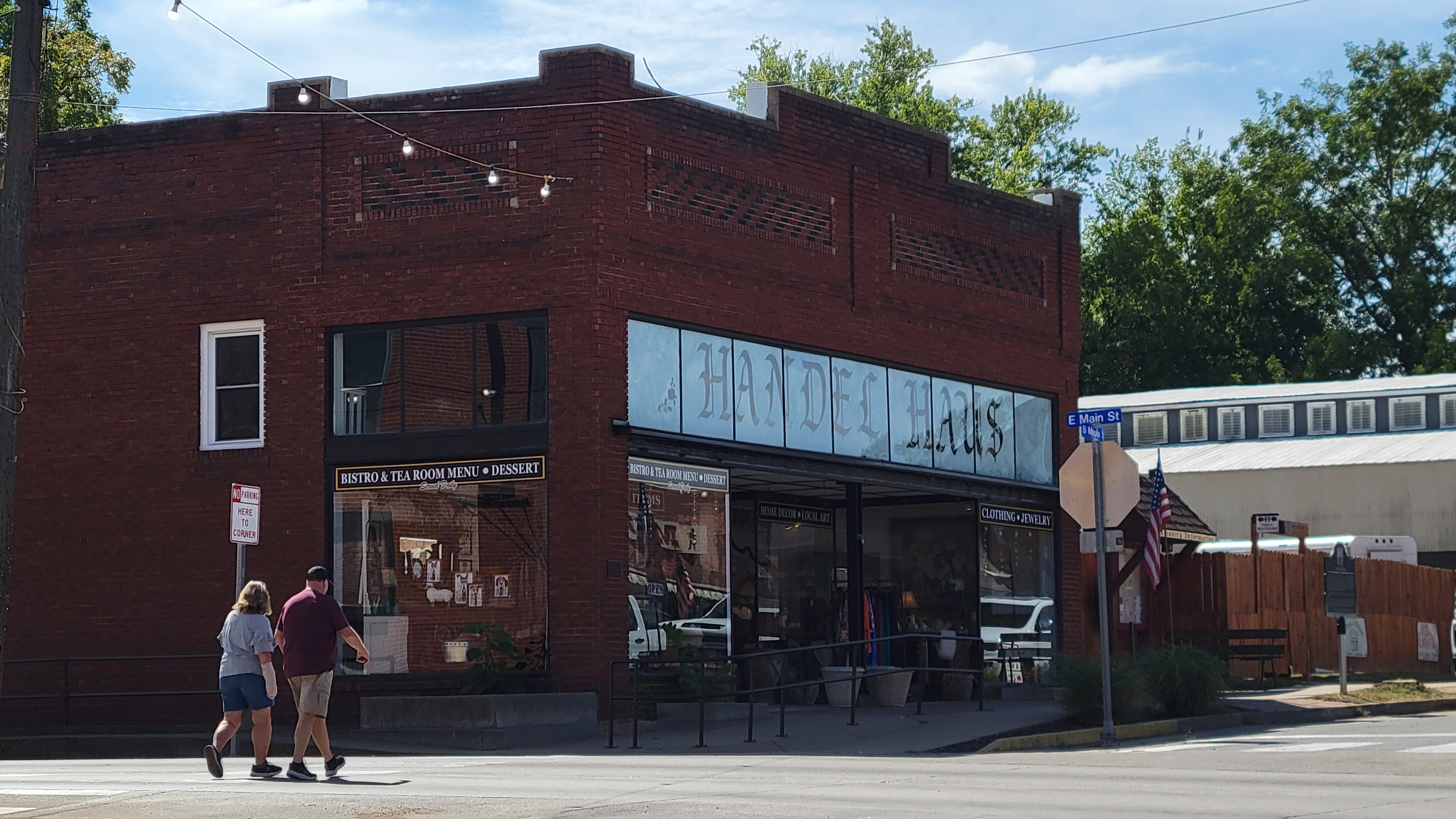
- Handel Haus Building

- Coat of arms

- Location of Cole Camp, Missouri
- Coordinates: 38°27′34″N 93°12′09″W
- Country: United States
- State: Missouri
- County: Benton

Government
  - Mayor: Diana Burdick

Area
  - Total: 1.30 sq mi (3.37 km^{2})
  - Land: 1.30 sq mi (3.37 km^{2})
  - Water: 0 sq mi (0.00 km^{2})
- Elevation: 1,053 ft (321 m)

Population (2020)
  - Total: 1,104
  - Density: 848.1/sq mi (327.47/km^{2})
- Time zone: UTC-6 (Central (CST))
  - Summer (DST): UTC-5 (CDT)
- ZIP code: 65325
- Area code: 660
- FIPS code: 29-15436
- GNIS feature ID: 2393592
- Website: www.cityofcolecamp.com

Cole Camp is a small city in Benton County, Missouri, United States. As of the 2020 census, Cole Camp had a population of 1,104.

The town is known for the annual street fair in September. It also hosts a Maifest in May, an Oktoberfest in October, and a Christbaumfest in late November; all highlight the town's German heritage.

== History ==
Cole Camp was laid out in 1857. It became a Flag Stop on the Butterfield Overland Mail route that next year. Tipton was an eastern terminus of the when it was launched in 1858. The route was connected to St. Louis by the Pacific Railroad. The Butterfield Overland Mail Route ran in the 1858-1861 Period before the American Civil War. The first postmaster of Cole Camp was Ezekiel Williams, Sr., appointed February 26, 1839. The city most likely was named after pioneer Captain Stephen Cole. Cole Camp was the site of a skirmish early in the American Civil War, when the local pro-Union Home Guard company was attacked by a Missouri State Guard force on June 19, 1861. At the Battle of Cole Camp, the Home Guard were defeated with a loss of 35 men killed or wounded.

The Central Cole Camp Historic District and Augustus Sander House are listed on the National Register of Historic Places.

== Geography ==
Cole Camp is located in northeast Benton County along Missouri Route 52 approximately four miles west of US Route 65. The headwaters of Cole Camp Creek are adjacent to the west side of the community.

According to the United States Census Bureau, the city has a total area of 1.30 square miles (3.37 km^{2}), all land.

== Demographics ==
Historical population
Census	Pop.	Note	%±
1900	648		—
1910	910		40.4%
1920	889		−2.3%
1930	932		4.8%
1940	753		−19.2%
1950	813		8.0%
1960	853		4.9%
1970	1,038		21.7%
1980	1,022		−1.5%
1990	1,054		3.1%
2000	1,028		−2.5%
2010	1,121		9.0%
2020	1,104		−1.5%
U.S. Decennial Census

=== 2010 census ===
As of the census of 2010, there were 1,121 people, 492 households, and 286 families residing in the city. The population density was 862.3 inhabitants per square mile (332.9/km^{2}). There were 560 housing units at an average density of 430.8 per square mile (166.3/km^{2}). The racial makeup of the city was 98.2% White, 0.1% Native American, 0.3% Asian, 0.3% from other races, and 1.2% from two or more races. Hispanic or Latino of any race were 0.9% of the population.

There were 492 households, of which 27.0% had children under the age of 18 living with them, 45.1% were married couples living together, 10.0% had a female householder with no husband present, 3.0% had a male householder with no wife present, and 41.9% were non-families. 38.0% of all households were made up of individuals, and 26.2% had someone living alone who was 65 years of age or older. The average household size was 2.16 and the average family size was 2.85.

The median age in the city was 47.3 years. 21.6% of residents were under the age of 18; 7.1% were between the ages of 18 and 24; 18.2% were from 25 to 44; 23.5% were from 45 to 64; and 29.5% were 65 years of age or older. The gender makeup of the city was 44.7% male and 55.3% female.

=== 2000 census ===
As of the census of 2000, there were 1,028 people, 451 households, and 261 families residing in the city. The population density was 1,050.6 inhabitants per square mile (405.6/km^{2}). There were 493 housing units at an average density of 503.8 per square mile (194.5/km^{2}). The racial makeup of the city was 98.93% White, 0.10% African American, 0.10% Native American, 0.19% Asian, and 0.68% from two or more races. Hispanic or Latino of any race were 0.49% of the population.

There were 451 households, out of which 25.9% had children under the age of 18 living with them, 49.2% were married couples living together, 5.8% had a female householder with no husband present, and 42.1% were non-families. 40.8% of all households were made up of individuals, and 27.5% had someone living alone who was 65 years of age or older. The average household size was 2.16 and the average family size was 2.96.

In the city the population was spread out, with 21.9% under the age of 18, 7.9% from 18 to 24, 24.3% from 25 to 44, 17.5% from 45 to 64, and 28.4% who were 65 years of age or older. The median age was 42 years. For every 100 females, there were 80.0 males. For every 100 females age 18 and over, there were 77.7 males.

The median income for a household in the city was $26,190, and the median income for a family was $37,250. Males had a median income of $26,827 versus $22,500 for females. The per capita income for the city was $17,280. About 2.1% of families and 6.2% of the population were below the poverty line, including 0.5% of those under age 18 and 14.1% of those age 65 or over.

== Education ==
Cole Camp R-1 School District operates one public elementary school, one middle school, and Cole Camp High School. Cole Camp Methodist Pre-School and Trinity Lutheran Pre-School are private institutions. Lutheran School Association is a K-8 school in the community and the majority of those students attend Cole Camp High School. As of 2022 Cole Camp High School is ranked by U.S. News and World Report as the #195 best high school in Missouri, with an enrollment of 222 students.

Cole Camp has a public library, a branch of the Boonslick Regional Library.

== Notable people ==
- Martin Heinrich, raised in Cole Camp. Former congressman and U.S. Senator from New Mexico
- Stan Kroenke- owner of Los Angeles Rams, Denver Nuggets, Colorado Avalanche, and majority owner of Arsenal
- Carol Loomis- Journalist and retired senior editor-at-large at Fortune (magazine)

== See also ==
- List of cities in Missouri
- Cole Camp Creek
