= South Moreau Creek =

Waterway in Missouri, United States

South Moreau Creek is a stream in Miller and Cole Counties of Missouri, United States. It is a tributary of the Moreau River, part of the Mississippi Basin.

The headwaters are at northwest of Miller County at 38°19′46″N 92°39′48″W. The stream flows to the northeastern direction, crossing into the southern portion of Moniteau County. South Moreau Creek has an average elevation of 738 feet (225 m) above the sea level. It and the North Moreau Creek form a confluence at 38°29′58″N 92°18′27″W, where both creeks enter the Moreau River.

== See also ==
- List of rivers of Missouri
