= Stover, Missouri =

- City
- Location within Missouri Location within the United States
- Coordinates: 38°26′32″N 92°59′25″W
- Country: United States
- State: Missouri
- County: Morgan

Government
  - Mayor: Colton Knierim

Area
  - Total: 0.89 sq mi (2.30 km^{2})
  - Land: 0.89 sq mi (2.30 km^{2})
  - Water: 0 sq mi (0.00 km^{2})
- Elevation: 1,086 ft (331 m)

Population (2020)
  - Total: 1,006
  - Density: 1,133.9/sq mi (437.82/km^{2})
- Time zone: UTC-6 (Central (CST))
  - Summer (DST): UTC-5 (CST)
- ZIP code: 65078
- Area code: 573
- FIPS code: 29-71044
- GNIS feature ID: 2395980
- Website: cityofstover.net

Stover is a city in Morgan County, Missouri, United States. The population was 1,006 at the 2020 census, down from 1,094 in 2010.

== History ==
A post office called Stover has been in operation since 1875. The community has the name of John Hubler Stover, a congressman from Missouri. Stover was laid out at its current site in 1905 when the railroad was extended to that point. Prior to 1905, the city was slightly to the southeast of its current location. When the St. Louis-Kansas City Colorado Railroad, later known as the Rock Island Line, decided to bypass the original village of Stover, residents began setting up businesses along the route. It was in 1905 that the last business made its way to the new location.

== Geography ==
Stover is located in western Morgan County at the intersection of Missouri routes 52 and 135. Versailles, the county seat, is 8 miles (13 km) to the east, and Cole Camp is 12 miles (19 km) to the west in adjacent Benton County.

According to the U.S. Census Bureau, Stover has a total area of 0.89 square miles (2.31 km^{2}), all land. Land in the city drains west to Gabriel Creek and east to Middle Richland Creek, both north-flowing tributaries of Richland Creek, part of the Lamine River watershed flowing north to the Missouri River.

== Demographics ==
Historical population
Census	Pop.	Note	%±
1910	386		—
1920	447		15.8%
1930	517		15.7%
1940	584		13.0%
1950	693		18.7%
1960	757		9.2%
1970	849		12.2%
1980	1,041		22.6%
1990	964		−7.4%
2000	968		0.4%
2010	1,094		13.0%
2020	1,006		−8.0%
U.S. Decennial Census

=== 2010 census ===
As of the census of 2010, there were 1,094 people, 453 households, and 270 families living in the city. The population density was 1,229.2 inhabitants per square mile (474.6/km^{2}). There were 532 housing units at an average density of 597.8 per square mile (230.8/km^{2}). The racial makeup of the city was 96.5% White, 0.5% Native American, 0.1% Asian, 0.2% Pacific Islander, 1.5% from other races, and 1.2% from two or more races. Hispanic or Latino of any race were 2.2% of the population.

There were 453 households, of which 27.2% had children under the age of 18 living with them, 42.4% were married couples living together, 11.0% had a female householder with no husband present, 6.2% had a male householder with no wife present, and 40.4% were non-families. 33.6% of all households were made up of individuals, and 17.7% had someone living alone who was 65 years of age or older. The average household size was 2.32 and the average family size was 2.92.

The median age in the city was 42.1 years. 22.1% of residents were under the age of 18; 10.5% were between the ages of 18 and 24; 20.1% were from 25 to 44; 23.6% were from 45 to 64; and 23.8% were 65 years of age or older. The gender makeup of the city was 47.2% male and 52.8% female.

=== 2000 census ===
As of the census of 2000, there were 968 people, 419 households, and 274 families living in the city. The population density was 1,107.1 inhabitants per square mile (427.5/km^{2}). There were 498 housing units at an average density of 569.5 per square mile (219.9/km^{2}). The racial makeup of the city was 99% White, and less than 1% African American, Native American, 5% Asian, and from two or more races. Hispanic or Latino..

There were 419 households, out of which 26.3% had children under the age of 18 living with them, 53.2% were married couples living together, 8.1% had a female householder with no husband present, and 34.4% were non-families. 31.5% of all households were made up of individuals, and 18.6% had someone living alone who was 65 years of age or older. The average household size was 2.21 and the average family size was 2.73.

In the city, the population was spread out, with 21.7% under the age of 18, 7.6% from 18 to 24, 21.1% from 25 to 44, 22.3% from 45 to 64, and 27.3% who were 65 years of age or older. The median age was 45 years. For every 100 females, there were 91.3 males. For every 100 females age 18 and over, there were 86.2 males.

The median income for a household in the city was $26,078, and the median income for a family was $32,333. Males had a median income of $22,969 versus $17,411 for females. The per capita income for the city was $14,978. About 11.3% of families and 15.5% of the population were below the poverty line, including 20.1% of those under age 18 and 18.8% of those age 65 or over.

== Climate ==
Stover's climate is characterized by relatively high temperatures and evenly distributed precipitation throughout the year. The Köppen Climate Classification subtype for this climate is Cfa" (Humid Subtropical Climate).
