= Moreau River (Missouri River tributary) =

River in Missouri, U.S.

Moreau River is a stream in Cole County in the U.S. state of Missouri. It is a tributary of the Missouri River.

The stream headwaters occur at the confluence of North Moreau Creek with South Moreau Creek at 38°29′58″N 92°18′27″W about ten miles southwest of Jefferson City. The stream meanders to the east passing under U.S. Route 54 south of Jefferson City and U.S. Route 50 east of Jefferson City to enter the Missouri River at 38°33′26″N 92°05′10″W. At Jefferson City, the river has a mean annual discharge of 416 cu/ft. per sec.

The Moreau River most likely was named for its dark water, "Moreau" being a word derived from the French meaning "black".

== See also ==
- List of rivers of Missouri
- Tributaries of the Missouri River
