= Gravois Mills, Missouri =

- Town
- Village of Gravois Mills
- Location in Morgan County and the state of Missouri
- Coordinates: 38°18′18″N 92°49′28″W
- Country: United States
- State: Missouri
- County: Morgan

Area
  - Total: 0.82 sq mi (2.13 km^{2})
  - Land: 0.74 sq mi (1.92 km^{2})
  - Water: 0.081 sq mi (0.21 km^{2})
- Elevation: 755 ft (230 m)

Population (2020)
  - Total: 129
  - Density: 174/sq mi (67.1/km^{2})
- Time zone: UTC-6 (Central (CST))
  - Summer (DST): UTC-5 (CDT)
- ZIP codes: 65037, 65038
- Area code: 573
- FIPS code: 29-28828
- GNIS feature ID: 0766158

Gravois Mills (/ˈɡrævɔɪ/ GRAV-oy) is a town in Morgan County, Missouri, United States. The population was 129 at the 2020 census.

== History ==
Gravois Mills was laid out in 1884 and named for a nearby gristmill on Gravois Creek. A post office called Gravois Mills has been in operation since 1860.

Old St. Patrick's Church was listed on the National Register of Historic Places in 1979.

== Geography ==
Gravois Mills is located in southern Morgan County on the upper end of the Gravois Creek arm of the Lake of the Ozarks. Missouri Route 5 passes through the town, leading north 9 miles (14 km) to Versailles, the Morgan county seat, and south 12 miles (19 km) to Sunrise Beach.

According to the U.S. Census Bureau, Gravois Mills has a total area of 0.82 square miles (2.12 km^{2}), of which 0.74 square miles (1.92 km^{2}) are land and 0.08 square miles (0.21 km^{2}), or 9.73%, are water. The village sits on the southwest side of the Gravois Creek arm of the Lake of the Ozarks, 10 miles (16 km) upstream from (northwest of) the arm's confluence with the Osage River.

== Demographics ==
Historical population
Census	Pop.	Note	%±
1960	33		—
1970	34		3.0%
1980	101		197.1%
1990	101		0.0%
2000	208		105.9%
2010	144		−30.8%
2020	129		−10.4%
U.S. Decennial Census

=== 2010 census ===
As of the census of 2010, there were 144 people, 59 households, and 33 families residing in the village. The population density was 194.6 inhabitants per square mile (75.1/km^{2}). There were 108 housing units at an average density of 145.9 per square mile (56.3/km^{2}). The racial makeup of the village was 93.1% White, 1.4% African American, 1.4% Native American, 0.7% from other races, and 3.5% from two or more races. Hispanic or Latino of any race were 4.9% of the population.

There were 59 households, of which 25.4% had children under the age of 18 living with them, 44.1% were married couples living together, 8.5% had a female householder with no husband present, 3.4% had a male householder with no wife present, and 44.1% were non-families. 33.9% of all households were made up of individuals, and 15.3% had someone living alone who was 65 years of age or older. The average household size was 2.44 and the average family size was 3.12.

The median age in the village was 46 years. 21.5% of residents were under the age of 18; 8.4% were between the ages of 18 and 24; 18.8% were from 25 to 44; 31.2% were from 45 to 64; and 20.1% were 65 years of age or older. The gender makeup of the village was 48.6% male and 51.4% female.

=== 2000 census ===
As of the census of 2000, there were 208 people, 101 households, and 56 families residing in the town. The population density was 268.4 inhabitants per square mile (103.6/km^{2}). There were 144 housing units at an average density of 185.8 per square mile (71.7/km^{2}). The racial makeup of the town was 98.56% White, 0.96% African American, and 0.48% from two or more races.

There were 101 households, out of which 22.8% had children under the age of 18 living with them, 39.6% were married couples living together, 10.9% had a female householder with no husband present, and 43.6% were non-families. 36.6% of all households were made up of individuals, and 9.9% had someone living alone who was 65 years of age or older. The average household size was 2.06 and the average family size was 2.68.

In the town the population was spread out, with 22.1% under the age of 18, 8.7% from 18 to 24, 21.6% from 25 to 44, 28.4% from 45 to 64, and 19.2% who were 65 years of age or older. The median age was 44 years. For every 100 females, there were 92.6 males. For every 100 females age 18 and over, there were 80.0 males.

The median income for a household in the town was $24,167, and the median income for a family was $28,750. Males had a median income of $21,250 versus $12,917 for females. The per capita income for the town was $13,060. About 24.1% of families and 26.0% of the population were below the poverty line, including 69.8% of those under the age of eighteen and 10.0% of those 65 or over.
