= Versailles, Missouri =

City in Missouri, U.S.

- City
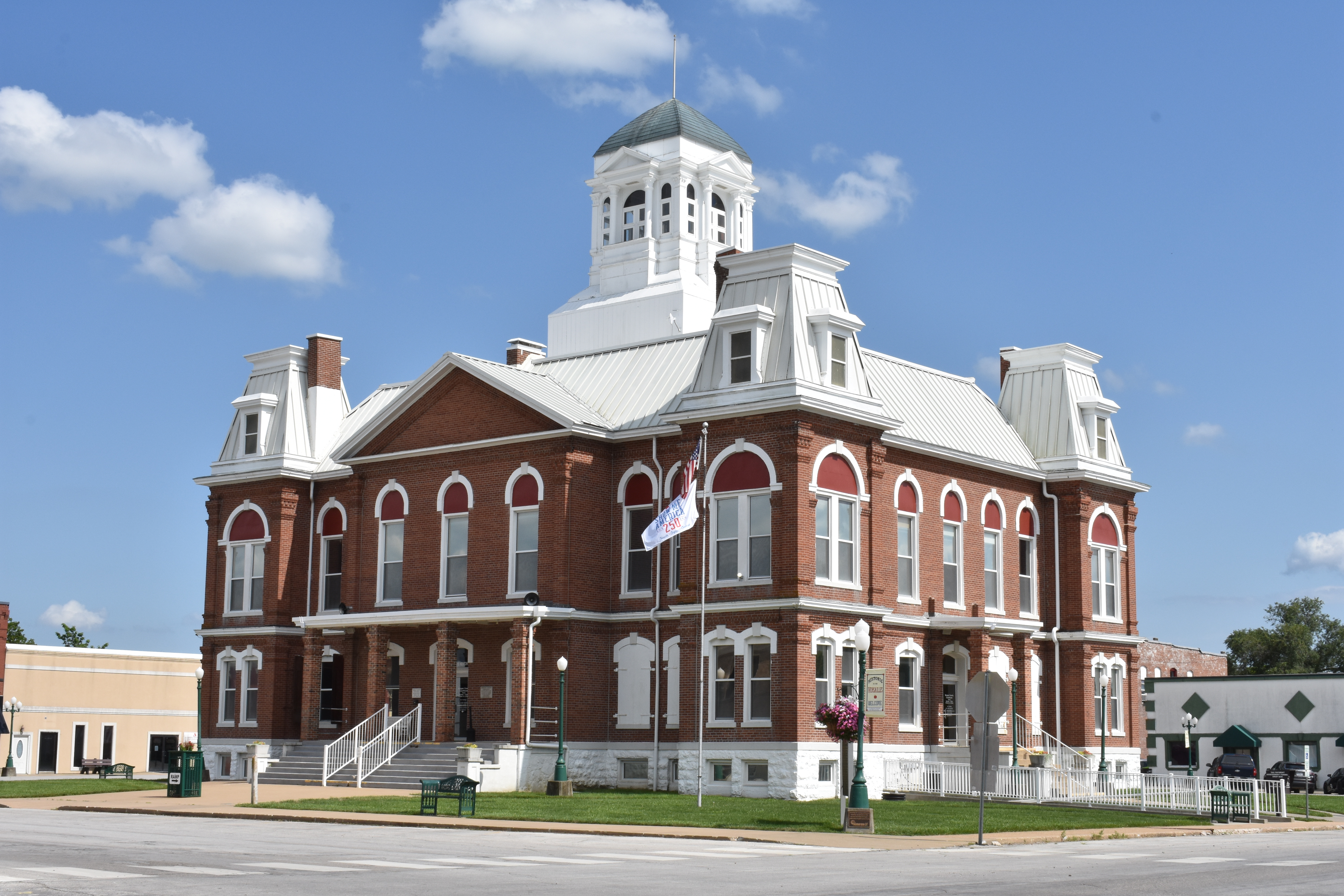
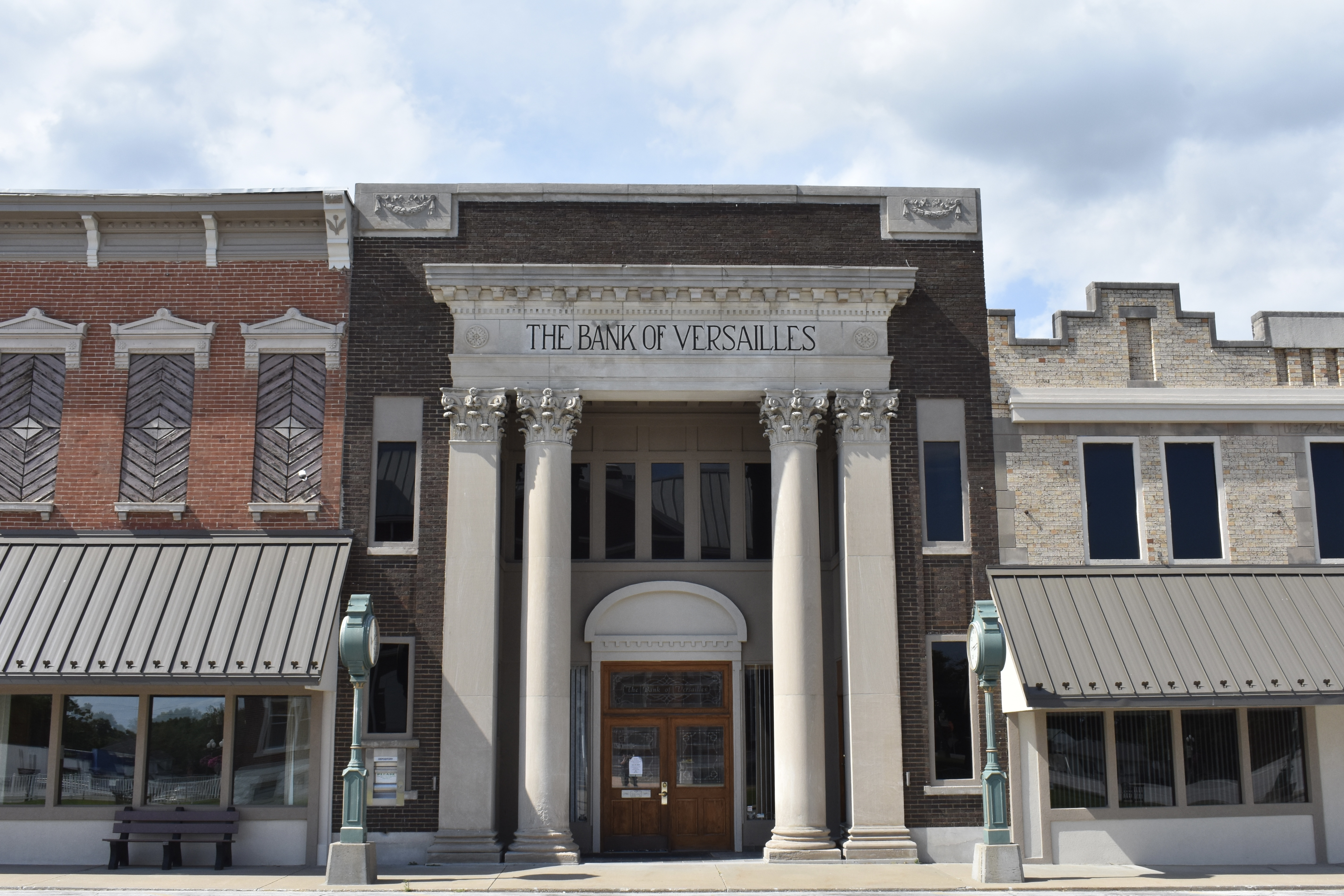
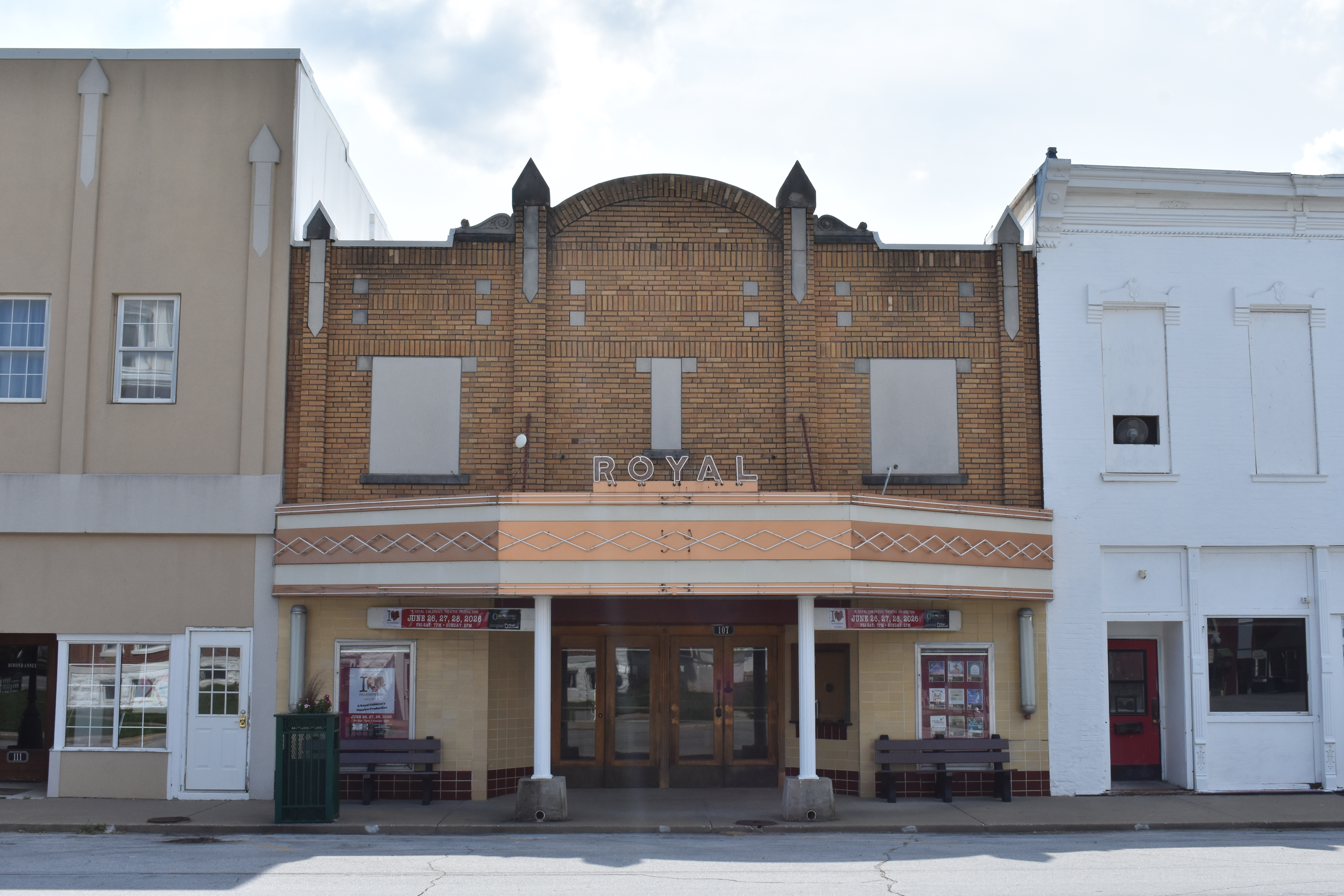
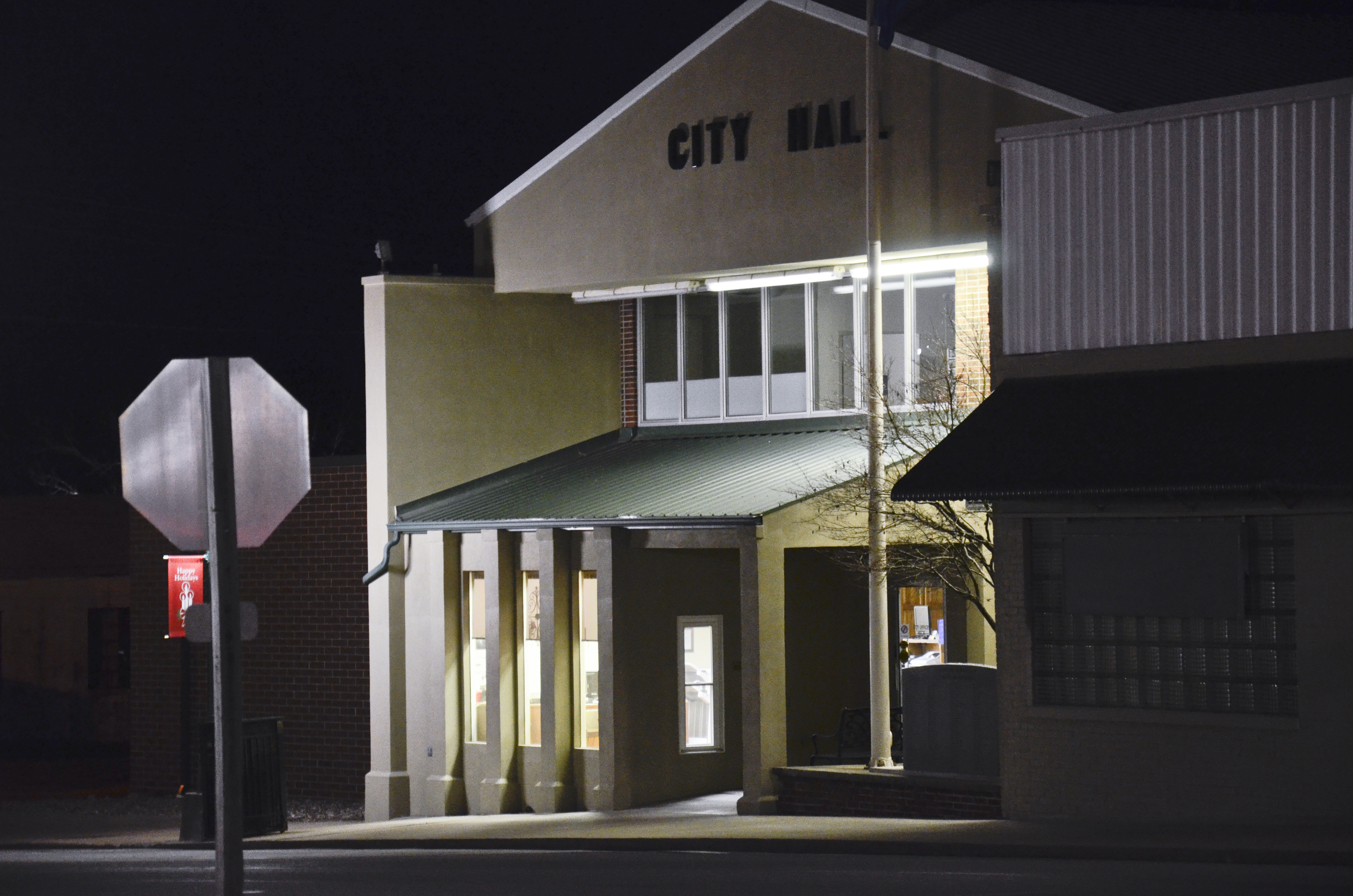
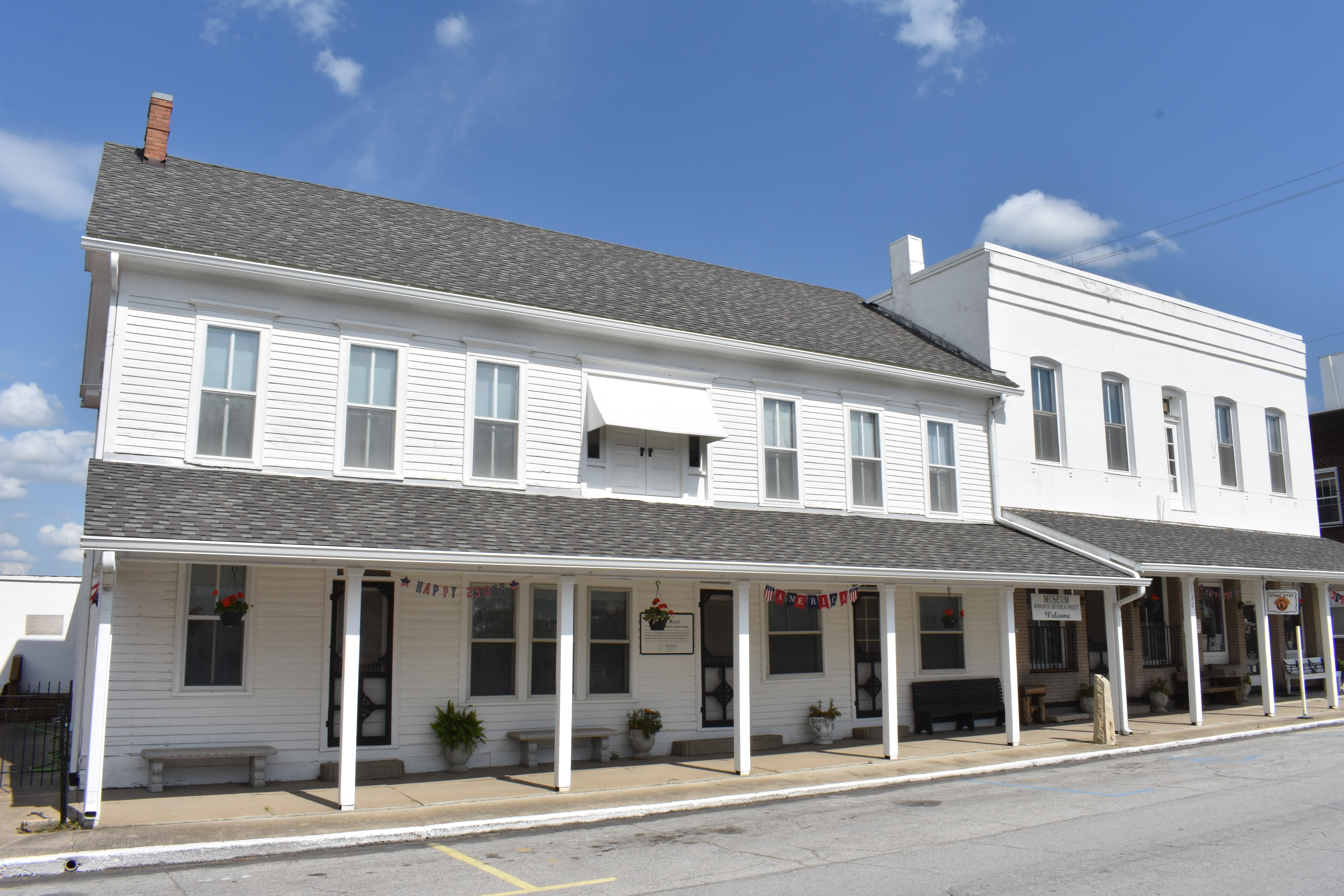
- Morgan County Courthouse Bank of Versailles Royal Theatre City Hall Martin Hotel

- Location in Morgan County and the state of Missouri
- Coordinates: 38°26′00″N 92°50′43″W
- Country: United States
- State: Missouri
- County: Morgan

Government
  - Mayor: Jamie K. Morrow

Area
  - Total: 2.33 sq mi (6.04 km^{2})
  - Land: 2.33 sq mi (6.03 km^{2})
  - Water: 0.0039 sq mi (0.01 km^{2})
- Elevation: 997 ft (304 m)

Population (2020)
  - Total: 2,539
  - Density: 1,090.7/sq mi (421.14/km^{2})
- Time zone: UTC-6 (Central (CST))
  - Summer (DST): UTC-5 (CDT)
- ZIP code: 65084
- Area code: 573
- FIPS code: 29-75922
- GNIS feature ID: 2397131
- Website: www.cityofversaillesmo.com

Versailles (/vɜːrˈseɪlz/ vur-SAYLZ) is a city in and the county seat of Morgan County, Missouri, United States. The population was 2,539 at the 2020 census.

== History ==
A post office called Versailles, after the royal palace in France, has been in operation since 1835. Versailles was not platted until 1854.

The Martin Hotel, built in 1853, had such guests as the showman P. T. Barnum and outlaw robber Jesse James. Since the late 20th century, it has been operated as a museum. Both it and the Morgan County Courthouse are listed on the National Register of Historic Places. The courthouse was designed in a French style.

== Demographics ==
Historical population
Census	Pop.	Note	%±
1880	578		—
1890	1,211		109.5%
1900	1,240		2.4%
1910	1,598		28.9%
1920	1,651		3.3%
1930	1,662		0.7%
1940	1,781		7.2%
1950	1,929		8.3%
1960	2,047		6.1%
1970	2,244		9.6%
1980	2,406		7.2%
1990	2,365		−1.7%
2000	2,565		8.5%
2010	2,482		−3.2%
2020	2,539		2.3%
U.S. Decennial Census

=== 2020 census ===
As of the 2020 census, Versailles had a population of 2,539. The median age was 40.0 years. 23.0% of residents were under the age of 18 and 21.6% of residents were 65 years of age or older. For every 100 females there were 97.7 males, and for every 100 females age 18 and over there were 93.8 males age 18 and over.

0.0% of residents lived in urban areas, while 100.0% lived in rural areas.

There were 1,055 households in Versailles, of which 30.0% had children under the age of 18 living in them. Of all households, 36.2% were married-couple households, 22.6% were households with a male householder and no spouse or partner present, and 36.3% were households with a female householder and no spouse or partner present. About 41.6% of all households were made up of individuals and 20.5% had someone living alone who was 65 years of age or older.

There were 1,214 housing units, of which 13.1% were vacant. The homeowner vacancy rate was 3.9% and the rental vacancy rate was 12.2%.

Racial composition as of the 2020 census
Race	Number	Percent
White	2,255	88.8%
Black or African American	66	2.6%
American Indian and Alaska Native	12	0.5%
Asian	6	0.2%
Native Hawaiian and Other Pacific Islander	2	0.1%
Some other race	42	1.7%
Two or more races	156	6.1%
Hispanic or Latino (of any race)	89	3.5%

=== 2010 census ===
As of the census of 2010, there were 2,482 people, 1,034 households, and 590 families living in the city. The population density was 1,065.2 inhabitants per square mile (411.3/km^{2}). There were 1,201 housing units at an average density of 515.5 per square mile (199.0/km^{2}). The racial makeup of the city was 92.4% White, 2.8% African American, 0.8% Native American, 0.3% Asian, 1.1% from other races, and 2.6% from two or more races. Hispanic or Latino of any race were 3.1% of the population.

There were 1,034 households, of which 28.9% had children under the age of 18 living with them, 37.3% were married couples living together, 15.9% had a female householder with no husband present, 3.9% had a male householder with no wife present, and 42.9% were non-families. 38.7% of all households were made up of individuals, and 20.7% had someone living alone who was 65 years of age or older. The average household size was 2.22 and the average family size was 2.94.

The median age in the city was 40.9 years. 22.8% of residents were under the age of 18; 8.8% were between the ages of 18 and 24; 23.2% were from 25 to 44; 22.9% were from 45 to 64; and 22.4% were 65 years of age or older. The gender makeup of the city was 47.5% male and 52.5% female.

=== 2000 census ===
As of the census of 2000, there were 2,565 people, 1,077 households, and 636 families living in the city. The population density was 1,115.2 inhabitants per square mile (430.6/km^{2}). There were 1,195 housing units at an average density of 519.5 per square mile (200.6/km^{2}). The racial makeup of the city was 95.40% White, 2.14% African American, 0.66% Native American, 0.04% Asian, 0.16% from other races, and 1.60% from two or more races. Hispanic or Latino of any race were 1.05% of the population.

There were 1,077 households, out of which 29.6% had children under the age of 18 living with them, 44.3% were married couples living together, 12.3% had a female householder with no husband present, and 40.9% were non-families. 36.7% of all households were made up of individuals, and 20.7% had someone living alone who was 65 years of age or older. The average household size was 2.25 and the average family size was 2.95.

In the city, the population was spread out, with 24.7% under the age of 18, 8.4% from 18 to 24, 23.4% from 25 to 44, 18.2% from 45 to 64, and 25.3% who were 65 years of age or older. The median age was 40 years. For every 100 females, there were 77.6 males. For every 100 females age 18 and over, there were 70.9 males.

The median income for a household in the city was $23,672, and the median income for a family was $31,088. Males had a median income of $24,054 versus $18,229 for females. The per capita income for the city was $14,200. About 11.4% of families and 16.5% of the population were below the poverty line, including 21.4% of those under age 18 and 10.8% of those age 65 or over.

== Geography ==
Versailles is in eastern Morgan County. Missouri Route 5 passes through the western and northern sides of the city, leading north 17 miles (27 km) to Tipton and south 37 miles (60 km) to Camdenton. Missouri Route 52 joins Route 5 around the north side of Versailles, but leads southeast 17 miles (27 km) to Eldon and west 8 miles (13 km) to Stover.

According to the U.S. Census Bureau, Versailles has a total area of 2.40 square miles (6.22 km^{2}), of which 0.004 square miles (0.010 km^{2}), or 0.17%, are water. The city sits on a ridge which drains north toward the Straight Fork, part of the Moreau River watershed, and south toward Little Gravois Creek, part of the Osage River watershed.

=== Climate ===
Climate data for Versailles, Missouri (1991–2020 normals, extremes 1904–present)
Month	Jan	Feb	Mar	Apr	May	Jun	Jul	Aug	Sep	Oct	Nov	Dec	Year
Record high °F (°C)	80 (27)	83 (28)	85 (29)	93 (34)	103 (39)	105 (41)	115 (46)	112 (44)	105 (41)	96 (36)	86 (30)	75 (24)	115 (46)
Mean daily maximum °F (°C)	40.5 (4.7)	45.5 (7.5)	56.5 (13.6)	66.8 (19.3)	75.2 (24.0)	83.0 (28.3)	87.5 (30.8)	86.5 (30.3)	78.8 (26.0)	67.8 (19.9)	54.9 (12.7)	44.3 (6.8)	65.6 (18.7)
Daily mean °F (°C)	31.3 (−0.4)	35.7 (2.1)	45.8 (7.7)	56.1 (13.4)	65.5 (18.6)	73.9 (23.3)	78.3 (25.7)	76.8 (24.9)	68.7 (20.4)	57.4 (14.1)	45.2 (7.3)	35.3 (1.8)	55.8 (13.2)
Mean daily minimum °F (°C)	22.2 (−5.4)	25.9 (−3.4)	35.0 (1.7)	45.3 (7.4)	55.8 (13.2)	64.8 (18.2)	69.1 (20.6)	67.1 (19.5)	58.5 (14.7)	46.9 (8.3)	35.5 (1.9)	26.3 (−3.2)	46.0 (7.8)
Record low °F (°C)	−18 (−28)	−22 (−30)	−15 (−26)	−2 (−19)	24 (−4)	42 (6)	45 (7)	43 (6)	30 (−1)	18 (−8)	0 (−18)	−23 (−31)	−23 (−31)
Average precipitation inches (mm)	1.76 (45)	2.59 (66)	3.30 (84)	4.62 (117)	5.35 (136)	5.33 (135)	4.27 (108)	3.62 (92)	4.27 (108)	3.74 (95)	3.61 (92)	2.48 (63)	44.94 (1,141)
Average precipitation days (≥ 0.01 in)	5.3	5.6	8.7	9.4	11.1	8.9	7.2	7.2	7.4	8.6	7.6	5.7	92.7
Source: NOAA

== Events ==
Versailles hosts an event known as the Old Tyme Apple Festival every year typically on the first Saturday of October.

== Economy ==
Dixon Ticonderoga, a pencil manufacturing company, had a plant in Versailles until it closed in 2005.

== Education ==
Public education in Versailles is administered by Morgan County R-II School District.

Versailles has a public library, the Morgan County Library.

== Notable people ==
- Dwight Bolinger, linguist
- Bill Laurie, executive
- Joseph Franklin Rutherford, Jehovah's Witness preacher
- Bud Walton, co-founder of Walmart
- June Rae Wood, author

== See also ==
- List of cities in Missouri
- List of Missouri places named after non-U.S. places
