= Morgan County, Missouri =

County in Missouri, United States

- County
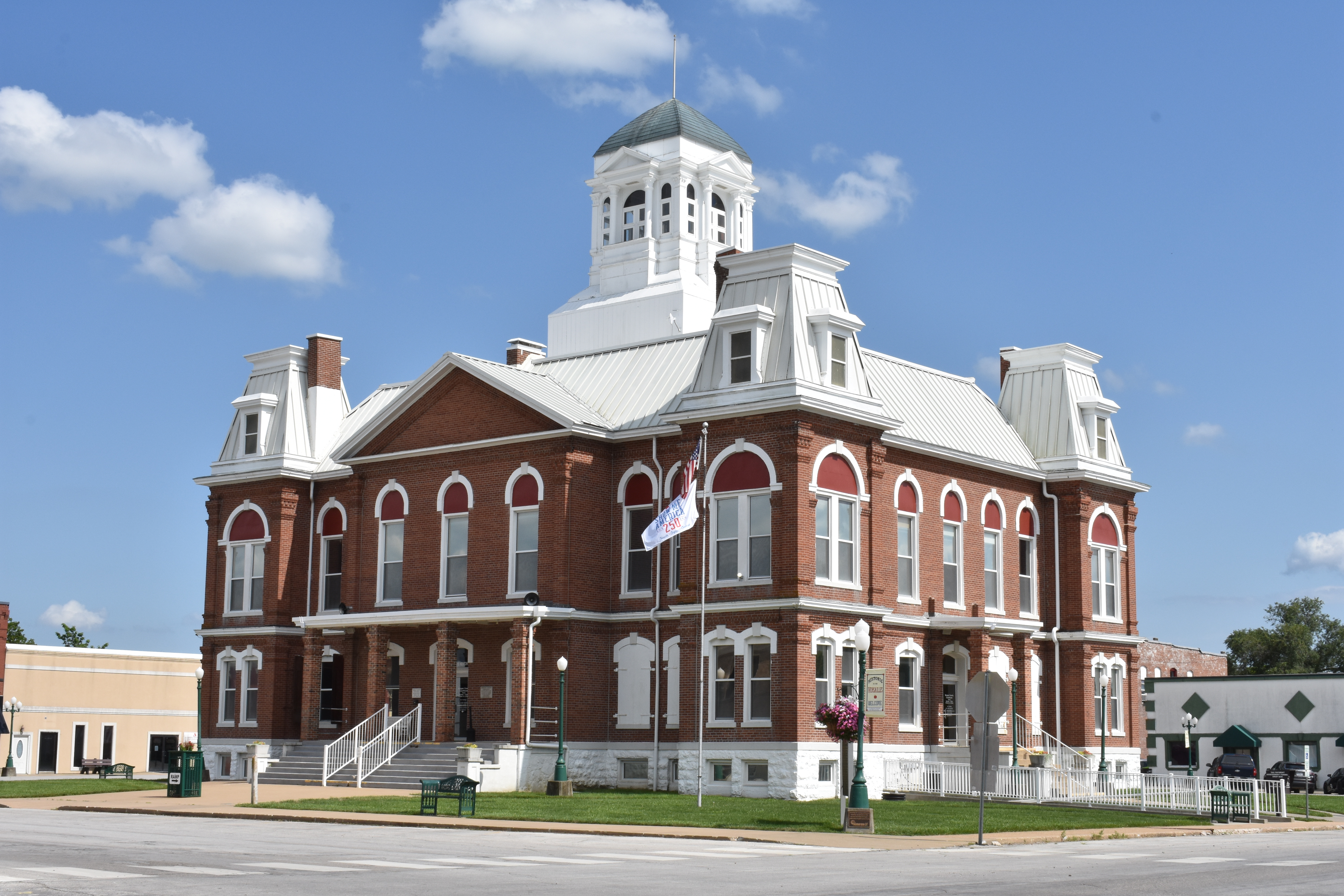
- The Morgan County Courthouse in Versailles

- Location within the U.S. state of Missouri
- Coordinates: 38°26′N 92°53′W
- Country: United States
- State: Missouri
- Founded: January 5, 1833
- Named for: Daniel Morgan
- Seat: Versailles
- Largest city: Versailles

Area
  - Total: 614 sq mi (1,590 km^{2})
  - Land: 598 sq mi (1,550 km^{2})
  - Water: 16 sq mi (41 km^{2}) 2.7%

Population (2020)
  - Total: 21,006
  - Estimate (2025): 22,418 ▲
  - Density: 35.1/sq mi (13.6/km^{2})
- Time zone: UTC−6 (Central)
  - Summer (DST): UTC−5 (CDT)
- Congressional district: 4th
- Website: www.morgancountymo.gov

Morgan County is a county located in the central portion of the U.S. state of Missouri. As of the 2020 census, the population was 21,006. Its county seat is Versailles. The county was organized January 5, 1833, and named for General Daniel Morgan of the American Revolutionary War.

== History ==
Morgan County was organized in 1833 upon separation from Cooper County. It is named in honor of Revolutionary War General Daniel Morgan. Versailles, with a name referring to the French royal estate near Paris, France, was designated as the county seat and platted in 1854.

Established in 1853 there, the Martin Hotel was visited in the post-Civil War period by both showman and circus entrepreneur P. T. Barnum and outlaw robber Jesse James. Listed on the National Register of Historic Places (NRHP) in 1978, it now operates as a museum. In 1858 the Mulhollen Station was a mail stop here for the newly established Butterfield Overland Mail stagecoach line, which carried goods and mail for several years to San Francisco, California.

The Morgan County Courthouse in Versailles, which has also been listed on the NRHP, was designed with French-style details, such as a mansard roof, in keeping with the origin of the town's name. It burned in 1887. The majority of the records were rescued, and the courthouse was soon rebuilt and restored.

Coal mining was historically an important economic activity in Morgan County.

== Geography ==
According to the U.S. Census Bureau, the county has a total area of 614 square miles (1,590 km^{2}), of which 598 square miles (1,550 km^{2}) is land and 16 square miles (41 km^{2}) (2.7%) is water.

=== Adjacent counties ===
- Cooper County (north)
- Moniteau County (northeast)
- Miller County (southeast)
- Camden County (south)
- Benton County (west)
- Pettis County (northwest)

=== Major highways ===
- U.S. Route 50
- Route 5
- Route 52
- Route 135

=== Geographical features ===
- Brewner Hollow
- Sawmill Hollow

== Demographics ==
Historical population
Census	Pop.	Note	%±
1840	4,407		—
1850	4,650		5.5%
1860	8,202		76.4%
1870	8,434		2.8%
1880	10,132		20.1%
1890	12,311		21.5%
1900	12,175		−1.1%
1910	12,863		5.7%
1920	12,015		−6.6%
1930	10,968		−8.7%
1940	11,140		1.6%
1950	10,270		−7.8%
1960	9,476		−7.7%
1970	10,068		6.2%
1980	13,807		37.1%
1990	15,574		12.8%
2000	19,309		24.0%
2010	20,565		6.5%
2020	21,006		2.1%
2025 (est.)	22,418	▲	6.7%
U.S. Decennial Census; 1790-1960 1900-1990; 1990-2000 2010

=== 2020 census ===
As of the 2020 census, the county had a population of 21,006 and a median age of 46.4 years. 22.8% of residents were under the age of 18 and 24.2% of residents were 65 years of age or older. For every 100 females there were 100.8 males, and for every 100 females age 18 and over there were 100.2 males.

The racial makeup of the county was 92.8% White, 0.6% Black or African American, 0.6% American Indian and Alaska Native, 0.3% Asian, 0.0% Native Hawaiian and Pacific Islander, 0.8% from some other race, and 4.9% from two or more races. Hispanic or Latino residents of any race comprised 2.1% of the population.

0.0% of residents lived in urban areas, while 100.0% lived in rural areas.

There were 8,548 households in the county, of which 25.5% had children under the age of 18 living with them and 21.8% had a female householder with no spouse or partner present. About 29.9% of all households were made up of individuals and 15.3% had someone living alone who was 65 years of age or older.

There were 15,110 housing units, of which 43.4% were vacant. Among occupied housing units, 78.8% were owner-occupied and 21.2% were renter-occupied. The homeowner vacancy rate was 2.7% and the rental vacancy rate was 11.0%.

Morgan County, Missouri – Racial and ethnic composition Note: the US Census treats Hispanic/Latino as an ethnic category. This table excludes Latinos from the racial categories and assigns them to a separate category. Hispanics/Latinos may be of any race.
Race / Ethnicity (NH = Non-Hispanic)	Pop 1980	Pop 1990	Pop 2000	Pop 2010	Pop 2020	% 1980	% 1990	% 2000	% 2010	% 2020
White alone (NH)	13,570	15,314	18,693	19,573	19,298	98.28%	98.33%	96.81%	95.18%	91.87%
Black or African American alone (NH)	94	94	97	123	126	0.68%	0.60%	0.50%	0.60%	0.60%
Native American or Alaska Native alone (NH)	55	68	119	113	105	0.40%	0.44%	0.62%	0.55%	0.50%
Asian alone (NH)	7	25	21	75	61	0.05%	0.16%	0.11%	0.36%	0.29%
Native Hawaiian or Pacific Islander alone (NH)	x	x	3	2	8	x	x	0.02%	0.01%	0.04%
Other race alone (NH)	10	4	1	4	57	0.07%	0.03%	0.01%	0.02%	0.27%
Mixed race or Multiracial (NH)	x	x	214	310	905	x	x	1.11%	1.51%	4.31%
Hispanic or Latino (any race)	71	69	161	365	446	0.51%	0.44%	0.83%	1.77%	2.12%
Total	13,807	15,574	19,309	20,565	21,006	100.00%	100.00%	100.00%	100.00%	100.00%

== Education ==
=== Public schools ===
- Morgan County R-I School District – Stover
  - Morgan County R-I Elementary School (PK-04)
  - Morgan County R-I Middle School (05-08)
  - Morgan County R-I High School (09-12)
- Morgan County R-II School District – Versailles
  - Morgan County R-II Elementary School (PK-05)
  - Morgan County R-II South Elementary School (PK-02)
  - Morgan County R-II Middle School (06-08)
  - Morgan County R-II High School (09-12)

=== Private schools ===
- Dogwood Grove School – Versailles (02-09) – Mennonite
- St. Paul Lutheran School – Stover (K-09) – Lutheran

=== Public libraries ===
- Morgan County Library

== Communities ==
=== Cities and towns ===
- Barnett
- Gravois Mills
- Laurie
- Rocky Mount
- Stover
- Syracuse
- Versailles (county seat)

=== Townships ===
- Buffalo Township
- Haw Creek Township
- Mill Creek Township
- Moreau Township
- Osage Township
- Richland Township

=== Unincorporated communities ===
- Aikinsville
- Boylers Mill
- Buck Creek
- Excelsior
- Florence
- Glensted
- Marvin
- Proctor
- Pyrmont
- Riverview
- Rocky Mount

== Politics ==
=== Local ===
The Republican Party controls politics at the local level in Morgan County. Republicans hold all but three of the elected positions in the county.

Morgan County, Missouri

Elected countywide officials
Assessor	Colleen Richardson-Richey	Republican
Circuit Clerk	Monica Cable	Republican
County Clerk	Amiee Worthley	Republican
Collector	Kathy Francis	Democratic
Commissioner (presiding)	Tony Stephans	Republican
Commissioner (eastern district)	Brian Lehman	Republican
Commissioner (western district)	Trent Edgar	Republican
Coroner	Maynard B. Jones	Democratic
Prosecuting Attorney	Dustin Dunklee	Democratic
Public Administrator	Amanda Huffman	Republican
Recorder	Nancy Boles	Republican
Sheriff	Norman dills	Republican
Treasurer	Rhonda Campbell	Republican

=== State ===
Past gubernatorial election results
Year	Republican	Democratic	Third Parties
2024	79.04% 7,588	18.74% 1,799	2.22% 213
2020	78.00% 7,372	19.89% 1,880	2.11% 199
2016	66.35% 5,820	30.66% 2,689	2.99% 262
2012	51.59% 4,575	44.91% 3,983	3.50% 310
2008	47.58% 4,333	50.18% 4,570	2.24% 204
2004	60.18% 5,273	38.54% 3,377	1.27% 112
2000	53.57% 4,207	43.60% 3,424	2.83% 223
1996	45.08% 3,220	51.99% 3,714	2.93% 209

All of Morgan County is in Missouri's 58th Representative District in the Missouri House of Representatives, represented by Willard Haley (R-Eldon).

Missouri House of Representatives — District 58 — Morgan County (2024)
Party	Candidate	Votes	%	±%
Republican	Willard Haley	8,209	100%	

Missouri House of Representatives — District 58 — Morgan County (2022)
Party	Candidate	Votes	%	±%
Republican	Willard Haley	5,960	100.00%	

Missouri House of Representatives — District 58 — Morgan County (2020)
Party	Candidate	Votes	%	±%
Republican	Willard Haley	8,147	100.00%	

All of Morgan County is a part of Missouri's 6th District in the Missouri Senate and is currently represented by Mike Bernskoetter (R-Jefferson City).

Missouri Senate — District 6 — Morgan County (2022)
Party	Candidate	Votes	%	±%
Republican	Mike Bernskoetter	5,921	100%	

Missouri Senate — District 6 — Morgan County (2018)
Party	Candidate	Votes	%	±%
Republican	Mike Bernskoetter	5,578	72.92%	−7.1
Democratic	Nicole Thompson	1,876	24.53%	+4.6
Libertarian	Steven Wilson	194	2.54%	
Write-in	Christina Smith	1	0.01%	

=== Federal ===
U.S. Senate — Missouri — Morgan County (2024)
Party	Candidate	Votes	%	±%
Republican	Josh Hawley	7,243	75.39%	+4.8
Democratic	Lucas Kunce	2,138	22.25%	−3.34
Libertarian	W. C. Young	97	1.01%	−0.31
Green	Nathan Kline	75	0.78%	+0.25
Better Party (Missouri)	Jared Young	55	0.57%	

U.S. Senate — Missouri — Morgan County (2022)
Party	Candidate	Votes	%	±%
Republican	Eric Schmitt	5,150	74.09%	+12.39
Democratic	Trudy Busch Valentine	1,584	22.79%	−10.47
Libertarian	Jonathan Dine	137	1.97%	−0.55
Constitution	Paul Venable	80	1.15%	−0.08

All of Morgan County is included in Missouri's 4th Congressional District and is currently represented by Mark Alford (R-Harrisonville) in the U.S. House of Representatives.

U.S. House of Representatives — Missouri's 4th Congressional District — Morgan County (2024)
Party	Candidate	Votes	%	±%
Republican	Mark Alford	7,247	77.98%	−0.4
Democratic	Jeanette Cass	1,750	18.83%	−0.28
Libertarian	Thomas Holbrook	297	3.2%	+0.67

U.S. House of Representatives — Missouri's 4th Congressional District — Morgan County (2022)
Party	Candidate	Votes	%	±%
Republican	Mark Alford	5,376	78.37%	−0.19
Democratic	Jack Truman	1,311	19.11%	+0.19
Libertarian	Randy Langkraehr	173	2.52%	0

United States presidential election results for Morgan County, Missouri
Year	Republican		Democratic		Third party(ies)	
Year	No.	%	No.	%	No.	%
1888	1,260	47.87%	1,362	51.75%	10	0.38%
1892	1,088	43.21%	1,143	45.39%	287	11.40%
1896	1,366	45.46%	1,628	54.18%	11	0.37%
1900	1,434	49.84%	1,390	48.31%	53	1.84%
1904	1,624	55.60%	1,262	43.20%	35	1.20%
1908	1,663	55.30%	1,315	43.73%	29	0.96%
1912	1,239	45.47%	1,163	42.68%	323	11.85%
1916	1,578	53.19%	1,368	46.11%	21	0.71%
1920	2,911	60.90%	1,834	38.37%	35	0.73%
1924	2,489	56.61%	1,842	41.89%	66	1.50%
1928	3,017	67.68%	1,432	32.12%	9	0.20%
1932	2,000	41.61%	2,768	57.58%	39	0.81%
1936	2,993	53.48%	2,585	46.19%	18	0.32%
1940	3,166	56.98%	2,376	42.76%	14	0.25%
1944	2,896	62.40%	1,735	37.38%	10	0.22%
1948	2,365	55.80%	1,862	43.94%	11	0.26%
1952	3,390	65.86%	1,750	34.00%	7	0.14%
1956	3,163	59.75%	2,131	40.25%	0	0.00%
1960	3,239	62.07%	1,979	37.93%	0	0.00%
1964	2,742	52.63%	2,468	47.37%	0	0.00%
1968	2,906	57.44%	1,649	32.60%	504	9.96%
1972	4,021	70.47%	1,685	29.53%	0	0.00%
1976	2,831	50.60%	2,738	48.94%	26	0.46%
1980	3,577	57.86%	2,460	39.79%	145	2.35%
1984	4,392	66.94%	2,169	33.06%	0	0.00%
1988	3,958	60.13%	2,604	39.56%	20	0.30%
1992	2,819	36.28%	2,906	37.40%	2,045	26.32%
1996	3,059	42.89%	3,006	42.14%	1,068	14.97%
2000	4,460	56.59%	3,235	41.05%	186	2.36%
2004	5,657	64.50%	3,053	34.81%	61	0.70%
2008	5,451	59.58%	3,565	38.97%	133	1.45%
2012	5,733	65.99%	2,773	31.92%	182	2.09%
2016	6,760	76.64%	1,768	20.04%	293	3.32%
2020	7,442	78.44%	1,924	20.28%	121	1.28%
2024	7,725	79.35%	1,914	19.66%	96	0.99%

== See also ==
- National Register of Historic Places listings in Morgan County, Missouri
