= National Register of Historic Places listings in Missouri =

This is a list of properties and historic districts in Missouri on the National Register of Historic Places. There are NRHP listings in all of Missouri's 114 counties and the one independent city of St. Louis.

Contents: Counties in Missouri (links in italic lead to a new page)
Adair - Andrew - Atchison - Audrain - Barry - Barton - Bates - Benton - Bollinger - Boone - Buchanan - Butler - Caldwell - Callaway - Camden - Cape Girardeau - Carroll - Carter - Cass - Cedar - Chariton - Christian - Clark - Clay - Clinton - Cole - Cooper - Crawford - Dade - Dallas - Daviess - DeKalb - Dent - Douglas - Dunklin - Franklin - Gasconade - Gentry - Greene - Grundy - Harrison - Henry - Hickory - Holt - Howard - Howell - Iron - Jackson - Jasper - Jefferson - Johnson - Knox - Laclede - Lafayette - Lawrence - Lewis - Lincoln - Linn - Livingston - Macon - Madison - Maries - Marion - McDonald - Mercer - Miller - Mississippi - Moniteau - Monroe - Montgomery - Morgan - New Madrid - Newton - Nodaway - Oregon - Osage - Ozark - Pemiscot - Perry - Pettis - Phelps - Pike - Platte - Polk - Pulaski - Putnam - Ralls - Randolph - Ray - Reynolds - Ripley - St. Charles - St. Clair - St. Francois - St. Louis (city) - St. Louis County - Ste. Genevieve - Saline - Schuyler - Scotland - Scott - Shannon - Shelby - Stoddard - Stone - Sullivan - Taney - Texas - Vernon - Warren - Washington - Wayne - Webster - Worth - Wright

This National Park Service list is complete through NPS recent listings posted November 13, 2026.

== Current listings by county ==
The following are approximate tallies of current listings by county. These counts are based on entries in the National Register Information Database as of March 13, 2009 and new weekly listings posted since then on the National Register of Historic Places web site. There are frequent additions to the listings and occasional delistings and the counts here are approximate and not official. New entries are added to the official Register on a weekly basis. Also, the counts in this table exclude boundary increase and decrease listings which modify the area covered by an existing property or district and which carry a separate National Register reference number.

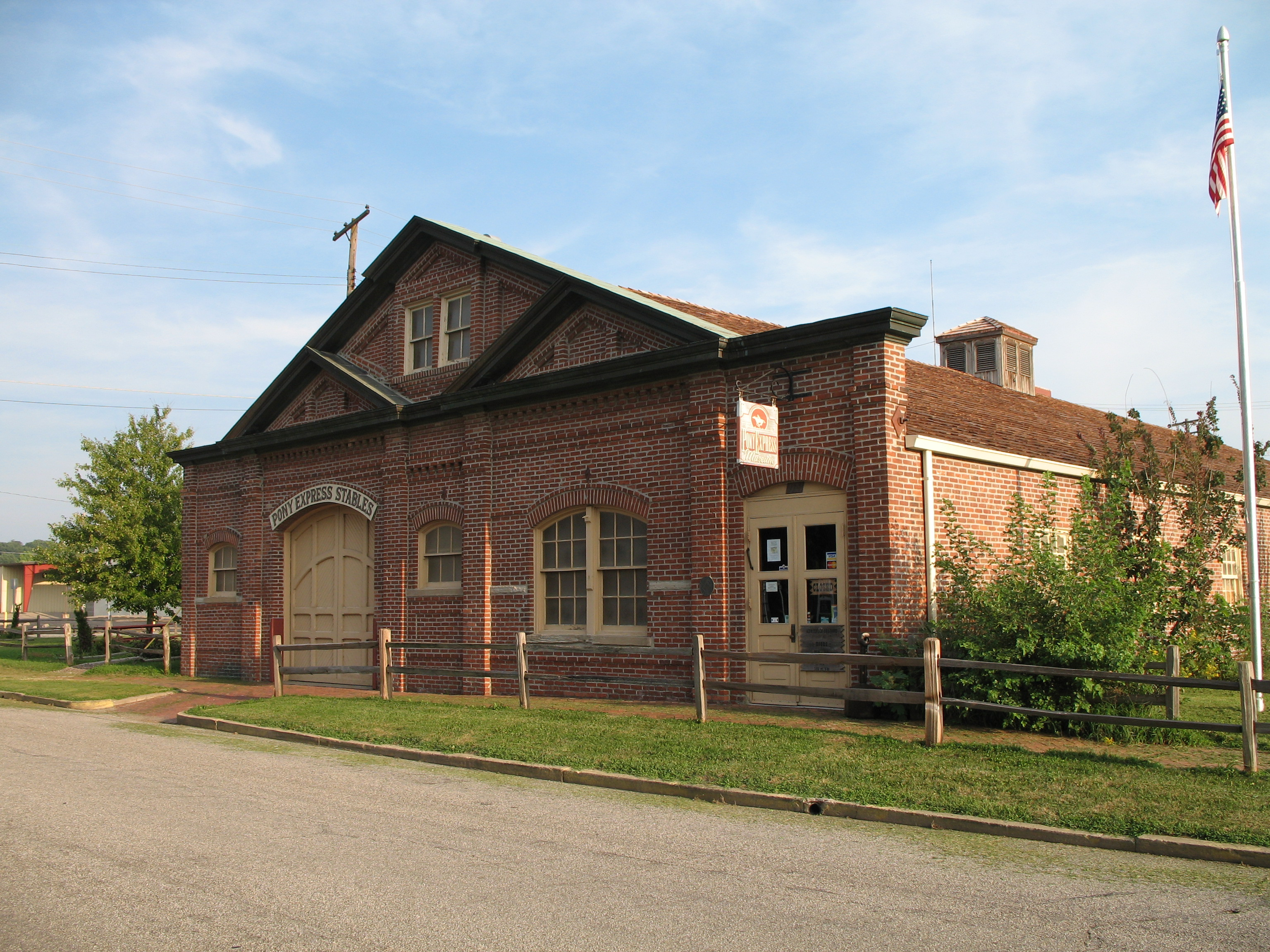
Pony Express Stables, in Buchanan County

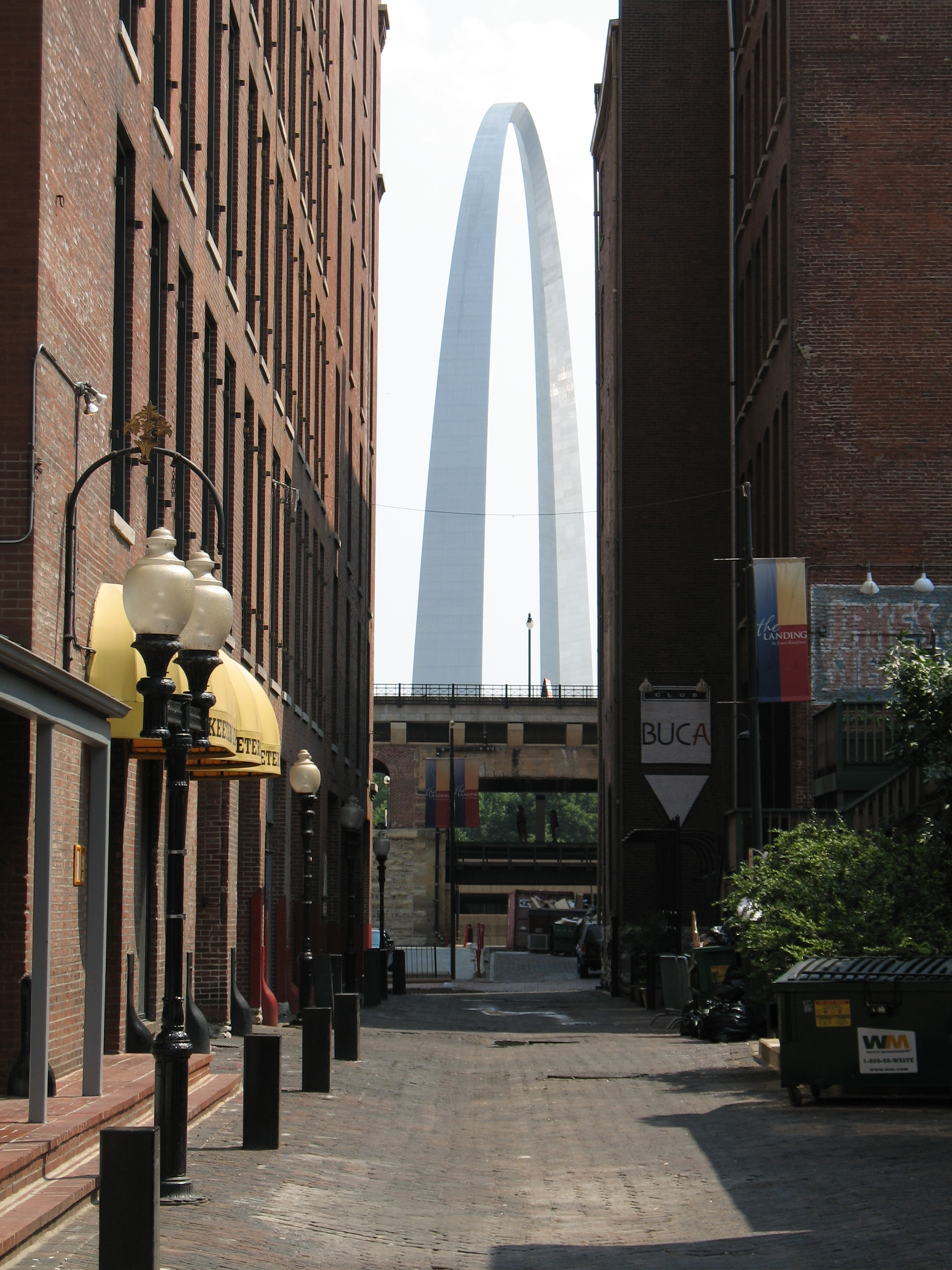
The Gateway Arch viewed from Laclede's Landing

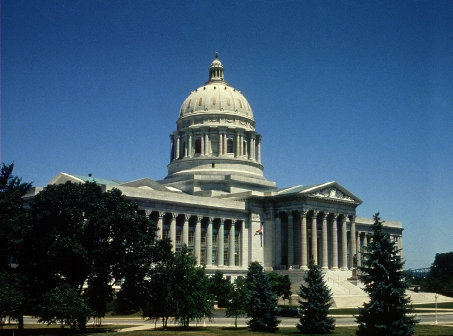
Missouri State Capitol

	County	# of Sites
1	Adair	21
2	Andrew	3
3	Atchison	8
4	Audrain	4
5	Barry	18
6	Barton	1
7	Bates	4
8	Benton	4
9	Bollinger	2
10	Boone	51
11	Buchanan	63
12	Butler	25
13	Caldwell	3
14	Callaway	22
15	Camden	10
16	Cape Girardeau	62
17	Carroll	6
18	Carter	31
19	Cass	7
20	Cedar	3
21	Chariton	7
22	Christian	3
23	Clark	6
24	Clay	39
25	Clinton	1
26	Cole	53
27	Cooper	44
28	Crawford	14
29	Dade	2
30	Dallas	2
31	Daviess	3
32	DeKalb	3
33	Dent	8
34	Douglas	2
35	Dunklin	8
36	Franklin	61
37	Gasconade	10
38	Gentry	4
39	Greene	73
40	Grundy	7
41	Harrison	2
42	Henry	8
43	Hickory	3
44	Holt	3
45	Howard	25
46	Howell	7
47	Iron	6
48.1	Jackson: Downtown Kansas City	151
48.2	Jackson: Kansas City other	186
48.3	Jackson: Other	52
48.4	Duplicates	(1)
48.5	Jackson: Total	388
49	Jasper	43
50	Jefferson	15
51	Johnson	22
52	Knox	1
53	Laclede	7
54	Lafayette	32
55	Lawrence	5
56	Lewis	12
57	Lincoln	5
58	Linn	10
59	Livingston	4
60	Macon	9
61	Madison	5
62	Maries	1
63	Marion	41
64	McDonald	4
65	Mercer	2
66	Miller	8
67	Mississippi	12
68	Moniteau	11
69	Monroe	10
70	Montgomery	9
71	Morgan	5
72	New Madrid	10
73	Newton	12
74	Nodaway	9
75	Oregon	3
76	Osage	9
77	Ozark	2
78	Pemiscot	8
79	Perry	10
80	Pettis	28
81	Phelps	11
82	Pike	21
83	Platte	16
84	Polk	4
85	Pulaski	7
86	Putnam	1
87	Ralls	9
88	Randolph	6
89	Ray	6
90	Reynolds	2
91	Ripley	9
92	St. Charles	36
93	St. Clair	3
94	St. Francois	11
95.1	St. Louis (city): Downtown and West	135
95.2	St. Louis (city): Northwest	198
95.3	St. Louis (city): Southwest	120
95	St. Louis (city): Total	453
96	St. Louis County	193
97	Ste. Genevieve	6
98	Saline	32
99	Schuyler	2
100	Scotland	3
101	Scott	8
102	Shannon	17
103	Shelby	4
104	Stoddard	5
105	Stone	4
106	Sullivan	6
107	Taney	5
108	Texas	5
109	Vernon	8
110	Warren	8
111	Washington	11
112	Wayne	3
113	Webster	3
114	Worth	1
115	Wright	5
(duplicates)		(12)
Total:		2,414

== Andrew County ==
	Name on the Register	Image	Date listed	Location	City or town	Description
1	Andrew County Courthouse	Andrew County Courthouse	September 11, 1980 (#80002308)	4th and Main Sts. 39°56′29″N 94°49′45″W	Savannah	
2	J. F. Roberts Octagonal Barn	J. F. Roberts Octagonal Barn	November 18, 1999 (#99001362)	Jct. MO B and MO 48; 40°03′47″N 94°44′44″W	Rea	
3	Walnut Park Farm Historic District	Walnut Park Farm Historic District	December 22, 1999 (#99001597)	Jct. of MO 59 and MO 71; 39°49′56″N 94°48′46″W	St. Joseph	

== Audrain County ==
	Name on the Register	Image	Date listed	Location	City or town	Description
1	Audrain County Courthouse	Audrain County Courthouse	July 25, 2012 (#12000434)	101 N. Jefferson St. 39°10′21″N 91°52′59″W	Mexico	
2	Lincoln School	Lincoln School	February 16, 1996 (#96000060)	301 Lincoln St. 39°18′17″N 91°29′33″W	Vandalia	
3	Ross House	Ross House	July 26, 1978 (#78001637)	501 S. Muldrow St. 39°10′06″N 91°53′21″W	Mexico	
4	Arthur Simmons Stables Historic District	Arthur Simmons Stables Historic District	December 4, 2004 (#04001286)	621 and 701 W. Boulevard St. 39°09′51″N 91°53′25″W	Mexico	

== Barton County ==
	Name on the Register	Image	Date listed	Location	City or town	Description
1	Harry Truman Birthplace Memorial	Harry Truman Birthplace Memorial	June 23, 1969 (#69000089)	N corner, 11th St. and Truman Ave. 37°29′40″N 94°16′17″W	Lamar	

== Bates County ==
	Name on the Register	Image	Date listed	Location	City or town	Description
1	Bates County Courthouse	Bates County Courthouse	June 28, 2001 (#01000684)	1 North Delaware; 38°15′28″N 94°21′19″W	Butler	
2	Hudson City School	Hudson City School	October 10, 2002 (#02001110)	Approx. 1 mile NW of MO 52 and Hwy. W 38°12′12″N 94°05′25″W	Appleton City	
3	Palace Hotel	Palace Hotel	July 19, 2002 (#02000795)	2-4 W. Ohio St. 38°15′31″N 94°19′54″W	Butler	
4	Papinville Marais des Cygnes River Bridge	Papinville Marais des Cygnes River Bridge	October 22, 2002 (#02001192)	Cty. Rd. 648 over the Marais des Cygenes R. 38°04′06″N 94°13′54″W	Papinville	

== Benton County ==
	Name on the Register	Image	Date listed	Location	City or town	Description
1	Central Cole Camp Historic District	Central Cole Camp Historic District	April 11, 2002 (#02000355)	Roughly consists of the 100 blocks of E. and W. Main St., most of Maple St., 105 E. Butterfield, 106 N. Olive, and 107 N. Boonville; 38°27′35″N 93°14′14″W	Cole Camp	
2	Rodgers Shelter Archeological Site		June 23, 1969 (#69000090)	Right bank of the Pomme de Terre River, 5 miles (8.0 km) by road southwest of Fristoe; 38°05′34″N 93°20′43″W	Fristoe	
3	Augustus Sander House		June 9, 2004 (#04000581)	408 W. Jefferson St. 38°27′21″N 93°12′22″W	Cole Camp	
4	Upper Bridge	Upper Bridge	September 17, 1999 (#99001159)	Old Highway A, over Osage River; 38°14′39″N 93°23′16″W	Warsaw	

== Bollinger County ==
	Name on the Register	Image	Date listed	Location	City or town	Description
1	Will Mayfield College Arts and Science Building	Will Mayfield College Arts and Science Building	May 25, 2005 (#05000929)	207 Mayfield Dr. 37°18′31″N 89°58′28″W	Marble Hill	
2	Will Mayfield College Campus	Will Mayfield College Campus	January 14, 2013 (#12001176)	207 Mayfield Dr. 37°18′31″N 89°58′30″W	Marble Hill	Now the site of the Bollinger County Museum of Natural History

== Caldwell County ==
	Name on the Register	Image	Date listed	Location	City or town	Description
1	Caldwell County Courthouse	Caldwell County Courthouse	January 13, 1972 (#72000707)	49 E. Main St. 39°38′28″N 94°02′13″W	Kingston	
2	Far West	Far West	September 22, 1970 (#70000324)	5.5 miles (8.9 km) west of Kingston via County Roads D and H 39°40′17″N 94°07′52″W	Kingston	
3	P.A. Switzer Residence		January 4, 2024 (#100009692)	211 E. Samuel St. 39°44′47″N 93°59′45″W	Hamilton	

== Cedar County ==
	Name on the Register	Image	Date listed	Location	City or town	Description
1	Caplinger Mills Historic District	Caplinger Mills Historic District	September 2, 1993 (#93000903)	Junction of Washington Ave. and the Sac River; 37°47′51″N 93°48′21″W	Caplinger Mills	
2	Montgomery Archeological Site		September 21, 1978 (#78001639)	Address Restricted	Stockton	
3	Stockton Community Building	Stockton Community Building	December 10, 1998 (#98001502)	Junction of Spring and North Sts. 37°42′00″N 93°47′46″W	Stockton	

== Christian County ==
	Name on the Register	Image	Date listed	Location	City or town	Description
1	Ozark Courthouse Square Historic District	Ozark Courthouse Square Historic District	February 5, 2009 (#08001409)	Portions of 2nd Ave. and Church, Elm, and 2nd Sts. on the courthouse square 37°01′11″N 93°12′29″W	Ozark	
2	Smallin Cave Historic District		March 8, 2018 (#100002186)	3575 N Smallin Rd. 37°03′04″N 93°11′12″W	Ozark vicinity	
3	Southwest Missouri Prehistoric Rock Shelter and Cave Sites Discontiguous Archeological District		October 24, 1991 (#91002046)	Address Restricted	Chadwick	

== Clinton County ==
	Name on the Register	Image	Date listed	Location	City or town	Description
1	David L. and Sallie Ann Stoutimore House	David L. and Sallie Ann Stoutimore House	July 23, 2013 (#13000536)	501 S. Birch Ave. 39°33′39″N 94°27′06″W	Plattsburg	

== Dade County ==
	Name on the Register	Image	Date listed	Location	City or town	Description
1	Greenfield Opera House Building	Greenfield Opera House Building	December 10, 1998 (#98001504)	Junction of Water and Allison Sts. 37°24′53″N 93°50′27″W	Greenfield	
2	Washington Hotel		October 16, 2002 (#02001178)	2 S. Main St. 37°24′56″N 93°50′24″W	Greenfield	

=== Former listing ===
	Name on the Register	Image	Date listed	Date removed	Location	City or town	Description
1	Dilday Mill		August 26, 1977 (#77000805)	December 19, 1994	Southeast of South Greenfield on Turnback Creek	South Greenfield	Collapsed in 1982.

== Dallas County ==
	Name on the Register	Image	Date listed	Location	City or town	Description
1	Bennett Spring State Park Hatchery-Lodge Area Historic District	Bennett Spring State Park Hatchery-Lodge Area Historic District	March 4, 1985 (#85000504)	Route A64; 37°43′31″N 92°51′24″W	Bennett Spring	At Bennett Spring State Park
2	Bennett Spring State Park Shelter House and Water Gauge Station	Bennett Spring State Park Shelter House and Water Gauge Station	February 28, 1985 (#85000527)	Off Route A64; 37°43′01″N 92°51′27″W	Bennett Spring	At Bennett Spring State Park

== Daviess County ==
	Name on the Register	Image	Date listed	Location	City or town	Description
1	Daviess County Courthouse	Daviess County Courthouse	November 14, 1980 (#80002350)	Public Sq. 39°54′55″N 93°57′44″W	Gallatin	
2	Daviess County Rotary Jail and Sheriff's Residence	Daviess County Rotary Jail and Sheriff's Residence	February 23, 1990 (#90000131)	310 W. Jackson; 39°54′55″N 93°57′50″W	Gallatin	
3	A. Taylor Ray House	A. Taylor Ray House	April 12, 1982 (#82003135)	212 W. Van Buren St. 39°54′48″N 93°57′50″W	Gallatin	

== DeKalb County ==
	Name on the Register	Image	Date listed	Location	City or town	Description
1	Dalton-Uphoff House		April 12, 1982 (#82004634)	North of Stewartsville; 39°51′12″N 94°29′58″W	Stewartsville	
2	DeKalb County Courthouse	DeKalb County Courthouse	February 5, 1998 (#98000068)	109 W. Main St. 39°53′24″N 94°21′35″W	Maysville	
3	Absolom Riggs House		April 12, 1982 (#82004635)	SR 1; 39°55′32″N 94°15′12″W	Weatherby	

== Douglas County ==
	Name on the Register	Image	Date listed	Location	City or town	Description
1	Ava Ranger Station Historic District	Ava Ranger Station Historic District	August 4, 2003 (#03000714)	Route 5S; 36°56′15″N 92°39′41″W	Ava	Old tractor by the Ava ranger station
2	Southwest Missouri Prehistoric Rock Shelter and Cave Sites Discontiguous Archeological District		October 24, 1991 (#91002046)	Address Restricted	Dogwood	

== Gentry County ==
	Name on the Register	Image	Date listed	Location	City or town	Description
1	Albany Carnegie Public Library	Albany Carnegie Public Library	February 23, 1990 (#90000130)	101 W. Clay St. 40°14′52″N 94°19′55″W	Albany	
2	Gentry County Courthouse	Gentry County Courthouse	September 18, 1980 (#80002352)	Public Sq. 40°11′43″N 94°20′01″W	Albany	
3	Opera Hall Block		May 9, 2002 (#02000472)	101-03 W. Vermont/101-03 S. Connecticut; 40°03′04″N 94°31′25″W	King City	
4	Samuel and Pauline Peery House		August 11, 2005 (#05000881)	1105 N. Hundley St. 40°15′21″N 94°19′51″W	Albany	

== Harrison County ==
	Name on the Register	Image	Date listed	Location	City or town	Description
1	Hamilton House	Hamilton House	April 11, 1985 (#85000733)	1228 W. Main; 40°16′06″N 94°02′17″W	Bethany	
2	Slatten House		July 9, 1984 (#84002553)	Route 4; 40°16′24″N 93°56′34″W	Bethany	

== Hickory County ==
	Name on the Register	Image	Date listed	Location	City or town	Description
1	Christian and Rosina Gerber Farmstead		January 26, 2023 (#100008571)	15753 Cty. Rd. 202; 37°55′42″N 93°27′43″W	Weaubleau vicinity	
2	Quincy Public Hall		April 7, 1995 (#95000370)	Route 83; 38°00′31″N 93°28′17″W	Quincy	
3	John Siddle Williams House		September 27, 1980 (#80002356)	Off U.S. Route 54; 37°56′33″N 93°19′10″W	Hermitage	

== Holt County ==
	Name on the Register	Image	Date listed	Location	City or town	Description
1	Chicago, Burlington and Quincy Depot	Chicago, Burlington and Quincy Depot	December 12, 1978 (#78001648)	S. State St. 40°07′43″N 95°13′52″W	Mound City	
2	City Hall	City Hall	June 27, 1979 (#79001362)	Route 111; 39°58′57″N 95°11′25″W	Forest City	
3	St. John's Evangelical Lutheran Church and Parochial School	St. John's Evangelical Lutheran Church and Parochial School	January 4, 2008 (#07001339)	112 Walters St. 40°14′52″N 95°27′16″W	Corning	

=== Former listings ===
	Name on the Register	Image	Date listed	Date removed	Location	City or town	Description
1	Carroll Stagecoach Inn		August 18, 1983 (#83000993)	December 19, 1994	East of Oregon	Oregon	Demolished in December, 1993.
2	Rulo Bridge	Rulo Bridge	January 4, 1993 (#92000718)	November 16, 2015	U.S. Route 159 over the Missouri River; 40°03′14″N 95°25′14″W	Fortescue	Demolished (imploded) in 2014.

== Knox County ==
	Name on the Register	Image	Date listed	Location	City or town	Description
1	Edina Double Square Historic District	Edina Double Square Historic District	July 28, 1999 (#99000902)	118-124 S. Main St.; also roughly along portions of Main and E. Lafayette Sts. 40°10′06″N 92°10′21″W	Edina	Second set of boundaries represents a boundary increase of March 13, 2002

== Lawrence County ==
	Name on the Register	Image	Date listed	Location	City or town	Description
1	Lewis Shaw Coleman House	Lewis Shaw Coleman House	October 17, 2016 (#16000727)	227 E. College St. 36°58′18″N 93°43′02″W	Aurora	
2	Lawrence County Bank Building		March 10, 2005 (#05000119)	100 W. Commercial St. 36°56′41″N 94°00′10″W	Pierce City	
3	Lawrence County Courthouse	Lawrence County Courthouse	September 23, 1980 (#80002374)	City Sq. 37°06′12″N 93°49′06″W	Mount Vernon	
4	Old Spanish Fort Archeological Site		January 25, 1971 (#71000469)	In and around the Spanish Fort Cemetery, south of Mount Vernon; 37°03′14″N 93°49′54″W	Mount Vernon	
5	Pierce City Fire Station, Courthouse and Jail		August 28, 1998 (#98001108)	Walnut St. 36°56′44″N 94°00′11″W	Pierce City	

== Livingston County ==
	Name on the Register	Image	Date listed	Location	City or town	Description
1	Chillicothe Commercial Historic District	Chillicothe Commercial Historic District	October 16, 2002 (#02001176)	Roughly bounded Clay, Ann, Washington, and Locust Sts. 39°47′32″N 93°33′09″W	Chillicothe	
2	Chillicothe Industrial Home for Girls	Chillicothe Industrial Home for Girls	April 19, 2010 (#10000182)	1500 Third St. 39°47′22″N 93°33′45″W	Chillicothe	
3	Courthouse Square Historic District	Courthouse Square Historic District	October 16, 2002 (#02001177)	Roughly bounded by Calhoun, Jackson, Washington, and Elm Sts. 39°47′39″N 93°33′09″W	Chillicothe	
4	Grace Episcopal Church and Building	Grace Episcopal Church and Building	September 17, 1980 (#80002375)	421 Elm St. 39°47′29″N 93°33′04″W	Chillicothe	

== Maries County ==
	Name on the Register	Image	Date listed	Location	City or town	Description
1	Maries County Jail and Sheriff's House	Maries County Jail and Sheriff's House	March 1, 2002 (#02000101)	Junction of 5th and Mill Sts. 38°11′11″N 91°56′46″W	Vienna	

== McDonald County ==
	Name on the Register	Image	Date listed	Location	City or town	Description
1	Old McDonald County Courthouse	Old McDonald County Courthouse	May 1, 2012 (#12000251)	400 N. Main St. 36°35′37″N 94°23′01″W	Pineville	
2	Old McDonald County Jail		July 20, 2020 (#100005347)	200 East 3rd St. 36°35′34″N 94°23′00″W	Pineville	
3	Pineville Site		July 28, 1999 (#99000903)	Address Restricted	Pineville	
4	Powell Bridge	Powell Bridge	April 20, 2011 (#11000215)	0.4 miles (0.64 km) southwest of Powell on Cowan Ridge Rd. off Highway E 36°36′57″N 94°10′56″W	Powell	

== Mercer County ==
	Name on the Register	Image	Date listed	Location	City or town	Description
1	Herbert Cain and Corah Brantley Casteel House		July 14, 1995 (#95000781)	Address Restricted	Princeton	
2	Leo Ellis Post No. 22, American Legion Building	Leo Ellis Post No. 22, American Legion Building	April 26, 1996 (#96000478)	804 Grant St. 40°24′01″N 93°35′03″W	Princeton	

== Morgan County ==
	Name on the Register	Image	Date listed	Location	City or town	Description
1	Martin Hotel	Martin Hotel	September 6, 1978 (#78001669)	118 N. Monroe St. 38°25′57″N 92°50′29″W	Versailles	
2	Morgan County Courthouse	Morgan County Courthouse	January 10, 1980 (#80002383)	Courthouse Sq. 38°25′53″N 92°51′11″W	Versailles	
3	Old St. Patrick's Church		March 2, 1979 (#79001384)	South of Gravois Mills on Route 0; 38°12′44″N 92°49′33″W	Gravois Mills	
4	Jesse Ratcliff House		April 12, 1982 (#82003154)	Northeast of Barnett; 38°24′09″N 92°38′17″W	Barnett	
5	Second Baptist Church and Booker T. Washington School Historic District		July 20, 2020 (#100005348)	313 South Monroe St. 38°25′41″N 92°50′32″W	Versailles	

== Oregon County ==
	Name on the Register	Image	Date listed	Location	City or town	Description
1	Church of the Holy Trinity		July 24, 2017 (#100001352)	117 N. 5th St. 36°31′28″N 91°32′37″W	Thayer	
2	Greer Mill		January 26, 2006 (#05001551)	Western side of Route 10, 10 miles (16 km) north of Alton; 36°47′11″N 91°20′33″W	Alton	
3	Pigman Mound Archeological Site		March 4, 1971 (#71000472)	Address Restricted	Riverton	

== Ozark County ==
	Name on the Register	Image	Date listed	Location	City or town	Description
1	John Conkin and Clara Layton Harlin House	John Conkin and Clara Layton Harlin House	October 22, 2003 (#03001065)	403 Harlin Dr. 36°36′20″N 92°25′48″W	Gainesville	
2	Hodgson-Aid Mill	Hodgson-Aid Mill	February 12, 2002 (#02000015)	Route 181; 36°42′28″N 92°15′59″W	Sycamore	Historic grist mill on Bryant Creek

== Polk County ==
	Name on the Register	Image	Date listed	Location	City or town	Description
1	Bolivar Public Library	Bolivar Public Library	July 17, 2003 (#03000652)	120 E. Jackson St. 37°36′48″N 93°24′37″W	Bolivar	
2	George Dimmitt Memorial Hospital	George Dimmitt Memorial Hospital	March 12, 2012 (#12000101)	102 S. Bolivar Rd. 37°47′41″N 93°34′34″W	Humansville	
3	First National Bank	First National Bank	October 16, 2013 (#13000839)	103 E. Broadway; 37°36′51″N 93°24′42″W	Bolivar	
4	North Ward School	North Ward School	July 14, 2011 (#11000442)	201 W. Locust St. 37°36′57″N 93°24′49″W	Bolivar	

== Putnam County ==
	Name on the Register	Image	Date listed	Location	City or town	Description
1	Unionville Square Historic District	Unionville Square Historic District	July 19, 2002 (#02000793)	Roughly along portions of Main, Grant., 16th and 17th Sts. 40°28′36″N 93°00′08″W	Unionville	

== Randolph County ==
	Name on the Register	Image	Date listed	Location	City or town	Description
1	Burkholder-O'Keefe House	Burkholder-O'Keefe House	September 25, 1989 (#89001414)	605 S. Fifth St. 39°24′47″N 92°26′31″W	Moberly	
2	Commerce Bank		February 7, 2022 (#100007420)	208 West Reed St. 39°25′11″N 92°26′18″W	Moberly	
3	Mitchell Petroglyph Archeological Site		June 23, 1969 (#69000124)	Hillside 0.5 miles (0.80 km) north of Thunderbird Lake; 39°32′59″N 92°20′06″W	Cairo	
4	Moberly Commercial Historic District	Moberly Commercial Historic District	September 4, 2012 (#12000592)	Roughly bounded by W. Coates, W. Rollins, N. Clark, & Johnson Sts. 39°25′11″N 92°26′27″W	Moberly	
5	Moberly Junior High School	Moberly Junior High School	January 4, 2008 (#07001340)	101 N. Johnson St. 39°25′09″N 92°26′37″W	Moberly	
6	Moberly Municipal Auditorium		January 20, 2022 (#100007361)	201-299 West Rollins St. 39°25′08″N 92°26′18″W	Moberly	

== Reynolds County ==
	Name on the Register	Image	Date listed	Location	City or town	Description
1	Buford-Carty Farmstead		June 16, 2004 (#04000603)	0.75 miles south of Highway J on County Road 814; 37°31′11″N 90°56′11″W	Black	
2	Civil War Fortification at Barnesville		July 1, 1998 (#98000817)	Deer Run State Forest; 37°13′10″N 90°59′14″W	Ellington	

== St. Clair County ==
	Name on the Register	Image	Date listed	Location	City or town	Description
1	Appleton City Downtown Commercial District		June 17, 2019 (#100004061)	100-200 e. 4th St., 100-131 W. 4th St., 201-306 N. Walnut St. 38°11′26″N 94°01′41″W	Appleton City	
2	Harper School		July 24, 2007 (#07000751)	Junction of Missouri Routes 82 and U 38°03′47″N 93°31′04″W	Harper	
3	Osceola Public School Building		January 21, 1999 (#98001638)	Junction of Fifth and Pine Sts. 38°02′41″N 93°42′03″W	Osceola	

== Schuyler County ==
	Name on the Register	Image	Date listed	Location	City or town	Description
1	Downing Railroad Depot	Downing Railroad Depot	March 29, 1983 (#83001037)	City Park; 40°28′59″N 92°22′08″W	Downing	
2	William P. Hall House	William P. Hall House	April 1, 1975 (#75001073)	U.S. Route 136, west of the Schuyler County Courthouse; 40°31′25″N 92°31′45″W	Lancaster	

== Scotland County ==
	Name on the Register	Image	Date listed	Location	City or town	Description
1	Bible Grove Consolidated District No. 5 School		May 5, 2000 (#00000441)	Southern side of Route T at Bible Grove; 40°21′04″N 92°18′08″W	Bible Grove	
2	Downing House	Downing House	June 27, 1979 (#79001396)	311 S. Main St. 40°27′22″N 92°10′15″W	Memphis	
3	Rutledge School		January 31, 2017 (#100000608)	142 2nd St. 40°18′58″N 92°05′15″W	Rutledge	

== Shelby County ==
	Name on the Register	Image	Date listed	Location	City or town	Description
1	Benjamin House	Benjamin House	June 27, 1972 (#72000732)	322 S. Shelby St. 39°41′23″N 92°02′47″W	Shelbina	
2	Bethel Historic District	Bethel Historic District	November 10, 1970 (#70000350)	Roughly bounded by Liberty, King, 1st, and 4th Sts. 39°52′42″N 92°01′24″W	Bethel	
3	Elim	Elim	May 27, 1971 (#71000477)	1.5 miles east of Bethel; 39°52′10″N 92°00′10″W	Bethel	
4	Hebron		January 31, 1978 (#78001677)	0.8 miles (1.3 km) northwest of Bethel; 39°53′23″N 92°01′46″W	Bethel	

== Stoddard County ==
	Name on the Register	Image	Date listed	Location	City or town	Description
1	Dexter Gymnasium	Dexter Gymnasium	August 8, 2001 (#01000839)	Junction of Park Lane and Fannetta St. 36°47′25″N 89°57′50″W	Dexter	
2	Henry Miller House		May 18, 2018 (#100002430)	106 Cape Rd. 36°53′24″N 89°55′29″W	Bloomfield	
3	Mingo National Wildlife Refuge Archeology District		May 12, 1975 (#75001074)	Address Restricted	Puxico	
4	Rich Wood Archeological Site		January 25, 1971 (#71000478)	7 miles (11 km) south of Dexter on the old road to Malden; 36°42′24″N 89°57′36″W	Bernie	
5	Stoddard County Courthouse	Stoddard County Courthouse	September 18, 1984 (#84002718)	Prairie and Court Sts. 36°53′04″N 89°55′45″W	Bloomfield	

== Stone County ==
	Name on the Register	Image	Date listed	Location	City or town	Description
1	Levi Morrill Post		April 3, 1979 (#79001397)	Southeast of Reeds Spring; 36°40′32″N 93°20′13″W	Notch	
2	Southwest Missouri Prehistoric Rock Shelter and Cave Sites Discontiguous Archeological District		October 24, 1991 (#91002046)	Section 34, Township 26 North, Range 23 West; 36°55′02″N 93°26′54″W	Elsey	Location is that of Hay Cave (23SN1), a part of the district
3	Stone County Courthouse	Stone County Courthouse	November 14, 1980 (#80002396)	Public Sq. 36°48′17″N 93°27′58″W	Galena	
4	Y Bridge	Y Bridge	May 23, 1991 (#91000591)	Junction of Routes 13 and 43 across the James River; 36°48′18″N 93°27′41″W	Galena	

== Wayne County ==
	Name on the Register	Image	Date listed	Location	City or town	Description
1	Fort Benton		October 21, 2002 (#02000212)	3.5 miles south of the junction of Routes 34 and 67; 37°11′02″N 90°33′14″W	Patterson	
2	Old Greenville (23WE637)	Old Greenville (23WE637)	February 17, 1990 (#90000005)	2 miles (3.2 km) south of Greenville off U.S. Route 67; 37°06′03″N 90°27′17″W	Greenville	
3	Sam A. Baker State Park Historic District	Sam A. Baker State Park Historic District	February 27, 1985 (#85000540)	St. Francis Mountains bounded roughly around Cedar Creek, Big Creek and Mudlick Canyon off Route 143; 37°15′32″N 90°31′34″W	Patterson	All or part of Sam A. Baker State Park

== Webster County ==
	Name on the Register	Image	Date listed	Location	City or town	Description
1	Hosmer Dairy Farm Historic District		May 16, 1996 (#96000549)	County Farm Road 522, approximately 0.5 miles southwest of its junction with Route E 37°21′33″N 93°01′40″W	Marshfield	
2	Col. Thomas C. Love House	Col. Thomas C. Love House	January 18, 1985 (#85000108)	Off Route 1; 37°11′20″N 92°43′48″W	Seymour	
3	Rainey Funeral Home Building	Rainey Funeral Home Building	January 22, 2014 (#13001112)	242 E. Washington St. 37°20′18″N 92°54′17″W	Marshfield	

== Worth County ==
	Name on the Register	Image	Date listed	Location	City or town	Description
1	Worth County Courthouse	Worth County Courthouse	January 20, 1983 (#83001056)	Public Sq. 40°29′10″N 94°24′32″W	Grant City	

== See also ==
- Historic houses in Missouri
- List of bridges on the National Register of Historic Places in Missouri
- List of National Historic Landmarks in Missouri
