= National Register of Historic Places listings in Ralls County, Missouri =

Location of Ralls County in Missouri

This is a list of the National Register of Historic Places listings in Ralls County, Missouri.

This is intended to be a complete list of the properties and districts on the National Register of Historic Places in Ralls County, Missouri, United States. Latitude and longitude coordinates are provided for many National Register properties and districts; these locations may be seen together in a map.

There are 9 properties and districts listed on the National Register in the county.

This National Park Service list is complete through NPS recent listings posted March 14, 2025.

== Current listings ==
	Name on the Register	Image	Date listed	Location	City or town	Description
1	James B. Brown House		January 26, 1984 (#84002603)	2400 Carrs Lane; 39°40′10″N 91°22′50″W	Hannibal	
2	John Garth House	John Garth House	July 11, 1977 (#77000813)	South of Hannibal off U.S. Route 61; 39°40′10″N 91°24′33″W	Hannibal	Garth Woodside Mansion Bed and Breakfast Inn, built 1871
3	Greenlawn Methodist Church and Cemetery		June 21, 2007 (#07000569)	Junction of Route J and County Road D 39°28′47″N 91°41′10″W	Perry	
4	Ilasco Historic District	Ilasco Historic District	June 7, 2016 (#16000343)	10998 Ilasco Trail; 39°40′16″N 91°18′34″W	Ilasco	
5	Lock and Dam No. 22 Historic District	Lock and Dam No. 22 Historic District	March 10, 2004 (#04000182)	Secondary Road E 39°38′13″N 91°14′52″W	New London	Extends into Pike County, Illinois
6	Ralls County Courthouse and Jail-Sheriff's House	Ralls County Courthouse and Jail-Sheriff's House	September 14, 1972 (#72000728)	Courthouse Sq. 39°35′09″N 91°24′01″W	New London	
7	St. Paul Catholic Church	St. Paul Catholic Church	May 31, 1979 (#79001392)	West of Center off Route EE; 39°30′12″N 91°36′21″W	Center	
8	St. Peter's Catholic Church	St. Peter's Catholic Church	November 14, 1980 (#80002392)	Southwest of Rensselaer on Route 2; 39°37′11″N 91°36′14″W	Rensselaer	1862 church on the site where Augustus Tolton, the first African American Catholic priest, was baptized.
9	Saverton School	Saverton School	December 10, 1998 (#98001505)	Junction of County Roads N and E 39°38′33″N 91°15′58″W	Saverton	

== See also ==
- List of National Historic Landmarks in Missouri
- National Register of Historic Places listings in Missouri
