= National Register of Historic Places listings in Cass County, Missouri =

Location of Cass County in Missouri

Cass County, Missouri, United States, has seven properties and districts located on the National Register of Historic Places.

Latitude and longitude coordinates are provided for many National Register properties and districts; these locations may be seen together in a map.

This National Park Service list is complete through NPS recent listings posted August 28, 2026.

== Current listings ==
	Name on the Register	Image	Date listed	Location	City or town	Description
1	Robert A. Brown House		June 15, 1970 (#70000327)	North of Harrisonville off Alternate U.S. Route 71; 38°41′03″N 94°23′14″W	Harrisonville	
2	Harrisonville Courthouse Square Historic District	Harrisonville Courthouse Square Historic District	April 8, 1994 (#94000315)	Roughly Courthouse Sq. and adjacent side streets 38°39′16″N 94°20′55″W	Harrisonville	
3	O'Bannon Homestead		July 3, 1979 (#79001356)	Northeast of Garden City off Route NN; 38°34′24″N 94°09′25″W	Garden City	
4	Pleasant Hill Downtown Historic District		March 23, 2005 (#04000781)	Approximately bounded by the 200 block of Cedar St., the 100 block of Lake St., 100-115 Wyoming St., and 101-204 1st St. 38°47′17″N 94°16′25″W	Pleasant Hill	
5	St. Peter's Episcopal Church		September 9, 1982 (#82003132)	400 W. Wall St. 38°39′16″N 94°21′04″W	Harrisonville	
6	Stumbaugh Post No. 180 GAR Hall		June 8, 2000 (#00000694)	Route T 38°30′12″N 94°17′59″W	Austin	Demolished
7	Watkins Family Farm Historic District		May 2, 2007 (#07000376)	19116 S. School Rd. 38°46′32″N 94°27′36″W	Raymore	

== See also ==
- List of National Historic Landmarks in Missouri
- National Register of Historic Places listings in Missouri
