= National Register of Historic Places listings in Ray County, Missouri =

Location of Ray County in Missouri

This is a list of the National Register of Historic Places listings in Ray County, Missouri.

This is intended to be a complete list of the properties and districts on the National Register of Historic Places in Ray County, Missouri, United States. Latitude and longitude coordinates are provided for many National Register properties and districts; these locations may be seen together in a map.

There are 6 properties and districts listed on the National Register in the county.

This National Park Service list is complete through NPS recent listings posted March 14, 2025.

== Current listings ==
	Name on the Register	Image	Date listed	Location	City or town	Description
1	Dougherty Auditorium	Dougherty Auditorium	September 16, 1982 (#82003158)	203 W. Main St. 39°16′42″N 93°58′45″W	Richmond	
2	Isiah Mansur Farmstead Historic District	Isiah Mansur Farmstead Historic District	August 14, 1998 (#98001063)	17740 Highway E. 39°24′46″N 93°53′11″W	Richmond	
3	New Hope Primitive Baptist Church	New Hope Primitive Baptist Church	November 14, 1980 (#80002393)	Southwest of Richmond on Old Orrick Rd. 39°14′59″N 94°02′37″W	Richmond	
4	Ray County Courthouse	Ray County Courthouse	October 11, 1979 (#79001393)	Off Missouri Routes 10 and 13; 39°16′44″N 93°58′37″W	Richmond	
5	Ray County Poor Farm	Ray County Poor Farm	July 10, 1979 (#79001394)	W. Royale St. 39°16′22″N 93°59′20″W	Richmond	
6	Watkins House	Watkins House	February 10, 1983 (#83001036)	302 S. Camden St. 39°16′36″N 93°58′45″W	Richmond	Designed by architect George Franklin Barber

== See also ==
- List of National Historic Landmarks in Missouri
- National Register of Historic Places listings in Missouri
