= National Register of Historic Places listings in Taney County, Missouri =

Location of Taney County in Missouri

This is a list of the National Register of Historic Places listings in Taney County, Missouri.

This is intended to be a complete list of the properties and districts on the National Register of Historic Places in Taney County, Missouri, United States. Latitude and longitude coordinates are provided for many National Register properties and districts; these locations may be seen together in a map.

There are 5 properties and districts listed on the National Register in the county. Another 2 properties were once listed but have been removed.

This National Park Service list is complete through NPS recent listings posted March 14, 2025.

== Current listings ==
	Name on the Register	Image	Date listed	Location	City or town	Description
1	Bonniebrook Homestead		May 29, 1997 (#84002720)	U.S. Route 65; 36°46′24″N 93°13′11″W	Walnut Shade	
2	Branson City Park Historic District		August 31, 1993 (#93000874)	Junction of St. Limas and Oklahoma Sts. 36°38′45″N 93°12′50″W	Branson	This place no longer exists as it was replaced with The Branson Landing
3	Downing Street Historic District	Downing Street Historic District	December 29, 1978 (#78001678)	Downing St. between 3rd and 4th Sts. 36°37′23″N 93°12′56″W	Hollister	
4	Samuel T. and Mary B. Parnell House		April 25, 2008 (#08000333)	220 Angels Trail; 36°38′31″N 93°12′37″W	Branson	
5	John Ross House		July 21, 1983 (#83001054)	Route 76; 36°38′58″N 93°18′30″W	Branson	"Old Matt's Cabin" now sits at the Shepherd of the Hills farm off Route 76, just west of Branson

== Former listings ==
	Name on the Register	Image	Date listed	Date removed	Location	City or town	Description
1	Sammy Lane Resort Historic District		August 31, 1993 (#93000875)	April 25, 2003	320 E. Main St. 36°38′39″N 93°12′56″W	Branson	Demolished in 2003 for the construction of Branson Landing.
2	Swan Creek Bridge		September 8, 1983 (#83001055)	December 19, 1994	North of Forsyth	Branson	Destroyed in 1989.

== See also ==
- List of National Historic Landmarks in Missouri
- National Register of Historic Places listings in Missouri
