= National Register of Historic Places listings in Pulaski County, Missouri =

Location of Pulaski County in Missouri

This is a list of the National Register of Historic Places listings in Pulaski County, Missouri.

This is intended to be a complete list of the properties and districts on the National Register of Historic Places in Pulaski County, Missouri, United States. Latitude and longitude coordinates are provided for many National Register properties and districts; these locations may be seen together in a map.

There are 7 properties and districts listed on the National Register in the county.

This National Park Service list is complete through NPS recent listings posted April 24, 2026.

== Current listings ==
	Name on the Register	Image	Date listed	Location	City or town	Description
1	Decker Cave Archeological Site		February 12, 1971 (#71000473)	Address Restricted	Buckhorn	
2	Calloway Manes Homestead	Calloway Manes Homestead	June 6, 1980 (#80002390)	Northwest of Richland; 37°52′54″N 92°23′49″W	Richland	
3	Devil's Elbow Historic District	Devil's Elbow Historic District	April 17, 2017 (#100000566)	12175, 12177, 12198 Timber Rd., 21050, 21104, 21141, 21150 Teardrop Rd. 37°50′47″N 92°03′43″W	Devil's Elbow	
4	Old Stagecoach Stop	Old Stagecoach Stop	November 24, 1980 (#80002391)	Linn St., Courthouse Sq. 37°49′46″N 92°12′00″W	Waynesville	
5	Onyx Cave		May 21, 1999 (#99000529)	14705 Private Drive 8541; 37°53′08″N 92°01′47″W	Newburg	
6	Piney Beach		April 17, 2017 (#100000567)	1280 Tank Ln. 37°50′59″N 92°04′23″W	Hooker	
7	Pulaski County Courthouse	Pulaski County Courthouse	July 17, 1979 (#79001391)	Courthouse Sq. 37°49′45″N 92°12′04″W	Waynesville	

== See also ==
- List of National Historic Landmarks in Missouri
- National Register of Historic Places listings in Missouri
