= Bible (disambiguation) =

The Bible is a canonical collection of texts treated as religious scripture in Judaism, Christianity, Islam and other religions.

Bible or The Bible may also refer to:

== Film and television ==
- The Bible: In the Beginning..., a 1966 Italian-American religious epic film
- Wakefield Poole's Bible, or simply Bible!, a 1973 American softcore pornographic film
- The Bible (TV series), a 2013 American religious television miniseries
- The American Bible Challenge, a 2012 American religious game show
- "Bible", a Series B episode of the television series QI (2004)

== Literature ==
- Any book or written work that is considered authoritative in its field, e.g., the 1978 programming book The C Programming Language is often referred to as "the bible of C programming"
- Bible (screenwriting), a reference document for screenwriters to ensure consistency within an ongoing television production
- Rubber Bible, an informal name for the 1914 reference book CRC Handbook of Chemistry and Physics
- Doom Bible, an original design document written by Tom Hall for 1993 game Doom

== Music ==
- The Bible (band), a 20th- and 21st-century English rock band known for their songs "Graceland" and "Mahalia"
- The Bible (album), a 2022 album by Lambchop

== People ==
- Alan Bible (1909–1988), an American politician
- Bible John, unidentified British serial killer
- Dana Bible (born 1953), American football coach
- Dana X. Bible (1891–1980), an American athlete, coach, and administrator
- Lee Bible (1887–1929), a race-car driver notable for land-speed record attempt

== Other ==
- Another name for the omasum, the third compartment of the stomach in ruminants
- Bible Hill, Nova Scotia, a village in Colchester County, Nova Scotia, Canada
- Bible Grove (disambiguation), multiple towns in the United States
- The part of a pin tumbler lock which holds the driver pins (see Glossary of locksmithing terms)

== See also ==
- Bibleman, American Christian direct-to-video children's series (1995–2010)
- Hebrew Bible (disambiguation)
- Scripture (disambiguation)
- The Holy Bible (disambiguation)
