= Bible Grove =

Bible Grove may refer to the following places in the United States:

- Bible Grove, Illinois
- Bible Grove Township, Clay County, Illinois
- Bible Grove, Missouri
  - Bible Grove Consolidated District No. 5 School
