= Harper High School =

Harper High School may refer to:

- Harper High School (Chicago, Illinois), Chicago, Illinois
- Harper School (Oregon), a K-12 school in Harper, Oregon
- Harper High School (Texas), Harper Texas

== See also ==
- Harper School (disambiguation)
