= Harper School =

Harper School may refer to:

- Harper School (Harper, Missouri), a former school building on the National Register of Historic Places in Harper, Missouri
- Harper School (Oregon), a K-12 school in Harper, Oregon
