= Community Theatre =

Community Theatre or Community Theater may refer to:

- Community theatre, the putting on of generally amateur theatre productions

In the United States

- Community Theatre (Pine Bluff, Arkansas), listed on the National Register of Historic Places (NRHP) in Arkansas
- Community Theater (Newburg, Missouri), listed on the NRHP in Missouri
- Community Theatre (Kingston, New York), listed on the NRHP in Ulster County, New York

== See also ==
- Former name of Marian Street Theatre in Sydney, Australia
