= National Register of Historic Places listings in Camden County, Missouri =

Location of Camden County in Missouri

This is a list of the National Register of Historic Places listings in Camden County, Missouri.

This is intended to be a complete list of the properties and districts on the National Register of Historic Places in Camden County, Missouri, United States. Latitude and longitude coordinates are provided for many National Register properties and districts; these locations may be seen together in a map.

There are 10 properties and districts listed on the National Register in the county.

This National Park Service list is complete through NPS recent listings posted March 14, 2025.

== Current listings ==
| | Name on the Register | Image | Date listed | Location | City or town | Description |
|---|---|---|---|---|---|---|
| 1 | Camp Hawthorne Central Area District | | February 28, 1985 (#85000526) | Northeast of Camdenton in Lake of the Ozarks State Park; 38°06′54″N 92°38′36″W | Camdenton | |
| 2 | Camp Pin Oak Historic District | | June 27, 1985 (#85001477) | Northeast of Camdenton in Lake of the Ozarks State Park; 38°07′01″N 92°37′27″W | Camdenton | |
| 3 | Lake of the Ozarks Recreational Demonstration Area Barn/Garage in Kaiser Area | | February 28, 1985 (#85000523) | Northeast of Camdenton in Lake of the Ozarks State Park; 38°06′37″N 92°36′12″W | Camdenton | |
| 4 | Lake of the Ozarks Recreational Demonstration Area Rising Sun Shelter | | February 26, 1985 (#85000524) | Northeast of Camdenton in Lake of the Ozarks State Park; 38°06′04″N 92°37′10″W | Camdenton | |
| 5 | Lake of the Ozarks Recreational Demonstration Area Shelter at McCubbin Point | | February 26, 1985 (#85000525) | Northeast of Camdenton in Lake of the Ozarks State Park; 38°05′51″N 92°36′33″W | Camdenton | |
| 6 | Lake of the Ozarks State Park Camp Clover Point Recreation Hall | | March 4, 1985 (#85000502) | Northeast of Camdenton in Lake of the Ozarks State Park; 38°06′24″N 92°38′25″W | Camdenton | |
| 7 | Lake of the Ozarks State Park Camp Rising Sun Recreation Hall | | March 4, 1985 (#85000503) | Northeast of Camdenton in Lake of the Ozarks State Park; 38°06′23″N 92°37′38″W | Camdenton | |
| 8 | Lake of the Ozarks State Park Highway 134 Historic District | Lake of the Ozarks State Park Highway 134 Historic District | February 26, 1985 (#85000533) | West of Brumley along Route 134; 38°06′37″N 92°34′00″W | Brumley | Extends into Miller County |
| 9 | Pin Oak Hollow Bridge | | September 13, 1985 (#85002737) | Lake of the Ozarks State Park; 38°06′50″N 92°36′43″W | Pin Oak Hollow | |
| 10 | Urbauer Fishing Lodge Historic District | | November 8, 2006 (#06000989) | 442 Riverbird Ln. 37°57′45″N 92°50′05″W | Camdenton | |

== See also ==
- List of National Historic Landmarks in Missouri
- National Register of Historic Places listings in Missouri
