= Newburg, Missouri =

City in Phelps County, Missouri, United States

- City
- Location of Newburg, Missouri
- Coordinates: 37°54′58″N 91°54′02″W
- Country: United States
- State: Missouri
- County: Phelps

Area
  - Total: 0.65 sq mi (1.69 km^{2})
  - Land: 0.64 sq mi (1.67 km^{2})
  - Water: 0.0077 sq mi (0.02 km^{2})
- Elevation: 728 ft (222 m)

Population (2020)
  - Total: 333
  - Density: 516.4/sq mi (199.38/km^{2})
- Time zone: UTC-6 (Central (CST))
  - Summer (DST): UTC-5 (CDT)
- ZIP code: 65550
- Area code: 573
- FIPS code: 29-51716
- GNIS feature ID: 2395222

Newburg is a city in Phelps County, Missouri, United States. As of the 2020 census, Newburg had a population of 333.

== History ==
Newburg was founded in 1883 by St. Louis – San Francisco Railway as a division point for the railroad, where engines would stop for repairs and to change crews. It is currently used heavily by the Burlington Northern Santa Fe Railroad as a maintenance stop, with a large supply of railroad materials along the double tracks.

Iron working was attempted twice in Newburg. Easy access to the railroad made heavy industry a viable business. Construction of the Ozark Iron Works began after 1867, but the business went bankrupt in 1877. The Knotwell Iron Company attempted to use the facilities in 1880, but quit shortly afterwards due to a severe drop in iron prices.

After World War II, the railway switched from coal to diesel engines, which could run much longer distances without refueling. The Newburg stop was closed in the 1960’s, removing the roundhouse, turntable, and freight yards. A single "Frisco" caboose remains near the old freight yards.

Missouri University of Science and Technology in nearby Rolla has planned and implemented many projects in the city of Newburg.

The Community Theater, Gourd Creek Cave Archeological Site, Onyx Cave, and Ozark Iron Furnace Stack are listed on the National Register of Historic Places.

== Geography ==
Newburg is located on the north bank of the Little Piney Creek floodplain. The St. Louis–San Francisco Railway passes through the south edge of the city.

According to the United States Census Bureau, the city has a total area of 0.62 square miles (1.61 km^{2}), of which 0.61 square miles (1.58 km^{2}) is land and 0.01 square miles (0.03 km^{2}) is water.

Newburg is situated near the former U.S. Route 66 on State Hwy T. A handful of structures which served tourism on Route 66 before it was bypassed by Interstate 44 some business structures still remain, including The Houston House, John's Modern Cabins (a ghost tourist court, now in ruins) and Vernelle's Motel (still operational, except for an on-site restaurant and filling station demolished when US 66 was widened in 1957).

=== Climate ===
Newburg lies in a transitional zone between warm continental and humid subtropical climates.

Climate data for Newburg
Month	Jan	Feb	Mar	Apr	May	Jun	Jul	Aug	Sep	Oct	Nov	Dec	Year
Mean daily maximum °F (°C)	40 (4)	46 (8)	56 (13)	67 (19)	75 (24)	84 (29)	89 (32)	88 (31)	80 (27)	69 (21)	56 (13)	43 (6)	66 (19)
Mean daily minimum °F (°C)	21 (−6)	25 (−4)	34 (1)	44 (7)	55 (13)	64 (18)	68 (20)	67 (19)	57 (14)	46 (8)	36 (2)	25 (−4)	45 (7)
Average precipitation inches (mm)	1.69 (43)	1.93 (49)	3.51 (89)	3.90 (99)	4.44 (113)	3.65 (93)	3.90 (99)	3.67 (93)	3.48 (88)	3.26 (83)	4.10 (104)	2.88 (73)	40.41 (1,026)

== Demographics ==
Historical population
Census	Pop.	Note	%±
1890	568		—
1900	481		−15.3%
1910	932		93.8%
1920	1,235		32.5%
1930	1,036		−16.1%
1940	1,056		1.9%
1950	949		−10.1%
1960	884		−6.8%
1970	806		−8.8%
1980	743		−7.8%
1990	589		−20.7%
2000	484		−17.8%
2010	470		−2.9%
2020	333		−29.1%
U.S. Decennial Census

=== 2010 census ===
As of the census of 2010, there were 470 people, 197 households, and 120 families living in the city. The population density was 770.5 inhabitants per square mile (297.5/km^{2}). There were 271 housing units at an average density of 444.3 per square mile (171.5/km^{2}). The racial makeup of the city was 98.72% White, 0.21% Native American, 0.21% Asian, and 0.85% from two or more races. Hispanic or Latino of any race were 1.06% of the population.

There were 197 households, of which 28.9% had children under the age of 18 living with them, 38.6% were married couples living together, 14.7% had a female householder with no husband present, 7.6% had a male householder with no wife present, and 39.1% were non-families. 33.0% of all households were made up of individuals, and 18.8% had someone living alone who was 65 years of age or older. The average household size was 2.39 and the average family size was 3.00.

The median age in the city was 38 years. 24.5% of residents were under the age of 18; 8.6% were between the ages of 18 and 24; 23.1% were from 25 to 44; 26.1% were from 45 to 64; and 17.7% were 65 years of age or older. The gender makeup of the city was 48.3% male and 51.7% female.

=== 2000 census ===
As of the census of 2000, there were 484 people, 218 households, and 129 families living in the city. The population density was 784.9 inhabitants per square mile (303.1/km^{2}). There were 256 housing units at an average density of 415.1 per square mile (160.3/km^{2}). The racial makeup of the city was 96.90% White, 0.41% Native American, 0.41% Asian, 0.41% from other races, and 1.86% from two or more races. Hispanic or Latino of any race were 0.62% of the population.

There were 218 households, out of which 27.1% had children under the age of 18 living with them, 41.7% were married couples living together, 13.3% had a female householder with no husband present, and 40.4% were non-families. 34.4% of all households were made up of individuals, and 17.0% had someone living alone who was 65 years of age or older. The average household size was 2.22 and the average family size was 2.88.

In the city the population was spread out, with 22.7% under the age of 18, 10.3% from 18 to 24, 28.3% from 25 to 44, 21.7% from 45 to 64, and 16.9% who were 65 years of age or older. The median age was 40 years. For every 100 females there were 93.6 males. For every 100 females age 18 and over, there were 91.8 males.

The median income for a household in the city was $18,000, and the median income for a family was $21,667. Males had a median income of $28,000 versus $18,333 for females. The per capita income for the city was $11,092. About 23.4% of families and 29.7% of the population were below the poverty line, including 51.2% of those under age 18 and 17.5% of those age 65 or over.

== See also ==
- List of cities in Missouri
- National Register of Historic Places listings in Phelps County, Missouri
  - Community Theater (Newburg, Missouri)
  - Ozark Iron Furnace Stack
