= Ozark Iron Furnace Stack =

- U.S. National Register of Historic Places
- Location within Missouri Location within the United States
- Location: 2 miles W of Newburg, near Newburg, Missouri
- Coordinates: 37°54′56″N 91°55′52″W
- Area: 14.3 acres (5.8 ha)
- Built: 1873
- Built by: Allison, J.W.
- NRHP reference No.: 70000345
- Added to NRHP: June 15, 1970

Ozark Iron Furnace Stack, also known as the Ozark Iron Works, is a historic iron furnace located near Newburg, Phelps County, Missouri. It was built in 1873, and is a pyramidal shaped furnace stack constructed of hard, compact, fine-drained sandstone blocks on a solid rock foundation. It measures approximately 40 feet in height. The furnace was in operation until 1884. The furnace is located mostly on private property and may not be visible from public right-of-way.

It was listed on the National Register of Historic Places in 1970.
