= Jean-Pierre Isaac =

- Jean-Pierre Isaac, 2006

Background information
- Born: 5 January 1956 (age 70); Belgium
- Origin: Quebec
- Died: Montreal
- Occupations: Lyricist; composer; programmer; DJ; music producer

Jean-Pierre Isaac (5 January 1956 - 28 February 2024) emigrated to Quebec from Belgium in 1961. Jean-Pierre Isaac was a bilingual lyricist, composer, programmer, DJ, recording studio owner (located in Montreal's Le Plateau-Mont-Royal borough) and a music producer. His contributions to music and his national and international success earned him many awards.

== Profile ==
Jean-Pierre Isaac has written and/or produced music for many artists, notably the French Gilbert Montagné, Quebec's Mitsou, Les BB, Celine Dion, Cindy Daniel, Marie Carmen, Mario Pelchat, Judith Berard, Scripture (his solo project featured on "Cafe del Mar", and released album No Word Needed), and many more. He was also the composer and producer of many TV-themes and radio-TV commercial spots.

== Awards ==
- 7 platinum, double platinum and triple platinum albums.
- 9 gold albums.
- 6 Félix awards.
- 2 3M Visionary awards.
- 2 Socan awards.
- 1 Talcan award.
