= National Register of Historic Places listings in Lincoln County, Missouri =

Location of Lincoln County in Missouri

This is a list of the National Register of Historic Places listings in Lincoln County, Missouri.

This is intended to be a complete list of the properties and districts on the National Register of Historic Places in Lincoln County, Missouri, United States. Latitude and longitude coordinates are provided for many National Register properties and districts; these locations may be seen together in a map.

There are 5 properties and districts listed on the National Register in the county.

This National Park Service list is complete through NPS recent listings posted March 14, 2025.

== Current listings ==
	Name on the Register	Image	Date listed	Location	City or town	Description
1	Camp Sherwood Forest Historic District		March 4, 1985 (#85000512)	Southwest of Troy in Cuivre State Park; 39°02′35″N 90°54′57″W	Troy	
2	Cuivre River State Park Administrative Area Historic District		March 4, 1985 (#85000514)	Southwest of Troy in Cuivre State Park; 39°00′22″N 90°55′36″W	Troy	Administrative area within Cuivre River State Park
3	Downtown Troy Historic District	Downtown Troy Historic District	October 30, 2013 (#13000857)	Bounded by Annie Ave., 2nd, Marble & Court Sts. 38°58′45″N 90°58′52″W	Troy	
4	Lock and Dam No. 25 Historic District	Lock and Dam No. 25 Historic District	March 10, 2004 (#04000184)	10 Sandy Slough Rd. 39°00′16″N 90°41′26″W	Winfield	
5	Old Rock House	Old Rock House	October 18, 1972 (#72000721)	2nd and Mill Sts. 38°56′57″N 90°54′53″W	Moscow Mills	

== See also ==
- List of National Historic Landmarks in Missouri
- National Register of Historic Places listings in Missouri
