= Hebrew Bible (disambiguation) =

The Hebrew Bible is the canonical collection of Hebrew scriptures. It may also refer to:

- Hebrew Bible: A Critical Edition, an in-progress critical edition of the Hebrew Bible published by Oxford University Press
- The Hebrew Bible: A Translation with Commentary, a 2018 English translation of the Hebrew Bible by Robert Alter
- Bible translations into Hebrew

== See also ==
- Tanak (disambiguation)
- Bible (disambiguation)
