= Scripture (disambiguation) =

Scripture is that portion of literature deemed authoritative for establishing instructions within any of a number of specific religious traditions, especially the Abrahamic religions.

Scripture or Scriptures may also refer to:

- Religious education, in British schools
- Scripture: No Word Needed, by French Canadian composer Jean-Pierre Isaac
- People with surname Scripture:
  - Bill Scripture (1941–2018), American baseball player
  - Edward Wheeler Scripture (1864–1945), American physician and psychologist
- Scriptures (Benediction album)
- Scriptures (Tee Grizzley album)
- Scriptures (band), an instrumental collective from Seattle, Washington
- The Scriptures (album), an album by Christian Death
