= The Holy Bible (disambiguation) =

The Holy Bible is a collection of religious texts.

The Holy Bible may also refer to:

- The Holy Bible (album), a 1994 album by the band Manic Street Preachers
- The Holy Bible: A Purified Translation, a 2000 edition of the New Testament

== See also ==
- Bible (disambiguation)
