= Scripture: No Word Needed =

Studio album by Scripture, Jean-Pierre Isaac
- Released: July 1998
- Recorded: Numuz Studios, Montreal, Canada
- Genre: New-age
- Length: 51:23
- Label: Mercury/Polygram
- Producer: Jean-Pierre Isaac

Scripture, Jean-Pierre Isaac chronology
Scripture: No Word Needed (1998)	Scripture II (2008)

Released in 1998, Scripture: No Word Needed is the first album of a solo project called Scripture by French Canadian composer Jean-Pierre Isaac. It received a positive review from Canada's SEE Magazine. Track 10, "Words Needed", features a female singer named Cossy Stocola (mistakenly written Cussy in the album) sometimes also credited as Cossy Cee. Her full name is Costanza Stocola. Not much is known about this singer, other than that she is Italian, and resides in Montreal, Quebec, Canada. She was also part of the 90’s duo group BOYGIRL and house, trance and dance music singer in the 90’s.

== Track listing ==
1. "intro" - 2:07
2. "so!!!" - 5:21
3. "corn amused" - 5:01
4. "off era" - 4:38
5. "no word needed" - 3:56
6. "shine ease" - 4:03
7. "love song" - 4:57
8. "gama" - 4:18
9. "apache" - 4:49
10. "words needed" - 4:29
11. "crying hope" - 3:37
12. "escapes" - 3:52

"Corn Amused" is featured on the Mystera V compilation. Also, "Apache" is featured on the Cafe Del Mar, Volume 8 compilation.

== Personnel ==
- Cossy Stocola - Female voice on Words Needed
- Spectrasonics' Symphony of voices - Choir
- Spectrasonics' Liquid Grooves & Distorted Reality - Drum loops and Fxs on Words Needed
- Jean-Pierre Isaac - Male voices on Escapes, So!!!, Corn Amused, Gama, No Word Needed and Crying Hope
- Best Service Hallelujah - Female voices on Intro, So!!!, Corn Amused and Male choir on Intro and Apache
- Spectrasonics' Symphony of Voices - Female voices & Choirs on No Word Needed
- Spectrasonics' Liquid Grooves - Drum loops
- Ruggiero, Campopiano Records, Italy - Nylon Guitars on Apache

== Music videos ==
A music video of "Words Needed" has been released by Universal Music in 1999. 3 different versions exist, with 3 different endings. Also by Universal Music, a music video of "Corn Amused" has been filmed in May 1998.
