= Saverton School =

- U.S. National Register of Historic Places
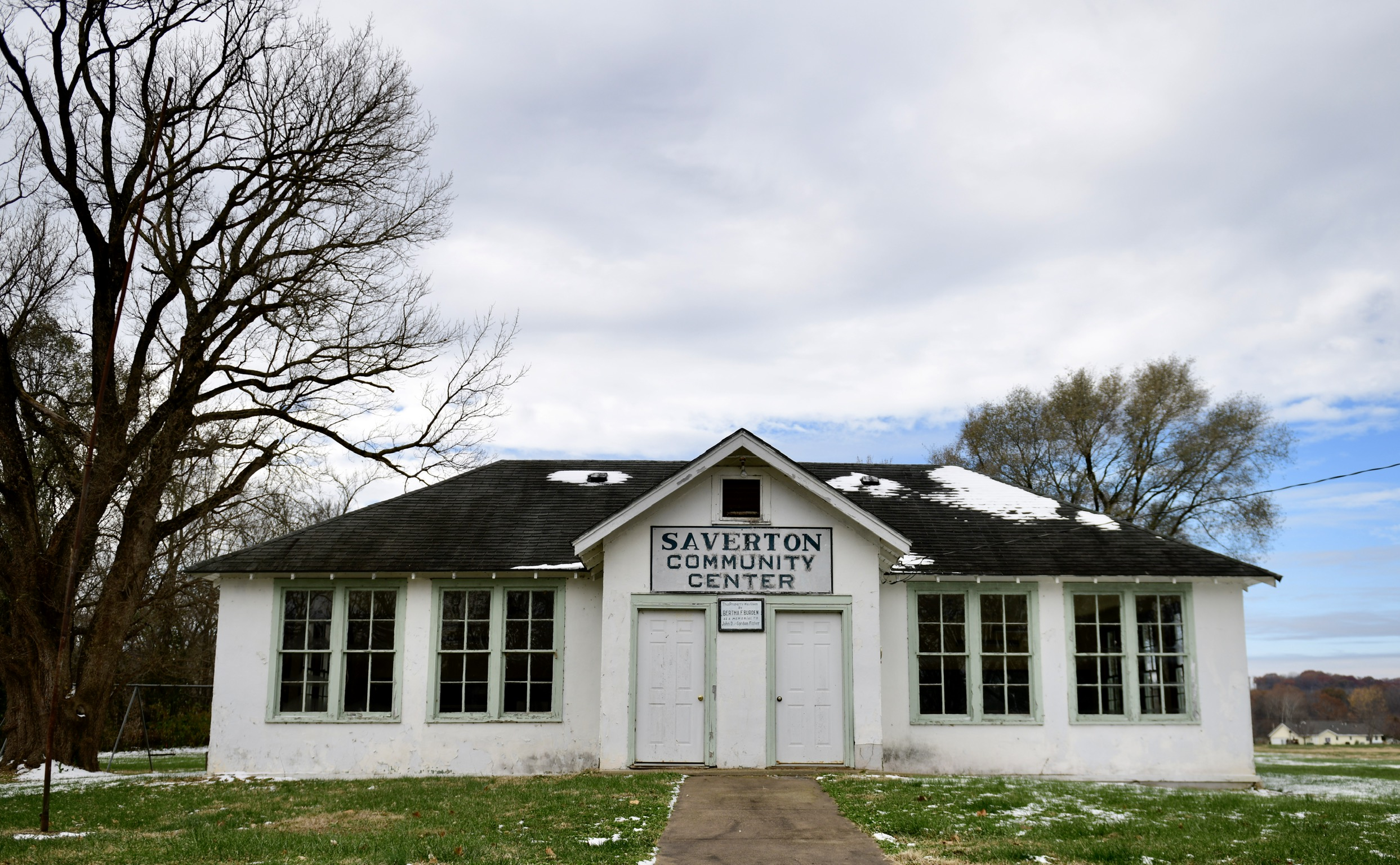

- Location within Missouri Location within the United States
- Location: Jct. of Cty. Rtes. N and E, Saverton, Missouri
- Coordinates: 39°38′33″N 91°15′58″W
- Area: 1 acre (0.40 ha)
- Built: 1934
- Built by: Lankford, John
- NRHP reference No.: 98001505
- Added to NRHP: December 10, 1998

Saverton School, also known as Saverton Community Center , is a historic school building located at Saverton, Ralls County, Missouri. It was built in 1934, and is a one-story hipped roof, frame building with two school rooms. It measures 52 feet by 24 feet, with a 52 feet by 13 feet addition constructed in 1960. The building has housed a community centre since 1959.

It was listed on the National Register of Historic Places in 1998.
