= Dougherty Auditorium =

- U.S. National Register of Historic Places
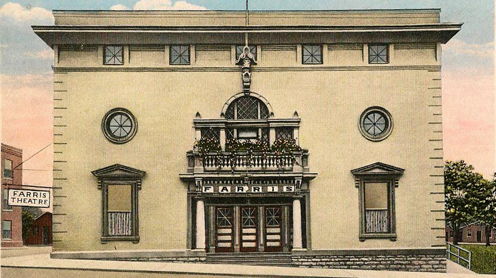
- Farris theater postcard image

- Location within Missouri Location within the United States
- Location: 203 W. Main St., Richmond, Missouri
- Coordinates: 39°16′42″N 93°58′45″W
- Area: less than one acre
- Built: 1900-1901
- Architect: Shepard & Farrar
- NRHP reference No.: 82003158
- Added to NRHP: September 16, 1982

Dougherty Auditorium, also known as Farris Theater, is a historic theatre located at Richmond, Ray County, Missouri. It was built in 1900–1901, and is a two-story, rectangular brick building measuring 60 feet by 100 feet. It features a Palladian window of sheet metal above the central entrance with flanking circular windows. It currently houses a local history museum.

It was added to the National Register of Historic Places in 1979.
