= Garden City, Missouri =

- City
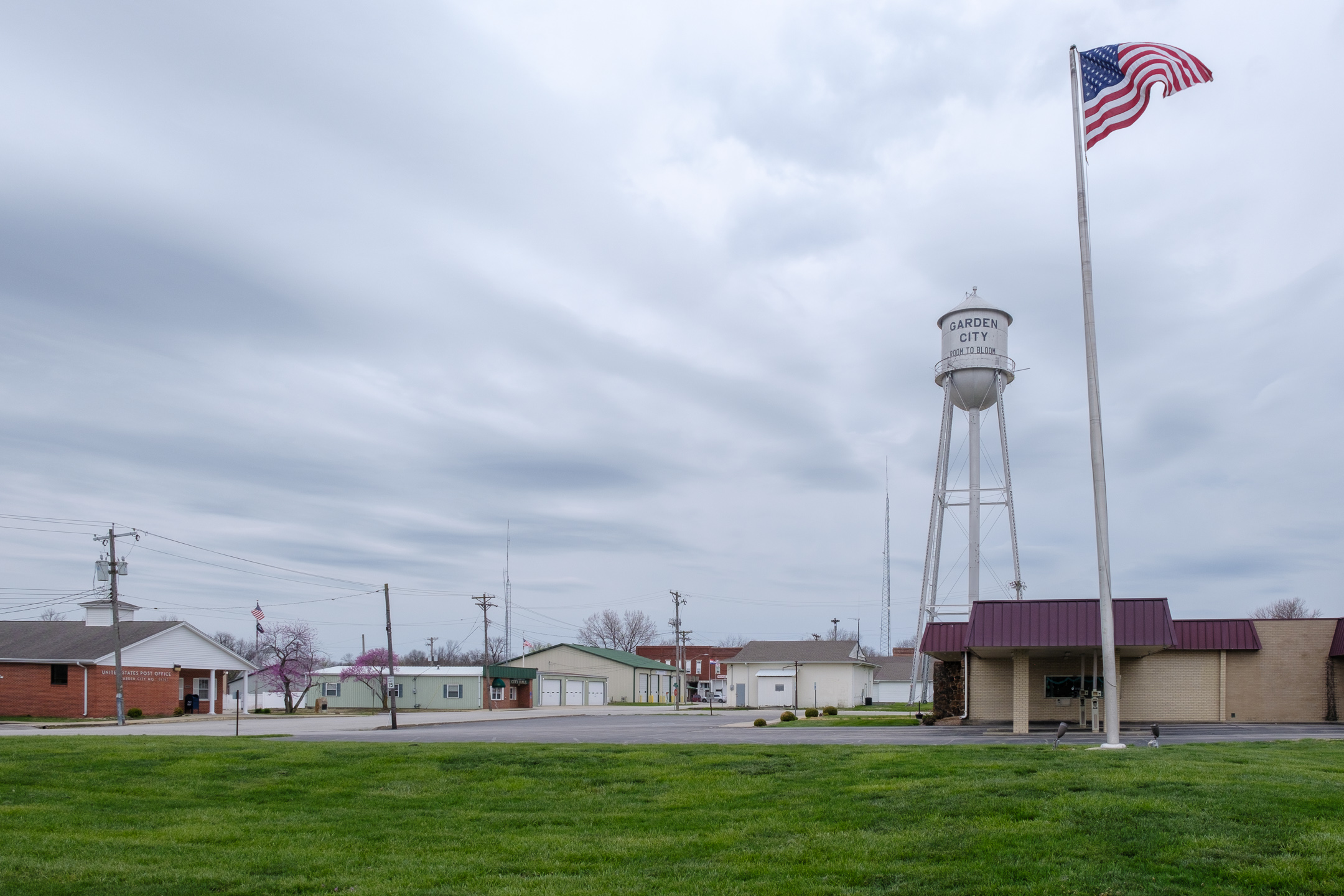
- Motto: A piece of heaven on highway seven.
- Location of Garden City, Missouri
- Coordinates: 38°33′47″N 94°11′45″W
- Country: United States
- State: Missouri
- County: Cass

Government
  - Type: [[Mayor-council government
  - Mayor: Shannon Leslie

Area
  - Total: 2.51 sq mi (6.50 km^{2})
  - Land: 2.47 sq mi (6.40 km^{2})
  - Water: 0.039 sq mi (0.10 km^{2})
- Elevation: 919 ft (280 m)

Population (2020)
  - Total: 1,629
  - Density: 658.9/sq mi (254.39/km^{2})
- Time zone: UTC-6 (Central (CST))
  - Summer (DST): UTC-5 (CDT)
- ZIP code: 64747
- Area codes: 816, 975
- FIPS code: 29-26434
- GNIS feature ID: 2394851
- Website: https://gardencitymo.org/

Garden City is a city in southeast Cass County, Missouri, United States. The population was 1,579 at the 2020 census. The city lies roughly 50 miles southeast the Kansas City metropolitan area.

== History ==
Garden City was platted in 1885, and so named on account of the fertile soil near the town site. A post office called Garden City has been in operation since 1875.

The O'Bannon Homestead was listed on the National Register of Historic Places in 1979.

== Geography ==
Garden City is located along Missouri Route 7. The headwaters of Panther Creek arise just southeast of the location.

According to the United States Census Bureau, the city has a total area of 2.51 square miles (6.50 km^{2}), of which 2.47 square miles (6.40 km^{2}) is land and 0.04 square miles (0.10 km^{2}) is water.

== Demographics ==
Historical population
Census	Pop.	Note	%±
1890	227		—
1900	574		152.9%
1910	713		24.2%
1920	711		−0.3%
1930	632		−11.1%
1940	599		−5.2%
1950	590		−1.5%
1960	600		1.7%
1970	633		5.5%
1980	1,021		61.3%
1990	1,225		20.0%
2000	1,500		22.4%
2010	1,642		9.5%
2020	1,629		−0.8%
U.S. Decennial Census

=== Racial and ethnic composition ===
Garden City city, Missouri – Racial and ethnic composition Note: the US Census treats Hispanic/Latino as an ethnic category. This table excludes Latinos from the racial categories and assigns them to a separate category. Hispanics/Latinos may be of any race.
Race / Ethnicity (NH = Non-Hispanic)	Pop 2000	Pop 2010	Pop 2020	% 2000	% 2010	% 2020
White alone (NH)	1,451	1,576	1,483	96.73%	95.98%	91.04%
Black or African American alone (NH)	3	3	1	0.20%	0.18%	0.06%
Native American or Alaska Native alone (NH)	7	15	6	0.47%	0.91%	0.37%
Asian alone (NH)	0	4	1	0.00%	0.24%	0.06%
Native Hawaiian or Pacific Islander alone (NH)	0	0	1	0.00%	0.00%	0.06%
Other race alone (NH)	0	2	2	0.00%	0.12%	0.12%
Mixed race or Multiracial (NH)	17	14	64	1.13%	0.85%	3.93%
Hispanic or Latino (any race)	22	28	71	1.47%	1.71%	4.36%
Total	1,500	1,642	1,629	100.00%	100.00%	100.00%

=== 2020 census ===
As of the 2020 census, Garden City had a population of 1,629. The median age was 34.5 years. 26.9% of residents were under the age of 18 and 12.8% were 65 years of age or older. For every 100 females there were 92.8 males, and for every 100 females age 18 and over there were 94.4 males age 18 and over.

0.0% of residents lived in urban areas, while 100.0% lived in rural areas.

There were 640 households, of which 35.6% had children under the age of 18 living in them. Of all households, 43.0% were married-couple households, 18.0% were households with a male householder and no spouse or partner present, and 28.9% were households with a female householder and no spouse or partner present. About 27.9% of all households were made up of individuals, and 10.0% had someone living alone who was 65 years of age or older.

There were 710 housing units, of which 9.9% were vacant. The homeowner vacancy rate was 5.0% and the rental vacancy rate was 8.1%.

Racial composition as of the 2020 census
Race	Number	Percent
White	1,514	92.9%
Black or African American	3	0.2%
American Indian and Alaska Native	6	0.4%
Asian	2	0.1%
Native Hawaiian and Other Pacific Islander	1	0.1%
Some other race	12	0.7%
Two or more races	91	5.6%

=== Demographic estimates ===
As of 2020, the median household income was $55,150. In 2020, the median property value in Garden City was $114,100, and the homeownership rate was 67.3%.

None of the households in Garden City reported speaking a non-English language at home as their primary shared language. Most people in Garden City drove alone to work, and the average commute time was 31.5 minutes. The average car ownership was 2 cars per household.

=== 2010 census ===
As of the census of 2010, there were 1,642 people, 650 households, and 436 families residing in the city. The population density was 664.8 inhabitants per square mile (256.7/km^{2}). There were 721 housing units at an average density of 291.9 per square mile (112.7/km^{2}). The racial makeup of the city was 97.4% White, 0.2% African American, 0.9% Native American, 0.2% Asian, 0.4% from other races, and 0.9% from two or more races. Hispanic or Latino of any race were 1.7% of the population.

There were 650 households, of which 38.6% had children under the age of 18 living with them, 48.8% were married couples living together, 12.5% had a female householder with no husband present, 5.8% had a male householder with no wife present, and 32.9% were non-families. 27.4% of all households were made up of individuals, and 8.8% had someone living alone who was 65 years of age or older. The average household size was 2.53 and the average family size was 3.06.

The median age in the city was 33.1 years. 29.2% of residents were under the age of 18; 8.3% were between the ages of 18 and 24; 27.5% were from 25 to 44; 23.9% were from 45 to 64; and 11.2% were 65 years of age or older. The gender makeup of the city was 49.3% male and 50.7% female.

=== 2000 census ===
As of the census of 2000, there were 1,500 people, 595 households, and 399 families residing in the city. The population density was 869.0 inhabitants per square mile (335.5/km^{2}). There were 630 housing units at an average density of 365.0 per square mile (140.9/km^{2}). The racial makeup of the city was 97.73% White, 0.20% African American, 0.47% Native American, 0.33% from other races, and 1.27% from two or more races. Hispanic or Latino of any race were 1.47% of the population.

There were 595 households, out of which 35.5% had children under the age of 18 living with them, 53.3% were married couples living together, 10.3% had a female householder with no husband present, and 32.8% were non-families. 27.7% of all households were made up of individuals, and 13.4% had someone living alone who was 65 years of age or older. The average household size was 2.52 and the average family size was 3.11.

In the city the population was spread out, with 29.1% under the age of 18, 10.1% from 18 to 24, 30.3% from 25 to 44, 18.5% from 45 to 64, and 11.9% who were 65 years of age or older. The median age was 32 years. For every 100 females, there were 93.1 males. For every 100 females age 18 and over, there were 86.8 males.

The median income for a household in the city was $37,461, and the median income for a family was $43,125. Males had a median income of $31,848 versus $20,486 for females. The per capita income for the city was $19,695. About 7.7% of families and 8.0% of the population were below the poverty line, including 7.7% of those under age 18 and 7.1% of those age 65 or over.

== Education ==
Public education in Garden City is administered by the Sherwood Cass R-VIII School District, which covers approximately 190 square miles (490 km^{2}). The campus is located outside of Creighton. The district operates one elementary school, one middle school, and Sherwood High School consisting of roughly 960 students K-12.

Garden City has a public library, a branch of the Cass County Public Library.

Metropolitan Community College has the Sherwood Cass school district area in its service area, but not its in-district taxation area.

== Garden City Police Department ==
The City of Garden City operates a 24- hour police department, with the station being located at 106 N 3rd St. The police department currently consists of 9 employees: 1 police chief, 1 sergeant, 4 officers, 1 codes officer, and 2 office staff members.

The department operates many vehicles, including several 2016-2019 Ford Explorers and a 2020 Ford Fusion codes vehicle. As of the December 2024 council meeting, the city is seeking to order additional patrol vehicles.

The Chief of police is Michael Carr.

== Garden City Fire Protection District ==
The Garden City Fire Protection District was founded and chartered by the residents of the district and State of Missouri in 1972 after the fire service had been provided by a fire association since the 1800s. The fire district was an all volunteer department until July 2001 when it hired its first full-time employee.

The GCFPD protects more than 94 square miles of land. The district is currently protected by two fire stations, located at 300 Main Street, in Garden City. Station 2 located in Dayton, Missouri.

Currently, the department employs 15 part-time personnel and has 15 volunteer personnel. The department is staffed 24 hours per day and operates an EMS unit that is cross-staffed to operate fire apparatus. GCFPD has numerous apparatus, 2012, 2016 and 2019 EMS units(EMS 95, 96, 98), a 2020 Spartan Engine (E96) and a 2019 two-seat engine (E92), a 2006 3000-gallon tanker (T97), a 1996 Ford brush unit, a 2011 Ford brush unit, and a 2019 Ford brush unit (B91, B93, B96). Brush 91 and 96, EMS 98, and Engine 92 are located at station 2. The department also operates 2 command vehicles: Chief 1, a 2022 Ford Explorer, and Command 91, a 2024 Dodge Durango.

Finally, the Fire District's fire insurance rating is presently a Class 6 within the city limits. Outside the city limits (without hydrants) it is a Class 9.

== Notable people ==
- Tyler Farr - Country music singer-songwriter
- Ewing Kauffman - Businessman who founded Marion Laboratories and the first owner of the Kansas City Royals
