= Sammy Lane Resort Historic District =

Historic district in Missouri, United States

- Formerly listed on the U.S. National Register of Historic Places
- U.S. Historic district
- Location within Missouri Location within the United States
- Location: 320 E. Main St., Branson, Missouri
- Coordinates: 36°38′39″N 93°12′56″W
- Area: less than one acre
- Built: 1925
- Architectural style: Bungalow/craftsman
- MPS: Taneycomo Lakefront Tourism Resources of Branson MPS
- NRHP reference No.: 93000875

Significant dates
- Added to NRHP: August 31, 1993
- Removed from NRHP: April 25, 2003

Sammy Lane Resort Historic District was a national historic district located at Branson, Taney County, Missouri. The district encompassed four contributing buildings and two contributing structures built between 1925 and 1943 as part of a resort. They were four log and native rock resort cottages, an elaborate native rock landscape construction and a well house. The buildings and structures were excellent vernacular examples expressive of the Bungalow / American Craftsman aesthetic. The resort has been demolished and replaced with The Branson Landing.

It was listed on the National Register of Historic Places in 1993 and delisted in 2003.
