= David L. and Sallie Ann Stoutimore House =

Historic house in Missouri, United States

- David L. And Sallie Ann Stoutimore House
- U.S. National Register of Historic Places
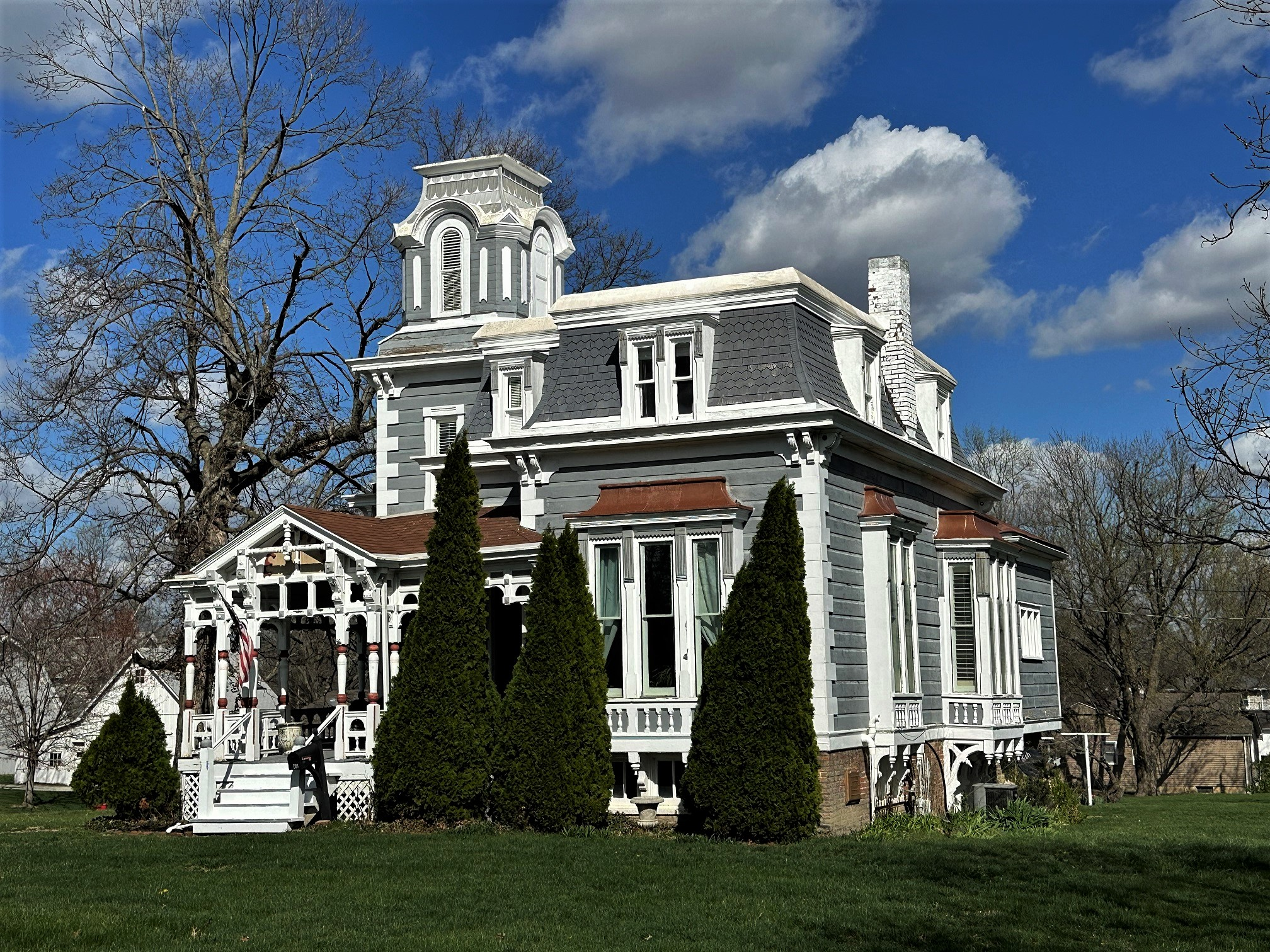
- The Stoutimore House in 2024

- Location within Missouri Location within the United States
- Location: 501 S. Birch Ave. Plattsburg, Missouri
- Coordinates: 39°33′39″N 94°27′06″W
- Area: 1.3 acres (0.53 ha)
- Built: c. 1892
- Architect: Bennett, Joseph H.
- Architectural style: Second Empire
- NRHP reference No.: 13000536
- Added to NRHP: July 23, 2013

David L. and Sallie Ann Stoutimore House, also known as the Jenkins House, is a historic home located at Plattsburg, Clinton County, Missouri. It was built in 1892, and is a 1 1/2-story, L-shaped, Second Empire style frame dwelling on a brick basement. It has a mansard roof and 2 1/2-story tower nook that projects above the roof. It features wood quoins, bracketed cornices, and a highly ornamented wraparound porch. Not to be confused with the Sallie House situated in Atchison, Kansas

It was listed on the National Register of Historic Places in 2013.
