= Calloway Manes Homestead =

Historic house in Missouri, United States

- U.S. National Register of Historic Places
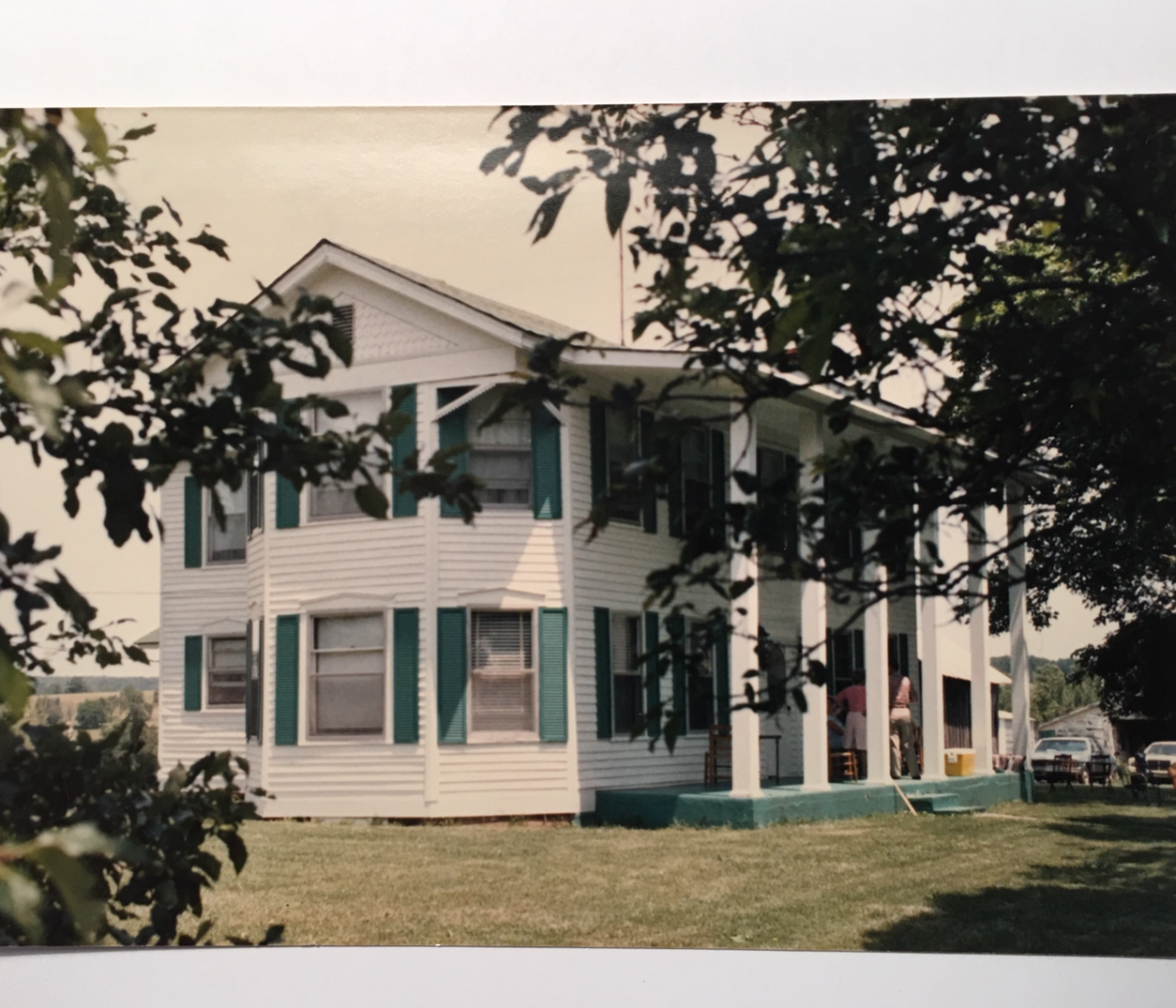

- Location within Missouri Location within the United States
- Location: Northwest of Richland, near Richland, Missouri
- Coordinates: 37°52′54″N 92°23′49″W
- Area: 0.1 acres (0.040 ha)
- Built: c. 1845; 181 years ago
- Built by: Manes, Calloway
- NRHP reference No.: 80002390
- Added to NRHP: June 6, 1980

Calloway Manes Homestead, also known as Doris and Raymond Powers House, is a historic home located near Richland, Pulaski County, Missouri. It was built about 1845, and is a two-story, five-bay, frame I-house with a two-story rear ell. The front facade features a two-story porch supporting six hollow square wood columns. It is one of the oldest residences in Pulaski County.

It was listed on the National Register of Historic Places in 1980.
