= Greenlawn Methodist Church and Cemetery =

Historic site in Ralls County, Missouri, US

- U.S. National Register of Historic Places
- Greenlawn Memorial Chapel in 2026

- Location within Missouri Location within the United States
- Location: Junction of Route J and County Road D, near Perry, Missouri
- Coordinates: 39°28′40″N 91°41′10″W
- Area: 1 acre (0.40 ha)
- Built: c. 1883
- Architectural style: Gable end church
- NRHP reference No.: 07000569
- Added to NRHP: June 21, 2007

Greenlawn Methodist Church and Cemetery, also known as Scobee Chapel and Greenlawn Memorial Chapel, is a historic Methodist church and cemetery located near Perry, Ralls County, Missouri. The church was built about 1883, and is a one-story, rectangular frame building on a stone pier foundation. It measures 26 feet, 6 inches, by 40 feet, 6 inches, has a gable front, and is sheathed in clapboard siding. The cemetery contains 196 graves with stones dating from 1883 to the present.

It was listed on the National Register of Historic Places in 2007.
