= Walnut Park Farm Historic District =

Historic district in Missouri, United States

- U.S. National Register of Historic Places
- U.S. Historic district
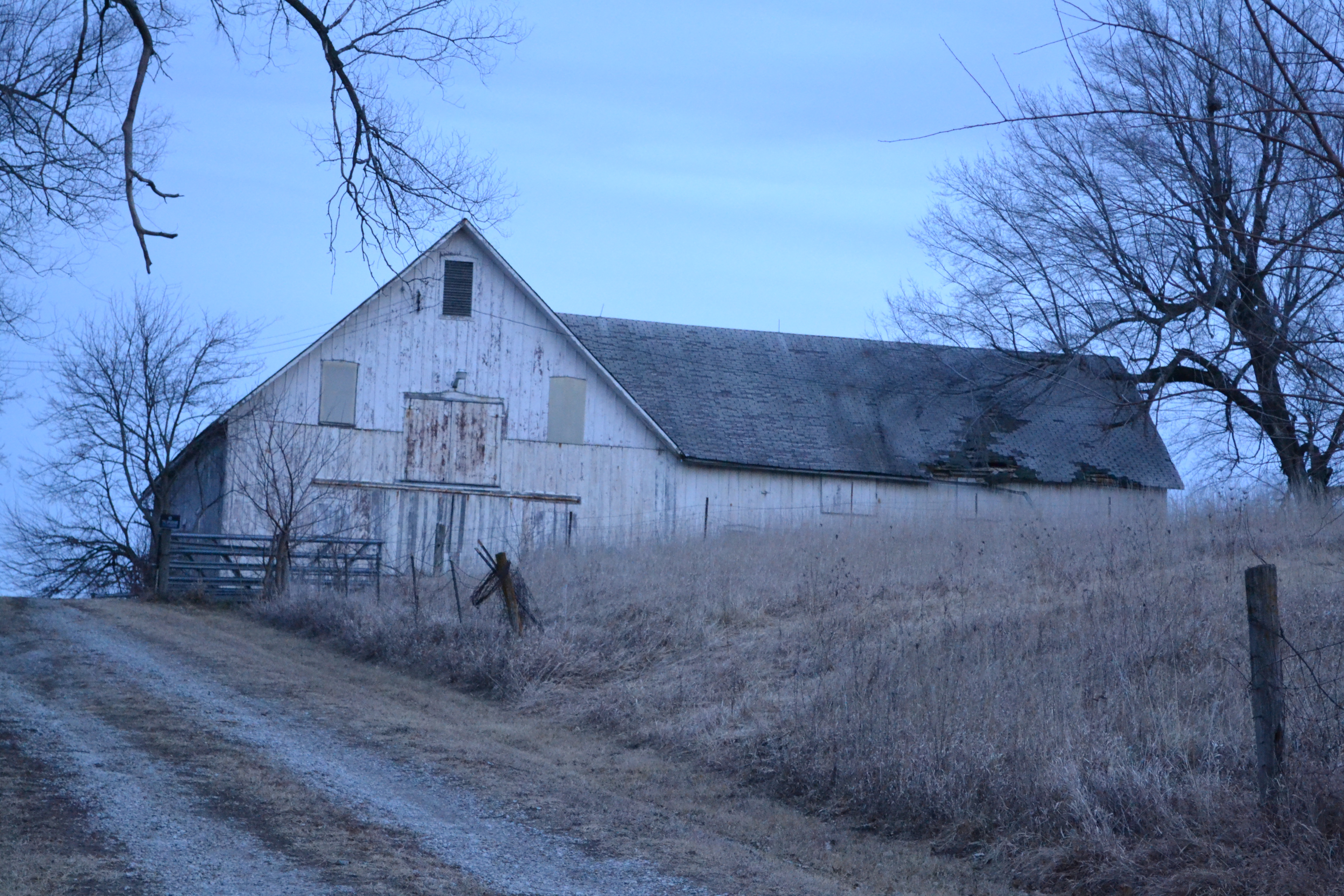

- Location within Missouri Location within the United States
- Nearest city: Jct. of MO 59 and MO 71, near St. Joseph, Missouri
- Coordinates: 39°49′56″N 94°48′46″W
- Area: 87 acres (35 ha)
- Architectural style: Gabled ell
- NRHP reference No.: 99001597
- Added to NRHP: December 22, 1999

Walnut Park Farm Historic District, also known as the R.L. McDonald Farm, Country Club Farm, Creek Farm, and Schreiber Farm, is a historic farm and national historic district near St. Joseph, Andrew County, Missouri. The district encompasses four contributing buildings, one contributing site, and one contributing structure on a livestock breeding farm near St. Joseph. It developed between about 1870 and 1914, and includes a brick, 1 1/2-story gabled ell residence (c. 1880), an L-form basement barn (c. 1870), a stable (c. 1890), root cellar (c. 1900), and the site of an enclosed track and show ring where the farm's purebred horses were trained and shown to prospective buyers (c. 1880). The brick residence has since been demolished.

It was listed on the National Register of Historic Places in 1999.
