= Ava Ranger Station Historic District =

Historic district in Missouri, United States

- U.S. National Register of Historic Places
- U.S. Historic district
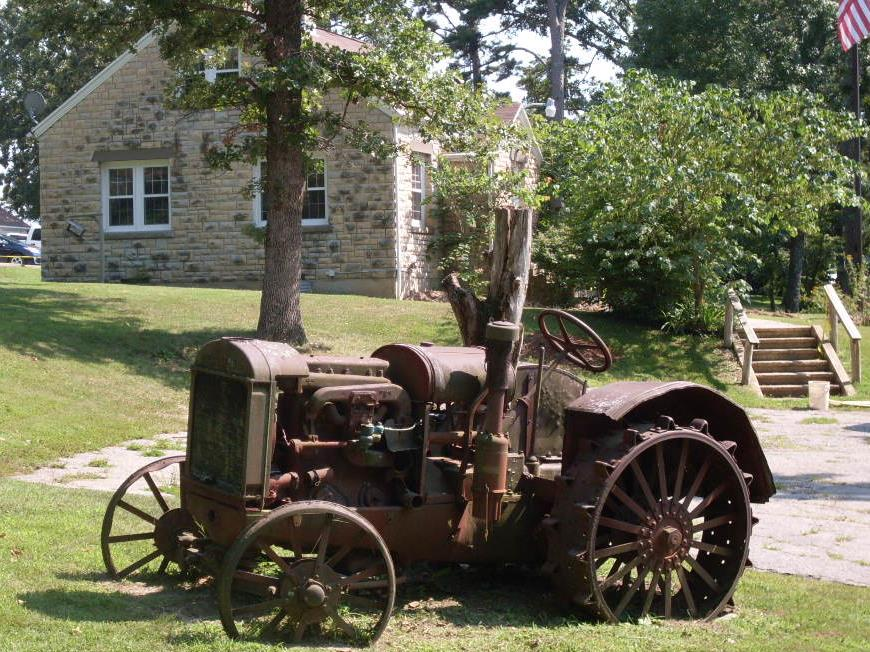
- Old tractor by the Ava ranger station, July 2014

- Location within Missouri Location within the United States
- Location: MO 5S, Ava, Missouri
- Coordinates: 36°56′15″N 92°39′41″W
- Area: 5.7 acres (2.3 ha)
- Built: 1936
- Built by: Civilian Conservation Corps
- Architectural style: Colonial Revival
- MPS: Mark Twain National Forest MPS
- NRHP reference No.: 03000714
- Added to NRHP: August 4, 2003

Ava Ranger Station Historic District is a national historic district located near Ava, Douglas County, Missouri. The district encompasses five frame and limestone buildings constructed by Civilian Conservation Corps in 1936. They are the 1 1/2-story, Colonial Revival style Ranger's Office; 1 1/2-story, Colonial Revival style Ranger's Dwelling; garage; warehouse and an oil house. It continues to be used as a Ranger Station for the Mark Twain National Forest.

It was listed on the National Register of Historic Places in 2003.
