= O'Bannon Homestead =

Historic house in Missouri, United States

- U.S. National Register of Historic Places
- Location within Missouri Location within the United States
- Location: Northeast of Garden City off Route N, near Garden City, Missouri
- Coordinates: 38°34′24″N 94°9′25″W
- Area: 4.2 acres (1.7 ha)
- Built: 1893; 133 years ago
- Built by: King, Christian
- Architectural style: Queen Anne, Classic Box
- NRHP reference No.: 79001356
- Added to NRHP: July 3, 1979

O'Bannon Homestead, also known as Schuyler Stock Farm, Steeple House, and Four Leaf Clover Farm, is a historic home and farm complex located near Garden City, Cass County, Missouri. The farmhouse was built in 1893, and is a two-story, rectangular, frame dwelling with Queen Anne style embellishments. It features stained glass, an encircling verandah, an octagonal tower, and decorative spindle, spool and shingle work. Also on the property are six contributing outbuildings: a wash house / smokehouse, work house, pump house, chicken house, outhouse, and barn.

It was listed on the National Register of Historic Places in 1979.
