= Perry, Missouri =

- City
- Downtown Perry

- Location of Perry, Missouri
- Coordinates: 39°25′48″N 91°39′53″W
- Country: United States
- State: Missouri
- County: Ralls
- Incorporated: 1891

Area
  - Total: 1.43 sq mi (3.70 km^{2})
  - Land: 1.38 sq mi (3.58 km^{2})
  - Water: 0.046 sq mi (0.12 km^{2})
- Elevation: 728 ft (222 m)

Population (2020)
  - Total: 665
  - Density: 481/sq mi (185.7/km^{2})
- Time zone: UTC-6 (Central (CST))
  - Summer (DST): UTC-5 (CDT)
- ZIP code: 63462
- Area code: 573
- FIPS code: 29-57080
- GNIS feature ID: 2396184

Perry is a city in southwest Ralls County, Missouri, United States. The population was 665 at the 2020 census. It is part of the Hannibal Micropolitan Statistical Area.

== History ==
Perry was platted in 1866, and named after William Perry Crostwaite, a first settler. A post office called Perry has been in operation since 1866.

Greenlawn Methodist Church and Cemetery was listed on the National Register of Historic Places in 2007.

== Geography ==
According to the United States Census Bureau, the city has a total area of 1.30 square miles (3.37 km^{2}), of which 1.26 square miles (3.26 km^{2}) is land and 0.04 square miles (0.10 km^{2}) is water.

== Demographics ==
Historical population
Census	Pop.	Note	%±
1880	147		—
1890	316		115.0%
1900	624		97.5%
1910	895		43.4%
1920	838		−6.4%
1930	976		16.5%
1940	830		−15.0%
1950	813		−2.0%
1960	802		−1.4%
1970	839		4.6%
1980	836		−0.4%
1990	711		−15.0%
2000	666		−6.3%
2010	693		4.1%
2020	665		−4.0%
U.S. Decennial Census

=== 2010 census ===
As of the census of 2010, there were 693 people, 323 households, and 191 families living in the city. The population density was 550.0 inhabitants per square mile (212.4/km^{2}). There were 436 housing units at an average density of 346.0 per square mile (133.6/km^{2}). The racial makeup of the city was 97.7% White, 0.1% Native American, 1.0% from other races, and 1.2% from two or more races. Hispanic or Latino of any race were 3.5% of the population.

There were 323 households, of which 22.9% had children under the age of 18 living with them, 46.4% were married couples living together, 9.6% had a female householder with no husband present, 3.1% had a male householder with no wife present, and 40.9% were non-families. 34.1% of all households were made up of individuals, and 18.2% had someone living alone who was 65 years of age or older. The average household size was 2.15 and the average family size was 2.74.

The median age in the city was 48.1 years. 18.5% of residents were under the age of 18; 6.2% were between the ages of 18 and 24; 21.3% were from 25 to 44; 32.3% were from 45 to 64; and 21.5% were 65 years of age or older. The gender makeup of the city was 50.8% male and 49.2% female.

=== 2000 census ===
As of the census of 2000, there were 666 people, 310 households, and 168 families living in the city. The population density was 542.7 inhabitants per square mile (209.5/km^{2}). There were 431 housing units at an average density of 351.2 per square mile (135.6/km^{2}). The racial makeup of the city was 98.65% White, 0.60% African American, 0.60% Native American and 0.15% Asian. Hispanic or Latino of any race were 0.75% of the population.

There were 310 households, out of which 23.5% had children under the age of 18 living with them, 45.8% were married couples living together, 6.8% had a female householder with no husband present, and 45.5% were non-families. 41.6% of all households were made up of individuals, and 24.8% had someone living alone who was 65 years of age or older. The average household size was 2.05 and the average family size was 2.79.

In the city the population was spread out, with 19.2% under the age of 18, 8.0% from 18 to 24, 21.9% from 25 to 44, 23.3% from 45 to 64, and 27.6% who were 65 years of age or older. The median age was 46 years. For every 100 females, there were 78.6 males. For every 100 females age 18 and over, there were 75.8 males.

The median income for a household in the city was $30,625, and the median income for a family was $35,000. Males had a median income of $29,135 versus $17,656 for females. The per capita income for the city was $18,304. About 5.2% of families and 7.4% of the population were below the poverty line, including 7.8% of those under age 18 and 10.1% of those age 65 or over.
