= Saverton, Missouri =

Unincorporated community in Missouri, United States

- Census-Designated Place
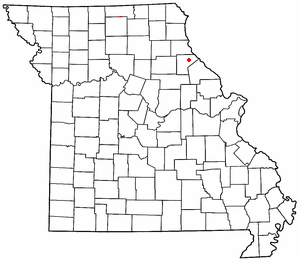
- Location of Saverton in Missouri
- Coordinates: 39°38′48″N 91°16′21″W
- Country: United States
- State: Missouri
- County: Ralls

Area
  - Total: 1.27 sq mi (3.29 km^{2})
  - Land: 0.97 sq mi (2.50 km^{2})
  - Water: 0.31 sq mi (0.80 km^{2})
- Elevation: 492 ft (150 m)

Population (2020)
  - Total: 213
  - Density: 220.7/sq mi (85.23/km^{2})
- FIPS code: 29-66062
- GNIS feature ID: 2806421

Saverton is an unincorporated community in eastern Ralls County, Missouri, United States. As of the 2020 census, Saverton had a population of 213. It is located adjacent to the Mississippi River, approximately ten miles southeast of Hannibal. Saverton is part of the Hannibal Micropolitan Statistical Area.

Saverton was founded in 1819 and is named after the local Saverton family, who were likely prominent in the area. A post office called Saverton has been in operation since 1832.

Saverton School was listed on the National Register of Historic Places in 1998.

== Demographics ==
Historical population
Census	Pop.	Note	%±
2020	213		—
U.S. Decennial Census

Saverton first appeared as a census designated place in the 2020 U.S. census.
