= Isiah Mansur Farmstead Historic District =

Historic district in Missouri, United States

- U.S. National Register of Historic Places
- U.S. Historic district
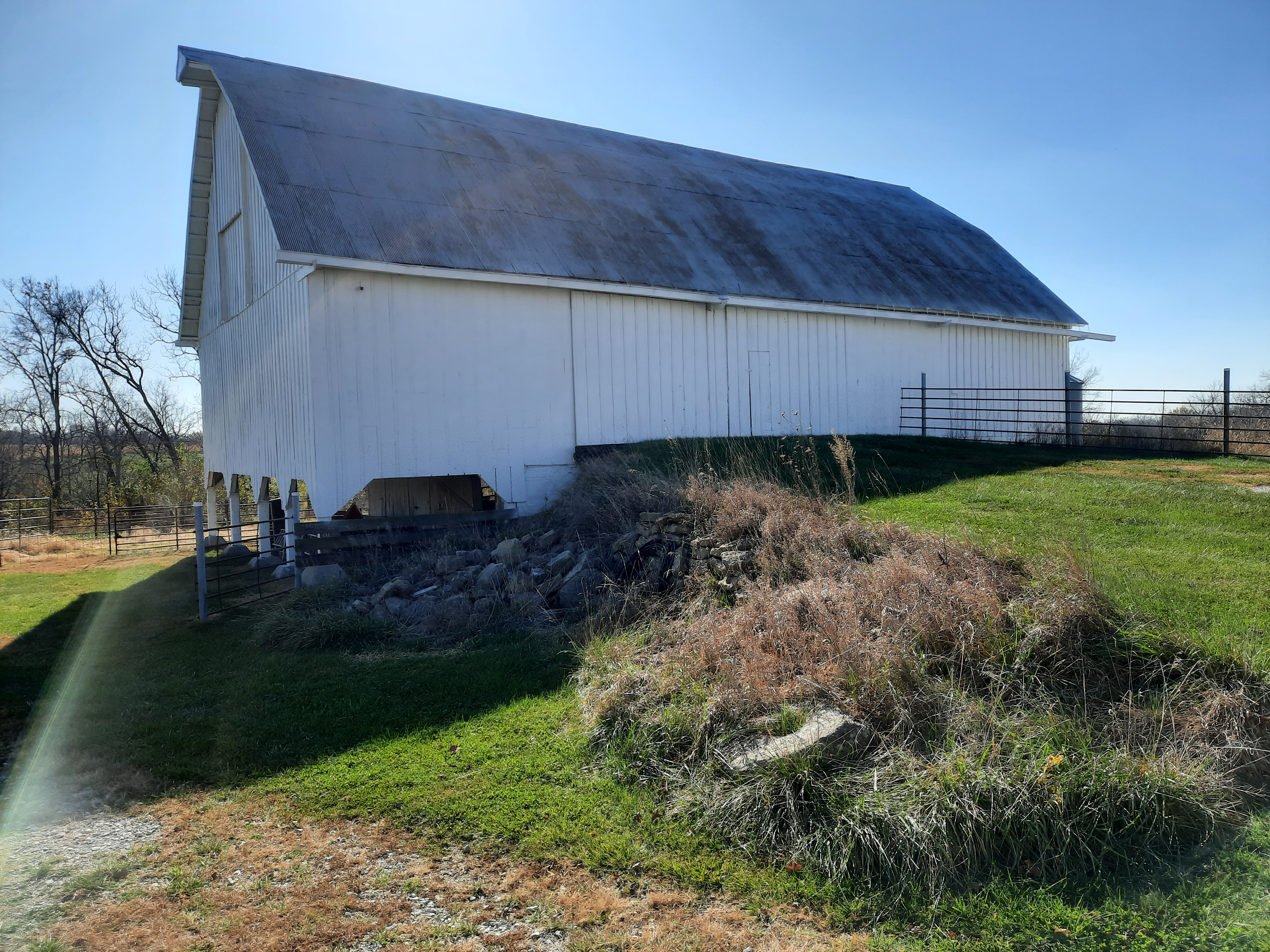

- Location within Missouri Location within the United States
- Location: 17740 Highway E., near Richmond, Missouri
- Coordinates: 39°24′46″N 93°53′11″W
- Area: 400 acres (160 ha)
- Built: 1842
- Architectural style: I-house
- NRHP reference No.: 98001063
- Added to NRHP: August 14, 1998

Isiah Mansur Farmstead Historic District, also known as Rock Hall, is a historic home and farm and national historic district located near Richmond, Ray County, Missouri. The district encompasses eight contributing buildings, one contributing site, and three contributing structures on a farm developed between the mid-19th and mid-20th centuries. The contributing resources include the main farmhouse (1842, 1858 addition), a buggy house (c. 1905), a large barn (c. 1909), an engine house (c.1900), a small barn (c. 1920), a brooder house (c. 1920), a hen house (c. 1920), a smokehouse (c. 1935), a house well (c. 1840), a field well (c. 1934), and a wellhouse (also known as "the pump house," c. 1945). The main farmhouse is a two-story, five-bay, frame I-house.

It was listed on the National Register of Historic Places in 1998.
