= Harper, Missouri =

Unincorporated community in Missouri, U.S.

Coordinates: 38°03′45″N 93°31′07″W

Harper is an unincorporated community in St. Clair County, in the U.S. state of Missouri. The community is on Missouri Route 82 approximately ten miles east of Osceola and within one mile of the St. Clair - Hickory county line.

== History ==
A post office called Harper was established in 1891, and remained in operation until 1917. The community has the name of H. G. Harper, a pioneer citizen who secured the town a post office.

The Harper School was added to the National Register of Historic Places in 2007.
