= Urbauer Fishing Lodge Historic District =

Historic district in Missouri, United States

- U.S. National Register of Historic Places
- U.S. Historic district
- Location within Missouri Location within the United States
- Location: 442 Riverbird Ln., Camdenton, Missouri
- Coordinates: 37°57′45″N 92°50′5″W
- Area: 4.9 acres (2.0 ha)
- Architectural style: Rustic
- NRHP reference No.: 06000989
- Added to NRHP: November 8, 2006

Urbauer Fishing Lodge Historic District, also known as the Mozark Club and Windsor Estates Mental Health Facility, is a national historic district located near Roach, Camden County, Missouri. It encompasses five contributing buildings, one contributing site, and one contributing structure constructed by St. Louis industrialist Hugo Urbauer as a private fishing retreat.

It was developed about 1930, and includes the main lodge, a Bungalow style house, a seven-vehicle garage, pumphouse, a set of 83 concrete stairs leading down to the Niangua River, and a small concrete storage building. The main lodge is a one- to two-story building constructed of sandstone, limestone and cinderblock. It as a gable roof with wide overhanging eaves.

It was listed on the National Register of Historic Places in 2006.
