= A. Taylor Ray House =

Historic house in Missouri, United States

- A. Ray Taylor House
- U.S. National Register of Historic Places
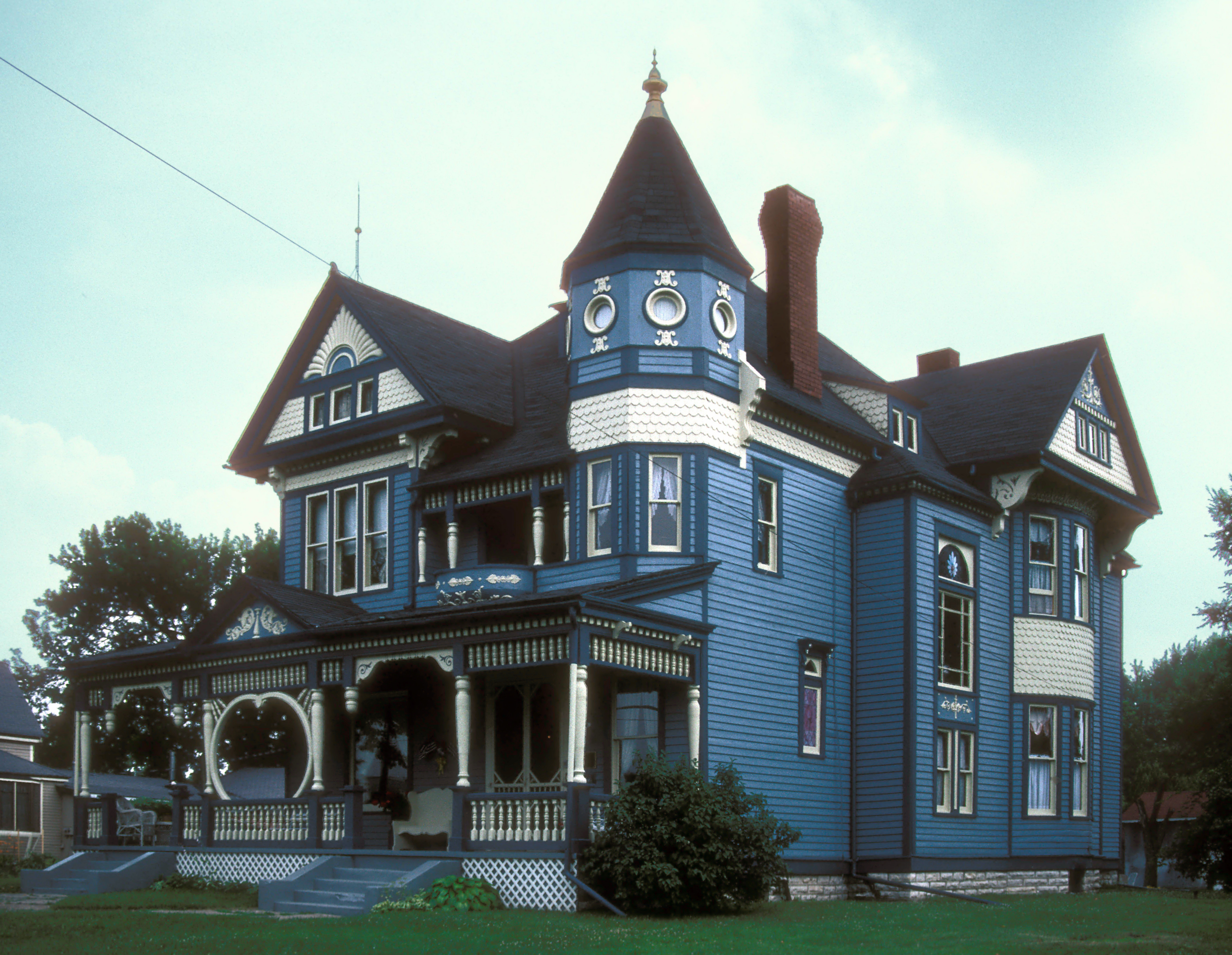
- The A. Ray Taylor House in 2007

- Location within Missouri Location within the United States
- Location: 212 W. Van Buren St., Gallatin, Missouri
- Coordinates: 39°54′48″N 93°57′50″W
- Area: 0.5 acres (0.20 ha)
- Built: 1896
- Architect: George Tuggle
- Architectural style: Queen Anne
- NRHP reference No.: 82003135
- Added to NRHP: April 12, 1982

A. Taylor Ray House, also known as the Tuggle House, is a historic home located at Gallatin, Daviess County, Missouri. Designed by George Tuggle for business A. Taylor Ray and his wife, it was built in 1896, and is a two-story, free classic Queen Anne style frame dwelling. It sits on a cut limestone foundation and is topped by pyramid, gable, hip, shed and mansard roofs. It features an octagonal tower and wraparound ornamented verandah.

It was listed on the National Register of Historic Places in 1980.
