= Onyx Cave (Newburg, Missouri) =

Cave in Missouri, U.S.

- U.S. National Register of Historic Places
- Location within Missouri Location within the United States
- Location: 14705 Private Drive 8541, near Newburg, Missouri
- Coordinates: 37°53′08″N 92°01′47″W
- Area: 43.7 acres (17.7 ha)
- Built: 1892
- NRHP reference No.: 99000529
- Added to NRHP: May 21, 1999

Onyx Cave, also known as King Cave and Boiling Springs Cave, is a historic natural cave located near Newburg, Pulaski County, Missouri. The cave consists of the main room measuring approximately 85 feet wide, 250 feet long, and 33 feet high, and two passageways. The cave features translucent cave onyx that is pure white to cream in color, some with reddish-colored banding. Formations range from the common stalactites, stalagmites, and columns, to beautiful draperies. An 8 foot by 13 foot vertical shaft was sunk in 1892 to mine the onyx.

It was listed on the National Register of Historic Places in 1999.
