= Ray County Poor Farm =

- U.S. National Register of Historic Places
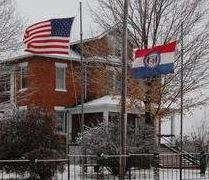
- Ray County Poor Farm, December 2011

- Location within Missouri Location within the United States
- Location: W. Royale St., Richmond, Missouri
- Coordinates: 39°16′22″N 93°59′20″W
- Area: less than one acre
- Built: 1909-1910
- Built by: Alnutt, Woodson
- Architect: Garver, William
- NRHP reference No.: 79001394
- Added to NRHP: July 10, 1979

Ray County Poor Farm, also known as Ray County Historical Society and Museum, is a historic poor farm located at Richmond, Ray County, Missouri. It was built in 1909–1910, and is a two-story, Y-shaped brick building encompassing contains approximately 14,400 square feet of space. It was originally used to house and care for the poor and indigent. It currently houses a local history museum.

It was added to the National Register of Historic Places in 1979.
