= Mitchell Petroglyph Archeological Site =

- U.S. National Register of Historic Places
- Nearest city: Cairo, Missouri
- Area: 0 acres (0 ha)
- NRHP reference No.: 69000124
- Added to NRHP: June 23, 1969

Mitchell Petroglyph Archeological Site, also known as the Missouri Archeological Survey Number 23RN1 , is a historic archaeological site located near Cairo, Randolph County, Missouri. The site was documented during 1944, and includes petroglyphs identified as a full-tailed thunderbird, a large human-like figure and several thunderbirds, male and female sexual motifs, and shaman or human-like spirit.

It was listed on the National Register of Historic Places in 1969.
