= John Garth House =

Historic house in Missouri, United States

- U.S. National Register of Historic Places
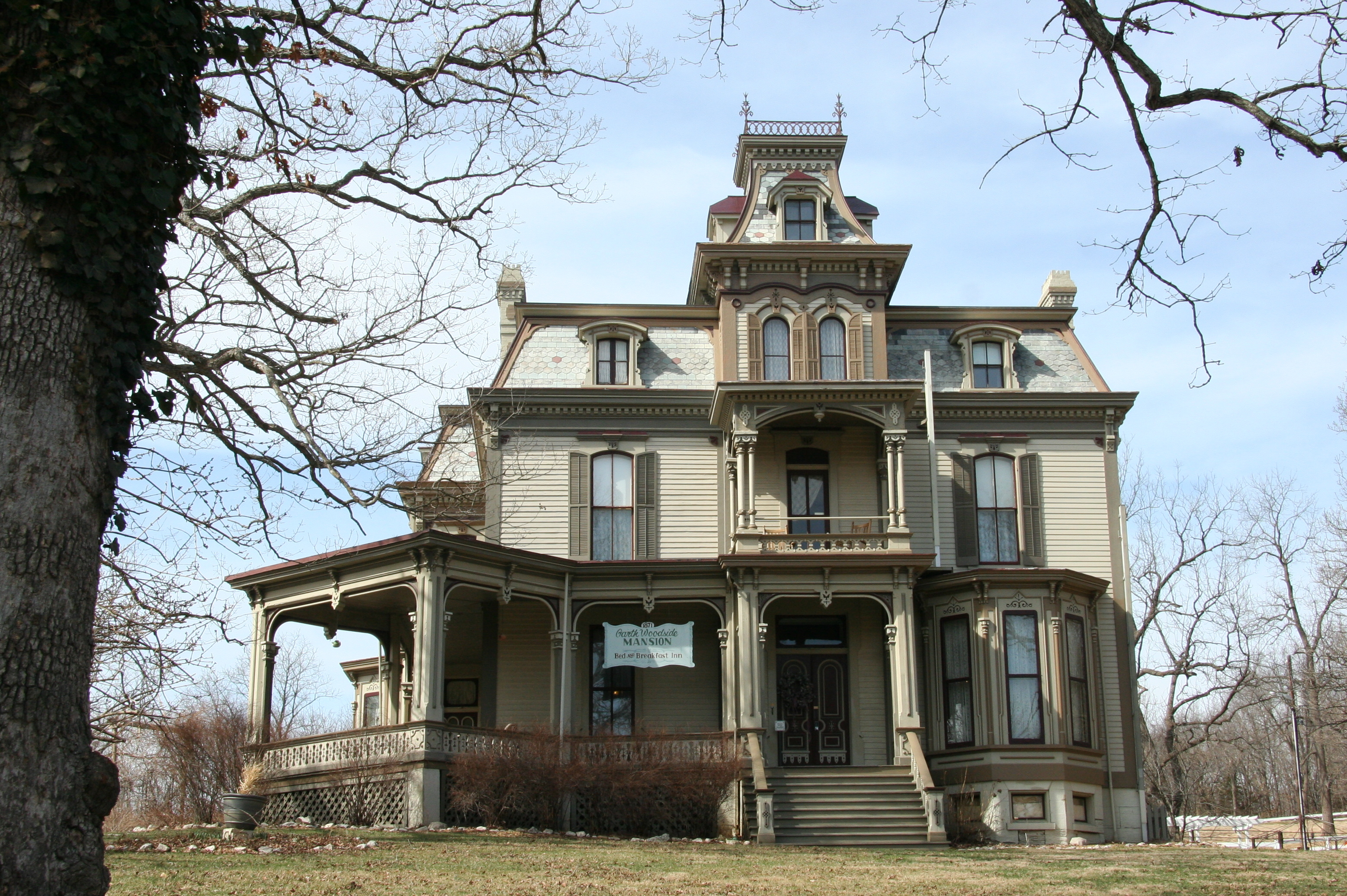
- John Garth House, March 2011

- Location within Missouri Location within the United States
- Location: South of Hannibal off U.S. Route 61, near Hannibal, Missouri
- Coordinates: 39°40′10″N 91°24′33″W
- Area: 38 acres (15 ha)
- Built: c. 1871
- Architectural style: Second Empire
- NRHP reference No.: 77000813
- Added to NRHP: July 11, 1977

John Garth House, also known as Woodside Place, is a historic home located near Hannibal, Ralls County, Missouri. It was built about 1871, and is a 2 1/2-story, Second Empire style frame dwelling. It measures approximately 99 feet by 54 feet and sits on a limestone block foundation. It features mansard roofs, projecting tower, four porches, and two semi-octagonal bay windows. It was built as a summer home for John H. Garth a prominent local citizen of Hannibal, Missouri and friend of Samuel Clemens. It is operated as Garth Woodside Mansion Bed and Breakfast Inn.

It was listed on the National Register of Historic Places in 1977.
