= Samuel T. and Mary B. Parnell House =

Historic house in Missouri, United States

- U.S. National Register of Historic Places
- Location within Missouri Location within the United States
- Location: 220 Angels Trail, near Branson, Missouri
- Coordinates: 36°38′31″N 93°12′37″W
- Area: 5.9 acres (2.4 ha)
- Built: c. 1912
- Architectural style: Bungalow/craftsman, Ozark Rock Masonry
- NRHP reference No.: 08000333
- Added to NRHP: April 25, 2008

Samuel T. and Mary B. Parnell House, also known as Mt. Branson Lodge, is a historic home located near Branson, Taney County, Missouri. It was built about 1912 and is a two-story, American Craftsman-style dwelling constructed of irregular rubble courses of native stone. The façade features a partial-width, two-story porch supported by massive, battered stone piers. Also located on the property is a contributing one-story, rock and wood-frame garage.

The home was listed on the National Register of Historic Places in 2008.
