= Rutledge School =

- U.S. National Register of Historic Places
- Location within Missouri Location within the United States
- Location: 142 2nd St., Rutledge, Missouri
- Coordinates: 40°18′58″N 92°05′15″W
- Area: Less than 1 acre (0.40 ha)
- Built: 1912, 1966
- Built by: Williford, John T.
- Architect: Schrage, William F
- Architectural style: Georgian Revival
- NRHP reference No.: 100000608
- Added to NRHP: January 31, 2017

Rutledge School, also known as Rutledge Public School, is a historic school building on the north end of 2nd St at Rutledge, Scotland County, Missouri. It was built in 1912, and is a two-story rectangular brick building with Georgian Revival style design elements. It has a full basement and gymnasium added in 1966. It measures 46 feet by 59 feet, and has a medium hipped roof, a double-leaf entrance with a fanlight, and projecting bell tower with the original bell. The schoolyard is a contributing site. The school closed in 1995.

It was added to the National Register of Historic Places in 2017.
