= Community Theater (Newburg, Missouri) =

- U.S. National Register of Historic Places
- Location within Missouri Location within the United States
- Location: 117 First St., Newburg, Missouri
- Coordinates: 37°54′52″N 91°54′5″W
- Area: less than one acre
- Built: 1919
- Built by: Burns, William Franklin
- Architectural style: One part commercial block
- NRHP reference No.: 06001134
- Added to NRHP: December 20, 2006

Community Theater, also known as the Lyric Theater, Newburg Theater, and Regional Opera Company, is a historic theatre building located at Newburg, Phelps County, Missouri. It was built in 1919, and is a one-story, rectangular brick building. It has a front gable roof behind a stepped parapet and segmental arched windows flanking the rounded arched central entrance. Until 1955, the building acted as a movie theater, lecture hall and stage for small plays and community events. More recently, the building has seen a rebirth as a theater for small stage productions.

It was listed on the National Register of Historic Places in 2006.
