= Unionville Square Historic District =

Historic district in Missouri, United States

- U.S. National Register of Historic Places
- U.S. Historic district
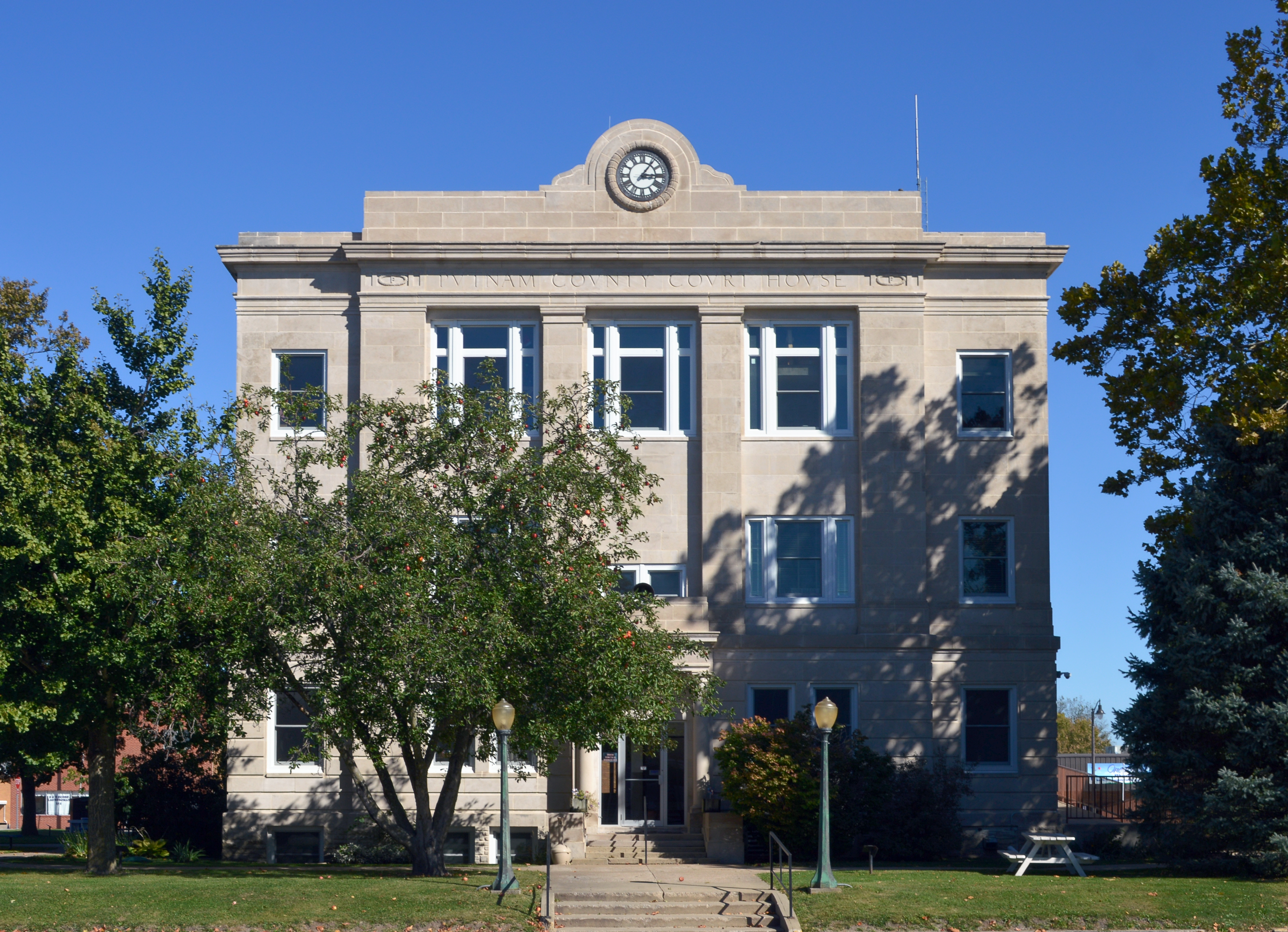
- Unionville Square Historic District, October 2015

- Location within Missouri Location within the United States
- Location: Roughly along portions of Main, Grant., 16th and 17th Sts., Unionville, Missouri
- Coordinates: 40°28′36″N 93°0′8″W
- Area: 5.2 acres (2.1 ha)
- Built: 1872
- Architect: Francis, W.C.; et.al.
- Architectural style: Italianate, Colonial Revival
- NRHP reference No.: 02000793
- Added to NRHP: July 19, 2002

Unionville Square Historic District is a national historic district located at Unionville, Putnam County, Missouri. The district encompasses 61 contributing buildings and 1 contributing structure in the central business district of Unionville. It developed between about 1872 and 1951, and includes representative examples of Italianate and Colonial Revival style architecture. Notable buildings include the Putnam County Courthouse (1923-1924), O. J. Townsend Block (1889-1890), United States Farm Service Agency (1951), United States Soil Conservation Service (1951), Putnam County Library (1951), Putnam County Historical Museum (1912–13, 1928), United States Post Office (1930-1931), Unionville City Hall (1894-1897), and the Putnam County Senior Center (1892).

It was listed on the National Register of Historic Places in 2002.
