= Mount Pleasant Township, Scotland County, Missouri =

Township in Scotland County, Missouri, U.S.

Coordinates: 40.3414°N 92.3006°W

Mount Pleasant Township is an inactive township in Scotland County, in the U.S. state of Missouri.

Mount Pleasant Township was erected in 1836.
