= Southwest Missouri Prehistoric Rock Shelter and Cave Sites Discontiguous Archeological District =

- U.S. National Register of Historic Places
- Nearest city: Cato, Missouri
- Area: less than one acre
- MPS: Prehistoric Rock Shelter and Cave Sites in Southwestern Missouri MPS
- NRHP reference No.: 91002046
- Added to NRHP: October 24, 1991

The Southwest Missouri Prehistoric Rock Shelter and Cave Sites Discontiguous Archeological District is a historic district spread out over discontiguous sites in four Missouri counties. It includes 20 contributing sites. It was listed on the National Register of Historic Places in 1991.
