= Austin, Missouri =

Unincorporated community in Cass County, Missouri

Coordinates: 38°30′10″N 94°18′0″W

Austin is an unincorporated community in Cass County, in the U.S. state of Missouri. It is part of the Kansas City metropolitan area.

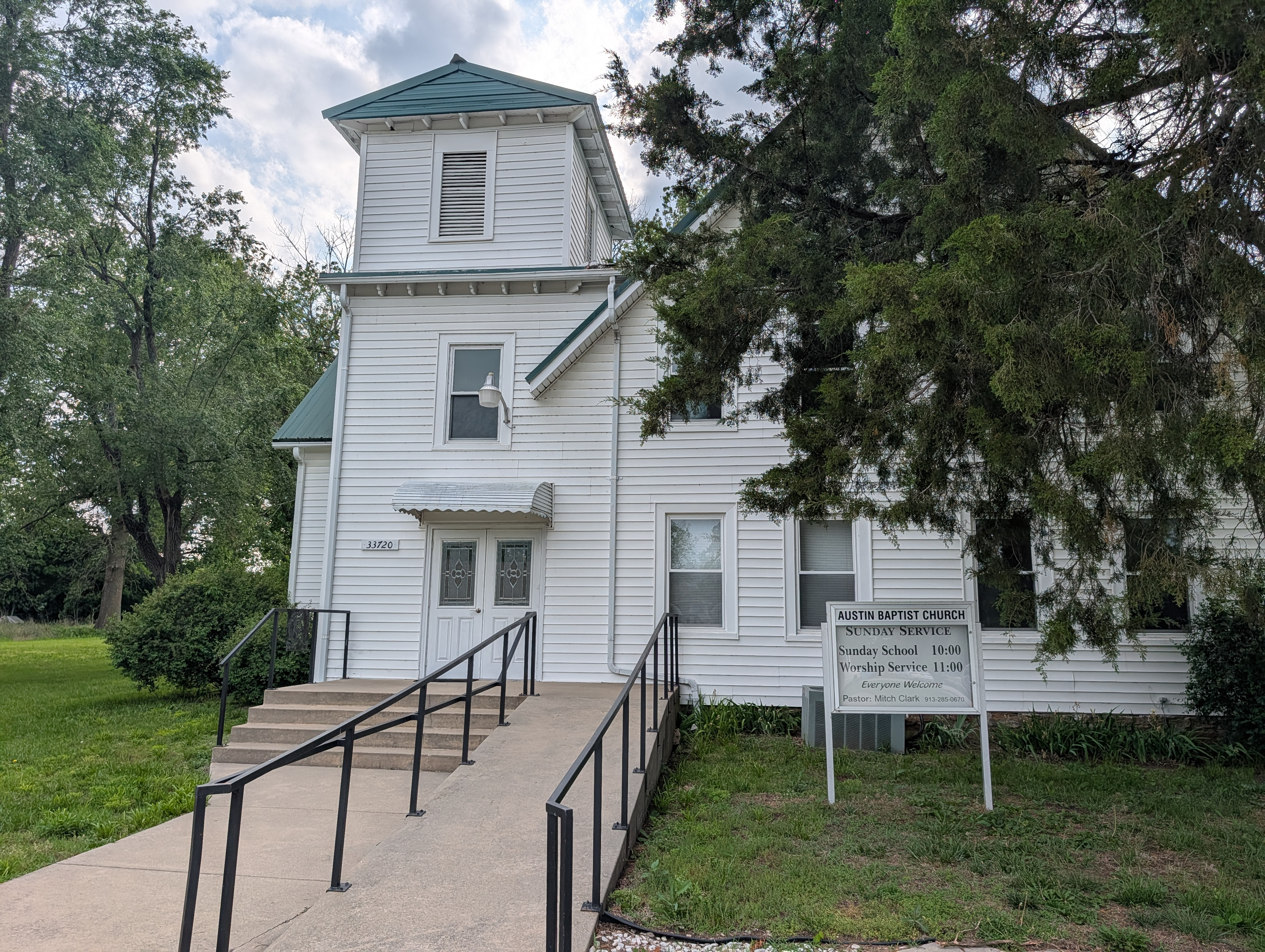
Austin Baptist Church in Austin, Missouri

== History ==
The community was named after William Austin, a local merchant. A post office called Austin was established in 1856, and closed in 1918. In 1925, Austin had 19 inhabitants.

The Stumbaugh Post No. 180 GAR Hall was listed on the National Register of Historic Places in 2000.
