= Branson City Park Historic District =

Historic district in Missouri, United States

- U.S. National Register of Historic Places
- U.S. Historic district
- Location within Missouri Location within the United States
- Location: Jct. of St. Limas and Oklahoma Sts., Branson, Missouri
- Coordinates: 36°38′45″N 93°12′50″W
- Area: less than one acre
- Built: 1934
- Built by: Works Progress Administration
- Architectural style: Bungalow/craftsman
- MPS: Taneycomo Lakefront Tourism Resources of Branson MPS
- NRHP reference No.: 93000874
- Added to NRHP: August 31, 1993

Branson City Park Historic District was a national historic district located at Branson, Taney County, Missouri. The district encompassed one contributing site and two contributing structures built between 1934 and 1943 as part of a Works Progress Administration project. They were the Mang Field Bleachers, Mang baseball field and the Stone Bleachers. The bleacher structures were good examples of the use of rustic native stone by means of the slab rock technique. The park has been demolished and replaced with The Branson Landing.

It was listed on the National Register of Historic Places in 1993.
