= Stumbaugh Post No. 180 GAR Hall =

- U.S. National Register of Historic Places
- Location within Missouri Location within the United States
- Location: Missouri Hwy T, Austin, Missouri
- Coordinates: 38°30′12″N 94°17′59″W
- Area: less than one acre
- Built: 1892
- NRHP reference No.: 00000694
- Added to NRHP: June 8, 2000

Stumbaugh Post No. 180 GAR Hall, also known as Austin Community Hall, was a historic Grand Army of the Republic hall located at Austin, Cass County, Missouri. It was built in 1893, and is a one-story, T-shaped frame building. It has a gable roof and displays little ornamentation, typical of rural vernacular buildings. From 1892 to 1911 the building served the local chapter of the Grand Army of the Republic (G.A.R.) as the veterans meeting hall. It was used as a community center until 1996.

It was listed on the National Register of Historic Places in 2000. The clubhouse was razed in 2007.
