= Cairo, Missouri =

- Village
- Location of Cairo, Missouri
- Coordinates: 39°30′40″N 92°26′28″W
- Country: United States
- State: Missouri
- County: Randolph

Area
  - Total: 0.30 sq mi (0.78 km^{2})
  - Land: 0.30 sq mi (0.78 km^{2})
  - Water: 0 sq mi (0.00 km^{2})
- Elevation: 860 ft (260 m)

Population (2020)
  - Total: 205
  - Density: 683.1/sq mi (263.76/km^{2})
- Time zone: UTC-6 (Central (CST))
  - Summer (DST): UTC-5 (CDT)
- ZIP code: 65239
- Area code: 660
- FIPS code: 29-10360
- GNIS feature ID: 2397523
- Website: villageofcairo.com

Cairo is a village in Randolph County, Missouri, United States. As of the 2020 census, Cairo had a population of 205. The pronunciation is Kay-row, unlike the city in Egypt.

== History ==
Cairo was originally called "Fairview", and under the latter name was founded in 1858. The village was named after Cairo, Egypt, perhaps via Cairo, Illinois. A post office called Cairo has been in operation since 1860.

The Mitchell Petroglyph Archeological Site was listed on the National Register of Historic Places in 1969.

== Geography ==
According to the United States Census Bureau, the village has a total area of 0.31 square miles (0.80 km^{2}), all land.

== Demographics ==
Historical population
Census	Pop.	Note	%±
1880	100		—
1900	173		—
1910	220		27.2%
1920	221		0.5%
1930	250		13.1%
1940	254		1.6%
1950	264		3.9%
1960	210		−20.5%
1970	248		18.1%
1980	315		27.0%
1990	282		−10.5%
2000	293		3.9%
2010	292		−0.3%
2020	205		−29.8%
U.S. Decennial Census

=== 2010 census ===
As of the census of 2010, there were 292 people, 106 households, and 83 families living in the village. The population density was 941.9 inhabitants per square mile (363.7/km^{2}). There were 125 housing units at an average density of 403.2 per square mile (155.7/km^{2}). The racial makeup of the village was 96.2% White, 0.7% African American, 0.7% Native American, 0.7% Asian, and 1.7% from two or more races.

There were 106 households, of which 45.3% had children under the age of 18 living with them, 47.2% were married couples living together, 23.6% had a female householder with no husband present, 7.5% had a male householder with no wife present, and 21.7% were non-families. 18.9% of all households were made up of individuals, and 7.6% had someone living alone who was 65 years of age or older. The average household size was 2.75 and the average family size was 3.06.

The median age in the village was 35 years. 31.2% of residents were under the age of 18; 9.2% were between the ages of 18 and 24; 21.6% were from 25 to 44; 22.3% were from 45 to 64; and 15.8% were 65 years of age or older. The gender makeup of the village was 48.3% male and 51.7% female.

=== 2000 census ===
As of the census of 2000, there were 293 people, 117 households, and 80 families living in the village. The population density was 1,093.2 inhabitants per square mile (422.1/km^{2}). There were 127 housing units at an average density of 473.8 per square mile (182.9/km^{2}). The racial makeup of the village was 97.95% White, and 2.05% from two or more races.

There were 117 households, out of which 33.3% had children under the age of 18 living with them, 54.7% were married couples living together, 12.0% had a female householder with no husband present, and 30.8% were non-families. 28.2% of all households were made up of individuals, and 14.5% had someone living alone who was 65 years of age or older. The average household size was 2.50 and the average family size was 3.05.

In the village, the population was spread out, with 25.6% under the age of 18, 9.2% from 18 to 24, 27.3% from 25 to 44, 22.5% from 45 to 64, and 15.4% who were 65 years of age or older. The median age was 33 years. For every 100 females, there were 82.0 males. For every 100 females age 18 and over, there were 77.2 males.

The median income for a household in the village was $35,000, and the median income for a family was $39,464. Males had a median income of $35,417 versus $20,536 for females. The per capita income for the village was $14,905. About 11.4% of families and 10.2% of the population were below the poverty line, including 16.3% of those under the age of eighteen and 26.3% of those 65 or over.
