= Bible Grove, Missouri =

Unincorporated community in Missouri, U.S.

Coordinates: 40°21′10″N 92°18′16″W

Bible Grove is an unincorporated community in Mount Pleasant Township, Scotland County, Missouri, United States.

A post office called Bible Grove was established in 1858, the name was changed to Biblegrove in 1895, and the post office closed in 1908. The community was named for the fact religious services were held outside in a nearby grove during pioneer days.

The historic Bible Grove Consolidated District No. 5 School is located in the town.
