= Bible Grove School =

- Bible Grove Consolidated District #5 School
- U.S. National Register of Historic Places
- Location within Missouri Location within the United States
- Location: South side of Rte T. at Bible Grove, Bible Grove, Missouri
- Coordinates: 40°21′4″N 92°18′8″W
- Area: 5 acres (2.0 ha)
- Built: 1921
- Architect: Salisbury, James T.
- Architectural style: four-over-four schoolhouse
- NRHP reference No.: 00000441
- Added to NRHP: May 5, 2000

Bible Grove Consolidated District #5 School, also known as Bible Grove School, is a historic school building south of Route T. at Bible Grove, Scotland County, Missouri. It was built in 1921, and is a two-story rectangular brick building with a full basement. It measures 36 feet by 48 feet, and has a bellcast roof featuring wide eaves, rows of original windows, a double-leaf entrance with a fanlight. The school closed in 1995.

It was added to the National Register of Historic Places in 2000.
