= Harper School (Harper, Missouri) =

- U.S. National Register of Historic Places
- Location within Missouri Location within the United States
- Location: jct. of MO 82 and MO U, Harper, Missouri
- Coordinates: 38°3′47″N 93°31′4″W
- Area: less than one acre
- Built: c. 1875
- Architectural style: one-room schoolhouse
- NRHP reference No.: 07000751
- Added to NRHP: July 24, 2007

Harper School, also known as Harper Community Building, is a historic one-room school located at Harper, St. Clair County, Missouri. It was built about 1875, and is a one-story, one-room frame schoolhouse with twin entrances. It measures 20 feet wide by 32 feet long and has a gable roof with shed roof porch. Also on the property is a contributing frame privy (1935). The school closed in 1952 and houses a community centre.

It was added to the National Register of Historic Places in 2007.
