= 2010 New Year's Eve tornado outbreak =

2010 windstorm in the midwestern and southern United States

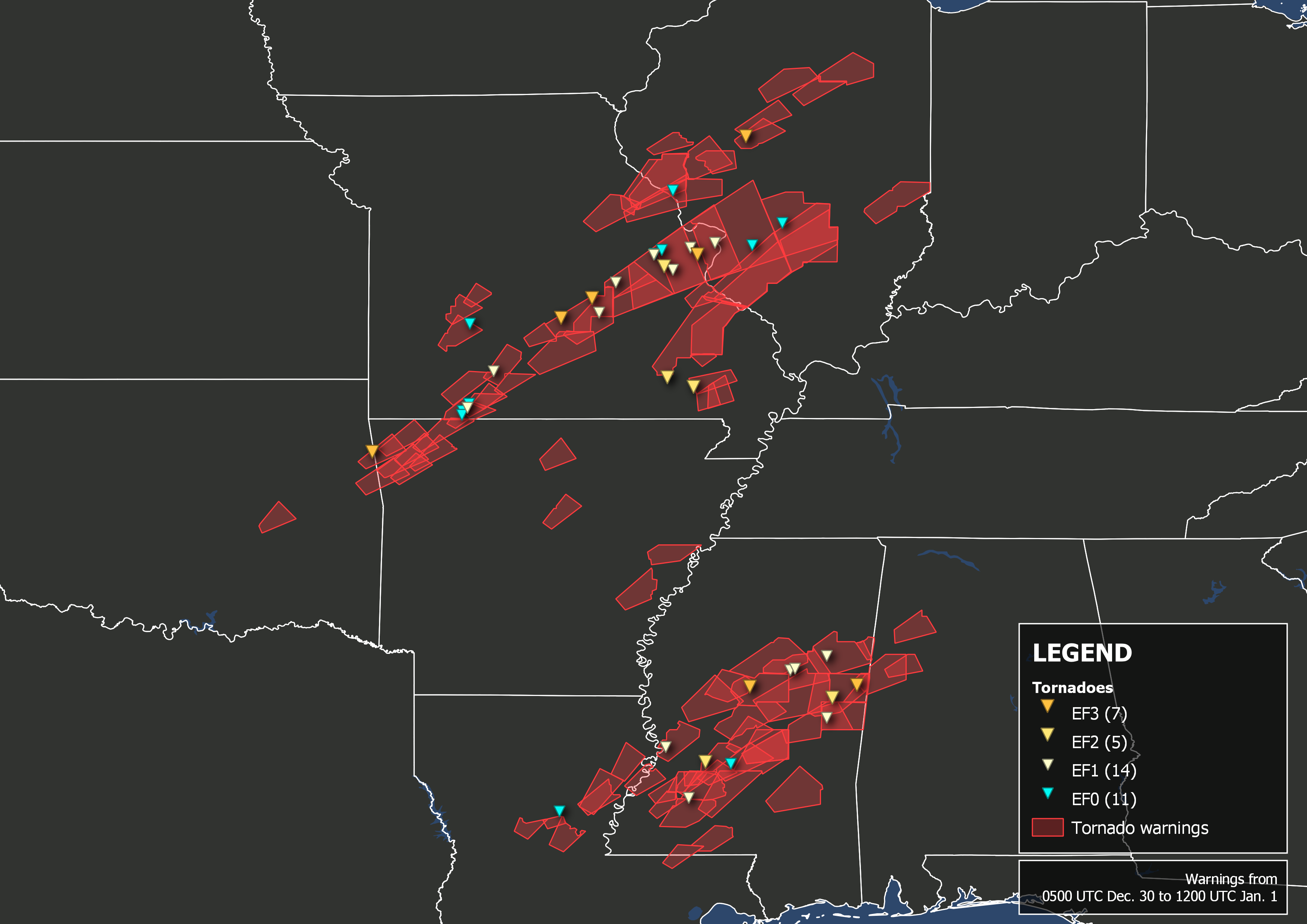
- Plot of all tornado touchdowns during the outbreak

Meteorological history
- Duration: December 30, 2010–January 1, 2011

Tornado outbreak
- Tornadoes: 37
- Max. rating: EF3 tornado
- Duration: 27 hours, 50 minutes
- Highest winds: Tornadic – 150 mph (240 km/h) (Fenton, Missouri EF3 on December 31)
- Highest gusts: Non-tornadic – 80 mph (130 km/h) (8 locations on December 31)
- Largest hail: 2.75 in (7.0 cm) in diameter (NNE of Mansfield on December 31)

Overall effects
- Fatalities: 9
- Injuries: 32
- Damage: $136.98 million (2010 USD)
- Areas affected: Arkansas, Oklahoma, Missouri, Illinois, Louisiana, Mississippi
- Part of the tornado outbreaks of 2010 and tornado outbreaks of 2011

A destructive and deadly three-day-long tornado outbreak impacted the central and lower Mississippi Valley from December 30, 2010, to January 1, 2011. Associated with a low pressure system and a strong cold front, 37 tornadoes tracked across five states over the length of the severe event, killing nine and injuring several others. Activity was centered in the states of Missouri and later Mississippi on December 31. Seven tornadoes were rated EF3 on the Enhanced Fujita Scale; these were the strongest during the outbreak. Non-tornadic winds were recorded to have reached as high as 80 mph (130 km/h) at eight locations on December 31, while hail as large as 2.75 in (7.0 cm) was documented north-northeast of Mansfield, Missouri. Damage estimates from the outbreak totaled US$136.98 million. This is the most prolific tornado outbreak in Missouri in the month of December.

The United States Storm Prediction Center first noted a possible New Year's Eve severe weather event as early as December 25, 2010. These forecasts gained confidence as the event approached, with a focus on the Ozarks and adjacent areas. Supercells developed in this area during the night of December 30 and tracked across central Missouri, producing several tornadoes and large hail. However, the bulk of activity during the outbreak was a result of a long line of supercells that tracked from Oklahoma to Illinois, producing five EF3 tornadoes. One of these tracked through northwestern Arkansas, killing four. Another tore through eastern sections of Fort Leonard Wood in Missouri, destroying 159 homes and causing US$90 million in damage, making it the costliest tornado of the outbreak. A separate cluster of storms later developed in Louisiana before tracking into Mississippi, producing several tornadoes across southern and central regions of the state on January 1.

== Meteorological synopsis ==
The Storm Prediction Center (SPC) began to note the possibility that a severe weather event could develop on December 30 as early as December 25, 2010. Nonetheless, the predictability of the event was too low as the event was several days out. As the anticipated event grew closer, confidence in the forecast slowly increased, though uncertainties in the timing and extent of the tornado outbreak still existed. These uncertainties remained through December 29 with forecasts calling for only marginal hail and possibly damaging gusts. However, the SPC indicated that discrete tornadic supercells and more severe thunderstorms could result from atmospheric conditions deviating slightly from the forecast. In contrast, forecasts were more confident in a widespread outbreak of severe weather for New Year's Eve; the SPC issued a slight risk outlook for much of the Lower Mississippi Valley and the Ozarks as a result.

Atmospheric conditions remained only marginally conducive for the development of thunderstorms on the morning of December 30. Throughout the day, moisture was drawn from the Gulf of Mexico northward into the Ozarks region. However, the presence of a capping inversion prevented thunderstorms from developing. During the evening of December 30, an area of strong wind shear developed near the Ark-La-Tex and southeastern Oklahoma area well ahead of a nearing cold front, providing a focal point for potential storm development. Late that day, scattered thunderstorms developed over eastern Oklahoma and northern Arkansas, producing significant hail. Over the next few hours and into December 31, these storms would intensify as they moved into southwestern Missouri, producing four tornadoes. The first tornado watch issued in association with the severe event was issued at 07:06 UTC on December 31 as these storms tracked across the Ozarks. After a few hours, these supercell thunderstorms lessened in strength as they neared the Greater St. Louis metropolitan area.

The Fort Leonard Wood EF3 tornado seen from the military base

While the cluster of thunderstorms was tracking through Missouri, a new squall line with embedded supercells developed across eastern Oklahoma and Kansas, demarcating a dry line boundary. Although linear storm systems tend to indicate strong wind events and not tornadoes, these storms tracked eastward into southwestern Missouri and eventually produced several tornadoes. A long-tracked EF3 developed from one of these supercells and struck Cincinnati, Arkansas. At 13:31 UTC on December 31, a tornado watch was issued for much of Missouri and portions of Arkansas and Illinois. Most of the tornadoes during the outbreak stemmed from this line of storms as they moved through Missouri and Illinois throughout the day. At around noon, a new cluster of disorganized showers formed over eastern Louisiana and southern Mississippi. Although these storms were initially weak, they gradually intensified into supercells as the day went on. Additional supercells quickly developed over Louisiana and eventually spread in coverage over Mississippi, resulting in the development of several tornadoes. Reaching their peak strength over Mississippi, the storms gradually lost their intensity as they tracked eastward late on December 31 and into January 1, 2011. By the morning hours of January 1, severe activity had become restricted to the Florida Panhandle and southern Alabama; the last tornado watch issued in association with the 2010 New Year's Eve tornado outbreak was issued for those regions at 15:56 UTC that day.

== Confirmed tornadoes ==
Confirmed tornadoes by Enhanced Fujita rating
EFU	EF0	EF1	EF2	EF3	EF4	EF5	Total
0	11	14	5	7	0	0	37

=== December 30 event ===
List of confirmed tornadoes – Thursday, December 30, 2010
EF#	Location	County / Parish	State	Start Coord.	Time (UTC)	Path length	Max width
EF0	NW of Blue Eye	Stone	MO	36.5254°N 93.4262°W	05:19–05:24	0.25 mi (0.40 km)	30 yd (27 m)
EF0	A framed home and a mobile home both sustained minor damage. Additional damage was inflicted upon two large farm gas tanks, a stock trailer, and an outbuilding.						
EF1	E of Lampe to S of Notch	Stone	MO	36.5706°N 93.3742°W	05:26–05:40	3.15 mi (5.07 km)	300 yd (270 m)
EF1	A tornado tracked along the shoreline of a peninsula within Table Rock Lake, damaging or destroying 11 boat docks. Within these docks, 25 boats sustained damage. Around sixty homes suffered minor to moderate roof damage, though one well-built home was unroofed.						

=== December 31 event ===
List of confirmed tornadoes – Friday, December 31, 2010
EF#	Location	County / Parish	State	Start Coord.	Time (UTC)	Path length	Max width
EF1	Indian Point	Stone	MO	36.616°N 93.3498°W	06:17–06:22	1.75 mi (2.82 km)	75 yd (69 m)
EF1	A few houses were impacted, and approximately six boat docks and four boats were damaged.						
EF1	W of Bruner to NW of Olga	Christian, Webster	MO	37.0283°N 93.0351°W	06:18–06:38	8.37 mi (13.47 km)	250 yd (230 m)
EF1	A trailer home was rotated and displaced 150 yd (140 m). The roof of a barn was removed, and several of its walls collapsed. Numerous trees were snapped and uprooted, and numerous outbuildings were damaged or destroyed. Two people were injured.						
EF3	NNE of Westville, OK to Cincinnati, AR to northwestern Tontitown, AR	Adair (OK), Washington (AR), Benton (AR)	OK, AR	35.9977°N 94.5655°W	12:05–12:27	21.1 mi (34.0 km)	500 yd (460 m)
EF3	4 deaths – See section on this tornado – There were 10 injuries.						
EF0	NNW of Oak Grove, AR to N of Blue Eye, MO	Carroll (AR), Stone (MO)	AR, MO	36.4794°N 93.4399°W	13:48–13:57	4.25 mi (6.84 km)	50 yd (46 m)
EF0	Barns were damaged, a carport at a residence was destroyed, and several trees were damaged or blown down.						
EF0	NNW of Burns to SSE of Violet	Polk	MO	37.631°N 93.3362°W	14:37–14:41	1 mi (1.6 km)	50 yd (46 m)
EF0	Three structures sustained minor damage, including a home that had a portion of its roof removed.						
EF3	Fort Leonard Wood	Pulaski	MO	37.6857°N 92.1901°W	15:43–16:03	7.5 mi (12.1 km)	500 yd (460 m)
EF3	A total of 159 homes were damaged, of which 41 were completely destroyed and 32 sustained significant damage. Extensive to moderate damage was inflicted on several military training areas and installation utility systems, while extensive damage occurred in one installation family housing area. The second level of a water treatment plant on the base was removed, and the tornado disrupted the power supply system, shut off the water system, and damaged gas lines. Four people were injured.						
EF3	Rolla to WNW of Flag Spring	Phelps	MO	37.9394°N 91.8018°W	16:06–16:26	11 mi (18 km)	500 yd (460 m)
EF3	2 deaths – Two single-wide mobile homes were destroyed, with debris thrown upstream; two fatalities occurred in one of the homes. A two-story home was completely destroyed, save for its interior walls, and a car was thrown over it. Several other cars were thrown, and minor to moderate roof and tree damage was observed at various locations. Six people were injured.						
EF1	ESE of Lecoma to NW of Seaton	Dent, Phelps	MO	37.7748°N 91.7129°W	16:12–16:16	6.78 mi (10.91 km)	440 yd (400 m)
EF1	2 deaths – Several structures sustained significant damage or were destroyed, including a mobile home near the beginning of the path where two fatalities occurred. Several trees were downed, and power lines were damaged.						
EF1	SE of Jake Prairie to SE of Oak Hill	Crawford	MO	38.1471°N 91.4952°W	16:40–16:46	6.36 mi (10.24 km)	100 yd (91 m)
EF1	Numerous trees were snapped or uprooted, and a home and several farmsteads were damaged.						
EF1	E of Krakow	Franklin	MO	38.5003°N 91.0222°W	17:16–17:18	0.8 mi (1.3 km)	100 yd (91 m)
EF1	On a horse farm, a metal pole barn lost a majority of its roof, an outbuilding sustained roof damage, and a residence lost some shingles. A 35 ft (11 m) radio tower was blown over. Minor tree damage was observed.						
EF0	ENE of Krakow	Franklin	MO	38.5059°N 91.0123°W	17:17–17:18	0.36 mi (0.58 km)	50 yd (46 m)
EF0	A home sustained minor trim damage, trees were downed, and a road sign was blown over.						
EF2	S of Moselle to SE of Pacific	Franklin, Jefferson	MO	38.3399°N 90.8899°W	17:19–17:33	12.19 mi (19.62 km)	370 yd (340 m)
EF2	Over two dozen structures were damaged, including a home and a building that were completely destroyed, and extensive tree damage was observed. A church sustained severe damage to its west-facing wall, and an old church sanctuary was completely leveled.						
EF0	W of Augusta	St. Charles	MO	38.5631°N 90.9232°W	17:25–17:28	1.96 mi (3.15 km)	50 yd (46 m)
EF0	A barn was knocked down, with a portion of its roof tossed across the road. A house sustained minor exterior damage, a portion of the roof to an outbuilding was removed, and a tree was uprooted.						
EF1	ESE of Lonedell to NW of Cedar Hill	Franklin, Jefferson	MO	38.3067°N 90.7819°W	17:27–17:35	8.6 mi (13.8 km)	50 yd (46 m)
EF1	Several trees were snapped or uprooted, and a barn sustained moderate roof damage.						
EF3	Eastern Murphy to Fenton to Crestwood	Jefferson, St. Louis	MO	38.4918°N 90.4706°W	17:48–18:00	6.65 mi (10.70 km)	440 yd (400 m)
EF3	1 death – See section on this tornado – Six people were injured.						
EF1	Ballwin	St. Louis	MO	38.5935°N 90.5559°W	17:48–17:50	1.7 mi (2.7 km)	175 yd (160 m)
EF1	Nearly three dozen homes sustained minor damage, and numerous trees were snapped or uprooted.						
EF0	WNW of Mozier to E of Belleview	Calhoun	IL	39.3114°N 90.7808°W	17:56–17:59	3.64 mi (5.86 km)	50 yd (46 m)
EF0	Trees were uprooted.						
EF1	St. Louis	City of St. Louis	MO	38.6494°N 90.2537°W	18:08–18:11	2.71 mi (4.36 km)	100 yd (91 m)
EF1	Numerous homes sustained roof damage.						
EF0	NNE of Lebanon	St. Clair	IL	38.6247°N 89.7812°W	18:30–18:31	0.14 mi (0.23 km)	50 yd (46 m)
EF0	A few outbuildings and trees on a farmstead were damaged.						
EF3	S of Petersburg	Menard	IL	39.9842°N 89.862°W	18:37–18:40	3.63 mi (5.84 km)	200 yd (180 m)
EF3	Nearly one hundred homes and a nursing home sustained minor damage. A total of 29 homes sustained significant damage, four were beyond repair, and two barns were destroyed. One person was seriously injured when a large tree limb fell on their car.						
EF0	Northern Greenville to SSW of Durley	Bond	IL	38.9006°N 89.3979°W	19:05–19:07	1.74 mi (2.80 km)	100 yd (91 m)
EF0	An agricultural building sustained roof damage, several houses sustained minor roof and siding damage, and tree damage was observed.						
EF2	E of Chilton to NW of Ellsinore	Carter	MO	36.9407°N 90.8514°W	19:24–19:30	2.63 mi (4.23 km)	200 yd (180 m)
EF2	The tin roof was pulled off an outbuilding. A home sustained partial roof and wall collapse, a mobile home was blown 15 ft (4.6 m) off its foundation, and over 100 trees were uprooted. A shed and some outbuildings were destroyed, while a twin-pole high voltage transmission tower was partially blown over. A sawmill was destroyed, part of the roof of a metal barn was blown into trees, vehicles were damaged, and another home sustained minor roof damage.						
EF2	NNE of Stringtown	Butler	MO	36.8186°N 90.523°W	20:25–20:26	0.24 mi (0.39 km)	100 yd (91 m)
EF2	A well-built residence lost about one-third of its roof, several trees were snapped or uprooted, shingles were ripped off a small shed, an antenna tower was damaged, and fences were damaged.						
EF0	NW of Deville	LaSalle	LA	31.4846°N 92.2055°W	20:35–20:36	0.38 mi (0.61 km)	50 yd (46 m)
EF0	A few trees were snapped, the front porch was removed from a trailer house, damaging a portion of the roof, and tin sheets were removed from a nearby barn.						
EF1	Eastern Vicksburg to SE of Beechwood	Warren	MS	32.2939°N 90.8702°W	22:11–22:15	3.56 mi (5.73 km)	100 yd (91 m)
EF1	Shingles were blown off several roofs, a hangar lost a portion of its roof, a mobile home was damaged, and a power pole was snapped. A few trees were blown down.						
EF2	W of Terry to Byram to eastern Flowood	Hinds, Rankin	MS	32.0868°N 90.3663°W	22:44–23:25	26.17 mi (42.12 km)	800 yd (730 m)
EF2	This strong, long-track tornado initially knocked down a few trees and caused minor structural damage, including damage to shingles on roofs. The tornado eventually paralleled I-55 before entering Byram. In town, numerous structures were damaged, dozens of billboards were blown out, and a tanker truck was overturned. Numerous power poles and trees were also snapped. The tornado did similar damage to a lesser degree in southern Jackson before crossing the Pearl River into Richland. The tornado only did tree damage in town before moving into Pearl and damaging the roofs of a movie theater and a Kroger. The roof was also completely torn off of a car wash. In neighborhoods, numerous trees were knocked down, with several of those trees falling onto houses, some of which became total losses. The tornado then struck Jackson–Medgar Wiley Evers International Airport, passing just south of the terminal. A roof was heavily damaged at a warehouse, and several trees were downed. The tornado continued in eastern Flowood, damaging more trees before lifting.						
EF0	S of Star	Rankin	MS	32.0824°N 90.0529°W	23:42–23:45	1.38 mi (2.22 km)	50 yd (46 m)
EF0	Multiple tree limbs and a few trees were downed.						
EF1	E of Caseyville	Lincoln	MS	32.0824°N 90.0529°W	02:09–02:13	2.12 mi (3.41 km)	50 yd (46 m)
EF1	Numerous trees were snapped or uprooted. An outbuilding was destroyed, and several others were heavily damaged. One house lost a few of its shingles, while another home had its windows blown out, sustained shingle damage, and was shifted off its blocks.						

=== January 1 event ===
List of confirmed tornadoes – Saturday, January 1, 2011
EF#	Location	County / Parish	State	Start Coord.	Time (UTC)	Path length	Max width
EF3	SE of Durant to N of Ethel	Attala	MS	33.0394°N 89.8123°W	06:02–06:26	23.45 mi (37.74 km)	1,300 yd (1,200 m)
EF3	Thousands of trees were snapped or uprooted. At a church complex, the main church's roof was heavily damaged and several camp buildings were destroyed. A number of outbuildings were destroyed, significant roof damage was inflicted to several residences, and several vehicles were damaged.						
EF1	Weir	Choctaw	MS	33.2625°N 89.2957°W	06:40–06:41	0.61 mi (0.98 km)	75 yd (69 m)
EF1	Several large trees were snapped, one of which fell on a house, severely damaging its roof. Minor damage was inflicted to several mobile homes and a church, and the roof was blown off a shed.						
EF1	ENE of Weir to SE of Ackerman	Choctaw	MS	33.2839°N 89.24°W	06:46–06:53	6.52 mi (10.49 km)	75 yd (69 m)
EF1	A number of trees were snapped and uprooted, and a couple of small outbuildings sustained roof damage.						
EF1	Starkville	Oktibbeha	MS	33.4386°N 88.8419°W	07:15–07:18	1.29 mi (2.08 km)	250 yd (230 m)
EF1	The roof of a metal commercial building was pulled back and its overhead door was blown in. A number of soccer goals and dugouts were blown over and some fencing was damaged. The entire roofing structure of one apartment building was removed, the façade was blown off another building, and several other structures suffered shingle or fascia damage. Part of a roof of a carwash was blown off, a church sustained gutter damage, and some power lines and several trees were downed.						
EF2	ENE of Preston to E of Gholson	Kemper, Noxubee	MS	32.9012°N 88.7666°W	08:00–08:09	6.07 mi (9.77 km)	860 yd (790 m)
EF2	Numerous trees were snapped and uprooted. The roof and some walls were removed from one home, while several others sustained roof and window damage as well. Two outbuildings, a shed, and a well-built garage were destroyed, while several others were severely damaged.						
EF3	SE of Macon to W of Memphis, AL	Noxubee	MS	33.0609°N 88.464°W	08:25–08:41	9.63 mi (15.50 km)	1,330 yd (1,220 m)
EF3	Numerous trees were snapped or uprooted, with one completely debarked, and several power poles were snapped. A barn, milk house, silo, and mobile home were completely destroyed on a dairy farm. A metal farm building and an office were destroyed, while an 18-wheeler was pushed approximately 25 yards (23 m). The second story of a house, a barn, and some metal buildings at a pig farm were destroyed, and a pivot was overturned. Other homes sustained roof damage.						
EF1	SW of Moscow to SW of De Kalb	Kemper	MS	32.6646°N 88.8355°W	08:56–09:09	11.06 mi (17.80 km)	440 yd (400 m)
EF1	The roof was blown off a wood-frame home and several others sustained minor shingle damage. Numerous outbuildings were severely damaged or destroyed, and numerous trees were snapped or uprooted.						

=== Westville, Oklahoma/Cincinnati, Arkansas ===
Westville, Oklahoma/Cincinnati, Arkansas
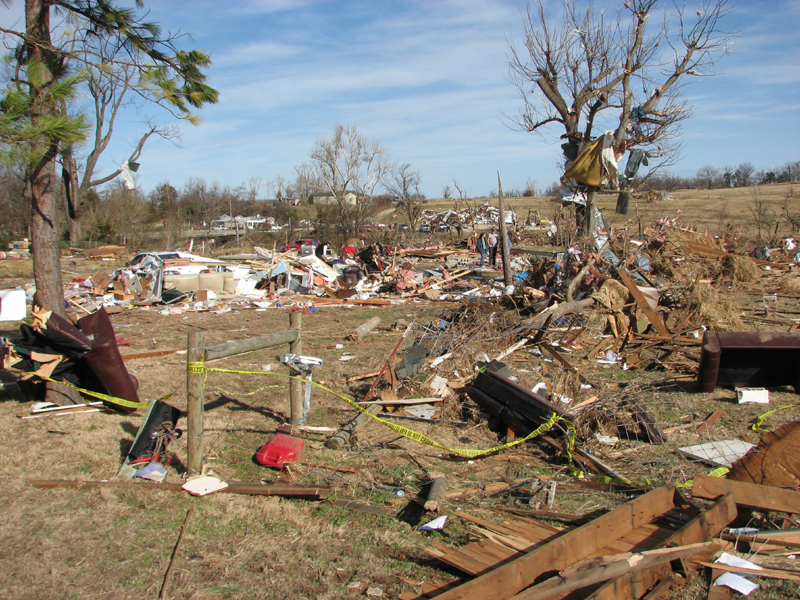
- Damage in Cincinnati, Arkansas

Meteorological history
- Formed: December 31, 2010, 6:05 a.m. CST (UTC–04:00)
- Dissipated: December 31, 2010, 6:27 a.m. CST (UTC–04:00)
- Duration: 22 minutes

EF3 tornado
- on the Enhanced Fujita scale
- Highest winds: 142 mph (229 km/h)

Overall effects
- Fatalities: 4
- Injuries: 10
- Damage: $1.835 million (2010 USD)

The deadliest tornado of the 2010 New Year's Eve tornado outbreak moved across extreme eastern Oklahoma and northwestern Arkansas, tracking 21.1 mi (34.0 km) and damaging the unincorporated community of Cincinnati, Arkansas. The first tornado warning associated was issued at 12:00 UTC for portions of Adair County in Oklahoma and Benton and Washington counties in Arkansas by the National Weather Service Tulsa, Oklahoma. At around the same time, damaging winds estimated at 70 mph (110 km/h) tore the roof off of a barn southwest of Westville, Oklahoma; these winds were likely a result of inflow caused by the developing tornado. Post-tornado survey teams concluded that the tornado touched down five minutes later northeast of Westville. Quickly tracking northeast, the tornado snapped 13 large wooden utility poles. Four cars were displaced by 20–50 yd (18–46 m), and a nearby home sustained significant roof damage and broken windows; this resulted in an EF2 rating for the tornado within Adair County. Damage in Adair County totaled $60,000. At 12:08 UTC, the tornado crossed the Oklahoma-Arkansas border and moved into Benton County, Arkansas.

At 12:10 UTC, the tornado tracked into Cincinnati, where it reached its peak intensity. Winds were estimated as high as 142 mph (229 km/h), making the tornado a low-end EF3 at this location, and the tornado widened to a width of 300 yd (270 m). Several homes were destroyed or heavily damaged in the southwestern areas of the town. Numerous trees and power poles were knocked down or uprooted. Two people were killed when a mobile home was destroyed, while another person died as he was tending cattle when the barn he occupied collapsed. Seven others were injured in Cincinnati. The tornado continued to widen as it trekked northeastward, reaching a maximum width of 500 yd (460 m). Several permanent homes were heavily damaged northeast of Cincinnati, and a number of chicken houses, mobile homes, outbuildings, and power poles were destroyed. One woman was critically injured after her mobile home was destroyed; she died of her injuries at a hospital four days later. Damage in Cincinnati and surrounding areas within Benton County reached $1.5 million.

After passing near Weddington at around 12:17 UTC, the tornado crossed over the Benton–Washington county line four times as it continued northeastward. Permanent houses were damaged, mobile homes were destroyed, numerous trees were uprooted or snapped, and many other power poles were snapped. Two people were injured following the destruction of a mobile home within the Ozark National Forest in Benton County, while another person was injured west of Tonitown in Washington County. The tornado finally dissipated northwest of Tontitown at 12:27 UTC after causing four deaths and 10 injuries. Overall, the tornado caused $1.835 million in damage, which was the sixth costliest total during the tornado outbreak.

=== Fenton–Sunset Hills, Missouri ===
Fenton–Sunset Hills, Missouri
Meteorological history
- Formed: December 31, 2010, 11:48 a.m. CST (UTC–04:00)
- Dissipated: December 31, 2010, 12:00 p.m. CST (UTC–04:00)
- Duration: 12 minutes

EF3 tornado
- on the Enhanced Fujita scale
- Highest winds: 150 mph (240 km/h)

Overall effects
- Fatalities: 1
- Injuries: 6
- Damage: $1 million (2010 USD)

At 17:22 UTC on December 31, the National Weather Service St. Louis, Missouri issued a tornado warning for a severe squall line capable of producing rain-wrapped tornadoes and wind damage. The warning covered ten counties in Missouri and Illinois straddling the Mississippi River and included St. Louis. Shortly after the warning's issuance, two EF1 tornadoes tracked across Jefferson and St. Louis counties, causing extensive tree damage and minor property damage. However, the most destructive tornado from the passing squall line touched down at 17:48 UTC east-northeast of Murphy, Missouri in northern Jefferson County. Initially, the tornado was an EF0 with a path width of 40 yd (37 m) and lifted before touching down again just north of Route 30 near the Jefferson-St. Louis county line. Small trees and minor roof damage occurred at the point of this second touch down before the tornado moved northeastward into St. Louis County, where the tornado caused a bulk of its damage and was at its strongest.

A large subdivision near Route 30 sustained minor roof and tree damage, which was rated as EF0 intensity. However, as the tornado was intensifying through the neighborhood, three homes to the subdivision's east suffered more considerable roof and siding damage and was assigned an EF1 damage intensity rating. The tornado then crossed Route 141, where it blew a Honda CR-V into a highway barrier; the driver of the vehicle suffered critical injuries and died 11 days later from those injuries. After crossing the highway, a number of buildings were damaged including a church, elementary school, and parsonage. Damage in this area was rated as EF2 due to the partial debarking of a nearby tree. Minor tree damage occurred as the tornado moved through Fenton Park and tracked over the Meramec River.

After crossing the river, the tornado weakened to EF1 strength, damaging several homes while also leaving behind an interrupted damage path. The tornado crossed I-270 before rapidly intensifying at around 17:56 UTC. Numerous trees were uprooted while many homes sustained considerable damage. Six homes were unroofed and one was destroyed and shifted from its foundation; this damage was rated high-end EF3. At the time, the tornado was 0.25 mi (0.40 km) wide. The tornado weakened to EF1 intensity afterwards, causing more minor damage to a strip mall and several homes. Six power poles were knocked down shortly before the tornado lifted at 18:00 UTC in western Crestwood, Missouri.

== Non-tornadic impacts ==
Beginning on December 29 and continuing for three days, the storm system associated with the tornado outbreak caused strong winds across the Texas Panhandle and eastern New Mexico. The winds were further enhanced by isolated showers, and gusts peaked at 79 mph (127 km/h) in Tatum, New Mexico. Approximately 7 mi (11 km) west of Levelland, Texas, the winds downed four power poles, sparking a fire that burned nearly 2,000 acres (810 hectares) of grassland before it was finally contained; the fire caused US$20,000 in damage. In Allen, Oklahoma, strong winds associated with one supercell caused an estimated US$20,000 in damage after damaging the carport, chimney, and roof of a house. Hail and strong winds were also reported elsewhere in eastern Oklahoma and southeastern Kansas. Widespread and damaging wind gusts and hail later crossed into northwestern Arkansas, causing US$175,000 in damage. Several buildings and homes were destroyed by the strong winds; similar impacts were seen in Missouri and Illinois.

In Mississippi, rainfall totals between 1–4 in (25–102 mm) were widespread. The highest precipitation total was 5.58 in (142 mm) south of Grace, Mississippi. In Scott County, residents were forced to evacuate out of Forest and Morton due to flash floods that caused $470,000 in damage. Similarly, the inundation washed out roads and flooded cars in Winona. Overall, flood damage in Mississippi amounted to US$1.135 million.

== See also ==
- List of North American tornadoes and tornado outbreaks
- List of United States tornadoes from November to December 2010
- List of United States tornadoes from January to March 2011
- Tornado outbreak of March 13–16, 2025 – Another tornado outbreak of a more destructive scale impacted the same areas
