= Gourd Creek Cave =

Archaeological site in Phelps County, Missouri

Coordinates: 37°49′36″N 91°51′28″W

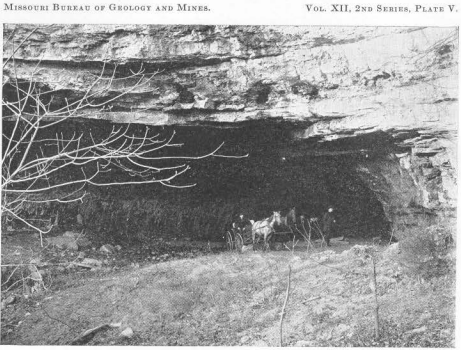
Gourd Creek Cave entrance, 1913

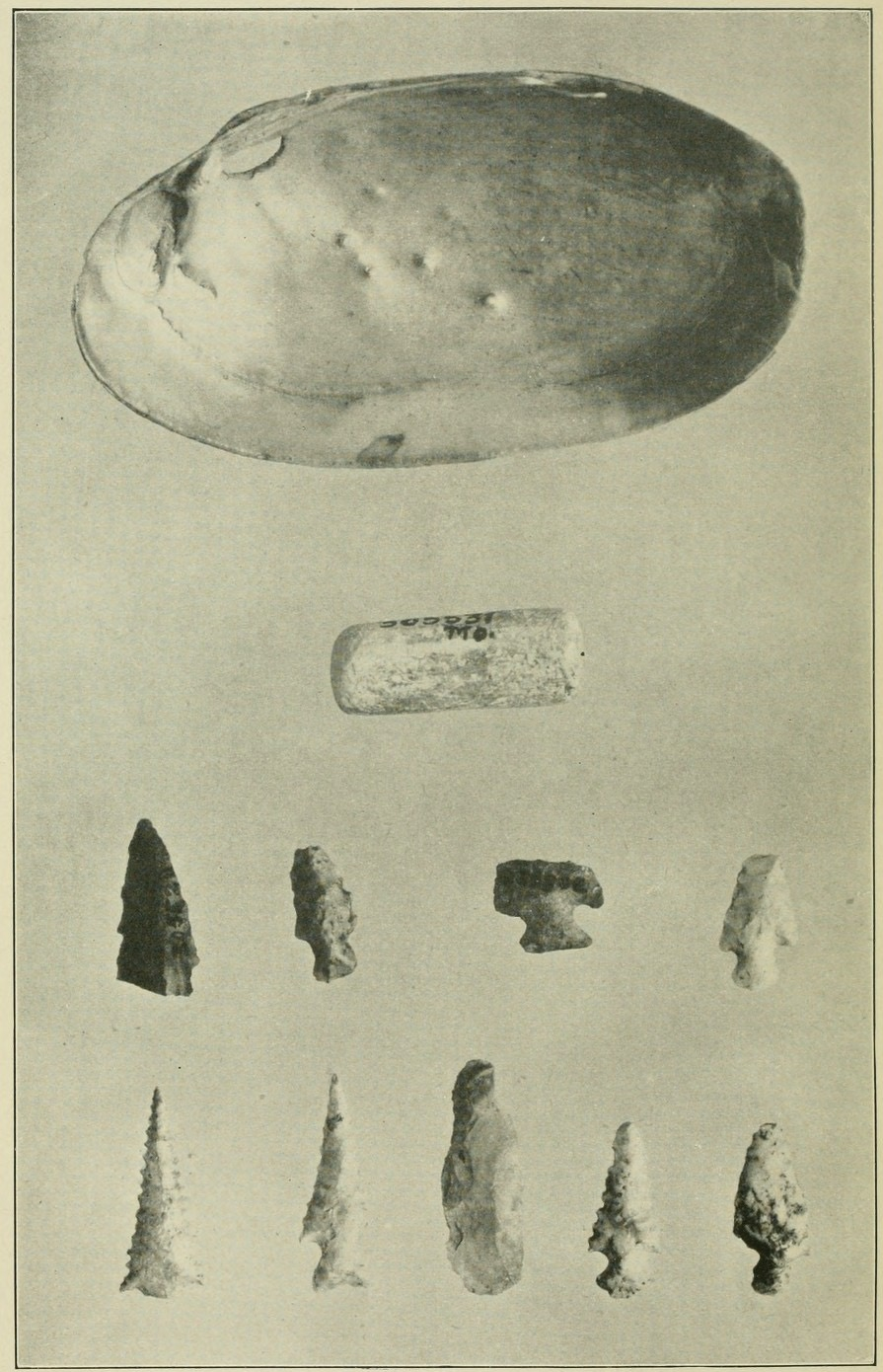
Shell and flint objects from Ground Creek Cave, 1922

The Gourd Creek Cave is an archaeological site in Phelps County in the Ozarks of Missouri, United States. It lies just northeast of the confluence of Gourd Creek with Little Piney Creek, approximately 12 mi (19 km) southwest of Rolla, the seat of Phelps County. In 1969 the cave was inducted into the National Register of Historic Places in Phelps County.

A 1957 Catalogue of the Caves Of Missouri gives the location of the cave as SE SE NW sec. 19, T. 36 N., R. 8 W. in the quadrangle identified by Yancy Mills.

== Description ==
In 1922 Gerard Fowke published a report about excavation at this location, with a detailed description of the cave. Fowke noted that the integrity of the site was disrupted by treasure seekers due to a firm belief among the locals that the last survivor of an exterminated Native American tribe had hidden several "pony loads" of gold there.

The local historian John Bradbury in "A Social History of Some Phelps and Pulaski County Caves" (2015) writes on how the cave was used for social gatherings since late 19th century, after the development of iron mines in the vicinity and mentions that newspaper items about the cave started appearing in 1870s.

At the time of Gerard Fowke it was privately owned and still is.

Wallace Lee of the Missouri Bureau of Geology and Mines gives the following brief description:

The mouth of the cave, which is 100 feet wide and 22 feet high, occurs near the foot of a bluff and is the opening to a chamber 185 feet long. A short bend at the back of this cavern unites it with a tapering gallery which may be followed about 400 feet. The passage continues still farther in a tight wedge-shaped channel about 18 inches high. The gallery conveys a perennial stream of water and is clearly an. enlarged joint but the great chamber at the mouth of the cave presents a smooth unbroken roof and it is evident that the opening which permitted the deflection of the water from the gallery to the cave proper did not extend upward in.to the overlying beds. A smaller joint crosses the gallery diagonally and its enlargement forms two short branches in the passage. The cave is a favorite resort for picnics and it is possible to drive a wagon directly into it. It is said to have been a favorite resort of Indians in former times. Near the mouth two to four feet of wood ashes, in which skulls and bones are reported to have been found, cover about one-sixth of the floor of the great chamber.
