= Arlington, Missouri =

Unincorporated community in the US state of Missouri

Coordinates: 37°55′13″N 91°58′16″W

Arlington is an unincorporated community in western Phelps County, Missouri, United States. The community is located just northeast of the confluence of Little Piney Creek and the Gasconade River. I-44 passes just to the east and the Burlington Northern Railroad passes the south edge of the community. The community of Jerome lies approximately three-quarters of a mile to the northwest across the Gasconade.

== History ==
Arlington was originally called Little Piney. At times troops from the 5th Missouri State Militia Cavalry garrisoned there. Originally settled by Thomas Harrison and James Harrison and later established as a township by General Fremont circa 1867, the town was renamed for the former Robert E. Lee plantation (later a cemetery) at Arlington, Virginia, Folk etymology maintains the name honors Arlie, the wife of a local merchant. Arlington was once a popular resort served by the Pacific Railroad. Located on the last section of U.S. Route 66 in Missouri to be paved, in 1931, the tiny community served fishermen on the Gasconade and Little Piney Rivers.

Stony Dell Resort capitalised on Route 66 and the nearby Fort Leonard Wood military base to grow in the 1930s and early 1940s from a small group of tourist cabins to a popular oasis which included a stream-fed swimming pool, a restaurant, service station and bus stop, offering tennis, dancing, boating and fishing.

By 1946, the town was in decline due to re-routing of a widened US 66; the town site was purchased that year by R. E. Carney. The original 1923 US 66 road bridge, bypassed when the road was widened to four lanes in 1952, was demolished when Interstate 44 bypassed the town in 1966–1967, leaving the original two-lane US 66 a dead end. Most of the Stony Dell Resort was lost to demolition during freeway construction; the restaurant, archway, the fish pond, the gas, food, and gift store, some of the classic stone work, and a handful of cabins remain, now abandoned. Even the 1952 four lane bridge was demolished and replaced as part of a 2005 alignment of I-44.

There are no remaining businesses in Arlington; the caravan park (Arlington River Resort, 13003 Arlington Road) closed permanently in 2008. The only road access to the townsite is I-44 to Newburg then back on what remains of the original two-lane US 66 roadway (Arlington Outer Road, a dead-end). No longer easily accessed by rail and road, Arlington is now merely a small group of private residences. Arlington is currently composed of more than 20 people; albeit, it is no longer its own township and is now a part of Newburg.
