= Little Piney Creek (Missouri) =

Stream in the United States

Location
- Country: United States
- State: Missouri
- County: Phelps

Physical characteristics
- Mouth: Gasconade River

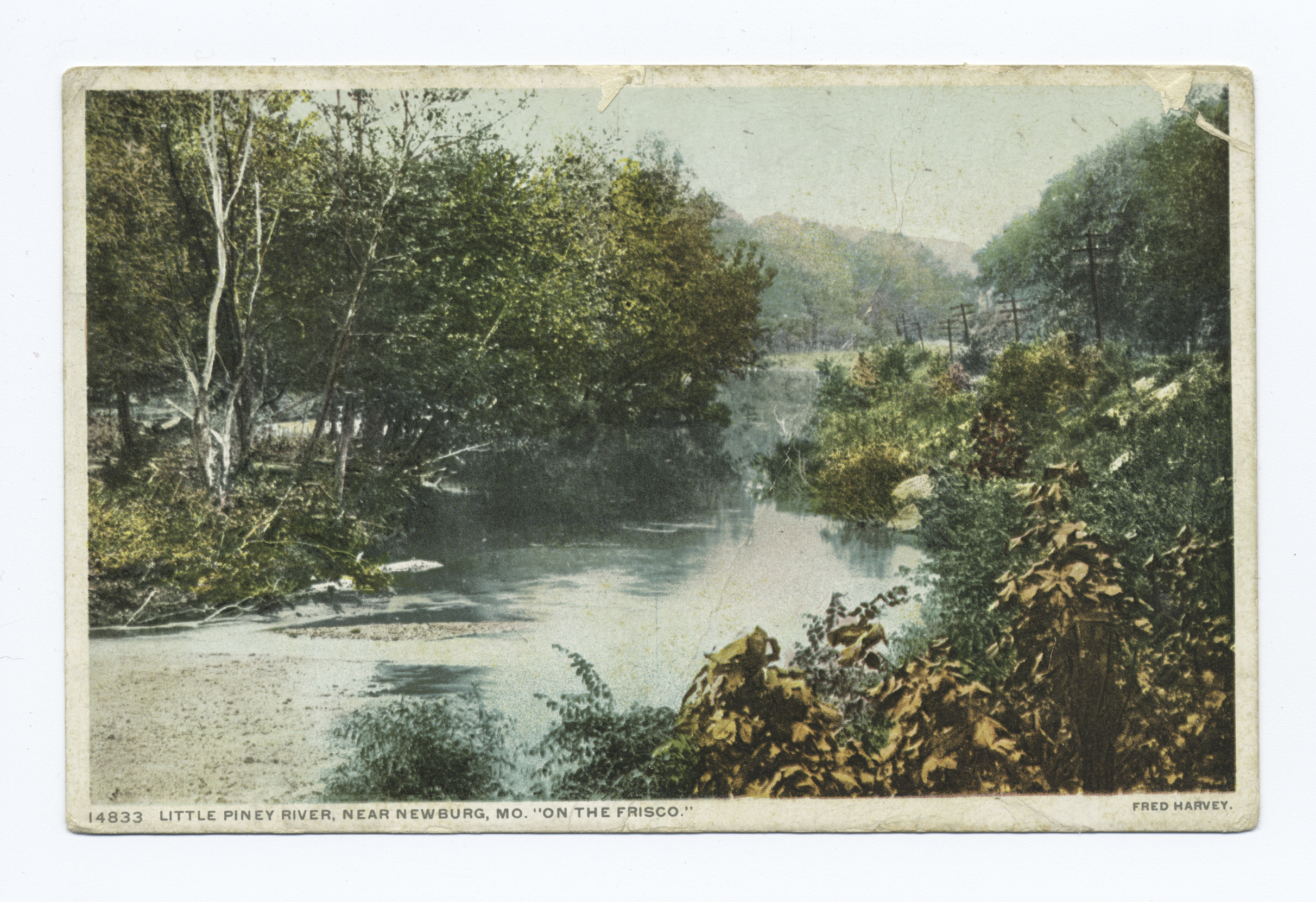
Near Newburg, postcard, early 20th century

Little Piney Creek is a stream in the Phelps, Texas and Dent counties of the Ozarks of southern Missouri. It is a tributary of the Gasconade River.

Coordinates of the stream source are: 37°35′06″N 91°47′29″W and of the confluence with the Gasconade are: 37°55′13″N 91°58′31″W.

The stream headwaters are in northeastern Texas County about one mile southeast of the community of Maples. The stream flows northwest into southeastern Phelps County and flows north parallel to U. S. Route 63 passing just east of the community of Craddock and Edgar Springs. The stream course meanders across the Phelps - Dent County line a few times finally turning northwest and crossing under U.S. 63 at Yancy Mills. The stream meanders north through the Mark Twain National Forest and turns west at the confluence with Beaver Creek. The stream continues to the west passing Newburg and under Interstate 44 to its confluence with the Gasconade River at Jerome.

Little Piney Creek was so named due to an abundance of pine trees near its banks. A 1997 study of the creek found that wooded areas did not have a significantly lower rate of stream bank erosion compared to non-wooded areas.

Fauna of Little Piney Creek include the Ozark sculpin (Cottus hypselurus), which is the only sculpin found in the creek. Fishing in the area requires a permit, and fishing for trout requires an additional trout permit.

== Tributaries ==
Tributaries of Little Piney Creek include:

- Gourd Creek
- Beaver Creek
- Mill Creek

== See also ==
- List of rivers of Missouri
