= Flat, Missouri =

Unincorporated community in Missouri, U.S.

Coordinates: 37°44′43″N 91°55′45″W

Flat is an unincorporated community in southern Phelps County, Missouri, United States. It is located approximately sixteen miles southwest of Rolla. The community is at the intersection of Missouri routes M and T. Edgar Springs lies about four miles to the southeast at the intersection of route M and U.S. Route 63. The headwaters of Mill Creek are just to the east of the community. The village lies within the boundaries of the Mark Twain National Forest.

== History ==
A post office called Flat was established in 1895, and remained in operation until 1967. The community was so named on account of the flat land in a nearby forest.
