= Gourd Creek =

River in Missouri, United States

Gourd Creek is a stream in Phelps County in the Ozarks of Missouri. It is a tributary of Little Piney Creek.

The stream headwaters are just to the east of US Route 63 approximately 1.5 miles south of the community of Vida at 37°50′01″N 91°47′39″W. It flows west-southwest passing under Route 63 and continuing for approximately three miles to its confluence with Little Piney at 37°49′35″N 91°51′30″W about 12 miles southwest of Rolla. It is approximately four miles long, with three or four springs near its source, which keep it from drying around the year.

Gourd Creek was so named on account of wild gourds near its course.

== Archaeology ==
There is the Gourd Creek Cave which lies just northeast of the confluence with Little Piney. In 1969 the cave was inducted into the National Register of Historic Places. In 1922 a small village was reported by the creek near the cave. There also were three earth mounds almost completely levelled down by plowing.

Between the Gourd Creek and the Coal Pit Hollow ravine there is a prominence locally known as Lost Hill, the name shared with several other similar locations in the area. On top of this Lost Hill there are six cairns damaged by treasure hunters led by the beliefs that such piles of stone contain gold hidden by the Native Americans.

== See also ==
- List of rivers of Missouri
