= Elk Prairie =

Elk Prairie may refer to:

- Elk Prairie, California, former name of Fruitland, California
- Elk Prairie Township, Jefferson County, Illinois
- Elk Prairie, Missouri
