= Democrat Ridge =

Ridge in Missouri, U.S.

Coordinates: 37°42′12″N 92°01′24″W

Democrat Ridge is a ridge in Pulaski and Phelps counties in the U.S. state of Missouri. The ridge lies just east of the Big Piney River and Fort Leonard Wood. Missouri Route J traverses the ridge between the communities of Spring Creek and Duke.

Democrat Ridge was named for the fact a large share of the first settlers were Democrats.
