= Asher Hollow =

Valley in Missouri, U.S.

Coordinates: 37°57′18.2″N 91°31′40.6″W

Asher Hollow is a valley in Phelps County, Missouri. It was named for the local Asher family.
