= National Register of Historic Places listings in Phelps County, Missouri =

Location of Phelps County in Missouri

This is a list of the National Register of Historic Places listings in Phelps County, Missouri.

This is intended to be a complete list of the properties and districts on the National Register of Historic Places in Phelps County, Missouri, United States. Latitude and longitude coordinates are provided for many National Register properties and districts; these locations may be seen together in a map.

There are 11 properties and districts listed on the National Register in the county.

This National Park Service list is complete through NPS recent listings posted March 14, 2025.

== Current listings ==
	Name on the Register	Image	Date listed	Location	City or town	Description
1	Community Theater		December 20, 2006 (#06001134)	117 First St. 37°54′52″N 91°54′05″W	Newburg	
2	Gourd Creek Cave Archeological Site		July 29, 1969 (#69000121)	Address Restricted	Newburg	
3	Headquarters, Rolla Division of the Bureau of Mines	Headquarters, Rolla Division of the Bureau of Mines	April 24, 2017 (#100000910)	1300 N. Bishop Ave. 37°57′15″N 91°46′36″W	Rolla	Demolished in 2021
4	Maramec Iron Works District	Maramec Iron Works District	April 16, 1969 (#69000122)	7 miles S of St. James on MO 8; 37°57′21″N 91°32′19″W	St. James	
5	National Bank of Rolla Building	National Bank of Rolla Building	December 28, 2001 (#01001380)	718 Pine St. 37°56′59″N 91°46′16″W	Rolla	
6	Ozark Iron Furnace Stack		June 15, 1970 (#70000345)	2 miles W of Newburg; 37°54′56″N 91°55′52″W	Newburg	
7	Phelps County Courthouse	Phelps County Courthouse	January 7, 1993 (#92001745)	Junction of Third and Main Sts. 37°56′45″N 91°46′22″W	Rolla	
8	Phelps County Jail	Phelps County Jail	May 10, 1990 (#90000766)	Park St. between Second and Third Sts. 37°56′45″N 91°46′27″W	Rolla	
9	Rolla Ranger Station Historic District	Rolla Ranger Station Historic District	August 4, 2003 (#03000717)	Bridge School Road and Kingshighway; 37°56′37″N 91°47′23″W	Rolla	
10	St. James Chapel	St. James Chapel	July 28, 1983 (#83001035)	Church and Meramec Sts. 37°59′38″N 91°36′49″W	St. James	
11	Verkamp Shelter		July 30, 1974 (#74001089)	Address Restricted	St. James	

== See also ==
- List of National Historic Landmarks in Missouri
- National Register of Historic Places listings in Missouri
