= Blooming Rose =

Blooming Rose or Bloomingrose may refer to:

- Blooming Rose, Missouri
- Bloomingrose, West Virginia
