= Doolittle, Missouri =

- City
- Location of Doolittle, Missouri
- Coordinates: 37°56′33″N 91°53′28″W
- Country: United States
- State: Missouri
- County: Phelps
- Established: 1943

Area
  - Total: 2.78 sq mi (7.21 km^{2})
  - Land: 2.78 sq mi (7.21 km^{2})
  - Water: 0 sq mi (0.00 km^{2})
- Elevation: 948 ft (289 m)

Population (2020)
  - Total: 564
  - Density: 202.6/sq mi (78.21/km^{2})
- Time zone: UTC-6 (Central (CST))
  - Summer (DST): UTC-5 (CDT)
- ZIP code: 65550
- Area code: 573
- FIPS code: 29-19828
- GNIS feature ID: 2394547

Doolittle is a city in Phelps County, Missouri, United States. The population was 564 at the 2020 census.

== History ==
The town is named for Lt. General Jimmy Doolittle of World War II fame who bombed Tokyo in a daring raid, which helped to turn the tide of the war in the Pacific. The settlement was originally called Centertown because it was halfway between Rolla and Newburg. This name, coined by a local man named Monroe Ramsey, caught on over the years.

The town boomed in the spring of 1941 when construction of Fort Leonard Wood, 20 miles away, began in earnest due to the war effort. Thousands of workers poured in and slept anywhere they could. In some places, it was said beds never got cold because different shifts shared occupancy. So the two mile stretch which was unofficially called Centertown grew and boomed and a local businessman, Lou Hargis, felt it was time for an incorporated city. The idea of naming the new city after General Doolittle was well-received, along with the idea of having General Doolittle dedicate the town after the war effort.

The original trustees of the town when it was incorporated were Lou Hargis, Mr. Durham (principal of the Newburg High School), Bob Crain (an employee of the Missouri Bureau of Mines, resident of Rolla), and Ike Towell (operator of a local filling station and grocery store). They continued as interim trustees until April 1944 when a general election was held and a mayor and city officials elected. It was those five men who presented themselves at the courthouse "to announce the birth of a town and give it a hero's name."

In 1946, Lt. General Doolittle spoke at the dedication ceremony in which the town was christened in his honor. Doolittle flew his own B-25 into the airport in Vichy, fulfilling a promise he had made two years before.

== Geography ==
Doolittle is located at the intersection of Missouri Route T and I-44 between Rolla and Jerome. Newburg lies approximately 2.5 miles south on Route T.

According to the United States Census Bureau, the city has a total area of 2.68 square miles (6.94 km^{2}), all land.

== Demographics ==
Historical population
| Census | Pop. | Note | %± |
|---|---|---|---|
| 1950 | 237 | | — |
| 1960 | 499 | | 110.5% |
| 1970 | 535 | | 7.2% |
| 1980 | 701 | | 31.0% |
| 1990 | 599 | | −14.6% |
| 2000 | 644 | | 7.5% |
| 2010 | 630 | | −2.2% |
| 2020 | 564 | | −10.5% |
U.S. Decennial Census

=== 2010 census ===
As of the census of 2010, there were 630 people, 251 households, and 184 families living in the city. The population density was 235.1 inhabitants per square mile (90.8/km^{2}). There were 283 housing units at an average density of 105.6 per square mile (40.8/km^{2}). The racial makeup of the city was 97.46% White, 0.63% Native American, 0.32% Asian, and 1.59% from two or more races.

There were 251 households, of which 29.9% had children under the age of 18 living with them, 57.8% were married couples living together, 10.4% had a female householder with no husband present, 5.2% had a male householder with no wife present, and 26.7% were non-families. 20.3% of all households were made up of individuals, and 8.4% had someone living alone who was 65 years of age or older. The average household size was 2.51 and the average family size was 2.88.

The median age in the city was 41.7 years. 23.2% of residents were under the age of 18; 9% were between the ages of 18 and 24; 21.1% were from 25 to 44; 31.1% were from 45 to 64; and 15.6% were 65 years of age or older. The gender makeup of the city was 48.4% male and 51.6% female.

=== 2000 census ===
As of the census of 2000, there were 644 people, 256 households, and 192 families living in the city. The population density was 261.6 inhabitants per square mile (101.0/km^{2}). There were 284 housing units at an average density of 115.4 per square mile (44.6/km^{2}). The racial makeup of the city was 96.43% White, 1.40% Native American, 0.31% Asian, and 1.86% from two or more races.

There were 256 households, out of which 34.8% had children under the age of 18 living with them, 59.0% were married couples living together, 11.7% had a female householder with no husband present, and 25.0% were non-families. 22.3% of all households were made up of individuals, and 10.5% had someone living alone who was 65 years of age or older. The average household size was 2.52 and the average family size was 2.91.

In the city the population was spread out, with 25.5% under the age of 18, 9.0% from 18 to 24, 28.6% from 25 to 44, 21.7% from 45 to 64, and 15.2% who were 65 years of age or older. The median age was 36 years. For every 100 females there were 92.8 males. For every 100 females age 18 and over, there were 91.2 males.

The median income for a household in the city was $32,813, and the median income for a family was $35,938. Males had a median income of $23,269 versus $17,039 for females. The per capita income for the city was $20,727. About 3.0% of families and 6.7% of the population were below the poverty line, including 12.1% of those under age 18 and 1.7% of those age 65 or over.
