= Table Rock, Phelps County, Missouri =

Unincorporated area in the US state of Missouri

Coordinates: 37°57′49″N 91°59′48″W

Table Rock is an unincorporated area in northwestern Phelps County, in the U.S. state of Missouri. The community is located on the west bank of the Gasconade River, approximately 2.5 miles north of Jerome.

The area was so named for a rock formation in the shape of a table.
