= Clementine, Missouri =

Ghost town in Missouri, United States

Coordinates: 37°52′35″N 92°01′03″W

Clementine is an unincorporated community in western Phelps County, in the U.S. state of Missouri. It lies along the former U.S. Route 66. The community is located fourteen miles southwest of Rolla.

== History ==
A post office called Clementine was established in 1891, and remained in operation until 1926. The namesake of Clementine is unknown. However, it is rumored that the wife of the postmaster liked clementines.
