= Clinton, Phelps County, Missouri =

Unincorporated community in Missouri, U.S.

Coordinates: 37°48′49″N 91°33′35″W

Clinton is an unincorporated community in Phelps County, in the U.S. state of Missouri.

== History ==
Variant names were "Clinton Bank" and "Clinton Mine". The community was named after Jake Clinton, the proprietor of a local mine. The community once contained the Clinton Bank School, now defunct.
