= Royal, Missouri =

Unincorporated community in Missouri, U.S.

Coordinates: 38°07′41″N 91°34′48″W

Royal is an unincorporated community in northeastern Phelps County, in the U.S. state of Missouri. The community is on Missouri Route B, approximately eight miles north of St. James.

== History ==
A post office called Royal was established in 1892, and remained in operation until 1916. It is unknown why the name "Royal" was applied to this community.
