= Blooming Rose, Missouri =

Unincorporated community in Missouri, U.S.

Coordinates: 37°36′46″N 91°58′22″W

Blooming Rose is an unincorporated community in the southwest corner of Phelps County, in the U.S. state of Missouri. The community is on Missouri Route K between Beulah to the east and Duke to the north. Licking is approximately nine miles (14 km) to the southeast, in Texas County.

== History ==
Blooming Rose was named for a bed of wild roses near the original town site. The Blooming Rose post office closed in 1955.
