= Northwye, Missouri =

Former community in Missouri, United States

Coordinates: 37°58′30″N 91°45′21″W

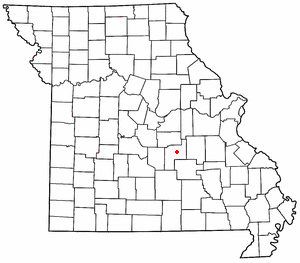

Northwye is a former community in Phelps County, Missouri, United States. It lies at the north junction of U.S. Routes 63 and 66, approximately one mile north of Rolla. The name refers to the Y-intersection of the two roads north of town.
