= Yancy Mills, Missouri =

Unincorporated community in Missouri, U.S.

Coordinates: 37°47′28″N 91°50′03″W

Yancy Mills (also called Yancy) is an unincorporated community in Phelps County, Missouri, United States.

The community is located on Little Piney Creek at the U.S. Route 63 crossing and north of Edgar Springs. It is in the Mark Twain National Forest, and the Lane Spring Recreation Area lies about one mile downstream.

== History ==
A variant name was "Yancy". A post office called Yancey was established in 1861, the name was changed to Yancey Mills in 1870, and the post office closed in 1954. The community was named after Yancey Mills, Virginia, the native home of a local millner.
