= Winkler, Missouri =

Unincorporated community in Missouri, U.S.

Coordinates: 37°50′09″N 91°33′26″W

Winkler is an unincorporated community in southeast Phelps County, in the U.S. state of Missouri. The community is located on Missouri Route 68, thirteen miles north of Salem and eleven miles south of St. James.

== History ==
A post office called Winkler was established in 1899, and remained in operation until 1932. The community has the name of John Winkler, a businessperson in the local mining industry.
