= Craddock, Missouri =

Unincorporated community in Missouri, U.S.

Coordinates: 37°38′22″N 91°50′46″W

Craddock is an unincorporated community in southern Phelps County, in the U.S. state of Missouri. The community is one mile east of U.S. Route 63. Licking is approximately nine miles to the south in Texas County and Edgar Springs is about nine miles to the north.

== History ==
A post office called Craddock was established in 1893, and remained in operation until 1954. Dan Craddock, an early postmaster, gave the community his last name.
