= Murphy, Missouri =

- Census-designated place
- Location of Murphy, Missouri
- Coordinates: 38°29′31″N 90°29′09″W
- Country: United States
- State: Missouri
- County: Jefferson

Area
  - Total: 3.90 sq mi (10.10 km^{2})
  - Land: 3.86 sq mi (10.01 km^{2})
  - Water: 0.039 sq mi (0.10 km^{2})
- Elevation: 538 ft (164 m)

Population (2020)
  - Total: 8,425
  - Density: 2,180.7/sq mi (841.99/km^{2})
- Time zone: UTC-6 (Central (CST))
  - Summer (DST): UTC-5 (CDT)
- ZIP Code: 63026
- FIPS code: 29-50834
- GNIS feature ID: 2393142

Murphy is a census-designated place (CDP) in Jefferson County, Missouri, United States. The population was 8,690 at the 2010 census, down from 9,048 in 2000.

== History ==
A post office called Murphy was established in 1894, and remained in operation until 1906. The community has the name of the local Murphy family.

== Geography ==
Murphy is located in northern Jefferson County with its northern border following the St. Louis County line. Missouri Route 30 passes through the community, leading northeast 19 miles (31 km) to downtown St. Louis and southwest 35 miles (56 km) to St. Clair.

According to the United States Census Bureau, the CDP has a total area of 4.0 square miles (10.3 km^{2}), of which 0.04 square miles (0.1 km^{2}), or 0.95%, are water.

== Demographics ==
Historical population
Census	Pop.	Note	%±
2000	9,048		—
2010	8,690		−4.0%
2020	8,425		−3.0%
U.S. Decennial Census

=== 2020 census ===
As of the 2020 census, Murphy had a population of 8,425. The median age was 41.2 years. 21.2% of residents were under the age of 18 and 17.5% of residents were 65 years of age or older. For every 100 females there were 98.3 males, and for every 100 females age 18 and over there were 98.1 males age 18 and over.

99.8% of residents lived in urban areas, while 0.2% lived in rural areas.

There were 3,548 households in Murphy, of which 27.4% had children under the age of 18 living in them. Of all households, 43.1% were married-couple households, 19.6% were households with a male householder and no spouse or partner present, and 28.0% were households with a female householder and no spouse or partner present. About 27.9% of all households were made up of individuals and 10.9% had someone living alone who was 65 years of age or older.

There were 3,783 housing units, of which 6.2% were vacant. The homeowner vacancy rate was 1.6% and the rental vacancy rate was 8.1%.

Racial composition as of the 2020 census
Race	Number	Percent
White	7,244	86.0%
Black or African American	156	1.9%
American Indian and Alaska Native	53	0.6%
Asian	67	0.8%
Native Hawaiian and Other Pacific Islander	5	0.1%
Some other race	204	2.4%
Two or more races	696	8.3%
Hispanic or Latino (of any race)	439	5.2%

=== 2000 census ===
As of the census of 2000, there were 9,048 people, 3,463 households, and 2,489 families residing in the CDP. The population density was 2,281.9 inhabitants per square mile (881.0/km^{2}). There were 3,613 housing units at an average density of 911.2 per square mile (351.8/km^{2}). The racial makeup of the CDP was 97.75% White, 0.22% African American, 0.20% Native American, 0.43% Asian, 0.33% from other races, and 1.07% from two or more races. Hispanic or Latino of any race were 1.07% of the population.

There were 3,463 households, out of which 35.4% had children under the age of 18 living with them, 55.1% were married couples living together, 11.9% had a female householder with no husband present, and 28.1% were non-families. 22.1% of all households were made up of individuals, and 7.0% had someone living alone who was 65 years of age or older. The average household size was 2.61 and the average family size was 3.05.

In the CDP, the population was spread out, with 26.5% under the age of 18, 8.8% from 18 to 24, 32.6% from 25 to 44, 22.3% from 45 to 64, and 9.7% who were 65 years of age or older. The median age was 35 years. For every 100 females, there were 96.1 males. For every 100 females age 18 and over, there were 93.6 males.

The median income for a household in the CDP was $42,430, and the median income for a family was $48,060. Males had a median income of $35,373 versus $25,630 for females. The per capita income for the CDP was $20,374. About 4.5% of families and 5.8% of the population were below the poverty line, including 8.2% of those under age 18 and 6.0% of those age 65 or over.
