= Seaton, Missouri =

Unincorporated community in Missouri, U.S.

Coordinates: 37°48′28″N 91°36′09″W

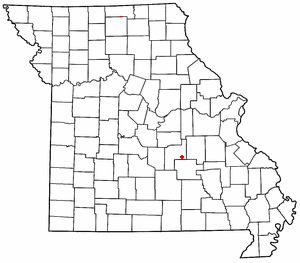

Seaton is an unincorporated community in southeastern Phelps County, Missouri, United States. It is located approximately thirteen miles southeast of Rolla.

== History ==
A post office called Seaton was established in 1907, and remained in operation until 1965. The community has the name of Samuel Seaton, the original owner of the site. The early rural school for the community was the Highland School.

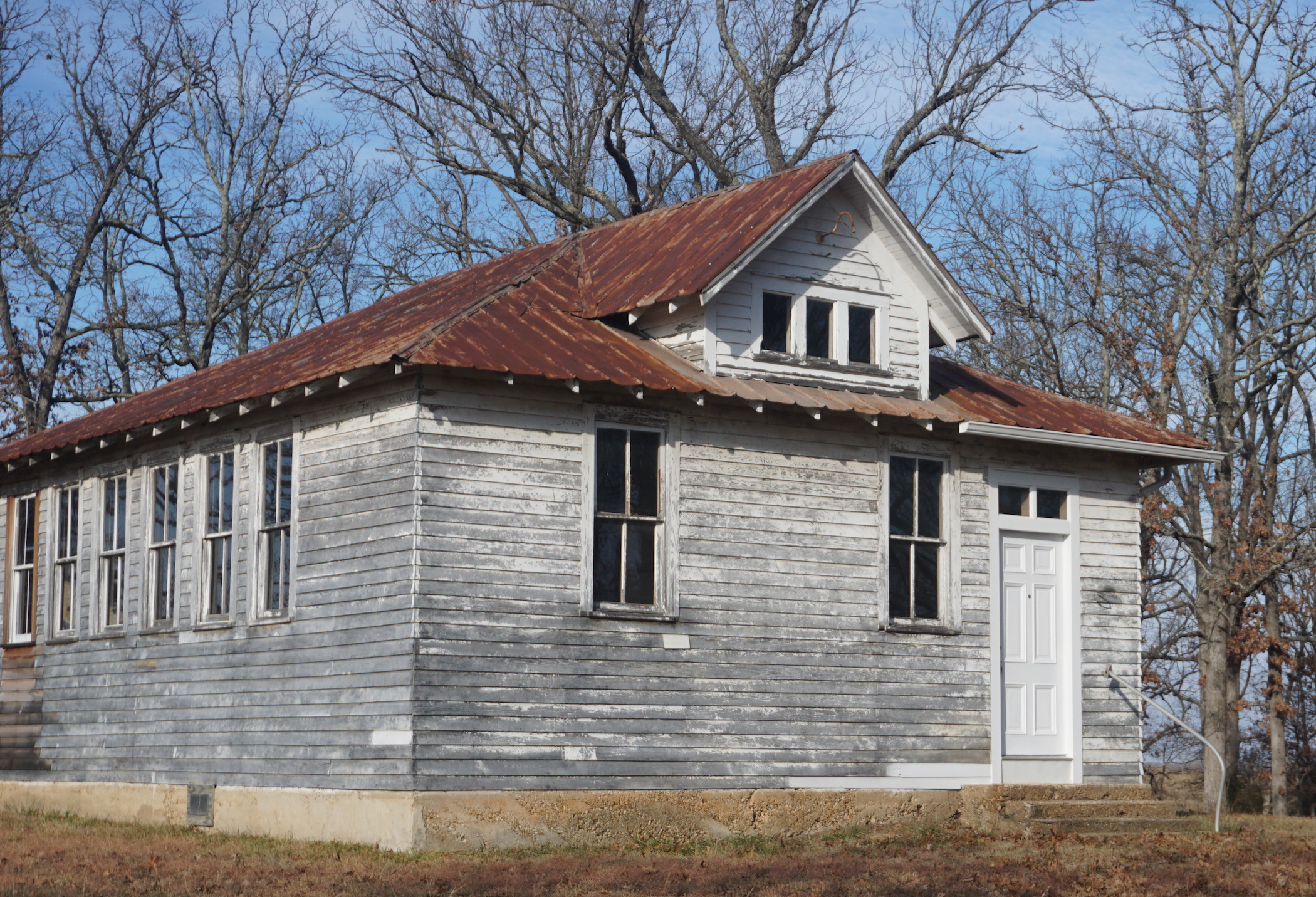
Highland School Building at Seaton
