= Phelps County Courthouse (Missouri) =

- U.S. National Register of Historic Places
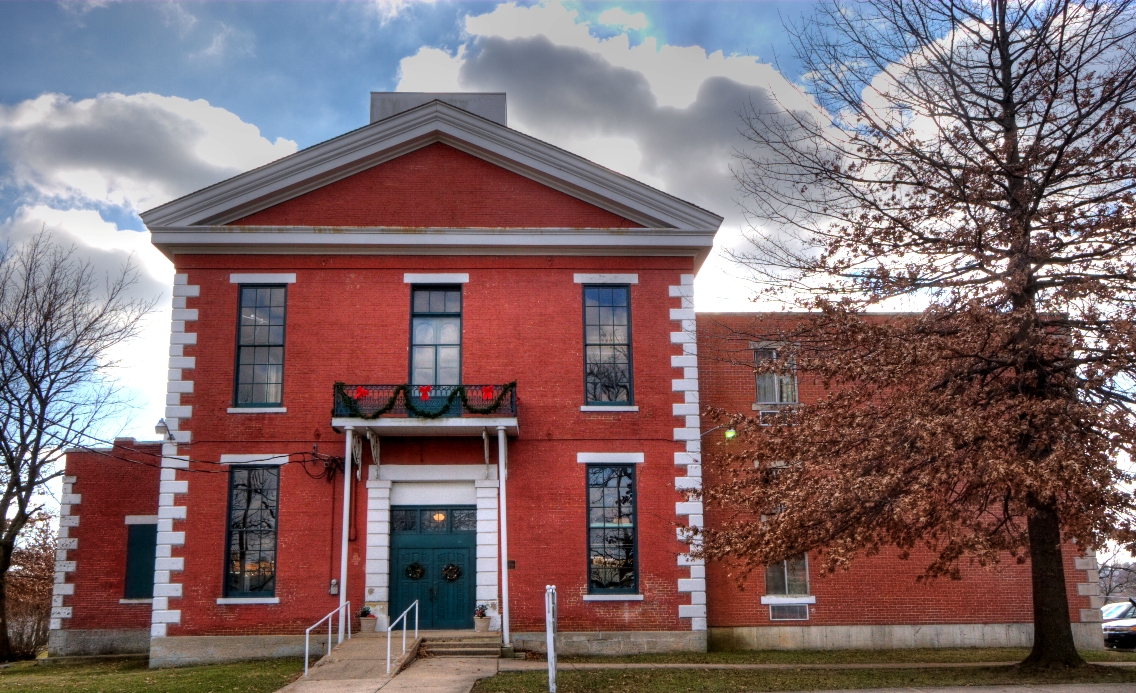

- Location within Missouri Location within the United States
- Interactive map of the Phelps County Courthouse
- Location: Jct. of Third and Main Sts., Rolla, Missouri
- Coordinates: 37°56′45″N 91°46′22″W
- Area: 1.9 acres (0.77 ha)
- Built: 1860-1868
- Architect: Multiple
- Architectural style: Greek Revival
- NRHP reference No.: 92001745
- Added to NRHP: January 7, 1993

The Phelps County Courthouse is a historic courthouse located in Rolla, Phelps County, Missouri. The original section was built between 1860 and 1868 and is a two-story, Greek Revival style brick building. The original building measures approximately 45 feet by 65 feet. It sits on a stone foundation and has a low-pitched gable roof. A series of additions were made in 1881, 1912, c. 1950, and 1979.

It was listed on the National Register of Historic Places in 1993.
