= Dillon, Missouri =

Unincorporated community in Missouri, U.S.

Coordinates: 37°58′19″N 91°41′53″W

Dillon is an unincorporated community in Phelps County, in the U.S. state of Missouri. The community is located along the BNSF railroad line between Rolla and St. James.

== History ==
A post office called Dillon was established in 1861, and remained in operation until 1954. The community has the name of John A. Dillon, an early citizen.
