= Elk Prairie, Missouri =

Unincorporated community in Missouri, U.S.

Coordinates: 37°51′51″N 91°42′18″W

Elk Prairie is an unincorporated community in Phelps County, in the U.S. state of Missouri. The community was located on Missouri Route 72 approximately seven miles south-southeast of Rolla.

== History ==
The community was named for a prairie near the original town site where elk once were often seen. A post office called Elk Prairie was established in 1876, and remained in operation until 1915. The community once had a schoolhouse. A cemetery marks the site.
