= Vida, Missouri =

Unincorporated community in the US state of Missouri

Coordinates: 37°51′25″N 91°47′59″W

Vida is an unincorporated community in Phelps County, Missouri, United States. Vida is approximately six miles south of Rolla, near the junction of US Highway 63 and Missouri Route W. Vida is located at an elevation of 1033 feet above sea level. Vida can be found on Phelps County plat maps in Section 10, Township 36 N, Range 9 W.

A post office called Vida was established in 1898, and remained in operation until 1977. An early postmaster gave the community the name of a local girl in the neighborhood.

Vida has not been included in past U.S. Census counts, so there is no population information for this community. Vida does not have a dedicated U.S. post office location, and is instead served by the Newburg, Missouri post office.
