= Flag Spring, Missouri =

Unincorporated community in Phelps County, Missouri, United States

Coordinates: 38°01′30″N 91°36′14″W

Flag Spring Flag Springs
- Unincorporated community
- Location in Missouri
- Country: United States
- State: Missouri
- County: Phelps

Flag Spring (also called Flag Springs) is an unincorporated community in northeastern Phelps County, in the U.S. state of Missouri.

The community is located on Missouri Route B, approximately one mile north of St. James and Interstate 44.

== History ==
The community once contained a schoolhouse called Flag Spring School. The area most likely took its name from a nearby spring noted for the flag irises along its course. A cemetery marks the site.
