= Powellville, Missouri =

Former town in Missouri, U.S.

Coordinates: 37°53′22″N 92°00′53″W

Powellville is a former town on U.S. Highway 66, now an outer road of Interstate 44 in western Phelps County, Missouri, United States. It is located approximately 12 miles (19 km) southwest of Rolla on a ridge between Tater Hollow to the east and the Gasconade River approximately one mile to the west in adjacent Pulaski County.

== History ==
Powellville was constructed in the late 1920s or early 1930s, with a small motel to serve the drivers of Powell Brothers Truck Line. They traveled from southwest Missouri to St. Louis with freight.
