= Interstate 44 =

Interstate Highway mostly in Oklahoma and Missouri

Interstate 44
- I-44 highlighted in red

Route information
- Length: 636.69 mi (1,024.65 km)
- Existed: August 14, 1957–present
- NHS: Entire route

Major junctions
- West end: US 82 / US 277 / US 281 / US 287 in Wichita Falls, TX
- I-35 / I-40 in Oklahoma City, OK; US 64 / US 75 / US 169 in Tulsa, OK; I-244 / US 412 in Tulsa, OK; US 166 / US 400 in Joplin, MO; I-49 / US 71 in Joplin, MO; US 65 in Springfield, MO; US 63 in Rolla, MO; I-55 / I-64 / US 40 in St. Louis, MO
- East end: I-70 in St. Louis, MO

Location
- Country: United States
- States: Texas, Oklahoma, Missouri

Highway system
- Interstate Highway System; Main; Auxiliary; Suffixed; Business; Future

Interstate 44 (I-44) is an Interstate Highway in the central United States. Although it is nominally an east–west road as it is even-numbered, it follows a more southwest–northeast alignment. Its western terminus is in Wichita Falls, Texas, at a concurrency with U.S. Route 277 (US 277), US 281, and US 287; its eastern terminus is at I-70 in St. Louis, Missouri. I-44 is one of five Interstates built to bypass US 66; this highway covers the section between Oklahoma City and St. Louis. Virtually the entire length of I-44 east of Springfield, Missouri, was once US 66, which was upgraded from two to four lanes from 1949 to 1955. The section of I-44 west of Springfield was built farther south than US 66 in order to connect Missouri's section with the already completed Will Rogers Turnpike, which Oklahoma wished to carry its part of I-44.

== Route description ==
Lengths
	mi	km
TX	15	24
OK	329	529
MO	293	472
Total	637	1,025

=== Texas ===
In the US state of Texas, I-44 has a short but regionally important 14.77-mile (23.77 km) stretch, connecting Wichita Falls with Oklahoma. The route runs almost due north to the Texas–Oklahoma state line at the Red River. In Wichita Falls, I-44 runs concurrently with US 277, US 281, and US 287 and is known locally as the Central Freeway. I-44 provides access to downtown Wichita Falls and Sheppard Air Force Base.

=== Oklahoma ===
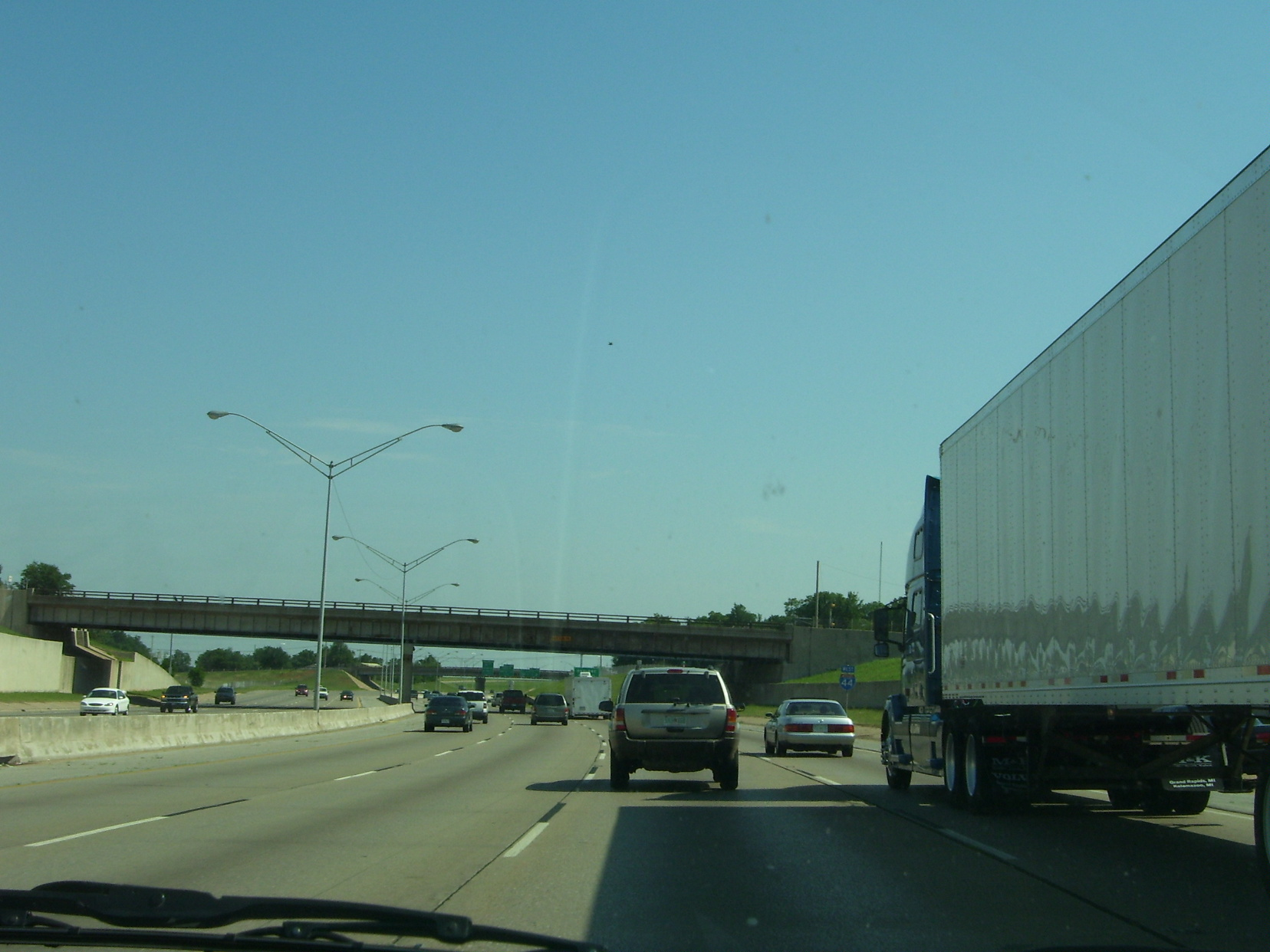
I-44 in Oklahoma City

I-44 in Oklahoma is mostly three separate toll roads; it is paralleled by former US 66 from Oklahoma City to the Missouri state line. In southwestern Oklahoma, I-44 is the H. E. Bailey Turnpike and it runs northeast–southwest (and vice-versa). In the Oklahoma City area, I-44 is either six or eight lanes; it runs concurrent with I-35 for about four miles (6.4 km) in Oklahoma City. From Oklahoma City, I-44 runs northeast–southwest as the Turner Turnpike toward Tulsa. After I-44 leaves Tulsa, it becomes the Will Rogers Turnpike to the Missouri state line.

=== Missouri ===
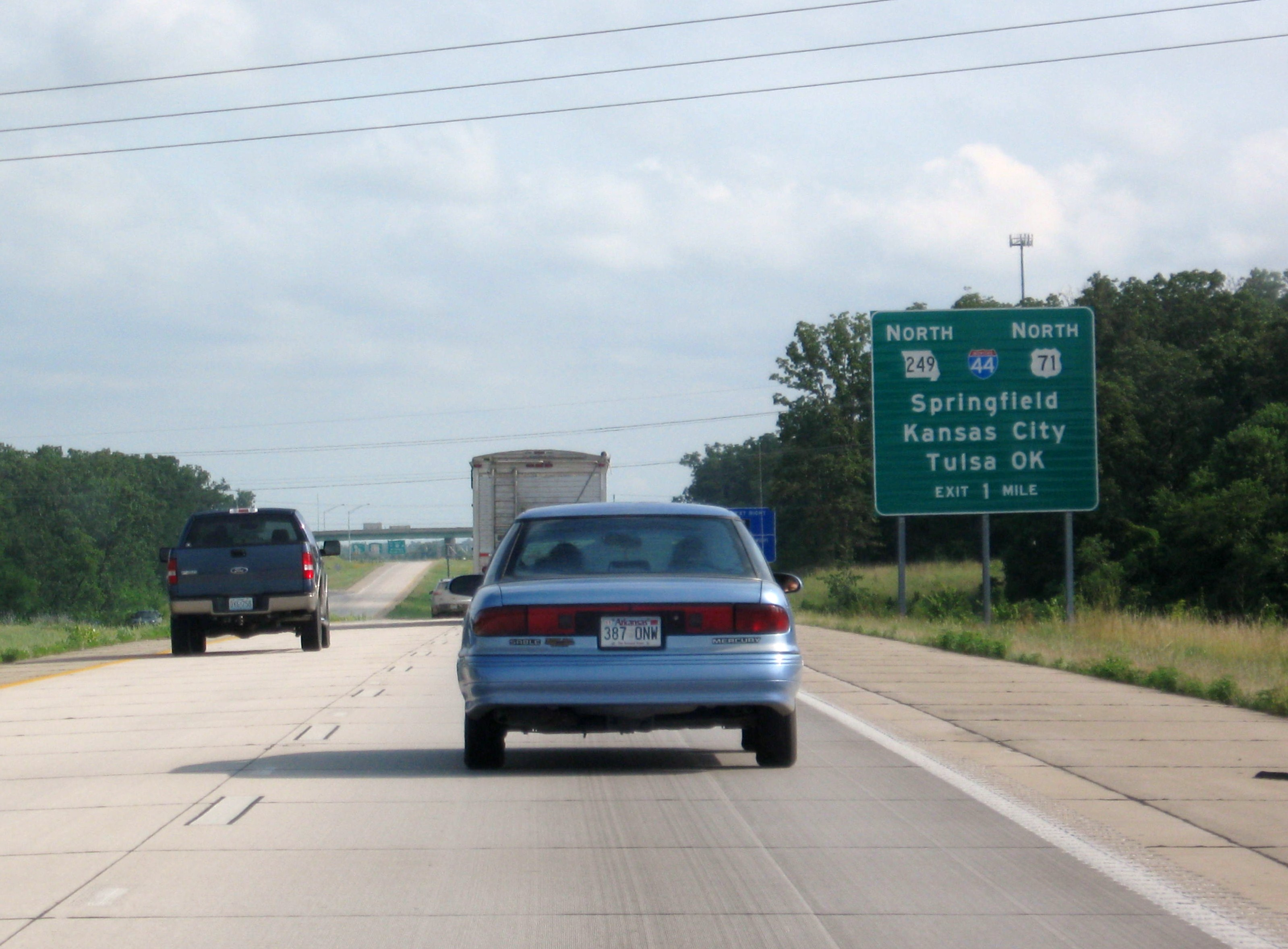
I-44 approached by US 71 just south of Joplin, Missouri. This photo was taken before US 71 was upgraded to I-49.

I-44 enters Missouri in the city limits of Joplin near the tripoint of Oklahoma, Missouri, and Kansas. It misses the Kansas border by less than 200 yards (180 m). The first exit in Missouri is for US 166. I-44 continues through the southern part of Joplin, where it runs concurrently with the new Missouri segment of I-49. East of Joplin, I-49 splits off on its own alignment to Kansas City.

I-44 then continues east on the former US 166 to Mount Vernon. At the northeast part of Mount Vernon, I-44 heads northeast, while old US 166 continued east on Route 174. The section of road to Halltown is a completely new road, not bypassing any previous highways. At Halltown, the road follows the general pathway of US 66 all the way to downtown St. Louis.

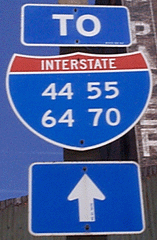
A nonstandard depiction of I-44/I-55/I-64/I-70 in downtown St. Louis

I-44 passes through Springfield on the north side of the city and continues northeast. At Waynesville, I-44 enters a very hilly and curvy area until it passes Rolla. Although the road still passes through some hilly areas, none are as steep as that particular stretch.

At Pacific, I-44 widens to six lanes, later to eight lanes. The Interstate passes through the suburbs of St. Louis and then into downtown St. Louis, passing the Gateway Arch before finally terminating near the Mississippi River, continuing from there as I-70 from the west end of the Stan Musial Veterans Memorial Bridge. Until a future second span of the new bridge is completed, there will be no way for I-44 traffic to utilize the new Stan Musial Veterans Memorial span without first exiting to surface streets. I-44 traffic wishing to continue northeast and east must use the Poplar Street Bridge and I-55/I-64 to cross the Mississippi River.

At some places, an "Alternate I-44" is posted. One such ran between Rolla and Springfield via US 60 and US 63, and another ran via US 63 and US 50 between Rolla and Union. These were completed to provide traffic relief during road work. The latter of these alternate routes detoured traffic around three-hour delays due to road work near Cuba.

== History ==
I-44 was originally signed in 1958 as an Interstate designation of the Turner Turnpike linking Oklahoma City and Tulsa and the Will Rogers Turnpike linking Tulsa and the Missouri state line southwest of Joplin, along with the US 66 bypass in Tulsa that linked that city with the two turnpikes and the continued four-lane highway from the Missouri border to an interchange with US 71 south of Joplin previously designated as US 166.

As US 66 was being bypassed by I-44, the Route 66 Association requested the designation Interstate 66 for I-44 from St. Louis to Oklahoma City; The American Association of State Highway and Transportation Officials (AASHTO) rejected the request.

At the time the I-44 designation was assigned in Oklahoma in the 1950s, Oklahoma signed the milemarkers west to east starting at Turner Turnpike's Oklahoma City terminus at the I-44/I-35 interchange (near Edmond). I-44 was extended in 1982 southwest of Oklahoma City along the existing H. E. Bailey Turnpike, thus raising the milemarkers by about 100. The addition of the new section was unusual in that it is a more north–south segment and did not directly connect to the previous western end at I-35. It now extends south of I-40, an exception to the Interstate numbering rules and its end point does not connect to another Interstate Highway.

What was once I-244 around St. Louis is currently part of that city's I-270/I-255 beltway.

During the historic 1999 Oklahoma tornado outbreak, an F5 tornado crossed I-44. This particular tornado had the fastest tornado wind speeds on record. The interstate was severely damaged where the tornado crossed it. In the end, this tornado was blamed for 36 deaths.

A section of I-44 was moved slightly north between Powellville and Doolittle, Missouri. The old road is highly visible for eastbound traffic near Powellville. As of April 2006, the rocks carved away for the new roadbed have virtually no lichen, reflecting that this construction occurred rather recently.

Originally, the eastern terminus of I-44 was at the intersection with I-55, I-64, I-70, and US 40, by the Poplar Street Bridge. However, when I-70 was rerouted to cross the Mississippi River at the newly constructed Stan Musial Veterans Memorial Bridge, I-44 was extended about 1.5 miles (2.4 km) north to end at I-70 at the bridge.

== Junction list ==
Texas
US 277 / US 281 / US 287 in Wichita Falls. I-44/US 287 travels concurrently through Wichita Falls. I-44/US 277/US 281 travels concurrently to west-southwest of Randlett, Oklahoma.
Oklahoma
US 70 / US 277 / US 281 west of Randlett
US 277 / US 281 in Walters
US 277 / US 281 northwest of Geronimo. The highways travel concurrently to east of Medicine Park.
US 62 in Lawton. The highways travel concurrently to east of Medicine Park.
US 277 in Elgin
US 81 / US 277 in Chickasha
US 62 / US 277 in Chickasha
US 62 in Newcastle. I-44/US 62 travels concurrently to Oklahoma City.
I-240 / US 62 in Oklahoma City
I-40 / US 270 in Oklahoma City
I-235 / US 77 in Oklahoma City
I-35 in Oklahoma City. The highways travel concurrently through northeast Oklahoma City.
US 377 in Stroud
I-244 on the Sapulpa–Oakhurst line
US 75 in Tulsa
US 64 in Tulsa
US 169 in Tulsa
I-244 / US 412 in Tulsa. I-44/US 412 travels concurrently to the Tulsa–Fair Oaks line
US 69 in Big Cabin
US 60 / US 69 in Vinita
US 59 / US 60 / US 69 northeast of Afton
Missouri
US 166 / US 400 in Joplin
I-49 / US 71 in Joplin. The highways travel concurrently through the city.
US 160 in Springfield
US 65 in Springfield
US 63 in Rolla
US 50 south-southwest of Villa Ridge. The highways travel concurrently to the Sunset Hills–Kirkwood city line.
I-270 in Sunset Hills
US 50 / US 61 / US 67 on the Sunset Hills–Kirkwood city line
I-55 in St. Louis. The highways travel concurrently through St. Louis
I-55 / I-64 / US 40 in St. Louis
I-70 in St. Louis

== Auxiliary routes ==
I-44 has three auxiliary routes, and all are located in Oklahoma. I-244 and the unsigned I-444 are located in Tulsa, while I-344—also known as the Kilpatrick Turnpike—is located in Oklahoma City. A former auxiliary route numbered I-244 was located in St. Louis, Missouri, but that number was decommissioned in 1974 and replaced with I-270.

=== Business routes ===
All business loops of I-44 are located in Missouri. They serve Joplin, Sarcoxie, Mount Vernon, Springfield, Lebanon, Waynesville–St. Robert, Rolla, and Pacific. A business spur links I-44 with Fort Leonard Wood.
