= Duke, Missouri =

Unincorporated community in Missouri, U.S.

Coordinates: 37°39′37″N 92°00′39″W

Duke is an unincorporated community in southwest Phelps County, Missouri, United States. It is located approximately thirteen miles northwest of Licking and five miles east of Fort Leonard Wood. The community is on Missouri Route K and two miles east of a meander in the Big Piney River in the Mark Twain National Forest.

== History ==
A post office opened in 1906 and ran for decades, but it is no longer open. Residents have to go to Newburg to find the nearest post office. The community was named after Duke's Mixture, a brand of pipe tobacco sold at the local country store.
