= Edgar Springs, Missouri =

- City
- Location of Edgar Springs, Missouri
- Coordinates: 37°42′09″N 91°51′58″W
- Country: United States
- State: Missouri
- County: Phelps

Area
  - Total: 0.47 sq mi (1.22 km^{2})
  - Land: 0.47 sq mi (1.21 km^{2})
  - Water: 0 sq mi (0.00 km^{2})
- Elevation: 1,211 ft (369 m)

Population (2020)
  - Total: 199
  - Density: 424.6/sq mi (163.93/km^{2})
- Time zone: UTC-6 (Central (CST))
  - Summer (DST): UTC-5 (CDT)
- ZIP code: 65462
- Area code: 573
- FIPS code: 29-21214
- GNIS feature ID: 2394617

Edgar Springs is a city in Phelps County, Missouri, United States. The population was 199 at the 2020 census.

== History ==
A post office called Edgar Springs has been in operation since 1866. The community was named after a nearby spring on the property of John Edgar.

== Geography ==
Edgar Springs is located on the Salem Plateau region of the Missouri Ozarks. The town is on U.S. Route 63 at the southern edge of the Mark Twain National Forest. Rolla is approximately 18 miles to the north and Licking in Texas County is 13 miles to the south.

According to the United States Census Bureau, the city has a total area of 0.65 square miles (1.68 km^{2}), all land.

As of the 2000 census, Edgar Springs was the closest town to the mean center of U.S. population, the theoretical center of the United States based on population. The exact point was approximately 2.8 miles east of the town at 37°41'49.15" North, 91°48'34.44" West.

== Demographics ==
Historical population
Census	Pop.	Note	%±
1880	48		—
1980	271		—
1990	215		−20.7%
2000	190		−11.6%
2010	208		9.5%
2020	199		−4.3%
U.S. Decennial Census

=== 2010 census ===
As of the census of 2010, there were 208 people, 87 households, and 58 families living in the city. The population density was 320.0 inhabitants per square mile (123.6/km^{2}). There were 112 housing units at an average density of 172.3 per square mile (66.5/km^{2}). The racial makeup of the city was 95.67% White and 4.33% from two or more races. Hispanic or Latino of any race were 0.96% of the population.

There were 87 households, of which 31.0% had children under the age of 18 living with them, 50.6% were married couples living together, 10.3% had a female householder with no husband present, 5.7% had a male householder with no wife present, and 33.3% were non-families. 27.6% of all households were made up of individuals, and 13.8% had someone living alone who was 65 years of age or older. The average household size was 2.39 and the average family size was 2.88.

The median age in the city was 37.5 years. 23.1% of residents were under the age of 18; 11.1% were between the ages of 18 and 24; 27.9% were from 25 to 44; 25.1% were from 45 to 64; and 13% were 65 years of age or older. The gender makeup of the city was 47.1% male and 52.9% female.

=== 2000 census ===
As of the census of 2000, there were 190 people, 91 households, and 53 families living in the city. The population density was 390.3 inhabitants per square mile (150.7/km^{2}). There were 100 housing units at an average density of 205.4 per square mile (79.3/km^{2}). The racial makeup of the city was 96.84% White, 2.11% Native American, 0.53% Asian, 0.53% from other races. Hispanic or Latino of any race were 2.63% of the population.

There were 91 households, out of which 23.1% had children under the age of 18 living with them, 39.6% were married couples living together, 13.2% had a female householder with no husband present, and 40.7% were non-families. 38.5% of all households were made up of individuals, and 24.2% had someone living alone who was 65 years of age or older. The average household size was 2.09 and the average family size was 2.74.

In the city the population was spread out, with 21.6% under the age of 18, 6.3% from 18 to 24, 27.9% from 25 to 44, 23.7% from 45 to 64, and 20.5% who were 65 years of age or older. The median age was 41 years. For every 100 females there were 97.9 males. For every 100 females age 18 and over, there were 86.3 males.

The median income for a household in the city was $30,000, and the median income for a family was $30,781. Males had a median income of $25,625 versus $20,625 for females. The per capita income for the city was $12,672. None of the families and 4.9% of the population were living below the poverty line, including no under eighteens and 22.9% of those over 64.

== Traffic tickets ==
The city has been identified as a speed trap.

In 2015, the city fought a proposed law that limited how much money municipalities could make from traffic fines. In 2018, the city filed a financial statement with the Missouri State Auditor's Office. Most cities are limited to keeping 20% of their annual general operating revenue. A resident who petitioned for the 2018 audit of city revenue was banned from the premises of city hall with the exception of board meetings. A 2022 court ruling found the city in violation of both due process and Sunshine Law requirements.

== Climate ==
Edgar Springs has a humid subtropical climate with cold winters and warm summers.

Climate data for Edgar Springs
Month	Jan	Feb	Mar	Apr	May	Jun	Jul	Aug	Sep	Oct	Nov	Dec	Year
Mean daily maximum °F (°C)	41 (5)	47 (8)	57 (14)	68 (20)	77 (25)	84 (29)	90 (32)	89 (32)	81 (27)	70 (21)	56 (13)	45 (7)	67 (19)
Mean daily minimum °F (°C)	20 (−7)	25 (−4)	33 (1)	43 (6)	52 (11)	61 (16)	66 (19)	64 (18)	56 (13)	44 (7)	35 (2)	25 (−4)	44 (7)
Average precipitation inches (mm)	2.35 (60)	2.53 (64)	3.94 (100)	4.49 (114)	4.80 (122)	4.44 (113)	3.54 (90)	3.25 (83)	4.17 (106)	3.72 (94)	4.44 (113)	3.43 (87)	45.10 (1,146)

== Notable people ==
- Mayme Ousley, first woman elected mayor of a town in Missouri, was born in Edgar Springs.
- James Robert Lamar, Missouri congressman who was born here in 1866.
- Dean Switzer, preacher of Edgar Springs Baptist Church from 2016-2021. Grandfather to Vincent K. Switzer, who died in 2005. Some say his ghost still haunts the church to this day.
