= Jerome, Missouri =

Unincorporated community in Missouri, U.S.

Coordinates: 37°55′34″N 91°58′40″W

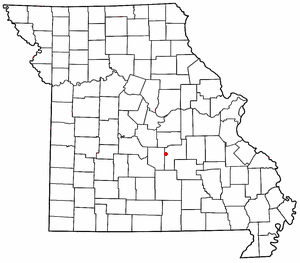

Jerome is an unincorporated community in western Phelps County, Missouri, United States. It is located on the Gasconade River near Interstate 44, and is approximately ten miles west of Rolla, near the edge of the Mark Twain National Forest.

== History ==
Jerome was originally called "Fremont Town", and under the latter name was platted in 1867 when the railroad was extended through the neighborhood.
