= Phelps County, Missouri =

County in Missouri, United States

- County
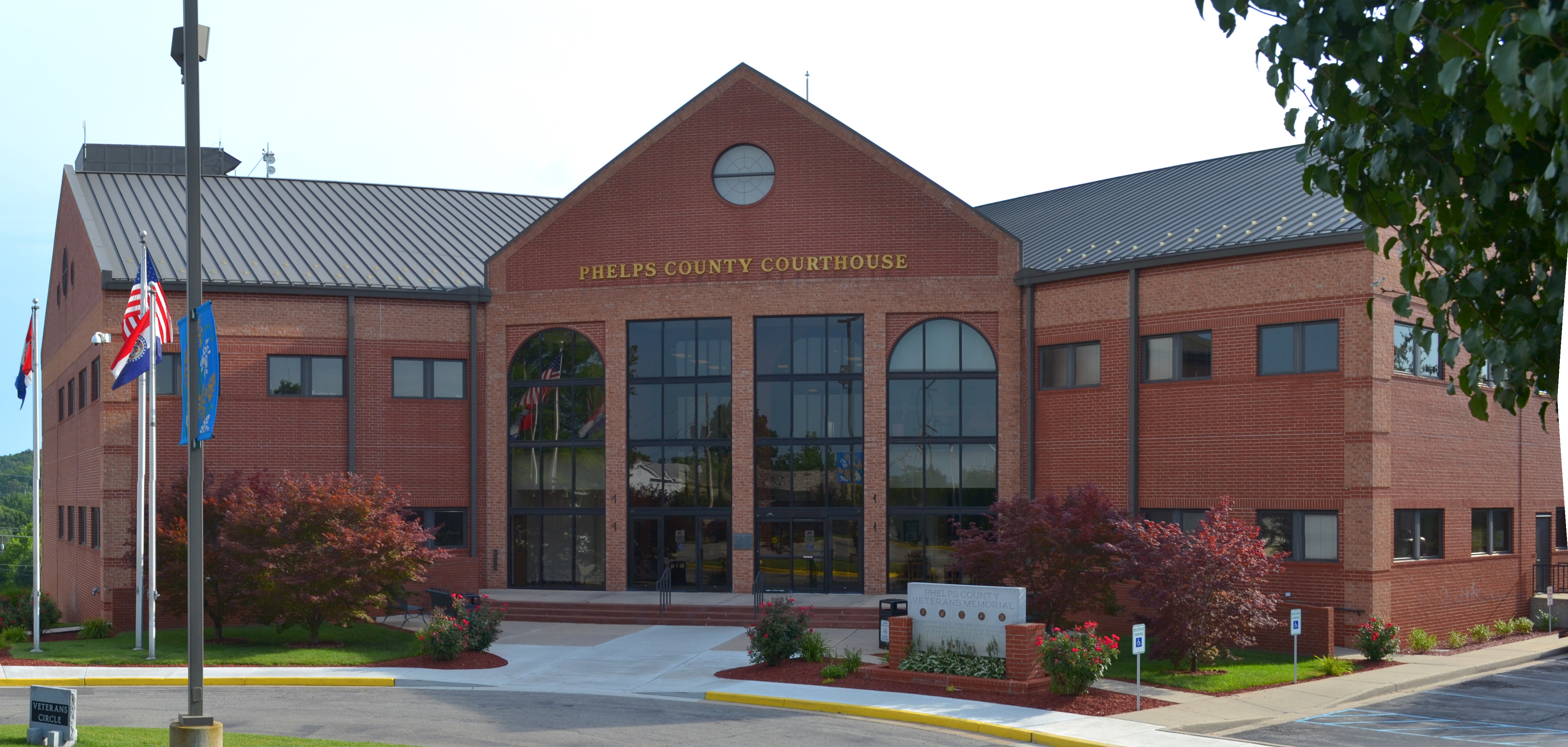
- The new Phelps County Courthouse in Rolla

- Location within the U.S. state of Missouri
- Coordinates: 37°53′N 91°47′W
- Country: United States
- State: Missouri
- Founded: November 13, 1857
- Named for: John S. Phelps
- Seat: Rolla
- Largest city: Rolla

Area
  - Total: 674 sq mi (1,750 km^{2})
  - Land: 672 sq mi (1,740 km^{2})
  - Water: 2.5 sq mi (6.5 km^{2}) 0.4%

Population (2020)
  - Total: 44,638
  - Estimate (2025): 45,247 ▲
  - Density: 66.4/sq mi (25.6/km^{2})
- Time zone: UTC−6 (Central)
  - Summer (DST): UTC−5 (CDT)
- Congressional district: 8th
- Website: www.phelpscounty.org

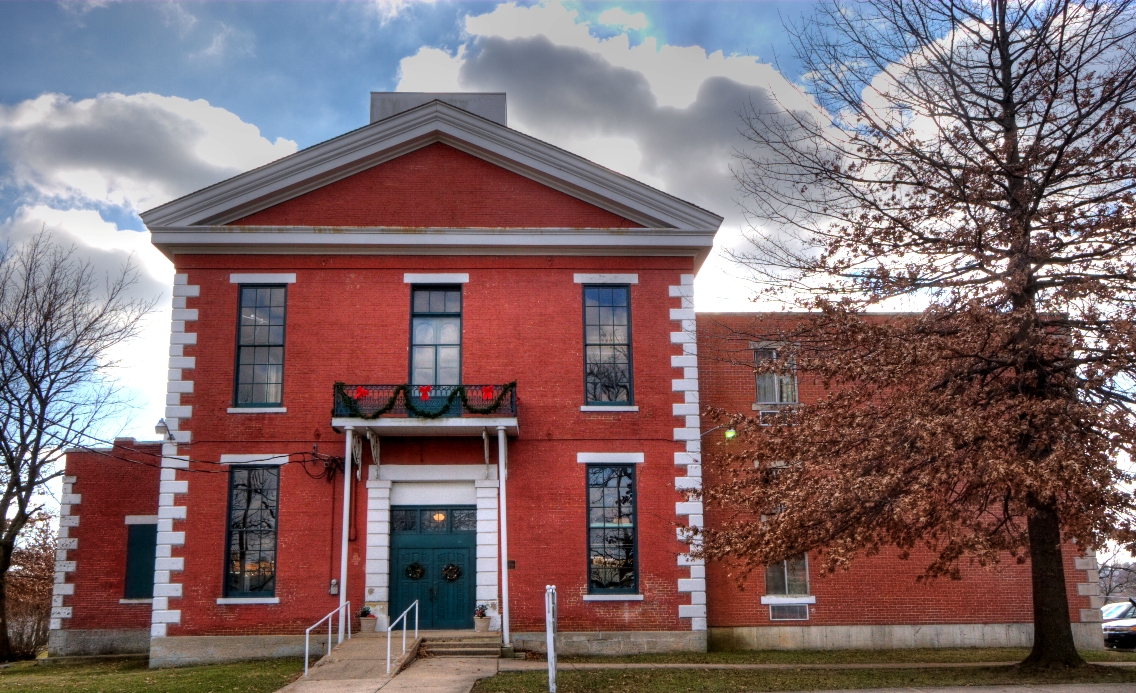
Old county courthouse, listed on the National Register of Historic Places

Phelps County is a county in the central portion of the U.S. state of Missouri. As of the 2020 United States census, its population was 44,638. The largest city and county seat is Rolla. The county was organized on November 13, 1857, and was named for U.S. Representative and Governor of Missouri John Smith Phelps.

According to the U.S. Census Bureau, the mean center of U.S. population in 2000 fell within Phelps County.

Phelps County comprises the Rolla, Missouri micropolitan statistical area. Much of the county is included within the Ozark Highlands American Viticultural Area. Vineyards and wineries were first established in the county by Italian immigrants in Rolla. Since the 1960s, winemakers have revived and created numerous vineyards in Missouri and won national and international tasting awards.

The first Phelps County Court convened on November 25, 1857, in the John Dillon cabin. The historic courthouse was begun in midsummer of 1860, used as a Union hospital during the American Civil War, and served as the courthouse until February 1994, when all county offices were relocated into the new Phelps County Courthouse, which was dedicated on May 22.

== History ==
Settlers of European descent established farms along the riverbanks in this area in 1818–1819. One year later, Lieutenant James Abert started the first railroad reconnaissance survey in Rolla. Abert was later to become the first professor of civil engineering at the Missouri School of Mines. The founder of Rolla, Edmund Ward Bishop, was originally a railroad construction contractor in New York. He came to this part of the country in 1853, tasked with building the Frisco branch of the Southwest Railroad.

Because of an urgent demand, Phelps County was created by legislative action on November 13, 1857, from portions of Pulaski, Maries and Crawford counties. A special commission was appointed to select a county seat, with instructions to locate the site on the mail line of the railroad as near as possible to the county's center. Bishop then offered a tract of some 50 acres (200,000 m^{2}) for the official town site, and it was accepted. There was disagreement over the site – the "westerners" wanted Rolla, and the "easterners" wanted Dillon, so the General Assembly did not legally declare Rolla to be the official county seat until 1861. The 600-strong group that favored Dillon signed a protest citing the fact that only two of the three commission members had met to consider the possible sites for the county seat. They contested the decision all the way through the Missouri Supreme Court. Before the high court could make a decision, however, the Legislature took action on January 14, 1860, confirming the location of the county seat at Rolla. Smarting under a considerable amount of criticism concerning the matter, all members of the county court resigned during April 1858, but later withdrew their resignations. It was finally settled in favor of Rolla.

Rolla was officially surveyed, laid out, and named in 1858. Bishop wanted to call it Phelps Center, since his house was the center of the county. John Webber preferred the name "Hardscrabble" for obvious reasons. George Coppedge, another original settler, and formerly of North Carolina, favored "Raleigh" after his hometown. The others agreed with Coppedge on the condition that it should not have "that silly spelling, but should be spelled 'Rolla'." The county seat locating commission designated the area now known as Rolla to be the county seat.

The town of Rolla did not exist when the county was officially created (November 1857); only the houses of J. Stever and John Webber were located in the area. Early court business included the location and opening of roads from the county seat to various places within the state, including St. Louis, Springfield, Jefferson City, Lake Spring, and Salem. In this last road order, dated in July 1858, the use of the name Rolla first appears in the court records. The name was used earlier, in May 1858, in a deed of railroad land to the county.

On April 26, 1859, the county court ordered the 50 acres (200,000 m^{2}) donated by Mr. Bishop for the site of the county seat to be surveyed. The survey was conducted by A.E. Buchanan, a young railroad surveyor. Buchanan delivered his plat to the county court on May 31, 1859.

=== Civil War ===
The railroad ran its first train on December 22, 1860, making Rolla the terminus of the road. Until the continuation of the Frisco, all goods were loaded on wagons and transported to Springfield and south and west on what is now U.S. Highway 66 (Interstate 44). During the American Civil War, Rolla was an important military post, hosting up to 20,000 Union troops. The Phelps County Court House was transformed into a hospital during the war.

In April 1861, Fort Sumter was fired upon and a decision was made to support the South. On May 10, the Circuit Court session saw a heated debate of secession, which caused a breakup of the proceedings. As the story goes, Circuit Court Judge James McBride soon departed to assume command as a Confederate general under Sterling Price. Outside the courthouse, a group of men drew down the United States flag and raised a Confederate flag, which had been hastily pieced together by the women of Rolla. The tension was thick when the group then moved to the newspaper office of Charles Walder, a Union supporter and editor of the Rolla Express. Walder was forced to close his shop and cease printing. Southern sympathizers patrolled the town day and night, often ordering Union sympathizers to leave town.

On June 14 of that year, General Franz Sigel arrived by train with his 3rd Missouri Infantry and took over the town. From that day until the close of the war, Rolla was in Union hands.

The 13th Illinois Infantry Regiment, under Colonel John B. Wyman, was brought in to guard Rolla and the Pacific Railroad's terminal. This regiment did the basic planning and building of Fort Wyman, although other regiments completed it. President Abraham Lincoln’s personal order was that Rolla should be held at all costs.

Rolla was an important site during the Civil War because the southwest branch of the Pacific Railroad ended here. Thousands of Union troops and their supplies came to Rolla by train from St. Louis and then were transferred to wagon trails to go to the battles of Wilson Creek in Springfield and Pea Ridge and Prairie Grove in Arkansas, plus a number of other smaller skirmishes. The railroad had arrived in Rolla in 1860 but the outbreak of the war halted the westward expansion of the line.

After General Price's defeat at Pea Ridge in March 1862, several troops who were organized by Governor Jackson returned home. Confederate sympathizers, unwilling to profess their loyalty and support to the Union after the battle, were treated harshly. One example is the shooting of former Presiding Justice Lewis F. Wright and four of his sons in 1864, after being taken from their homes for "questioning".The town of about 600 civilians had a large population of Union troops at that time. Since the Union forces seized control of the town early in the war, they had a big impact upon the town and its operation.

The town was a busy place for the visitor. In 1860, sugar sold for 10 cents a pound and tobacco for 30 cents a pound. Whiskey went for 25 cents a gallon. City lots sold for $25 each. The courthouse was used as a hay storage barn and later as a hospital for wounded soldiers. After the commanding general of the Union Forces, General Nathaniel Lyon, was killed at the Wilson's Creek battle near Springfield, his body was brought to Rolla to be transported back east for burial. Old Town Rolla was located along Main Street near the courthouse. The business district moved to Pine Street in the late 19th century.

Following the Union defeat at Wilson's Creek on August 10, 1861, the Union Army fell back to Rolla and began building an earthen fort on a hill alongside present Highway 63 about a mile from the courthouse. The rectangular fort had a dry moat around the perimeter with 32-pound field pieces located on each corner of the fort to cover any attack on Rolla from the south. It was named Fort Wyman after Colonel John B. Wyman. Fort Dette was a more detailed fort that was constructed in 1863 on what is now the campus of Missouri University of Science and Technology. It was constructed in a cross shape with positions for both 24-pound cannons and ports for individual rifle fire.

=== University ===
The Morrill Land-Grant College Act was approved by the U.S. Congress in 1862, and in 1863, the Missouri Legislature accepted this opportunity to set up a new type of higher education within the state. The act specified that the "leading object shall be without excluding other scientific and classical studies, and including military tactics, to teach such branches of learning as are related to agriculture and mechanics arts...in order to promote the liberal and practical education of the industrial classes in the several pursuits of professions of life."

The Missouri School of Mines and Metallurgy was founded in 1870 because the area was rich in minerals and because the geographic location was good. Phelps County bid $130,545, including lands and bonds, and was awarded the prize. Today, it is named Missouri University of Science and Technology (Missouri S&T) and is known as one of the finest engineering schools in the world. Not confined to mining and metallurgy, it confers bachelor's degrees in 23 fields of engineering and science, as well as graduate degrees in 28 fields of engineering and science.

=== Other towns ===
Other towns within the county included Newburg, incorporated in 1888, and St. James, incorporated in 1869. Arlington and Jerome were both incorporated in 1867, but neither is incorporated at this time. Doolittle, the last of Phelps County's towns to be formed, was incorporated on July 2, 1944. Other Phelps County communities include Edgar Springs, which was incorporated during the 1970s.

== Geography ==
According to the US Census Bureau, the county has a total area of 674 square miles (1,750 km^{2}), of which 2.5 sq mi (6.5 km^{2}) (0.4%) are covered by water.

=== Adjacent counties ===
- Maries County – northwest
- Gasconade County – northeast
- Crawford County – east
- Dent County – southeast
- Texas County – south
- Pulaski County – west

=== Major highways ===
- I-44
- US 63
- Route 8
- Route 68
- Route 72

=== Other geographical features ===
- Courtois Hills
- Maramec Spring
- Democrat Ridge
- Mark Twain National Forest, national protected area, partially within Phelps County
- Slaughter Sink, the state's deepest sinkhole

== Demographics ==
Historical population
Census	Pop.	Note	%±
1860	5,714		—
1870	10,506		83.9%
1880	12,568		19.6%
1890	12,636		0.5%
1900	14,194		12.3%
1910	15,796		11.3%
1920	14,941		−5.4%
1930	15,308		2.5%
1940	17,437		13.9%
1950	21,504		23.3%
1960	25,396		18.1%
1970	29,481		16.1%
1980	33,633		14.1%
1990	35,248		4.8%
2000	39,825		13.0%
2010	45,156		13.4%
2020	44,638		−1.1%
2025 (est.)	45,247	▲	1.4%
US Decennial Census; 1790-1960 1900-1990; 1990-2000 2010-2020

=== 2020 census ===
As of the 2020 census, the county had a population of 44,638. The median age was 35.7 years, 20.5% of residents were under the age of 18, and 16.9% of residents were 65 years of age or older. For every 100 females there were 110.1 males, and for every 100 females age 18 and over there were 110.8 males age 18 and over.

46.2% of residents lived in urban areas, while 53.8% lived in rural areas.

There were 17,815 households in the county, of which 26.4% had children under the age of 18 living with them and 26.1% had a female householder with no spouse or partner present. About 32.3% of all households were made up of individuals and 11.7% had someone living alone who was 65 years of age or older.

There were 20,174 housing units, of which 11.7% were vacant. Among occupied housing units, 57.8% were owner-occupied and 42.2% were renter-occupied. The homeowner vacancy rate was 1.8% and the rental vacancy rate was 9.8%.

=== Racial and ethnic composition ===
As of the 2020 census, the racial makeup of the county was 86.0% White, 2.3% Black or African American, 0.6% American Indian and Alaska Native, 3.4% Asian, 0.1% Native Hawaiian and Pacific Islander, 1.1% from some other race, and 6.5% from two or more races. Hispanic or Latino residents of any race comprised 2.8% of the population.

Phelps County, Missouri – Racial and ethnic composition Note: the US Census treats Hispanic/Latino as an ethnic category. This table excludes Latinos from the racial categories and assigns them to a separate category. Hispanics/Latinos may be of any race.
Race / Ethnicity (NH = Non-Hispanic)	Pop 1980	Pop 1990	Pop 2000	Pop 2010	Pop 2020	% 1980	% 1990	% 2000	% 2010	% 2020
White alone (NH)	32,488	33,626	36,884	40,792	37,941	96.60%	95.40%	92.62%	90.34%	85.00%
Black or African American alone (NH)	296	396	586	977	1,028	0.88%	1.12%	1.47%	2.16%	2.30%
Native American or Alaska Native alone (NH)	81	141	226	221	231	0.24%	0.40%	0.57%	0.49%	0.52%
Asian alone (NH)	347	773	934	1,313	1,506	1.03%	2.19%	2.35%	2.91%	3.37%
Native Hawaiian or Pacific Islander alone (NH)	x	x	25	29	20	x	x	0.06%	0.06%	0.04%
Other race alone (NH)	128	9	26	27	230	0.38%	0.03%	0.07%	0.06%	0.52%
Mixed race or Multiracial (NH)	x	x	659	874	2,423	x	x	1.65%	1.94%	5.43%
Hispanic or Latino (any race)	293	303	485	923	1,259	0.87%	0.86%	1.22%	2.04%	2.82%
Total	33,633	35,248	39,825	45,156	44,638	100.00%	100.00%	100.00%	100.00%	100.00%

=== 2000 census ===
As of the 2000 United States census, 39,825 people, 15,683 households, and 10,240 families resided in the county. The population density was 59 people per square mile (23 people/km^{2}). The 17,501 housing units had an average density of 26 units per square mile (10/km^{2}). The racial makeup of the county was 93.24% White, 1.50% Black or African American, 0.59% Native American, 2.35% Asian, 0.06% Pacific Islander, 0.47% from other races, and 1.79% from two or more races. About 1.22% of the population were Hispanics or Latinos of any race.

Of the 15,683 households, 30.3% had children under 18 living with them, 52.7% were married couples living together, 9.5% had a female householder with no husband present, and 34.7% were not families. Around 28.6% of all households were made up of individuals, and 10.7% had someone living alone who was 65 or older. The average household size was 2.38 and the average family size was 2.92.

The county's age distribution was 23.7% under 18, 14.5% from 18 to 24, 26.1% from 25 to 44, 21.8% from 45 to 64, and 13.9% who were 65 or older. The median age was 35 years. For every 100 females, there were 103.2 males. For every 100 females 18 and over, there were 102.9 males.

The median income for a household in the county was $37,243, and for a family was $49,343. Males had a median income of $29,428 versus $19,893 for females. The per capita income for the county was $20,275. About 11.30% of families and 16.40% of the population were below the poverty line, including 19.00% of those under age 18 and 13.00% of those age 65 or over.

=== Religion ===
According to the Association of Religion Data Archives County Membership Report (2000), Phelps County is a part of the Bible Belt, with evangelical Protestantism being the majority religion. The most predominant denominations among residents in Phelps County who adhere to a religion are Southern Baptists (38.24%), Roman Catholics (11.43%), and Christian Churches and Churches of Christ (10.75%). The several smaller but often growing denominations, including Assemblies of God 5.5%, the United Methodist Church 5.0%, Church of Jesus Christ of Latter Day Saints 4.8%, Lutheran Church Missouri Synod 4.2%, Church of God (Anderson Indiana) 3.2%, Church of the Nazarene 1.7%, Jehovah's Witnesses 1.3%, Episcopal Church 1.2%, Seventh Day Adventist 0.9%, and the Orthodox Church 0.8%.

== Education ==
Of adults 25 years of age and older in Phelps County, 79.0% possess a high school diploma or higher, while 21.1% hold a bachelor's degree or higher as their highest educational attainment.

=== Public schools ===
- Newburg R-II School District – Newburg
  - Newburg Elementary School (K-06)
  - Newburg High School (07–12)
- Phelps County R-III School District – Edgar Springs
  - Phelps County Elementary School (K-08)
- Rolla School District 31 – Rolla
  - Colonel John B. Wyman Elementary School (Pre K-03)
  - Harry S. Truman Elementary School (Pre K-03)
  - Mark Twain Elementary School (Pre K-03)
  - Rolla Middle School (04–06)
  - Rolla Junior High School (07–08)
  - Rolla High School (09–12)
- St. James R-I School District – St. James
  - Lucy Wortham Elementary School (K-05)
  - St. James Middle School (06–08)
  - St. James High School (09–12)

=== Private schools ===
- KVC Missouri School – St. James – (01–12) – nonsectarian
- Rolla Seventh-day Adventist School – Rolla – (K-07) – Seventh-day Adventist
- St. Patrick Elementary School – Rolla – (PK-08) – Roman Catholic

=== Alternative and vocational schools ===
- B.W. Robinson State School – Rolla – (K-12) – Special Education
- Rolla Technical Center – Rolla – (11–12) – Vocational/Technical
- Rolla Technical Institute High School – Rolla – (09–12) – Vocational/Technical

=== Colleges and universities ===
- Missouri University of Science and Technology – formerly known as the University of Missouri-Rolla (UMR) – a public, four-year university
- Drury University – a satellite campus
- East Central College – a satellite campus
- Columbia College -a satellite campus (no longer active in Rolla)

=== Public libraries ===
- James Memorial Library
- Newburg Public Library
- Rolla Public Library

== Communities ==
=== Cities and towns ===
- Doolittle
- Edgar Springs
- Newburg
- Rolla (county seat)
- St. James

=== Unincorporated communities ===
- Arlington
- Beulah
- Blooming Rose
- Clementine
- Clinton
- Craddock
- Dillon
- Duke
- Elk Prairie
- Flag Spring
- Flat
- Jerome
- Northwye
- Powellville
- Rosati
- Royal
- Seaton
- Table Rock
- Vida
- Winkler
- Yancy Mills

== Politics ==
=== Local ===
Until recently, both the Republican and Democratic parties equally controlled politics at the local level in Phelps County. Currently, the Republican party holds all of the elected positions in the county.

Phelps County, Missouri

Elected countywide officials
Assessor	Tim Kean	Republican
Circuit Clerk	Marlaina Wallace	Republican
County Clerk	Laura Johnson	Republican
Collector	Faith Ann Barnes	Republican
Commissioner (presiding)	Joey Auxier	Republican
Commissioner (district 1)	Sherry Stites	Republican
Commissioner (district 2)	Gary Hicks	Republican
Coroner	Ernie Coverdell	Republican
Prosecuting Attorney	Brendon Fox	Republican
Public Administrator	Dana Sooter	Republican
Recorder	Robin Kordes	Republican
Sheriff	Michael Kirn	Republican
Surveyor	Terris Cates	Republican
Treasurer	Cathy Tipton	Republican

=== State ===
Phelps County is divided into four legislative districts in the Missouri House of Representatives, all of which are held by Republicans.

- District 62 — Currently is represented by Bruce Sassmann (R-Bland) and consists of the north-central part of the county.

Missouri House of Representatives — District 62 — Phelps County (2020)
Party	Candidate	Votes	%	±%
Republican	Bruce Sassmann	1,780	79.29%	
Democratic	Nancy Ragan	464	20.71%	

Missouri House of Representatives — District 62 — Phelps County (2018)
Party	Candidate	Votes	%	±%
Republican	Tom Hurst	1,428	77.44%	
Democratic	Ashley Fajowski	416	22.56%	

Missouri House of Representatives — District 62 — Phelps County (2016)
Party	Candidate	Votes	%	±%
Republican	Tom Hurst	1,873	100.00%	

Missouri House of Representatives — District 62 — Phelps County (2014)
Party	Candidate	Votes	%	±%
Republican	Tom Hurst	1,093	100.00%	+41.33

Missouri House of Representatives — District 62 — Phelps County (2012)
Party	Candidate	Votes	%	±%
Republican	Tom Hurst	1,205	58.67%	
Democratic	Greg Stratman	849	42.33%	

Past Gubernatorial Elections Results
Year	Republican	Democratic	Third Parties
2024	71.60% 13,690	25.90% 4,952	2.50% 477
2020	68.74% 13,408	28.80% 5,621	2.46% 497
2016	62.51% 11,633	33.14% 6,168	4.35% 809
2012	51.23% 9,282	45.65% 8,271	3.12% 565
2008	43.33% 8,485	53.28% 10,226	3.39% 481
2004	59.09% 10,970	39.54% 7,341	1.37% 254
2000	51.59% 8,280	45.77% 7,345	2.64% 424
1996	34.97% 5,342	62.55% 9,555	2.49% 380
1992	40.41% 6,687	59.59% 9,860	0.00% 0
1988	67.69% 9,610	31.26% 4,438	1.05% 149
1984	63.88% 8,897	36.12% 5,031	0.00% 0
1980	56.98% 7,701	42.58% 5,755	0.44% 60
1976	50.67% 6,307	49.25% 6,131	0.08% 10

- District 120 — Currently is represented by Jason Chipman (R- Steelville) and consists of the eastern part of the county, including St. James.

Missouri House of Representatives — District 120 — Phelps County (2020)
Party	Candidate	Votes	%	±%
Republican	Jason Chipman	4,700	75.73%	
Democratic	Theresa Scmitt	1,505	24.27%	

Missouri House of Representatives — District 120 — Phelps County (2018)
Party	Candidate	Votes	%	±%
Republican	Jason Chipman	3,740	72.21%	
Democratic	Theresa Scmitt	1,431	27.63%	

Missouri House of Representatives — District 120 — Phelps County (2016)
Party	Candidate	Votes	%	±%
Republican	Jason Chipman	5,254	100.00%	+28.77

Missouri House of Representatives — District 120 — Phelps County (2014)
Party	Candidate	Votes	%	±%
Republican	Jason Chipman	2,553	71.23%	+1.65
Democratic	Zechariah Hockersmith	1,031	28.77%	−1.65

Missouri House of Representatives — District 120 — Phelps County — Special Election (2013)
Party	Candidate	Votes	%	±%
Republican	Shawn Sisco	1,713	69.58%	−30.42
Democratic	Zechariah Hockersmith	749	30.42%	+30.42

Missouri House of Representatives — District 120 — Phelps County (2012)
Party	Candidate	Votes	%	±%
Republican	Jason T. Smith	4,860	100.00%	

- District 121 — Currently is represented by Don Mayhew (R-Crocker) and consists of the communities of Doolittle, Jerome, Newburg, and Rolla.

Missouri House of Representatives — District 121 — Phelps County (2020)
Party	Candidate	Votes	%	±%
Republican	Don Mayhew	7,984	96.26%	

Missouri House of Representatives — District 121 — Phelps County (2018)
Party	Candidate	Votes	%	±%
Republican	Don Mayhew	4,987	63.50%	
Democratic	Matt Heltz	2,845	36.23%	

Missouri House of Representatives — District 121 — Phelps County (2016)
Party	Candidate	Votes	%	±%
Republican	Keith Frederick	7,690	100.00%	

Missouri House of Representatives — District 121 — Phelps County (2014)
Party	Candidate	Votes	%	±%
Republican	Keith Frederick	4,075	100.00%	

Missouri House of Representatives — District 121 — Phelps County (2012)
Party	Candidate	Votes	%	±%
Republican	Keith Frederick	7,546	100.00%	

- District 142 — Currently is represented by Bennie Cook (R-Houston) and consists of the southeastern part of the county, including the communities of Beulah, Duke, and Edgar Springs.

Missouri House of Representatives — District 142 — Phelps County (2020)
Party	Candidate	Votes	%	±%
Republican	Bennie Cook	896	98.35%	

Missouri House of Representatives — District 142 — Phelps County (2018)
Party	Candidate	Votes	%	±%
Republican	Robert Ross	760	98.32%	

Missouri House of Representatives — District 142 — Phelps County (2016)
Party	Candidate	Votes	%	±%
Republican	Robert Ross	716	75.77%	−24.23
Democratic	Bobby Johnston, Jr.	229	24.23%	+24.23

Missouri House of Representatives — District 142 — Phelps County (2014)
Party	Candidate	Votes	%	±%
Republican	Robert Ross	460	100.00%	

Missouri House of Representatives — District 142 — Phelps County (2012)
Party	Candidate	Votes	%	±%
Republican	Robert Ross	792	100.00%	

All of Phelps County is a part of Missouri's 16th District in the Missouri Senate and is currently represented by Dan Brown (R-Rolla).

Missouri Senate — District 16 — Phelps County (2018)
Party	Candidate	Votes	%	±%
Republican	Dan Brown	10,025	62.78%	
Democratic	Ryan Dillon	5,908	37.00%	

Missouri Senate — District 16 — Phelps County (2014)
Party	Candidate	Votes	%	±%
Republican	Dan Brown	9,043	100.00%	

=== Federal ===
United States presidential election results for Phelps County, Missouri
Year	Republican		Democratic		Third party(ies)	
Year	No.	%	No.	%	No.	%
1888	685	31.34%	1,183	54.12%	318	14.55%
1892	883	37.01%	1,287	53.94%	216	9.05%
1896	1,038	36.19%	1,816	63.32%	14	0.49%
1900	1,153	40.64%	1,603	56.50%	81	2.86%
1904	1,371	47.46%	1,384	47.91%	134	4.64%
1908	1,520	45.00%	1,804	53.40%	54	1.60%
1912	782	27.77%	1,565	55.58%	469	16.65%
1916	1,487	43.44%	1,887	55.13%	49	1.43%
1920	2,692	52.25%	2,422	47.01%	38	0.74%
1924	2,085	37.91%	2,918	53.05%	497	9.04%
1928	2,967	50.51%	2,896	49.30%	11	0.19%
1932	1,794	26.70%	4,858	72.29%	68	1.01%
1936	2,690	36.44%	4,658	63.11%	33	0.45%
1940	3,319	40.90%	4,780	58.91%	15	0.18%
1944	3,180	42.69%	4,256	57.14%	13	0.17%
1948	3,053	36.89%	5,202	62.85%	22	0.27%
1952	4,694	49.13%	4,846	50.72%	14	0.15%
1956	4,773	50.06%	4,761	49.94%	0	0.00%
1960	5,663	55.31%	4,576	44.69%	0	0.00%
1964	3,755	39.40%	5,776	60.60%	0	0.00%
1968	5,577	47.33%	4,211	35.74%	1,995	16.93%
1972	7,598	68.05%	3,567	31.95%	0	0.00%
1976	6,153	49.18%	6,261	50.04%	98	0.78%
1980	7,366	54.30%	5,470	40.32%	730	5.38%
1984	9,012	63.98%	5,074	36.02%	0	0.00%
1988	8,329	58.44%	5,867	41.16%	57	0.40%
1992	6,040	36.08%	6,852	40.93%	3,847	22.98%
1996	6,990	45.70%	6,405	41.87%	1,902	12.43%
2000	9,444	58.49%	6,262	38.78%	440	2.73%
2004	11,874	63.50%	6,666	35.65%	160	0.86%
2008	11,706	59.96%	7,394	37.87%	424	2.17%
2012	11,895	65.05%	5,798	31.71%	593	3.24%
2016	12,709	67.92%	4,766	25.47%	1,238	6.62%
2020	13,480	68.89%	5,637	28.81%	451	2.30%
2024	13,658	70.77%	5,379	27.87%	263	1.36%

U.S. Senate — Missouri — Phelps County (2018)
Party	Candidate	Votes	%	±%
Republican	Josh Hawley	10,124	62.92%	
Democratic	Claire McCaskill	5,363	33.33%	
Libertarian	Japheth Campbell	255	1.58%	
Independent	Craig O'Dear	242	1.50%	
Green	Jo Crain	88	0.55%	

U.S. Senate — Missouri — Phelps County (2016)
Party	Candidate	Votes	%	±%
Republican	Roy Blunt	11,063	59.70%	+11.94
Democratic	Jason Kander	6,576	35.48%	−9.79
Libertarian	Jonathan Dine	533	2.88%	−4.09
Green	Johnathan Dine	193	1.04%	+1.04
Constitution	Fred Ryman	167	0.90%	+0.90

U.S. Senate — Missouri — Phelps County (2012)
Party	Candidate	Votes	%	±%
Republican	Todd Akin	8,579	47.76%	
Democratic	Claire McCaskill	8,133	45.27%	
Libertarian	Jonathan Dine	1,252	6.97%	

Phelps County is included in Missouri's 8th Congressional District and is currently represented by Jason T. Smith (R-Salem) in the U.S. House of Representatives. Smith won a special election on Tuesday, June 4, 2013, to finish the remaining term of U.S. Representative Jo Ann Emerson (R-Cape Girardeau). Emerson announced her resignation a month after being reelected with over 70 percent of the vote in the district. She resigned to become CEO of the National Rural Electric Cooperative.

U.S. House of Representatives — Missouri's 8th Congressional District — Phelps County (2020)
Party	Candidate	Votes	%	±%
Republican	Jason T. Smith	13,591	70.23%	
Democratic	Kathy Ellis	5,302	27.42%	
Libertarian	Tom Schmitz	456	2.35%	

U.S. House of Representatives — Missouri's 8th Congressional District — Phelps County (2018)
Party	Candidate	Votes	%	±%
Republican	Jason T. Smith	10,977	68.59%	
Democratic	Kathy Ellis	4,716	29.47%	
Libertarian	Jonathan Shell	302	1.89%	

U.S. House of Representatives — Missouri's 8th Congressional District — Phelps County (2016)
Party	Candidate	Votes	%	±%
Republican	Jason T. Smith	13,288	72.59%	+2.29
Democratic	Dave Cowell	4,453	24.33%	−0.27
Libertarian	Jonathan Shell	564	3.08%	+1.26

U.S. House of Representatives — Missouri's 8th Congressional District — Phelps County (2014)
Party	Candidate	Votes	%	±%
Republican	Jason T. Smith	7,387	70.30%	−3.69
Democratic	Barbara Stocker	2,585	24.60%	+0.08
Libertarian	Rick Vandeven	191	1.82%	+0.79
Constitution	Doug Enyart	133	1.27%	+0.81
Independent	Terry Hampton	212	2.02%	+2.02

U.S. House of Representatives — Missouri's 8th Congressional District — Phelps County (Special Election 2013)
Party	Candidate	Votes	%	±%
Republican	Jason T. Smith	3,084	73.99%	+0.40
Democratic	Steve Hodges	1,022	24.52%	+1.59
Libertarian	Bill Slantz	43	1.03%	−2.45
Constitution	Doug Enyart	19	0.46%	+0.46

U.S. House of Representatives — Missouri's 8th Congressional District — Phelps County (2012)
Party	Candidate	Votes	%	±%
Republican	Jo Ann Emerson	13,142	73.59%	
Democratic	Jack Rushin	4,095	22.93%	
Libertarian	Rick Vandeven	622	3.48%	

==== Political culture ====
At the presidential level, Phelps County is a fairly Republican-leaning county despite containing a relatively large university. George W. Bush easily carried Phelps County in 2000 and 2004. Bill Clinton was the last Democratic presidential nominee to carry Phelps County in 1992, and like many of the rural counties throughout Missouri, Phelps County favored John McCain over Barack Obama in 2008. It moved even further to the Right when it voted at record numbers for Donald Trump in 2016 and 2020. Trump received the most votes any candidate ever has, in Phelps County—for President—in 2020, and took 68% of the vote. In 2024, Trump became the first Republican in history to achieve over 70% of the vote, something that only one person had achieved before, that being Franklin D. Roosevelt during his overwhelming landslide in 1932.

Like most rural areas throughout central Missouri, voters in Phelps County generally adhere to socially and culturally conservative principles which tend to influence their Republican leanings. In 2004, Missourians voted on a constitutional amendment to define marriage as the union between a man and a woman—it overwhelmingly passed Phelps County with 77.94 percent of the vote. The initiative passed the state with 71 percent of support from voters as Missouri became the first state to ban same-sex marriage. In 2006, Missourians voted on a constitutional amendment to fund and legalize embryonic stem cell research in the state—it failed in Phelps County with 52.25 percent voting against the measure. The initiative narrowly passed the state with 51 percent of support from voters as Missouri became one of the first states in the nation to approve embryonic stem cell research. Despite Phelps County's longstanding tradition of supporting socially conservative platforms, voters in the county have a penchant for advancing populist causes like increasing the minimum wage. In 2006, Missourians voted on a proposition (Proposition B) to increase the minimum wage in the state to $6.50 an hour; it passed Phelps County with 69.42 percent of the vote. The proposition strongly passed every single county in Missouri with 78.99 percent voting in favor as the minimum wage was increased to $6.50 an hour in the state. During the same election, voters in five other states also strongly approved increases in the minimum wage.

== See also ==
- National Register of Historic Places listings in Phelps County, Missouri
