= The New York Community Trust =

Community foundation in New York City

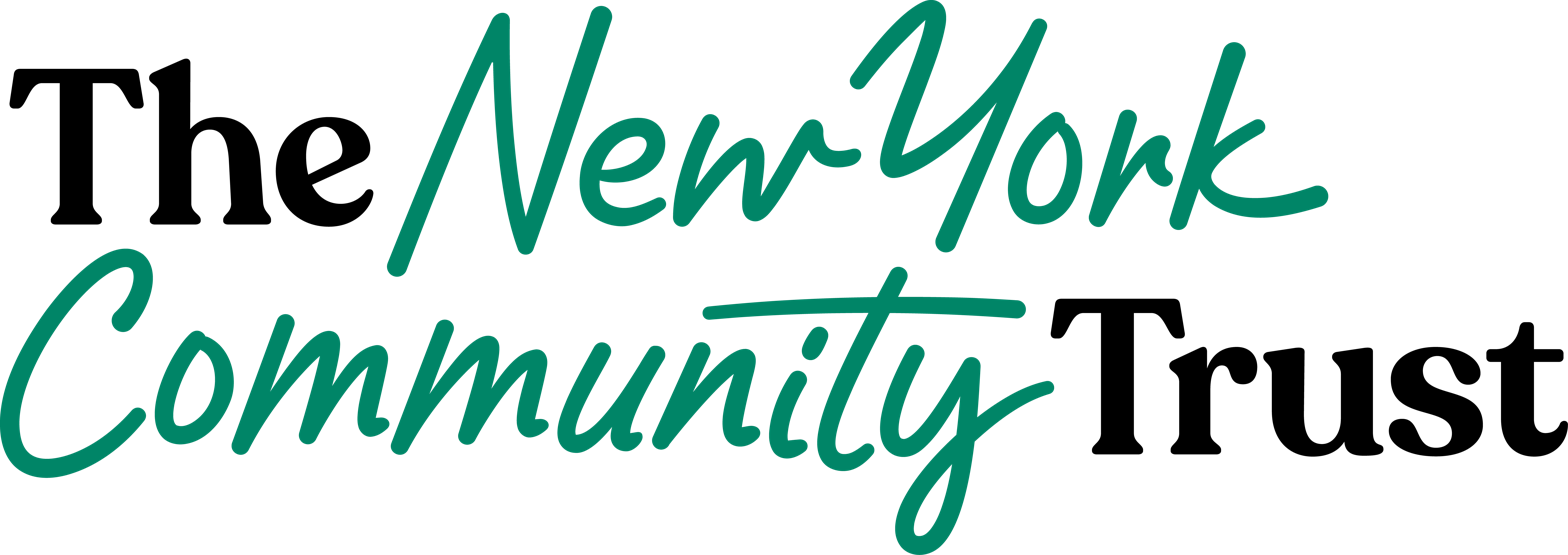
- Founded: 1924
- Type: 501(c)(3) charitable organization
- Tax ID no.: 13-3062214
- Purpose: Improving the quality of life for residents of New York City and the surrounding region through strategic philanthropy, community investment, and support for nonprofit organizations.
- Location(s): 909 Third Avenue; New York City, New York, U.S.
- Region served: New York City, Long Island, Westchester County
- Method: Grantmaking
- Key people: Amy Freitag, President
- Endowment: US$3.5 billion (2024)
- Website: thenytrust.org

The New York Community Trust (The Trust) is a major community foundation serving New York City’s five boroughs, Long Island, and Westchester County. It administers over 2,200 charitable funds, manages approximately US$3.5 billion in assets (2024), and makes about US$200 million in grants annually. Since its inception in 1924, the Trust has awarded more than US$5.8 billion to nonprofits. It is a 501(c)(3) public charity headquartered in Manhattan, with offices in Irvington and Commack, NY. It is led by its fourth president, Amy Freitag (appointed 2022).

== History ==
=== 1920s–1930s ===
The New York Community Trust was established in the early 1920s as one of the nation’s first community foundations, modeled after the Cleveland Foundation, to provide New Yorkers with a permanent and flexible vehicle for charitable giving. It was legally structured to allow donors to create permanent funds, with income distributed to support a range of nonprofits in New York City.

In 1923, the Trust appointed Ralph Hayes as its first executive director. Hayes had previously been a key organizer at the Cleveland Foundation and brought to the Trust a vision for long-term civic stewardship through public-private partnerships. Under his leadership, the Trust professionalized its grant-making practices, expanded its donor base, and helped establish the national model for community foundations. When Hayes retired in the 1960s, the Trust had grown into a philanthropic institution with more than US$60 million in assets.

In 1924, the Trust made its first grant from a fund that Rosebel G. Schiff, a New Yorker, created with a US$1,000 gift. Following Schiff’s wishes, the grant was made to honor a high-achieving student at P.S. 9, a girls’ public school in Manhattan.

In 1931, the Trust established the first donor-advised fund (DAF), a type of charitable fund that allows an individual, family, or corporation to set up a named fund sponsored by a 501(c)(3) public charity. The institution holding the fund makes the grants and invests the principal of the fund to grow over time. Donors use their funds to recommend grants to nonprofits during their lifetime. The couple who set up the first DAF left their fund’s remainder to the Trust after their death to be used in perpetuity for strategic grant-making. This model combines the flexibility of private foundations with the administrative ease of public charities and has become one of the most widely used charitable giving vehicles in the country.

Throughout the 1920s and 1930s, the Trust received several substantial gifts from the estate plans of people who wanted to invest in the future of the region. One of these was Laura Spelman Rockefeller. During this time, the Trust began making grants to address the hardships brought on by the Great Depression. It supported relief efforts in New York City and helped stabilize social-service organizations facing increased demand. This period set the precedent for the Trust’s ongoing role responding to urgent civic and humanitarian needs.

=== 1940s–1970s ===
During the 1940s, the Trust began managing legacy gifts with geographically diverse mandates. One notable bequest from Lucy Wortham James supported both New York City organizations and conservation efforts in rural Missouri. James’ estate helped preserve Maramec Spring Park, now owned and operated by the James Foundation, an affiliate of The New York Community Trust, in St. James, Missouri.

Beginning in 1957, the Trust funded the Heritage of New York Plaque Program in partnership with the Municipal Art Society and the New York City Landmarks Preservation Commission. Hundreds of historically significant buildings, including Grand Central Terminal, Bowery Savings Bank, and the New York Stock Exchange, were marked with prominent plaques.

In the mid-1960s, the Trust provided early funding to support the Public Theater, originally founded as the Shakespeare Workshop in 1954 and later led by Joseph Papp. The Trust’s seed grants funded capital improvements, including performance upgrades at the Delacorte Theater, facilitating the growth of Shakespeare in the Park and the emergence of community-centered arts programming.

The Trust’s early grantmaking contributed to the founding of advocacy groups focused on urban development, environmental justice, and historic preservation. For instance, the Trust’s partnership with the Municipal Art Society of New York inspired collaborations that would later become organizations such as the Natural Resources Defense Council and the Historic Districts Council.

By the 1970s, the Trust managed hundreds of charitable funds. Operating with the understanding that grantmaking is best done locally, the Trust expanded by establishing the Westchester Community Foundation (1975) and the Long Island Community Foundation (1978) to serve Westchester, Suffolk, and Nassau counties. During this period, the Trust also provided early support for energy conservation in response to the 1970s energy crisis, as well as for mental health services, programs for older adults, and cultural revitalization efforts, all amid the twin pressures of fiscal austerity and social need in New York City.

=== 1980s–1990s ===
In the 1980s, the New York Community Trust was among the first philanthropies to respond to the HIV/AIDS crisis. It made its first HIV research grant in 1983 and subsequently helped establish the New York City AIDS Fund (1989–2014). Fundraising efforts by the fashion industry, including Seventh on Sale and Fashion’s Night Out, drove visibility and contributions to the AIDS Fund. Over its 25-year lifespan, the New York City AIDS Fund distributed more than US$20 million to grassroots and citywide organizations, helped scale needle exchange programs, supported public education campaigns, and provided sustained support to LGBTQ+ New Yorkers and communities of color disproportionately impacted by the epidemic.

During the same era, the Trust backed a strategic advocacy effort with the Campaign for Fiscal Equity (CFE). It provided funding for research and recommendations to improve New York State’s school funding system. A lawsuit filed in 1993 successfully argued that the state was failing to provide New York City students with the “sound basic education” mandated by the state’s constitution. The 2003 New York Court of Appeals ruling led to the implementation of the Foundation Aid Formula, resulting in billions of additional dollars in state funding for city schools. The Trust provided grants to education advocacy organizations through the 2010s and 2020s to bolster transparency in state school aid budgeting, county-level impact analysis, and grassroots lobbying for full Foundation Aid compliance.

Following the 1986 federal immigration reforms, the Trust formed the Fund for New Citizens, a collaborative fund that pooled contributions from several foundations. The fund supported legal services, organizing, and integration programs for immigrants.

The Energy Conservation Fund at The Trust was established in 1979 and was originally funded with a US$15 million restitution from the New York State Energy Research and Development Authority. It helped nonprofits implement energy-efficient projects in their facilities. Over time, it evolved into the Nonprofit Finance Fund, which has supported more than US$100 million in capital improvements across nonprofit facilities.

=== 2000s: Disaster Relief, Legal Advocacy, and Systemic Reform ===
In the aftermath of the September 11 attacks, under the leadership of then-President Lorie Slutsky, The New York Community Trust co-founded The September 11th Fund with the United Way of New York City. The effort distributed US$528 million in assistance to victims’ families, displaced workers, small businesses, and area nonprofits through more than 559 grants. It supported a wide range of recovery efforts, including cash assistance to victims’ families, mental-health counseling, support for displaced workers, rebuilding services for small businesses, and capacity grants to frontline nonprofits. The fund concluded in 2004.

A notable highlight of the Trust’s work to reform criminal justice in New York City is its early support for the movement to close Rikers Island, New York City’s main jail complex. Beginning in 2015, the Trust funded advocacy organizations that participated in the local campaign, such as JustLeadershipUSA, the Women’s Community Justice Association, and the Freedom Agenda.

In 2019, the New York City Council approved an US$8 billion plan to shutter Rikers and build four borough-based jails. The Trust sustained funding into 2023, including a multi-year grant supporting the Beyond Rosie’s Campaign, aimed at closing Rikers’ women’s jail, the Rose M. Singer Center, amid serious concerns about violence and inadequate conditions.

The Trust also funded projects that addressed the school-to-prison pipeline, mental health, and alternatives to incarceration. It supported advocacy and community organizing efforts that helped pass New York’s “Raise the Age” legislation in 2017, which ended the automatic prosecution of 16- and 17-year-olds as adults in criminal court. It also supported litigation that reshaped New York State’s foster-care system and co-launched collaborative efforts to build the nonprofit workforce.

=== 2010s: Civic Resilience and Strategic Philanthropy ===
In 2012, the Trust was selected by the New York State Attorney General’s Office to administer US$45 million from philanthropist Brooke Astor’s estate to improve literacy across the five boroughs. The Trust established the Brooke Astor Funds for New York City Education with the purpose of improving literacy in the early grades across the five boroughs by awarding grants to nonprofits serving public elementary schools in low-income neighborhoods. In partnership with the NYC DOE and an advisory panel (including representatives from the Coalition for Asian American Children and Families, NYU Steinhardt, and the Harvard Graduate School of Education), the initiative focused on intensive teacher training, early-grade curriculum development, after-school literacy programs, and teacher coaching.

In 2015, the Trust launched the Leadership Fellows program in partnership with Baruch College’s Austin W. Marxe School of Public and International Affairs. Geared toward mid-career nonprofit professionals, the program combines classroom learning, mentorship, project work, and an engaged alumni network. As of 2025, more than 600 fellows from over 250 New York-area nonprofits have participated, receiving leadership training and support to advance their organizations’ social-justice missions.

=== 2020s: COVID-19, Migrant Response, and Centennial Milestone ===
In March 2020, in response to the COVID-19 pandemic, The New York Community Trust partnered with Bloomberg Philanthropies, the Ford Foundation, the Carnegie Corporation of New York, and others to launch the NYC COVID-19 Response & Impact Fund. The initiative raised over US$110 million, drawing support from a coalition of more than 700 institutional funders and individual donors, including many New Yorkers who contributed through a dedicated giving platform. The fund disbursed more than 760 grants and 45 no-interest loans to support frontline nonprofits providing emergency food, health care, mental health services, remote-learning access, and cultural programming. It served as one of the largest philanthropic responses to the pandemic in New York City and helped stabilize organizations facing sharp increases in demand and major revenue losses.

In 2022, Amy Freitag became the Trust’s fourth president, bringing experience in NYC government, conservation, philanthropy, and historic preservation. Under her leadership, the Trust celebrated its 100th anniversary in 2024. That same year, it partnered with the Robin Hood Foundation to lead philanthropic efforts supporting more than 200,000 immigrants who had arrived in New York City during a housing and services crisis.

To streamline operations and branding, the Trust consolidated its Westchester and Long Island divisions in 2024, bringing them under a single identity. That same year, the Trust won two awards for its rebranding, including a Transform and Change Order Award. On the programmatic side, it also celebrated environmental milestones, most notably funding partnerships that contributed to measurable improvements in Long Island Sound cleanup, including ecosystem monitoring and wastewater management efforts in collaboration with Save the Sound and other local groups.

== Leadership ==
Since its founding in 1920, The New York Community Trust has been led by a few long-serving executives who shaped the Trust’s role in the civic and philanthropic life of the New York metropolitan area.

- Ralph Hayes (Director, 1923–1967)

A key architect of the Trust’s early growth, Ralph Hayes was previously affiliated with the Cleveland Foundation and brought national prominence to the community foundation model in New York. Under his four decades of leadership, the Trust expanded its assets from modest beginnings to tens of millions of dollars and established itself as a respected civic institution. Hayes was widely regarded as a pioneer in organized philanthropy and passed away in 1977.

- Herbert Buell West (President, 1967–1990)

Herbert Buell West oversaw significant financial and programmatic growth. Under his presidency, the Trust’s assets grew more than tenfold—from around US$60 million to over US$750 million—and the foundation established regional offices in Long Island and Westchester.

- Lorie A. Slutsky (President, 1990–2022)

Lorie Slutsky was the Trust’s first female president and one of the most prominent community foundation leaders in the United States. Over her 32-year tenure, she expanded the Trust’s grantmaking to exceed US$200 million annually and broadened its programmatic reach into areas such as criminal justice, immigrant services, and environmental resilience.

- Amy Freitag (President, 2022–present)

Amy Freitag is the fourth president of the Trust. A veteran of the philanthropic and conservation sectors, Freitag previously led the J.M. Kaplan Fund and held leadership roles at the New York City Department of Parks and Recreation and the World Monuments Fund. In a 2024 WNYC interview, Freitag emphasized the Trust’s evolving role in “helping New York tackle its hardest problems,” from pandemic recovery to the housing and migration crises.

== Governance and Financials ==
As of 2024, the Trust’s board is chaired by Jamie Drake, a nationally recognized interior designer and public advocate. He is the twelfth person to serve as board chair in the Trust’s history.

Current members of the Distribution Committee oversee grantmaking policy, investment strategy, and long-term philanthropic stewardship. The Trust publishes its annual financial statements and audited reports on its website.

== Program Areas and Impact ==
The New York Community Trust supports nonprofits across New York City, Long Island, and Westchester through a combination of donor-advised funds, competitive grants, and collaborative giving initiatives. The Trust balances funding long-term systemic challenges like education, climate, and justice with responses to urgent civic needs, including disaster relief and pandemic recovery.

Its competitive grants program targets strategic, place-based issues. In Westchester, this includes funding for ecological resilience and civic justice projects such as youth civic engagement, exemplified by the Peekskill fellowship program. In Long Island, competitive grants address affordable housing and mental health needs through grantees such as the Uniondale Community Land Trust, which received funding to acquire foreclosed properties for affordable homeownership, and Northwell Health, which used Trust support to enhance mental health screenings in schools.

Additionally, the Trust co-leads regional funder collaboratives and pooled funds, such as those supporting immigrants, civic affairs, the health of the Long Island Sound, and more. These complement its donor-advised and discretionary grantmaking and use community-informed research to measure and sustain impact.

=== Core Program Areas (Competitive Grants Program) ===
The following areas reflect the priorities of The New York Community Trust’s competitive grants program, which distributes funding to nonprofits across New York City, Long Island, and Westchester. These grants are awarded based on community needs, organizational capacity, and alignment with program goals. While all regions share overarching focus areas, each division may prioritize distinct strategies or populations based on local context.

- Health & Behavioral Health: Access to mental health care, maternal and infant health services, aging support, and HIV/AIDS prevention and treatment.
- Children & Teens: Early childhood education, public school equity, literacy interventions, and high-quality out-of-school programming.
- Environment: Urban conservation, climate resilience, energy efficiency, and the protection of local biodiversity.
- Arts: Expanding access to the arts, arts education, and cultural equity initiatives in historically underrepresented communities.
- Housing & Economic Opportunity: Career readiness programs, workforce equity, reentry support for formerly incarcerated individuals, and support for small business development.
- Immigrant & Refugee Support: Legal assistance, policy advocacy, and integration services for newly arrived and undocumented New Yorkers.
- Justice & Democracy: Support for voting rights, criminal justice reform, gender equity, and civil liberties protection.
- LGBTQ+ New Yorkers: Health services, housing, and legal advocacy for LGBTQ+ communities.
- Older Adults & People with Disabilities: Improving accessibility in housing and transit, strengthening transportation networks, and advancing healthcare system reform for seniors and people with disabilities.

== Regional Impact: Long Island & Westchester ==
=== Long Island Office ===
In 2025, The Trust’s Long Island office awarded more than US$523,000 in competitive grants to support 19 local nonprofits addressing critical regional challenges, including monitoring water quality, advancing affordable housing, expanding STEM education, and piloting restorative-justice programs for teens.

For example, Uniondale Community Land Trust received funding to acquire foreclosed properties and advance affordable homeownership; a US$23,000 award supported Huntington Youth Court, a peer-led alternative to juvenile justice; and Northwell Health received digital-platform funding to enhance mental-health screening and care in schools.

The Trust’s Long Island office was also named “Best Philanthropist” in the *Best of Long Island* Awards for the third consecutive year in 2025.

The Long Island Unitarian Universalist Fund (LIUU Fund), housed at the Trust and one of the region’s key collaborative funds, supports grassroots organizing, social-justice advocacy, and youth-leadership development in Nassau and Suffolk counties. Through the LIUU Fund, the Trust also administers the Long Island Racial Justice Fund and the Long Island Sound Stewardship Fund, which back community-led initiatives to advance racial equity and environmental sustainability in the region.

It funded the creation of the Long Island Zoning Atlas, which maps barriers to affordable housing across Nassau and Suffolk counties. These tools have informed regional funding strategies and supported legislative conversations around housing equity.

=== Westchester Office ===
The Trust’s Westchester office is bolstering equity through data-driven tools.

In 2022, it launched Westchester Index, a public equity dashboard measuring 62 community indicators—such as housing burden, life expectancy, educational attainment, and civic participation—designed to guide grantmaking and public policy across the county.

In 2023, the Trust introduced narrative “data stories” linking Index findings to real-life experiences. These include stories on housing inequality in Mount Vernon and food insecurity in Yonkers, used by local nonprofits and municipal leaders to support advocacy and funding strategies.

In 2025, the office awarded US$702,000 in grants in partnership with grassroots organizations to address urgent needs such as local journalism and bolster nonprofit capacity in food security, housing, and youth programs. In Peekskill, a US$100,000 grant supported a pilot civic-fellowship program pairing local teens with community boards and advocacy campaigns. Students received stipends and training in public speaking, local governance, and civic-media storytelling.

== Centennial and Community Engagement ==
In 2024, The Trust launched “Our Votes, Our Vision, Our Community,” a centennial-driven initiative that channeled US$3 million in grants to nonprofits addressing issues selected by public vote from across New York City, Long Island, and Westchester. Based on the voting outcomes, the grants supported affordable housing, mental-health and substance-use services, and nonprofit resilience.

The centennial year also featured celebratory programming, including the “100 Things You Didn’t Know About New York” campaign and public discussions reflecting on a century of civic impact.
