= KDAA =

- Rolla, Missouri; United States
- Broadcast area: Rolla, Waynesville, Salem, Missouri
- Frequency: 103.1 MHz
- Branding: 103.1 Jack FM

Programming
- Format: Adult hits
- Affiliations: Westwood One

Ownership
- Owner: KTTR-KZNN, Inc. (known as Results Radio)
- Sister stations: KTTR, KTTR-FM, KXMO-FM, KZNN

History
- First air date: November 20, 1964
- Former call signs: KCLU-FM (1964–1989); KQMX (1989–1995)
- Former frequencies: 94.3 MHz (1964–1995); 97.5 MHz (1995–2006)

Technical information
- Licensing authority: FCC
- Facility ID: 53649
- Class: A
- ERP: 2,050 watts
- HAAT: 174 meters (571 ft)
- Transmitter coordinates: 37°52′39″N 91°44′45″W

Links
- Public license information: Public file; LMS
- Webcast: Listen live
- Website: Official website

KDAA (103.1 FM) is a radio station broadcasting an adult hits music format. Licensed to Rolla, Missouri, United States, the station is currently owned by KTTR-KZNN, Inc., known as "Results Radio."

JACK FM 103.1 is majority automated just like other syndicated JACK FM stations, but features local traffic/news/weather from Results Radio, provided by meteorologists from KYTV-TV in Springfield, MO.

== History ==
The station signed on and was assigned the call letters KCLU-FM on November 20, 1964. It signed on at 94.3 FM around the same time as a simulcast of top-40 sister KCLU 1590. As FM had overtaken AM and KCLU 1590 was a daytimer, it needed the FM as a way to stay competitive. Despite having a more current sound than its adult-focused competitor, KCLU was relentlessly hammered by KTTR 1490 as the station that would "run down at sundown." The transmitter went up at the studio site at US 63 and I-44 adjacent to the present-day Drury Inn. The tower is still present, though the "KCLU" logo at the bottom and the FM bays for the transmitter has long since been taken down. Although, country has always been king in Rolla, KCLU built up a loyal following among the younger audience throughout most of the decade. However, ownership became less willing to spend money on the station, and it found itself a CHR when no one wanted to be a CHR in 1988, which replaced their adult contemporary format that was used since the 1970s. As an AC affiliate, KCLU is one out of the two former Rolla area affiliates for Rick Dees Weekly Top 40 in the 1980s, with the other being KFBD-FM in nearby Waynesville.

On February 10, 1989, the station changed its call sign to KQMX and adopted and returned back to its former adult contemporary format programming approach as "Mix 94." Mix 94 kept the format for about two and a half years but failed to catch fire. In late 1992, the station changed formats, this time to classic rock as "94.3 The Max" while retaining the KQMX calls. In mid-1995, the station moved frequencies to 97.5 to make way for the upgrade of KZMO-FM California, which had become KATI. It briefly kept the classic rock format only to flip back to AC on October 1, 1995 as KDAA "K-Day." On July 17, 2000, the station's license was transferred from Eikon Media, Inc. to KDAA-KMOZ, LLC, along with the license for KMOZ. In mid-2006, KDAA swapped frequencies with a construction permit at 103.1 in Linn, MO, which is the present-day KJMO, in order to facilitate an upgrade of KHZR 97.7 in Potosi. On September 26, 2006, the licenses for KDAA and sister station KXMO-FM were transferred to the current owner, KTTR-KZNN, Inc., for $825,000.

During the Labor Day weekend of 2015, 103.1, following the shutdown of the Sam FM network, shifted to the Jack FM network.
