= KTTR =

KTTR may refer to:

- KTTR (AM), a radio station (1490 AM) licensed to serve Rolla, Missouri, United States
- KTTR-FM, a radio station (99.7 FM) licensed to serve St. James, Missouri
- KTTR-LP, a defunct low-power radio station (95.5 FM) formerly licensed to serve Quinlan, Texas, United States
