= KTTR-FM =

- St. James, Missouri; United States
- Broadcast area: Rolla, Missouri; Cuba, Missouri; Owensville, Missouri
- Frequency: 99.7 MHz
- Branding: KTTR NewsRadio

Programming
- Format: Talk
- Affiliations: Fox Sports Radio; Premiere Networks

Ownership
- Owner: Results Radio; (KTTR-KZNN, Inc.)
- Sister stations: KDAA, KTTR, KXMO, KZNN

History
- First air date: November 26, 1947

Technical information
- Licensing authority: FCC
- Facility ID: 35683
- Class: C3
- ERP: 12,000 watts
- HAAT: 144 meters (472 ft)
- Transmitter coordinates: 38°04′14.0″N 91°39′53.0″W

Links
- Public license information: Public file; LMS
- Website: KTTR-FM Online

KTTR-FM is a Talk formatted broadcast radio station licensed to St. James, Missouri, serving the Rolla/Cuba/Owensville area. Besides carrying The Rush Limbaugh Show the station airs The Sean Hannity Show, The Dave Ramsey Show, and The Jim Bohannon Show. KTTR-FM is owned and operated by Results Radio.
