= KXMO-FM =

Radio station in Owensville, Missouri

- Owensville, Missouri; United States
- Broadcast area: Sullivan, Missouri; Rolla, Missouri
- Frequency: 95.3 MHz
- Branding: 95.3 KXMO

Programming
- Format: Classic hits
- Affiliations: Westwood One

Ownership
- Owner: KTTR-KZNN, Inc.
- Sister stations: KZNN, KDAA, KTTR-FM, KTTR

History
- First air date: 2001

Technical information
- Licensing authority: FCC
- Facility ID: 84271
- Class: C2
- ERP: 37,000 watts
- HAAT: 172 meters (564 ft)
- Transmitter coordinates: 38°08′08″N 91°24′01″W

Links
- Public license information: Public file; LMS
- Webcast: Listen live
- Website: resultsradioonline.com

KXMO-FM (95.3 MHz) is a radio station airing a classic hits format licensed to Owensville, Missouri. The station is owned by KTTR-KZNN, Inc.

== History ==
KXMO-FM began broadcasting in 2001, airing an oldies format. In 2018, they switched to a classic hits format, playing songs from the 70s and 80s. They also adapted the slogan, “Your Classic Hits Station”.

KXMO features hourly weather updates from KYTV-TV “KY3” in Springfield, Missouri.
