= Lucy Wortham James =

American philanthropist

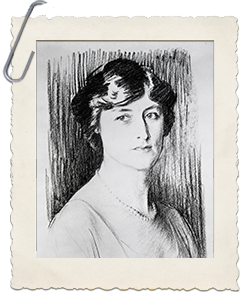

Lucy Wortham James (September 13, 1880 – January 20, 1938) was an American philanthropist. She dedicated her life to helping others and funding medical research. Her most memorial donation was land, part of Maramec Springs, which is now a park open to the public and maintained by the James Foundation.

== Early life ==
James was born in St. James, Missouri, to Thomas James and Octavia Bowles James and was a descendant of the family who established the Maramec Iron Works. Maramec Iron Works was developed by her grandfather, William James, and started the beginning of iron production in Missouri, the first successful ironworks west of the Mississippi river. The ironworks went bankrupt before James was born. Due to the bankruptcy, James grew up in South Dakota for her father's new job as a fur trader till the age of three. However, she spent her summers at Maramec Spring with her grandmother, Lucy Ann Dun James. Then, her mother started experiencing horrible health issues and decided to come back to St. James.

== Personal life ==
James' uncle, Robert G. Dun, paid for her education. James studied in Kansas City, New York, and even studied abroad in Vienna. She was studying to become a concert pianist while in Vienna and studied up Theodor Leschetizky. At the age of 23, she married Huntington Wilson. They spent their time together traveling the world. They divorced 12 years later with no children. She then resided in New York City. Dun had died, leaving a large portion of shares for his reporting agency, Dun & Bradstreet to James' father. Due to legal issues, he was unable to receive them. In 1912, she inherited her father’s shares after a drawn out legal process. She spent her time between New York City and St. James. She was a member of the New York Theatre Guild and was accepted in the high society life of New York. She was also equally accepted in St. James, despite the small town’s dislike for "big city rich folks."

== Philanthropy ==
With the money she inherited, she started helping multiple organizations which included the trinity Episcopal Church, the Masonic Cemetery, and the public library of St. James in Missouri. She campaigned for President Taft during his re-election year. She wanted to help those that were less fortunate than her and was involved with helping the elderly, African-Americans, and made charitable contributions for medical research. She gave money to help build the Johns Hopkins Woman's Clinic, where they would focus on gynecology. She also financed the first budget and experimental animal quarters for Memorial Hospital in New York.

== Illness and death ==
On a tour in Central and South America with her husband, James experienced a severe attack of altitude sickness. Once she was home, she was treated at Johns Hopkins University Hospital. Her health never fully recovered and was failing for multiple years. She suffered from nephritis and had a serious calcium deficiency associated with her tuberculosis. In 1929, she underwent surgery, but never fully recovered. However, she continued to make arrangements with The James Foundation to secure a future for the goals she still wanted to reach while continuing to fight the disease. In 1938, at the age of 58, James died in New York City.

== Legacy ==
Before James’s death, she bought three land sections, over thirteen hundred acres, in Phelps and Crawford counties. This included the Maramec Spring area that was once the site of Maramec Iron Works. She did not allow or accept any proposals from companies that wanted to run a state highway or power transmission line through the land. Her reasoning behind purchasing the land, was that it is "a spot of great natural beauty". This is when she input the first funds into the Lucy Wortham James Memorial, also known as the James Foundation. Once she had died, she left a portion of her estate to The New York Community Trust to continue her philanthropic interests, which included opening Maramec Spring as a private park that was open to the public. The park was opened in 1965. During the same time as the opening, the foundation built James Memorial Library, gained 56 more acres to the park, and built a swimming pool and fishing lake. There was also small amount of grants given to the Phelps County Memorial Hospital, the Boy Scouts, civic groups, and the Trinity Episcopal Church.
