= KTTR (AM) =

- Rolla, Missouri; United States
- Broadcast area: Phelps County, Missouri
- Frequency: 1490 kHz
- Branding: "ESPN 104.9 / 1490"

Programming
- Format: Sports
- Affiliations: ESPN Radio; Premiere Networks

Ownership
- Owner: Results Radio; (KTTR-KZNN, Inc.)
- Sister stations: KDAA, KTTR-FM, KXMO-FM, KZNN

Technical information
- Licensing authority: FCC
- Facility ID: 35681
- Class: C
- Power: 1,000 watts
- Transmitter coordinates: 37°56′42.0″N 91°44′46.0″W
- Translator: 104.9 K285GX (Rolla)

Links
- Public license information: Public file; LMS
- Website: KTTR Online

KTTR (1490 kHz) is a sports formatted broadcast radio station licensed to Rolla, Missouri, serving Rolla and Phelps County, Missouri. KTTR is owned and operated by Results Radio.
