= St. James Chapel (St. James, Missouri) =

Historic church in Missouri, United States

- U.S. National Register of Historic Places
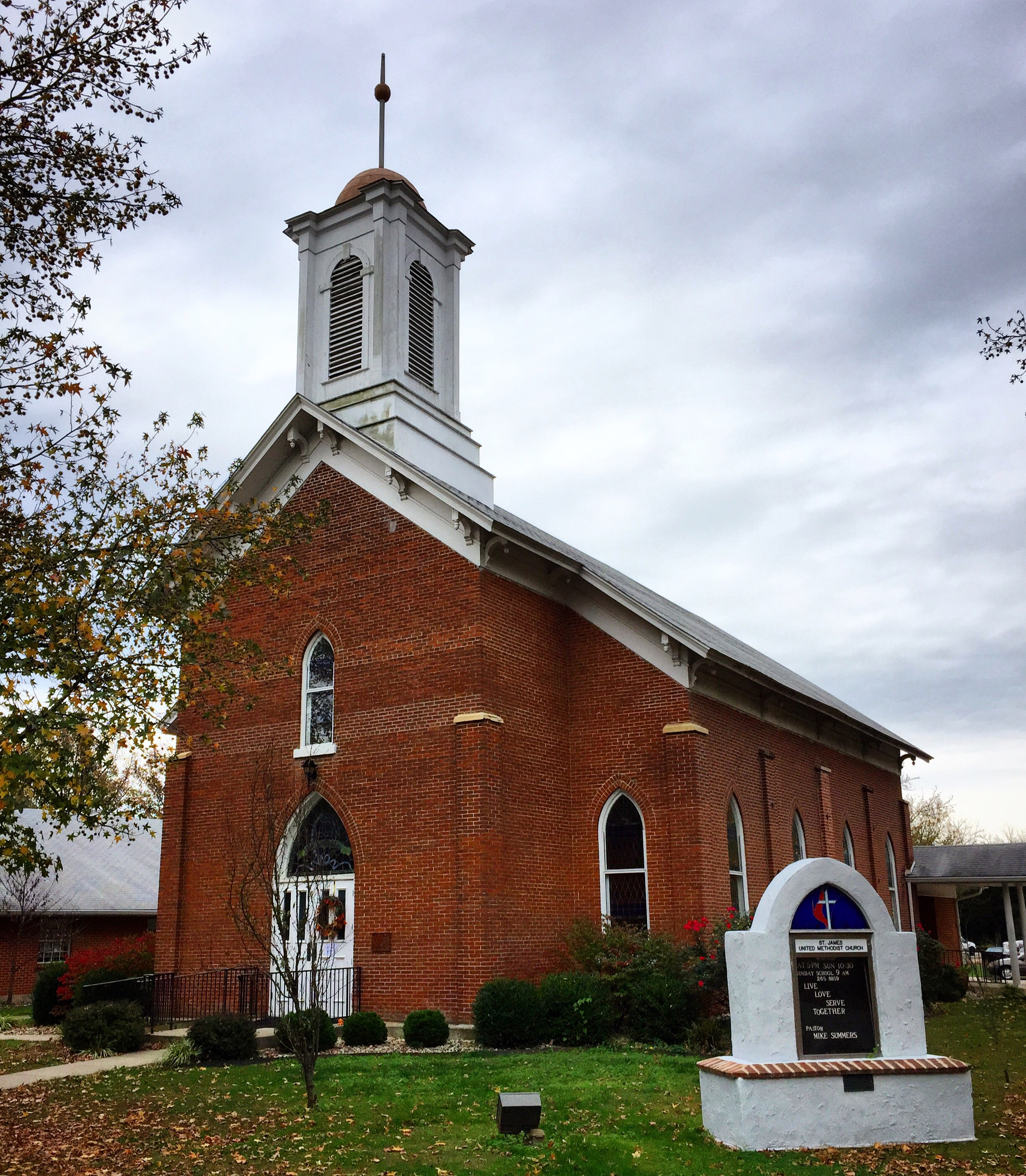
- St. James Chapel, November 2016

- Location within Missouri Location within the United States
- Location: Church and Meramec Sts., St. James, Missouri
- Coordinates: 37°59′38″N 91°36′49″W
- Area: less than one acre
- Built: 1868
- Architectural style: Romanesque, Gothic Revival
- NRHP reference No.: 83001035
- Added to NRHP: July 28, 1983

St. James Chapel, also known as the St. James United Methodist Church, is a historic Methodist chapel located at St. James, Phelps County, Missouri. It was built in 1868, and is a one-story red brick building with Gothic Revival and Romanesque Revival style design elements. It measures 40 feet by 60 feet, and has a gable roof. It features a bell tower topped by a dome.

It was listed on the National Register of Historic Places in 1970.
