= Mayme Ousley =

American politician (1887–1970)

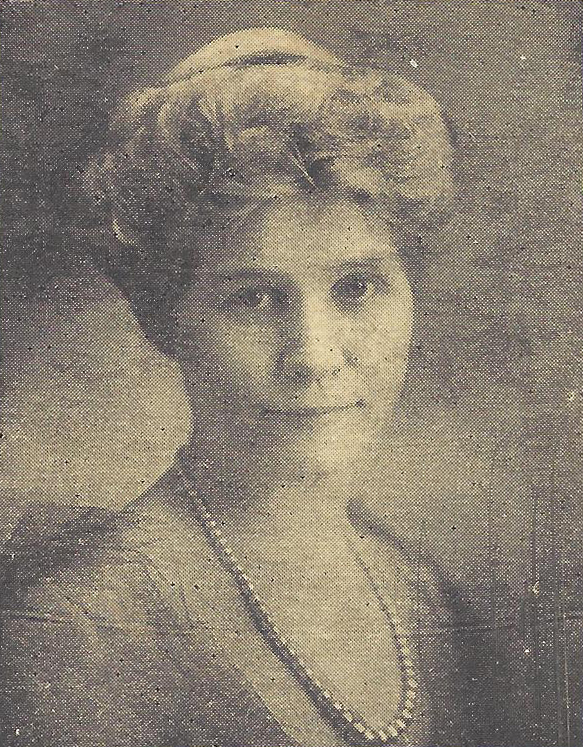
Mayme Hanrahan Ousley

Mayme Hanrahan Ousley (January 2, 1887 – October 29, 1970) was the mayor of St. James, Missouri on several occasions. At her election in 1921, she was the first elected woman mayor in Missouri.

== Life and career ==
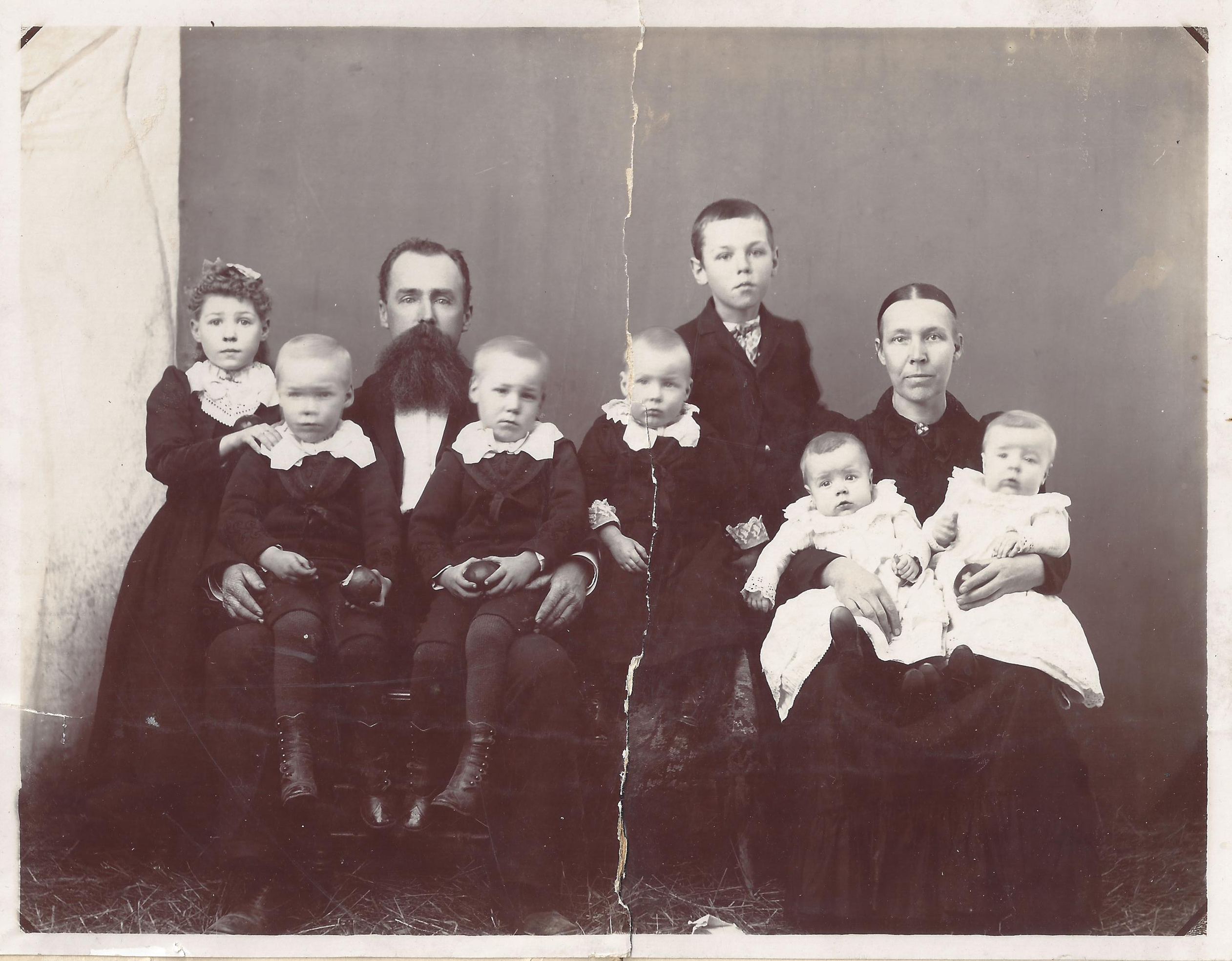
Thomas Martin and Rebecca Jane Hanrahan family portrait from 1895 or 1896 - Mayme Hanrahan is standing far left.

Mayme Hanrahan was born in the town of Edgar Springs, in Phelps County, and grew up in the county seat, Rolla. In 1905 she married fellow Phelps County native Edward William "Ed" Ousley, a 1906 graduate of the dental school of Washington University in St. Louis. That year the couple moved to St. James, where Edward opened a dental practice and where they would remain for the rest of their adult lives. They soon became active in many local civic organizations, and Dr. Ousley joined the town's semi-professional baseball team. His wife accompanied them on the road as they played. She often scolded them about their appearance; the resulting nickname, “Granny” Ousley, stuck with her. The Ousleys were also heavily involved in the local activities of the Republican Party, and in 1921 Mayme allowed herself to be persuaded to run for mayor. It is said that the catalyst for her run was the placing of a local boy, Jimmie Blank, in the Rolla jail, prior to his being sent to reform school. Ousley claimed that when she went to bring him back, she asked why it was imperative that he be sent away without a further hearing; upon receiving an unsatisfactory answer, she retrieved the boy and began planning her run, claiming that "the only way I knew of finding out the things I wanted to know was to become may”r."

As part of her campaign, Ousley promised to draw one dollar a month in salary; she spent six weeks going door to door asking women for their vote. The tactic was a success; turnout was such on Election Day that more ballots had to be printed, and in the end Ousley won by eight votes. So angry was the incumbent, J. J. Forester, at being defeated by a woman that he did not attend the council meeting on May 2, 1921 to administer to her the oath of office.

Among Ousley's promises as mayor was a vow to clean up both the city and city hall, which she did – literally. In the building she discarded cuspidors, painted it inside and out, and divided the interior into an office for herself, a space for councilmen, and a jail. Outside she cleaned the streets and sidewalks, and forced landlords to install plumbing inside. She proved willing to help the underprivileged; however, she proved less forgiving to drivers, who were warned by a sign at the edge of town, "Drive slow and see our beautiful city, drive fast and see our jail.” She promoted a bond issue to finance a new power plant for the town; she pushed for a city water system, and worked to attract business to St. James as well.

Upon winning office Ousley became an in-demand speaker, and addressed organizations around the state. She was elected, in 1922, secretary-treasurer of the Ozark Trail Association of Missouri. Also in 1922 she appeared before the state highway commission, asking for funding for a highway between St. Louis and Springfield.

Ousley was unable to parlay her success as mayor into a higher position; she ran for the Missouri House of Representatives in 1924, and for Missouri State Senate in the twenty-fourth district in 1926, but as a Republican in a heavily Democratic county could not overcome her party's unpopularity. After this she confined herself to running for her former office. In 1927, she was defeated. In 1930, she was drafted at the last minute without her consent or knowledge, and lost by only two votes, though she had not had time to campaign. In 1939 she ran again, unopposed, and won; she won reelection in 1941 with a margin of close to four hundred votes. Defeats followed in 1943 and 1955, but she won once more in 1955.

Ousley and her husband were active in the local Masonic and Odd Fellows lodges. She served in many other civic roles during her career, including as a trustee of the State Board of Training Schools and Odd Fellows Retirement home in Liberty, Missouri; as president of the State Assembly of Rebekah Lodge; an officer of the Phelps County Historical Society, the National Good Roads Association, and the Order of Eastern Star; and a member of the Trinity Episcopal Church. With her husband she was a member of the local chamber of commerce and the St. James Charity Board.

Her husband died in 1958 at the age of 75. Ousley died in 1970 at the age of 83, and is buried at Saint James Cemetery in St. James, Missouri along with her husband. A portrait hangs in the city hall of the town, which was named for her in 2013.

Ousley's papers today are held by the State Historical Society of Missouri.
