= Rolla Ranger Station Historic District =

Historic district in Missouri, United States

- U.S. National Register of Historic Places
- U.S. Historic district
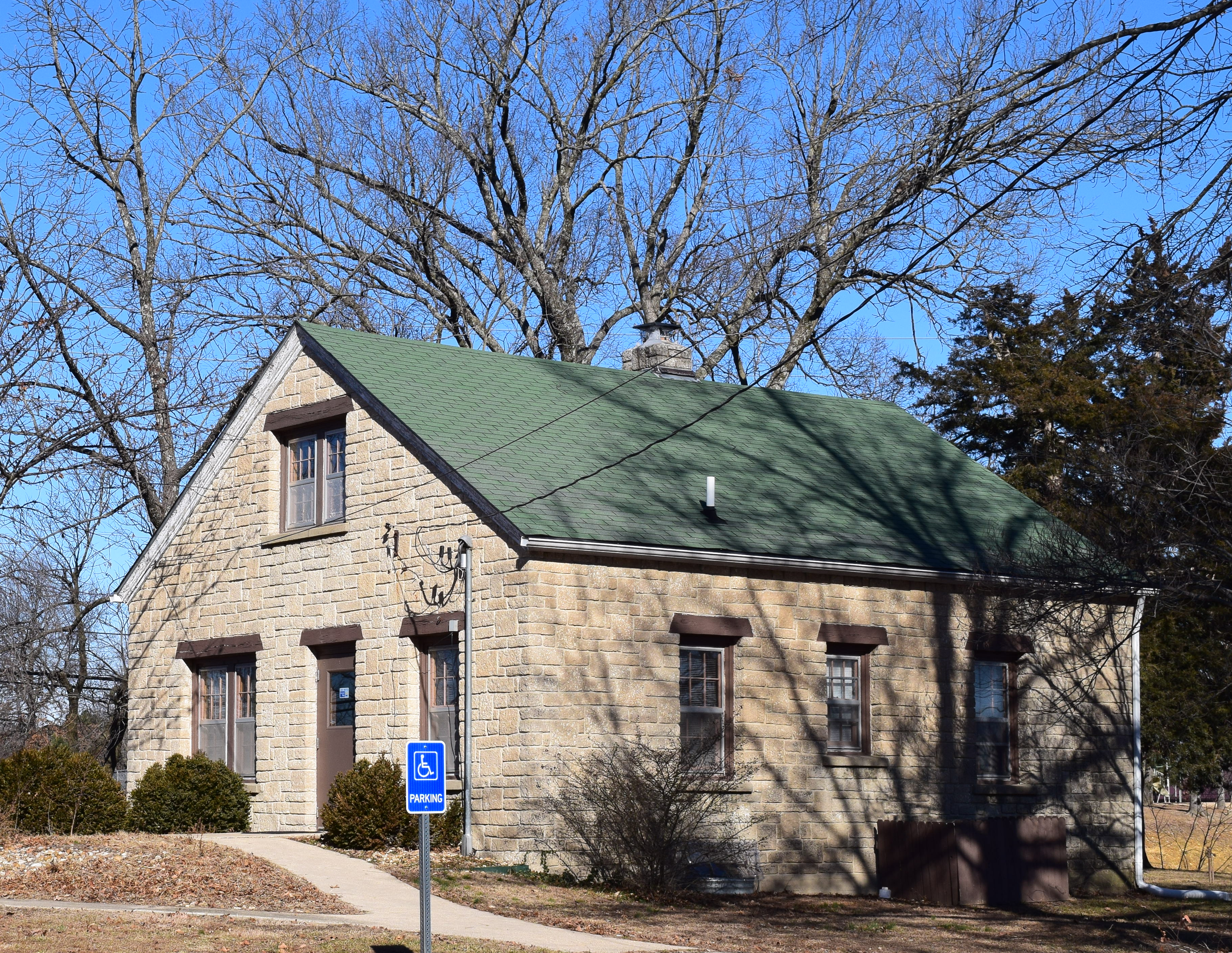
- Ranger's office

- Location within Missouri Location within the United States
- Location: Bridge School Road and Kingshighway, Rolla, Missouri
- Coordinates: 37°56′37″N 91°47′23″W
- Area: 10 acres (4.0 ha)
- Built: 1937-1938
- Architect: Civilian Conservation Corps
- Architectural style: Colonial Revival
- MPS: Mark Twain National Forest MPS
- NRHP reference No.: 03000717
- Added to NRHP: August 4, 2003

The Rolla Ranger Station Historic District is a historic ranger station and national historic district located at Mark Twain National Forest near Rolla, Phelps County, Missouri. The station includes five frame and limestone buildings constructed by the Civilian Conservation Corps (CCC) during 1937 and 1938. They were built under the supervision of a Works Progress Administration (WPA) project. They are a ranger's office, dwelling, garage, warehouse and oil house. The ranger's office and dwelling are 1 1/2-story, Colonial Revival influenced buildings.

It was listed on the National Register of Historic Places in 2003.
