= National Bank of Rolla Building =

Historic building in Rolla, Missouri, US

- Phelps County Bank
- U.S. National Register of Historic Places
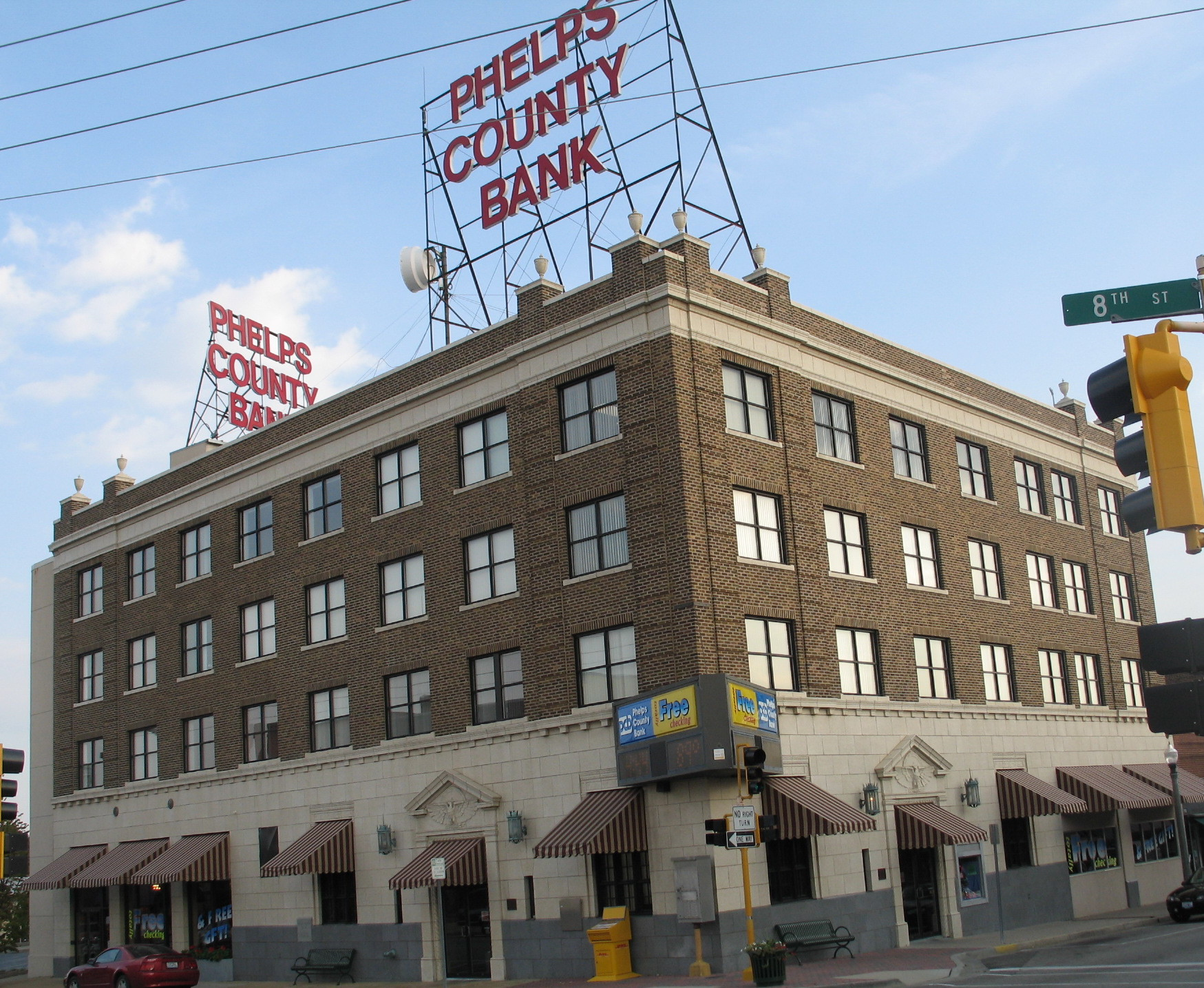

- Location within Missouri Location within the United States
- Location: Rolla, Missouri
- Coordinates: 37°56′59″N 91°46′16″W
- Area: less than one acre
- Built: 1931
- Architect: Johnson and Maack; Gillioz, M.E.
- Architectural style: Colonial Revival
- NRHP reference No.: 01001380
- Added to NRHP: December 28, 2001

The National Bank of Rolla Building was opened in March 1931 at 8th and Pine Streets in Rolla, Missouri, midway between St. Louis and Springfield. Because of its architectural character and its importance in the life of the city and history of U.S. Route 66, the building was added to the National Register of Historic Places in 2001.

== History ==
The National Bank of Rolla (1870s–1933) occupied the northwest corner of the first floor and the Edwin Long Hotel (1931–1970s) had the remainder of the building. The basement level served as the College Inn banquet hall, with a capacity of 350. The hotel had 75 guest rooms and the Edwin Long Coffee Shop for daily dining. The hotel was located adjacent to the historic U.S. Route 66, which ran directly through Rolla on 8th Street.

Daily room rates were $2.00 for a single bed and $3.00 for a double bed, with each room's having a tub shower and radiant heat. The Edwin Long Hotel operated from 1931 until the early 1970s, when the building was purchased by the Phelps County Bank for the headquarters of its banking operation. The hotel's business slowly declined after U.S. Route 66 (now I-44) was rerouted in the late 1950s from downtown to the northern outskirts of Rolla.

The First National Bank of Rolla was liquidated in 1933 during the Great Depression. Rolla State Bank, which took over the bank space, occupied the northwest corner of the first floor of the building until 1963. Phelps County Bank then took over the entire building. It has continued to operate in the same location.

Phelps County Bank restored the building's exterior in 2001. It occupies the entire building, using the first floor for the bank service lobby, the second floor for the loan department, third floor for bookkeeping, and fourth floor for executive offices. The bank uses the former banquet hall on the lower level for a large board room and meeting room for bank functions. The First National Bank building has served as a centerpiece for downtown commerce in Rolla since the 1930s. With Phelps County Bank, the building is still a source of regional financial services.

Over the years, many famous people stayed at the Edwin Long Hotel, including President Harry Truman, actress Marilyn Monroe, and actor Victor Mature. The hotel served as the premier facility for travelers using Route 66 or the Frisco Railroad from the 1930s through the early 1960s, when passenger railroad service stopped. Motels built on the rerouted Route 66 (I-44) during the 1950s and 1960s drew away travelers from downtown.

== Sources ==
- Bradbury, John F. Rolla. The Old Town. 2002.
- Clair V Mann Collection. University of MO-Rolla Archives.
- Edwin Long, The New Hotel. 1931.
- Rolla Daily News, 20 May 2001.
- "Rolla, Missouri, the Convention City of the Ozarks". Rolla Chamber of Commerce, 1931.
- The Rolla New Era, 13 Mar. 1931.
- The Rolla New Era, 14 Nov. 1930.
- The Rolla New Era, 17 Mar. 1931.
- The Rolla New Era, 19 Dec. 1930.
- The Rolla New Era, 24 Oct. 1930.
- The Rolla New Era, 26 Sept. 1930.
- St. Louis Globe Democrat Magazine, 12 Oct. 1952.
- "The Early Years of Route 66." The Phelps County Historical Society Oct. 1993.
- "Total Customer Service - Phelps County Bank." Inc: the Magazine for Growing Companies, Jan. 1994.
