= Fort Wyman =

Former fort in Missouri, U.S.

Coordinates: 37.936881°N 91.775858°W

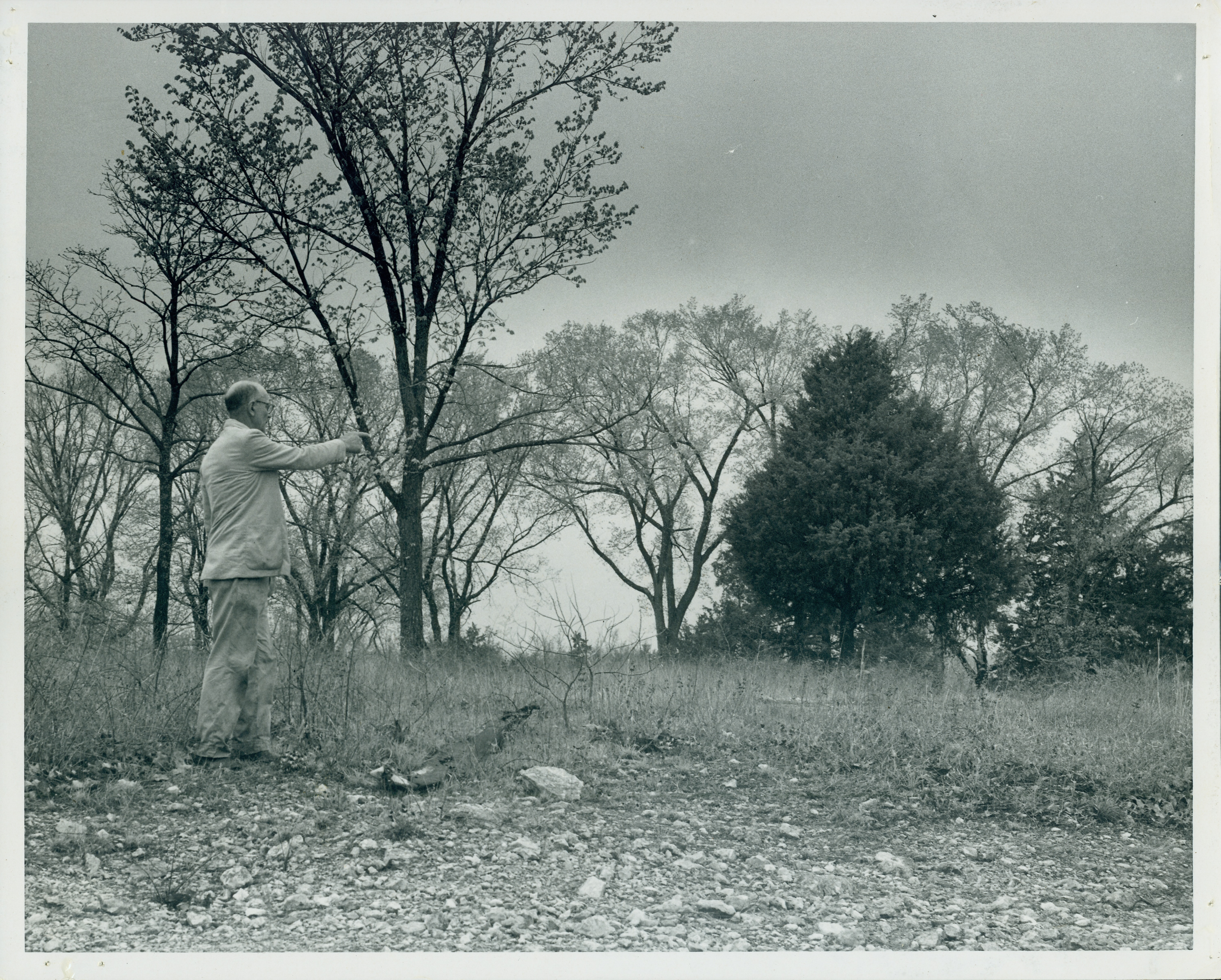
Site of Fort Wyman in Rolla, Missouri, 1958.

Fort Wyman was an earthen fort built by the Union Army near Rolla, Missouri during the American Civil War.

Rolla had been captured by General Franz Sigel on June 12, 1861 and from that date throughout the Civil War it remained in Union hands for President Abraham Lincoln had issued an order: "By all means hold Rolla." Rolla was the westernmost supply depot in Southern Missouri being at the Western Terminus of the Pacific Railroad at that date. Following the Union defeat at the Battle of Wilson's Creek on August 10, 1861, the Union Army fell back to Rolla and began building an earthen fort on the top of a hill alongside the present Highway 63 about a mile from the Courthouse. The rectangular fort had a dry moat around the perimeter with 32-pound field pieces located on each corner of the fort to cover any attack on Rolla from the south. It was named Fort Wyman after Colonel John B. Wyman. Colonel Wyman sent out soldiers from Rolla in all directions who captured what they called rebellious residents of the Rolla area and made them prisoners and forced them to clear the Fort Wyman area of the brush and trees by using the ax, shovel, pick, and saw. Four huge guns arrived by railroad to be placed at the four corners of the Fort. The guns were called "32-pounders". Each gun required a ten-mule team to drag the gun from the railroad depot to the fort that was done on August 18, 1861. These guns were fired only for practice. The fort was a Union stronghold in the Midwest. While it never saw military action, it trained and provided Union troops that kept Missouri in Union hands.
