= Fort Dette =

Missouri Civil War fort

Coordinates: 37.953635°N 91.772826°W

Fort Dette, or as it was sometimes known, Star Fort, was a double-deck fortification built in a Greek Cross or "+" configuration in Rolla, Missouri. A blockhouse built in East Rolla, it was named Fort Dette, after Captain John F. W. Dette, an officer who supervised most of its construction. It was arranged for emplacement of artillery on the ends of both decks, it had a light field piece on the bottom deck, and a larger caliber gun, probably a 32- or 24- pounder, on the deck above. The upper deck was supported by upright log and timber walls below, which were pierced at regular intervals with loopholes for riflemen. The structure was one hundred and forty feet long across each arm, and was surrounded by a moat or ditch eight feet wide and four feet deep. A twenty-foot square powder magazine was safely buried below the bottom gun deck, and the works were crowned with a small guard house and observation platform in the middle of the upper deck.

Fort Dette was placed to protect the eastern approach to Rolla. It was located on what is now the campus of Missouri University of Science and Technology (formerly the University of Missouri at Rolla). It is no longer in existence.
