= Rolla, Missouri =

City in Missouri, U.S.

- City
- City of Rolla
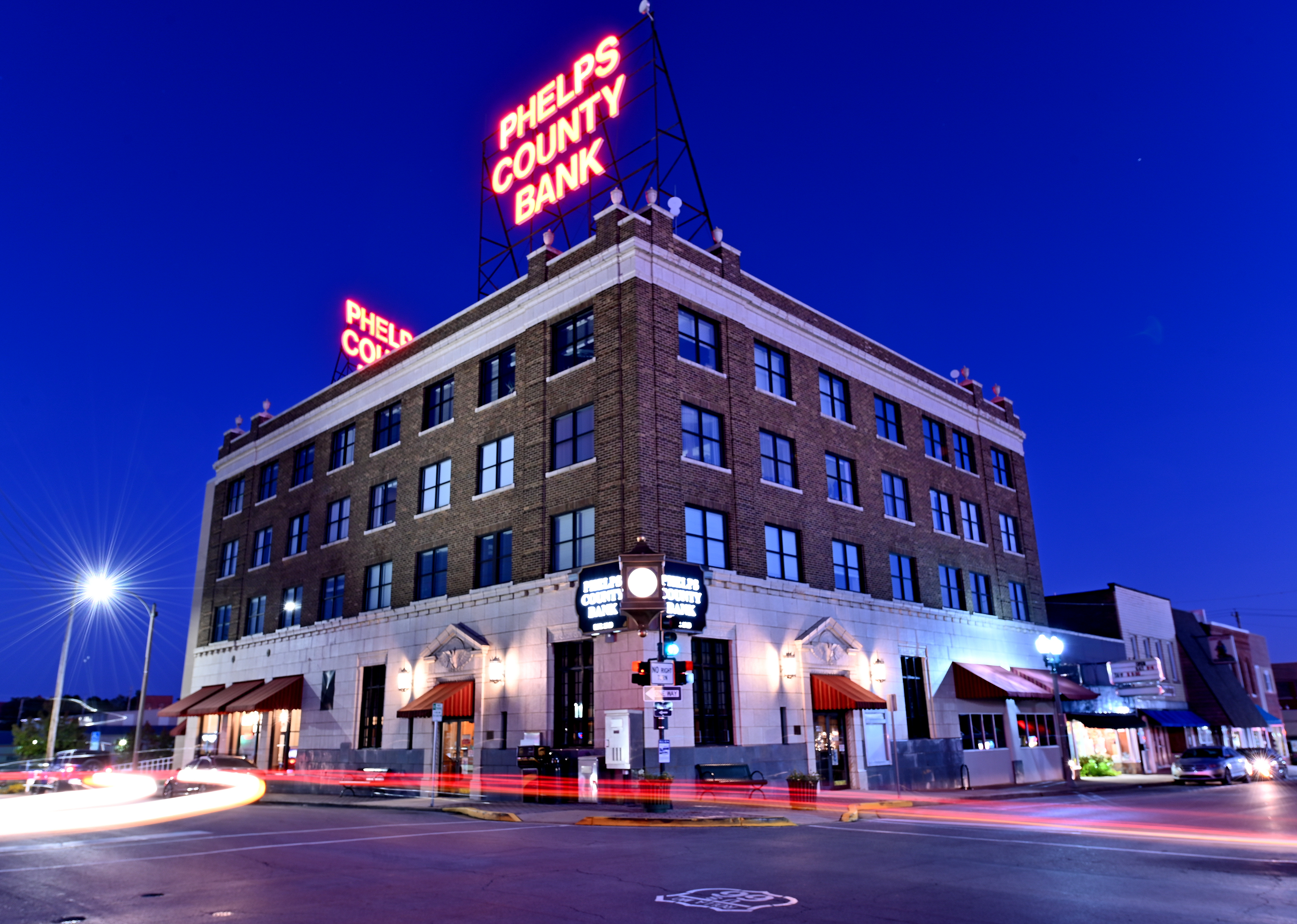
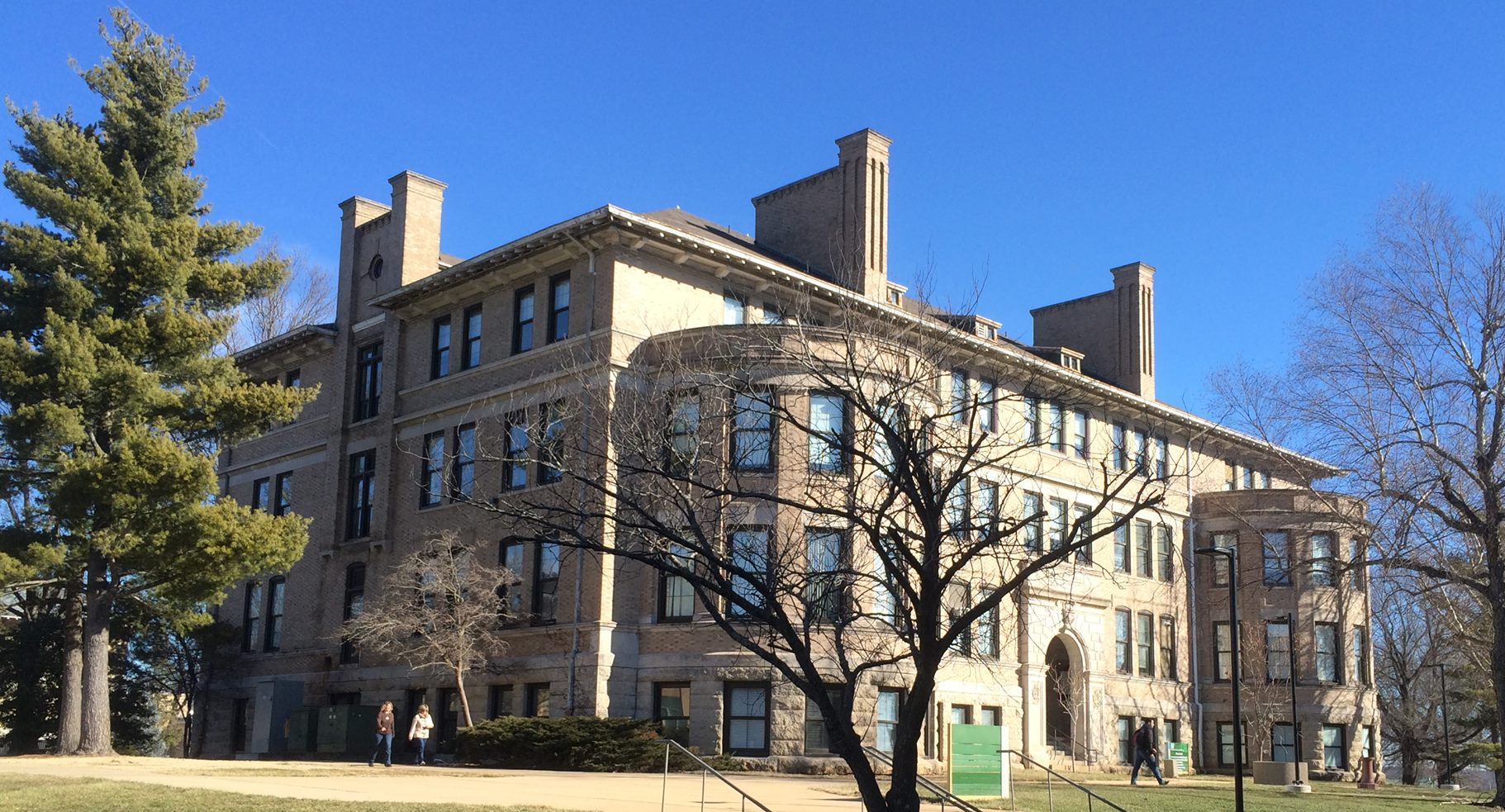
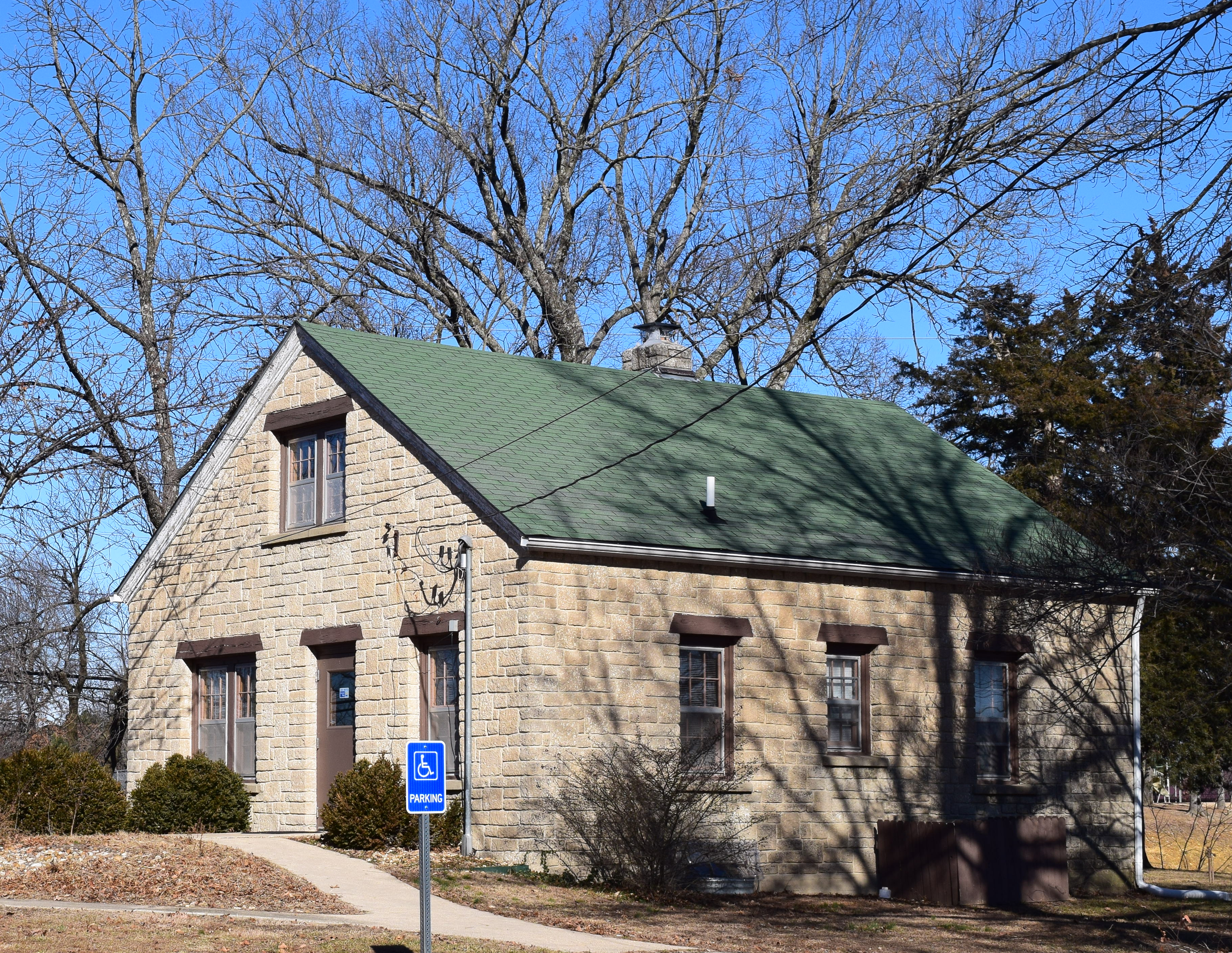
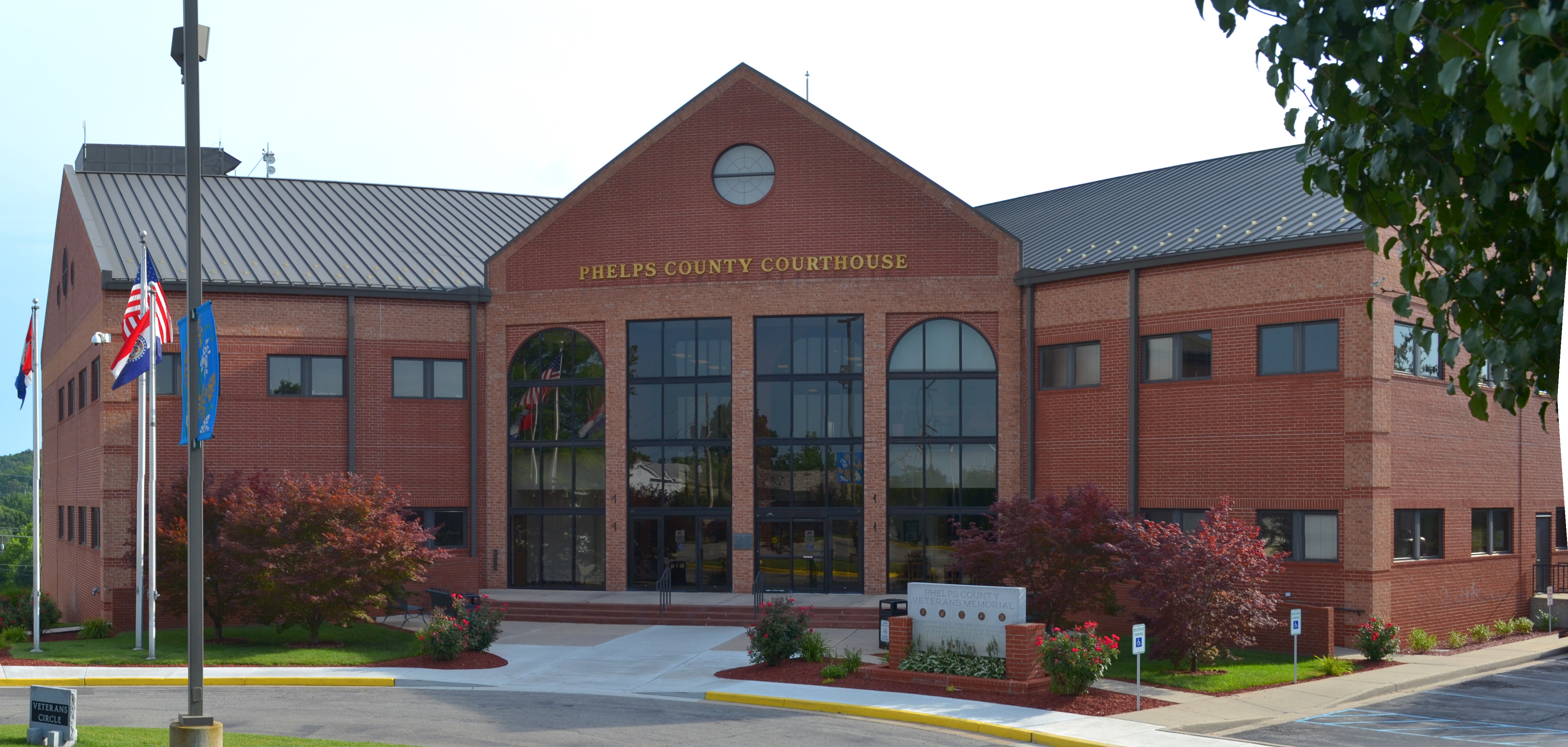
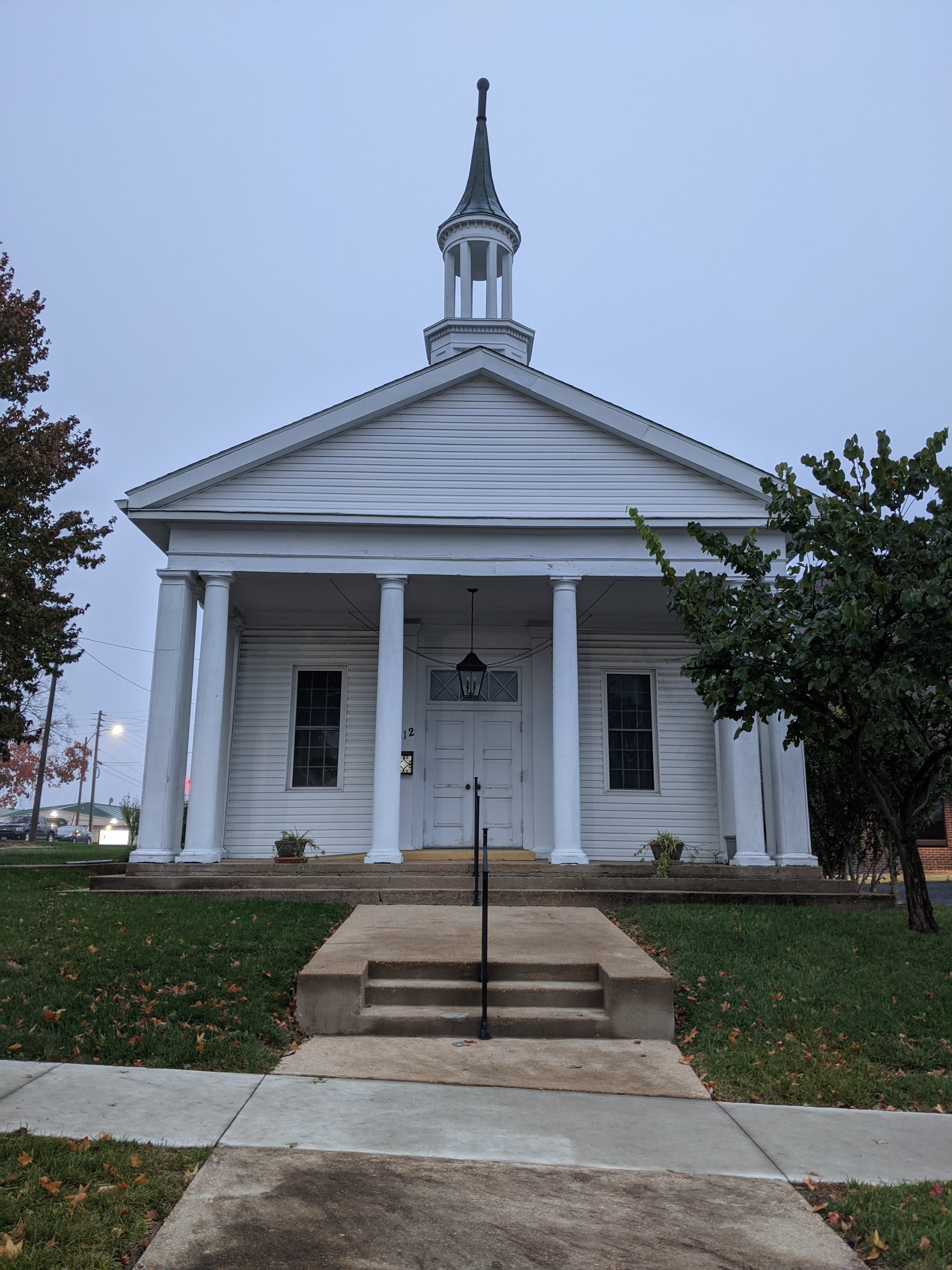
- National Bank of Rolla Building Missouri University of Science and Technology Rolla Ranger Station Phelps County Courthouse Hope Lutheran Church

- Flag
- Nickname: The Middle of Everywhere
- Interactive map of Rolla, Missouri
- Location within Missouri Location within the United States
- Coordinates: 37°56′45″N 91°45′39″W
- Country: United States
- State: Missouri
- County: Phelps
- Founded: 1858
- Incorporated: January 25, 1861

Area
  - Total: 12.15 sq mi (31.47 km^{2})
  - Land: 12.13 sq mi (31.41 km^{2})
  - Water: 0.019 sq mi (0.05 km^{2})
- Elevation: 1,099 ft (335 m)

Population (2020)
  - Total: 19,943
  - Estimate (2026): 21,029
  - Density: 1,644.3/sq mi (634.86/km^{2})
- Demonym: Rollan
- Time zone: UTC-6 (Central (CST))
  - Summer (DST): UTC-5 (CDT)
- ZIP codes: 65401, 65402, 65409
- Area code: 573
- FIPS code: 29-62912
- GNIS feature ID: 2396418
- Website: rollacity.org

Rolla (/ˈrɒlə/ ROL-ə) is a city in and the county seat of Phelps County, Missouri, United States. Its population in the 2020 United States Census was 19,943. It is approximately midway between St. Louis and Springfield along I-44. Its micropolitan statistical area consists of all of Phelps County. Nearby is an inactive township (Rolla Township). The city is a Midwestern college town in the Ozark Mountains that is home to the Missouri University of Science and Technology, well known for its many engineering departments and computer science department. The headquarters of the Mark Twain National Forest is in Rolla. The city is also within the Ozark Highlands American Viticultural Area, with vineyards first established by Italian immigrants to the area.

== History ==
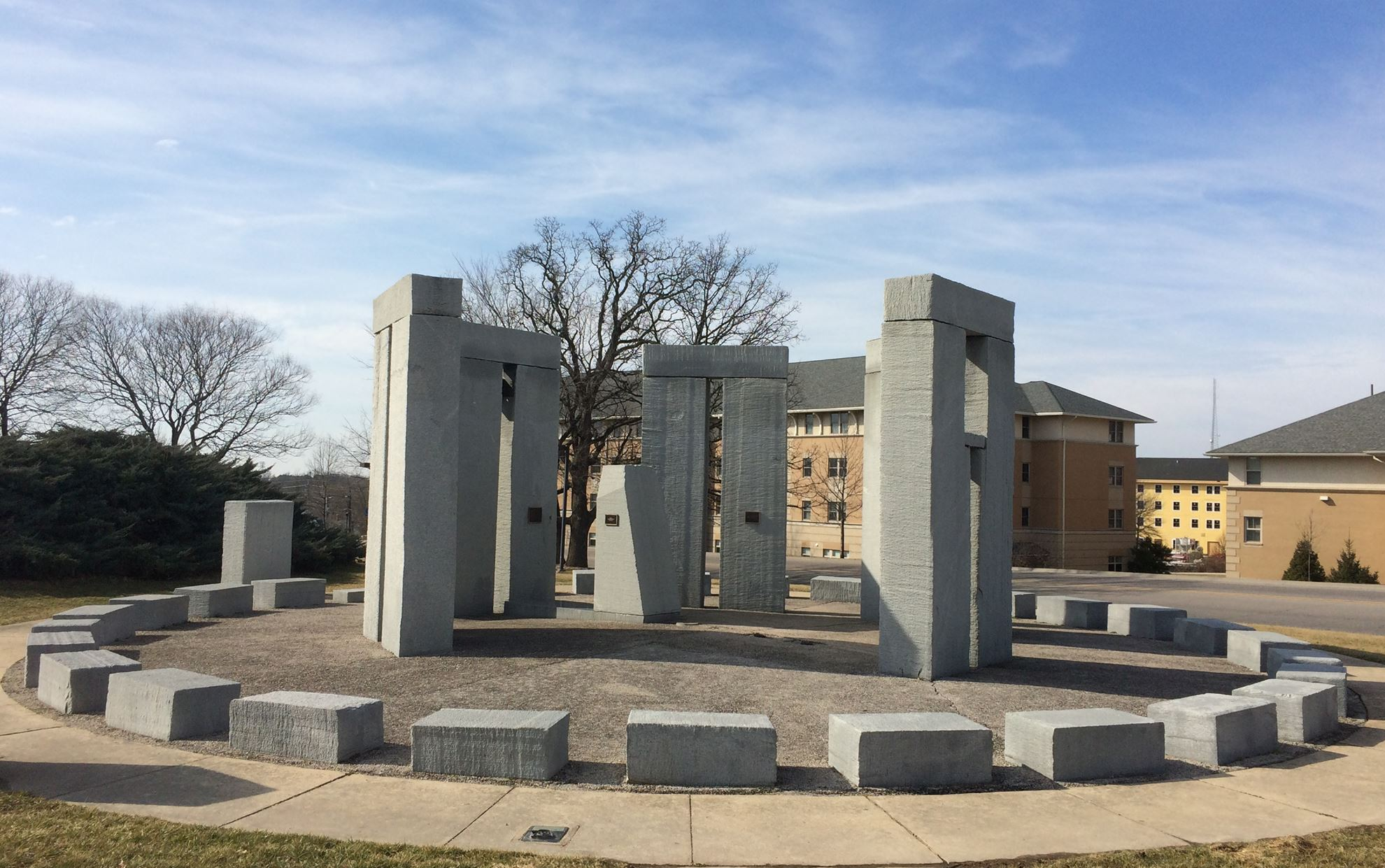
Stonehenge Replica at Missouri S&T

The first European-American settlers in Phelps County arrived in the early 19th century, working as farmers and iron workers along the local rivers, such as the Meramec, the Gasconade, and the Little Piney. In 1842, John Webber built the first house in what became the City of Rolla. Nine years later, railroad contractor Edmund Ward Bishop, considered to be the founder of Rolla, settled in the area. The state officially established Rolla as a town in 1858.

Three stories account for how Rolla was named. One story, widely regarded as a folk legend, and acknowledged as such by the Phelps County Historical Society, arises from the competition between Rolla and neighboring Dillon, Missouri, to be designated the county seat. When Rolla was made the county seat in 1861, the residents of Dillon, having lost a round, were allowed to choose the name of the new city and named it Rolla, after a good-for-nothing hunting dog.

Another story came from a citizens' meeting about naming the town. Webber was said to prefer the name Hardscrabble (which was used to describe the soils in the region) and Bishop pushed for the name Phelps Center. George Coppedge, representing new settlers from North Carolina, wanted to name the community after Raleigh. Bishop broke the three-way tie by agreeing with Coppedge as long as the name was spelled properly for the region, Rolla.

But the one story that has some first hand evidence to back it up was that it was named after Rolla Rose of St. Louis. He and others traveled to the area in the 1840s on a hunting trip. He carved his name on a tree so that they would not get lost. His widow, Adeline Rose, related this story in the St. Louis Globe newspaper on July 19, 1903.

With numerous settlers from the South, many residents of Rolla leaned toward the Confederacy during the American Civil War; however, the town was taken by Union forces in June 1861. They built two minor forts—Fort Wyman and Fort Dette—during their occupation. Rolla was also the location of Camp Glover and Camp Davies. From 1863 to 1865, Rolla was the regimental headquarters of the 5th Missouri State Militia.

For most of its history, Rolla has served as a transportation and trading center. In 1860, it became the western terminus of the first-constructed leg of the St. Louis–San Francisco Railway, colloquially known as the "Frisco Line". Today, the BNSF Railway directly runs through the town.

Rolla was also a regular stop along U.S. Route 66, as it is almost located exactly halfway between the larger cities of St. Louis and Springfield. Today, Interstate 44, U.S. Route 63, and Route 72 all run through Rolla.

== Geography ==
According to the United States Census Bureau, the city has a total area of 11.85 square miles (30.69 km^{2}), of which 11.83 square miles (30.64 km^{2}) is land and 0.02 square miles (0.05 km^{2}) is water. Running through the city is the divide line that separates the vast Missouri watershed (via the Little Piney and the Gasconade) from the substantially smaller Meremec watershed (via the Bourbeuse).

=== Climate ===
Rolla has a humid subtropical climate. The Köppen Climate Classification subtype for this climate is "Cfa".

Climate data for Rolla, Missouri (Missouri University of Science and Technology), 1991–2020 normals, extremes 1896–present
Month	Jan	Feb	Mar	Apr	May	Jun	Jul	Aug	Sep	Oct	Nov	Dec	Year
Record high °F (°C)	78 (26)	84 (29)	92 (33)	93 (34)	99 (37)	105 (41)	113 (45)	108 (42)	105 (41)	94 (34)	85 (29)	79 (26)	113 (45)
Mean maximum °F (°C)	66.1 (18.9)	70.7 (21.5)	78.5 (25.8)	85.0 (29.4)	88.9 (31.6)	93.1 (33.9)	97.9 (36.6)	98.0 (36.7)	92.6 (33.7)	85.4 (29.7)	75.6 (24.2)	66.9 (19.4)	99.7 (37.6)
Mean daily maximum °F (°C)	40.9 (4.9)	46.1 (7.8)	56.0 (13.3)	67.2 (19.6)	75.9 (24.4)	84.1 (28.9)	88.9 (31.6)	88.1 (31.2)	80.4 (26.9)	69.1 (20.6)	55.7 (13.2)	44.8 (7.1)	66.4 (19.1)
Daily mean °F (°C)	31.7 (−0.2)	36.1 (2.3)	45.4 (7.4)	56.3 (13.5)	65.8 (18.8)	74.3 (23.5)	78.8 (26.0)	77.6 (25.3)	69.6 (20.9)	58.2 (14.6)	46.0 (7.8)	36.0 (2.2)	56.3 (13.5)
Mean daily minimum °F (°C)	22.4 (−5.3)	26.2 (−3.2)	34.8 (1.6)	45.4 (7.4)	55.7 (13.2)	64.6 (18.1)	68.7 (20.4)	67.1 (19.5)	58.9 (14.9)	47.3 (8.5)	36.4 (2.4)	27.2 (−2.7)	46.2 (7.9)
Mean minimum °F (°C)	2.9 (−16.2)	7.6 (−13.6)	17.0 (−8.3)	30.8 (−0.7)	40.6 (4.8)	53.6 (12.0)	59.8 (15.4)	58.4 (14.7)	44.6 (7.0)	31.9 (−0.1)	19.9 (−6.7)	8.8 (−12.9)	−0.7 (−18.2)
Record low °F (°C)	−24 (−31)	−22 (−30)	−3 (−19)	13 (−11)	31 (−1)	40 (4)	49 (9)	42 (6)	32 (0)	19 (−7)	3 (−16)	−19 (−28)	−24 (−31)
Average precipitation inches (mm)	2.73 (69)	2.49 (63)	4.14 (105)	4.90 (124)	5.48 (139)	4.37 (111)	4.74 (120)	4.52 (115)	4.00 (102)	3.26 (83)	3.92 (100)	2.83 (72)	47.38 (1,203)
Average snowfall inches (cm)	5.6 (14)	4.1 (10)	2.6 (6.6)	0.2 (0.51)	0.0 (0.0)	0.0 (0.0)	0.0 (0.0)	0.0 (0.0)	0.0 (0.0)	0.1 (0.25)	1.3 (3.3)	3.4 (8.6)	17.3 (44)
Average precipitation days (≥ 0.01 in)	9.4	9.1	12.1	11.8	13.0	10.3	9.4	9.1	8.3	8.8	9.5	9.2	120.0
Average snowy days (≥ 0.1 in)	4.9	4.7	2.7	0.5	0.0	0.0	0.0	0.0	0.0	0.1	1.1	3.8	17.8
Source: NOAA

== Demographics ==
Historical population
Census	Pop.	Note	%±
1870	1,354		—
1880	1,582		16.8%
1890	1,592		0.6%
1900	1,600		0.5%
1910	2,261		41.3%
1920	2,077		−8.1%
1930	3,670		76.7%
1940	5,141		40.1%
1950	9,354		81.9%
1960	11,132		19.0%
1970	13,571		21.9%
1980	13,303		−2.0%
1990	14,090		5.9%
2000	16,367		16.2%
2010	19,559		19.5%
2020	19,943		2.0%
2026 (est.)	21,029		5.4%
U.S. Decennial Census

=== 2020 census ===
As of the 2020 census, Rolla had a population of 19,943. The population density was 1,644.1 per square mile (634.9/km^{2}). There were 8,117 households and 4,141 families residing in the city.

The median age was 27.9 years. 17.1% were under the age of 18, 29.7% were between 18 and 24, 23.8% were from 25 to 44, 16.4% were from 45 to 64, and 13.2% were 65 years of age or older. For every 100 females there were 120.6 males, and for every 100 females age 18 and over there were 124.6 males age 18 and over.

99.2% of residents lived in urban areas, while 0.8% lived in rural areas.

Of the 8,117 households, 22.4% had children under the age of 18 living in them. Of all households, 29.9% were married-couple households, 31.8% were households with a male householder and no spouse or partner present, and 31.2% were households with a female householder and no spouse or partner present; 40.7% were made up of individuals, and 12.2% had someone living alone who was 65 years of age or older. The average household size was 2.1 and the average family size was 2.7.

There were 9,258 housing units, of which 12.3% were vacant. The homeowner vacancy rate was 2.6% and the rental vacancy rate was 10.2%.

Racial composition as of the 2020 census
Race	Number	Percent
White	16,064	80.5%
Black or African American	839	4.2%
American Indian and Alaska Native	101	0.5%
Asian	1,248	6.3%
Native Hawaiian and Other Pacific Islander	9	0.0%
Other ethnicity	291	1.5%
Two or more races	1,391	7.0%
Hispanic or Latino (of any race)	687	3.4%

=== 2016–2020 American Community Survey ===
The 2016–2020 5-year American Community Survey estimates show that the median household income was $37,252 (with a margin of error of +/- $5,474) and the median family income was $55,595 (+/- $4,340). Males had a median income of $17,959 (+/- $5,438) versus $23,582 (+/- $1,673) for females. The median income for those above 16 years old was $21,873 (+/- $2,358). Approximately, 12.0% of families and 27.3% of the population were below the poverty line, including 19.8% of those under the age of 18 and 17.4% of those ages 65 or over.

=== 2010 census ===
As of the census of 2010, there were 19,559 people, 7,574 households, and 3,765 families living in the city. The population density was 1,653.3 inhabitants per square mile (638.3/km^{2}). There were 8,339 housing units at an average density of 704.9 per square mile (272.2/km^{2}). The racial makeup of the city was 86.71% White, 4.11% Black or African American, 0.43% Native American, 5.70% Asian, 0.09% Native Hawaiian or Pacific Islander, 0.41% from other races, and 2.56% from two or more races. Hispanic or Latino of any race were 2.62% of the population.

There were 7,574 households, of which 25.7% had children under the age of 18 living with them, 35.2% were married couples living together, 10.7% had a female householder with no husband present, 3.8% had a male householder with no wife present, and 50.3% were non-families. 36.4% of all households were made up of individuals, and 10.8% had someone living alone who was 65 years of age or older. The average household size was 2.24 and the average family size was 2.90.

The median age in the city was 26.2 years. 18.2% of residents were under the age of 18; 29.4% were between the ages of 18 and 24; 23.7% were from 25 to 44; 17.1% were from 45 to 64; and 11.6% were 65 years of age or older. The gender makeup of the city was 55.0% male and 45.0% female.

=== 2000 census ===
As of the census of 2000, there were 16,367 people, 6,514 households, and 3,543 families living in the city. The population density was 1,448.7 inhabitants per square mile (559.3/km^{2}). There were 7,221 housing units at an average density of 639.2 per square mile (246.8/km^{2}). The racial makeup of the city was 89.2% White, 2.92% African American, 0.46% Native American, 4.6% Asian, 0.12% Pacific Islander, 0.73% from other races, and 1.69% from two or more races. Hispanic or Latino of any race were 1.72% of the population.

There were 6,514 households, out of which 26.2% had children under the age of 18 living with them, 41.0% were married couples living together, 10.6% had a female householder with no husband present, and 45.6% were non-families. 35.9% of all households were made up of individuals, and 11.4% had someone living alone who was 65 years of age or older. The average household size was 2.20 and the average family size was 2.88.

In the city, the population was spread out, with 20.1% under the age of 18, 25.3% from 18 to 24, 25.2% from 25 to 44, 16.4% from 45 to 64, and 13.0% who were 65 years of age or older. The median age was 28 years. For every 100 females, there were 112.1 males. For every 100 females age 18 and over, there were 114.2 males.

The median income for a household in the city was $26,479, and the median income for a family was $38,975. Males had a median income of $31,861 versus $19,625 for females. The per capita income for the city was $15,916. About 13.8% of families and 22.0% of the population were below the poverty line, including 22.3% of those under age 18 and 13.8% of those age 65 or over.

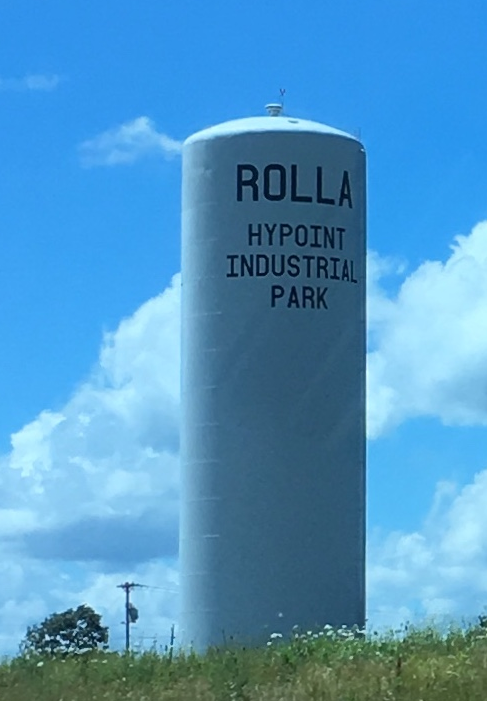
Water tower for Hypoint Industrial Park, along I-44.

== Economy ==
Royal Canin, a major manufacturer of dog and cat food, operates a dry food plant in Rolla.

Small-engine manufacturer Briggs & Stratton operated a major plant in Rolla from 1996 to 2007.

Brewer Science, a nationwide manufacturer of semiconductor manufacturing materials, is headquartered in Rolla.

Hartmann North America started production at a headquarters site in Rolla in July 2017 after the Denmark-based Brødrene Hartmann decided to open such a site in the US. Hartmann is a leading manufacturer of molded-fiber egg packaging, a manufacturer of fruit packaging in South America, and a manufacturer of machinery for producing food packaging. Hartmann used and later expanded the former Briggs & Stratton plant for their Rolla facility.

== Education ==
Rolla is home of the Rolla Bulldogs at Rolla High School and Rolla Middle School.

Rolla is an important center for state and federal education and research in science and technology. It is the home of the Missouri University of Science and Technology (Missouri S&T), founded as the Missouri School of Mines and Metallurgy in 1870 and known as the University of Missouri–Rolla (UMR) from 1964 through 2007. Missouri S&T is well known for its engineering and computer science departments. In addition, the US Geological Survey operates a large regional facility with various centers: the National Geospatial Technical Operations Center III, the Missouri Water Science Center, the Mid-Continent Geographic Science Center, National Spatial Data Infrastructure Partnership Office Liaisons, and the Rolla Science Information and Library Services office.

Rolla has a lending library, the Rolla Public Library.

== Media ==
Rolla and surrounding communities are served by a weekly newspaper, the Phelps County Focus. KUMR, KRTE-FM, KFLW, KFBD, KTTR, KMOZ, KTTR-FM, KZNN, KXMO, and KKID are the local commercial radio stations. KMST (FM) is the Public Radio station and KMNR FM is the student radio station of the Missouri University of Science and Technology.

== Notable places ==
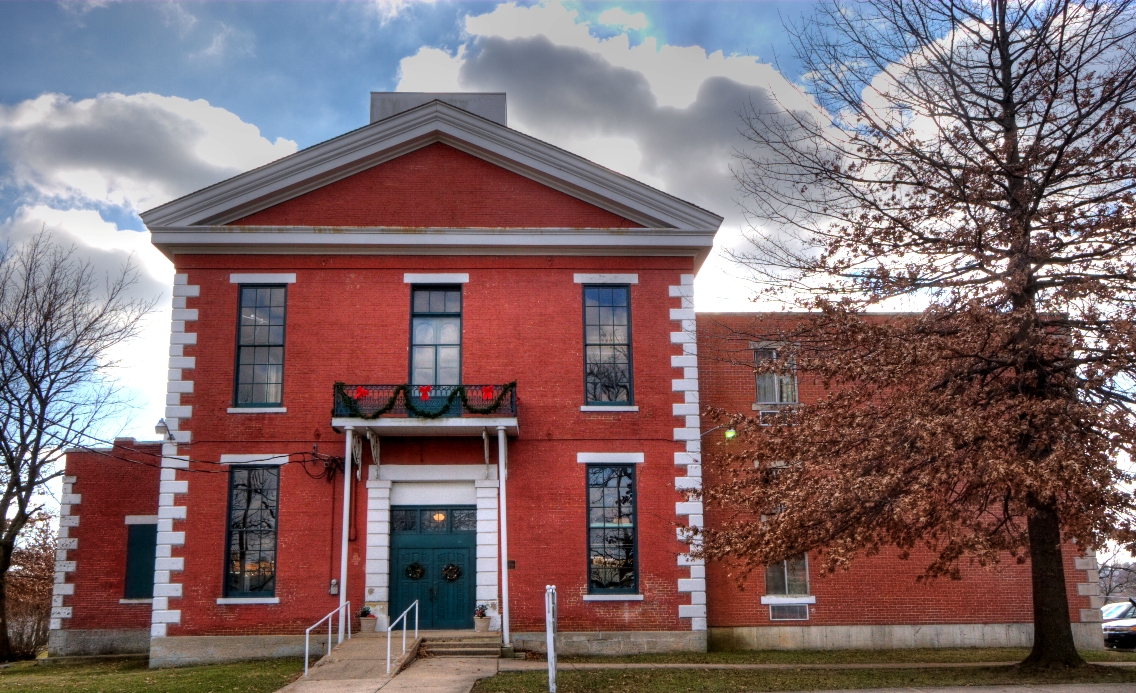
Old Phelps County Courthouse

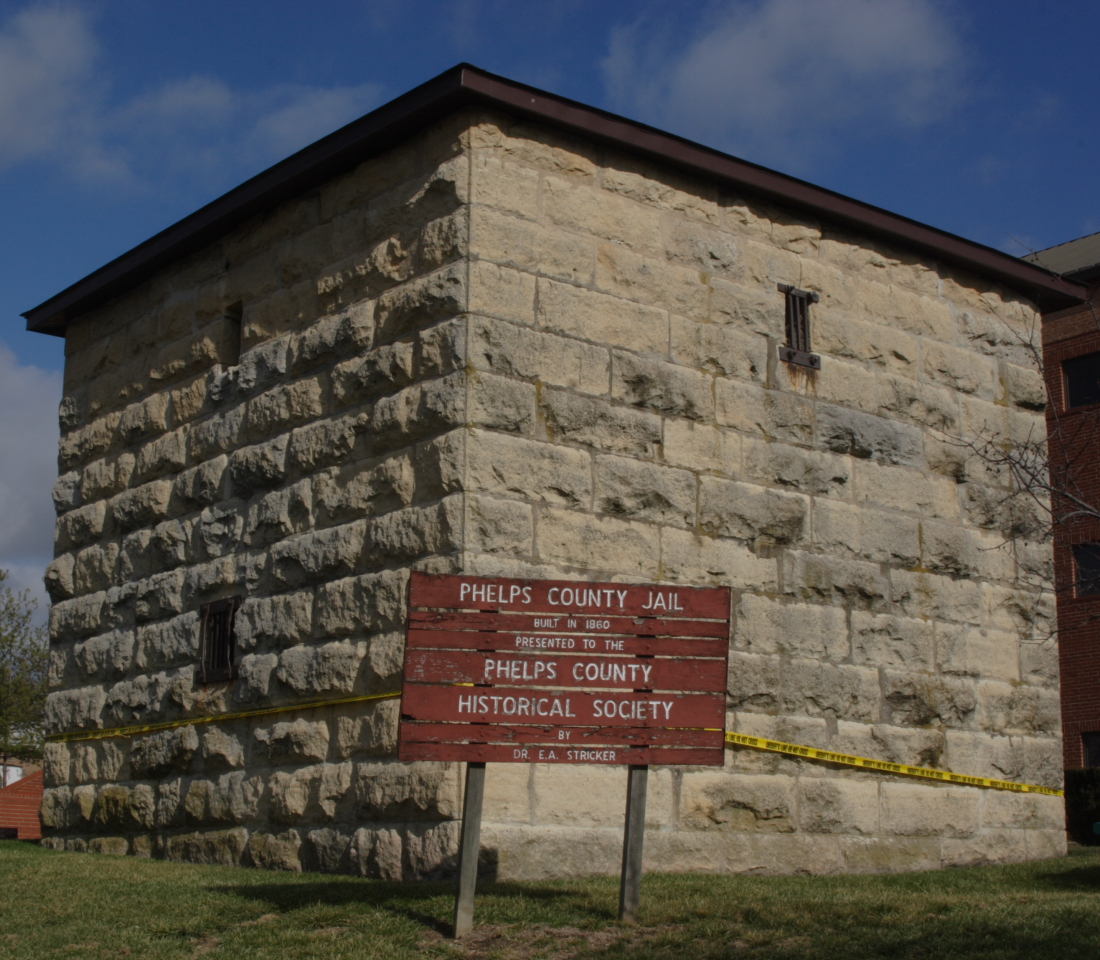
Old Phelps County Jail

- National Bank of Rolla Building, National Register of Historic Places
- Phelps County Courthouse, National Register of Historic Places
- Phelps County Jail, National Register of Historic Places
- Rolla Ranger Station Historic District, National Register of Historic Places
- Headquarters, Rolla Division of the US Bureau of Mines, National Register of Historic Places
- Missouri University of Science and Technology has a half-scale Stonehenge replica built from solid granite located on campus, as well as an astronomical observatory and an operational nuclear reactor, which was the state's first.
- Missouri Department of Natural Resources, Division of Geology and Land Survey and Ed Clark Museum of Missouri Geology.
- United States Geological Survey

== Sister city ==
- Sondershausen, Germany

== Notable people ==
- Jim Boo (born 1954), former professional ice hockey player
- William B. Breuer (1922–2010), American military historian
- Jean Carnahan (1933–2024), former US Senator
- Mel Carnahan (1934–2000), former Governor of Missouri
- Robin Carnahan (born 1961), former Secretary of State of Missouri
- Russ Carnahan (born 1958), former US Representative
- Samuel Ryan Curtis (1805–1866), American Civil War General (Union)
- Charles Gatewood (1942–2016), photographer
- Bill Hardwick (born 1985), Missouri State Representative
- Kyle Hawkins (born 1970), former University of Missouri Men's lacrosse coach
- Elmer Keeton (1882–1947), American musician, black community leader; born in Rolla
- Jeffrey R. Long (born 1969), Professor of chemistry at University of California, Berkeley
- John Lott (born 1959), Professor of mathematics at University of California, Berkeley
- Claire McCaskill (born 1953), former US Senator
- Shannon Miller (born 1977), Olympic gold medalist
- Mayme Ousley (1887–1970), first woman elected mayor of a town in Missouri; born in Edgar Springs and grew up in Rolla
- John A. Rogers (born 1967), physical chemist, material scientist
- Tony Salmons (born 1957), comic book artist
- Chuck Shelton (1935–2020), former American football coach from Missouri
- Tom Shipley (born 1941), member of popular music duo Brewer & Shipley
- Sarah Steelman (born 1958), former State Treasurer of Missouri
- Timothy M. Dolan (born 1950), Cardinal and Archbishop of the Roman Catholic Archdiocese of New York

== See also ==
- List of cities in Missouri
