= Maramec Spring =

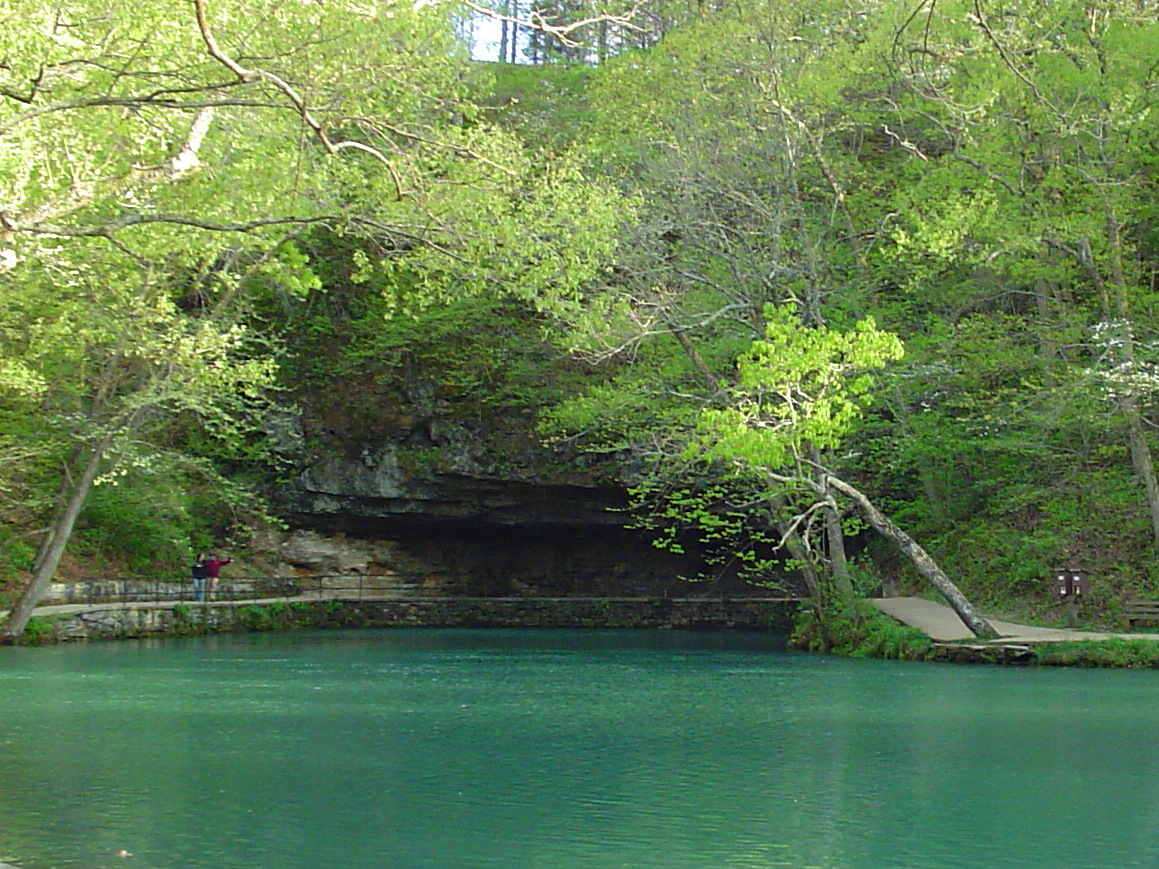
- The spring discharges below an overhanging bluff of Gasconade Dolomite.

Location
- Country: United States
- State: Missouri
- Region: Ozark Plateau
- County: Phelps

Physical characteristics
- Source: Dry Fork watershed
  - location: Salem Plateau, Ozark Plateau, Missouri
  - elevation: 773.97 ft (235.91 m)USGS
- Mouth: Meramec River
  - location: near St. James, Phelps County, Ozark Plateau, Missouri
  - coordinates: 37°57′20″N 91°31′57″W
- Length: 0.87 mi (1.40 km)
- Discharge
  - location: Maramec Spring
  - average: 153 cu ft/s (4.3 m^{3}/s)
  - maximum: 770 cu ft/s (22 m^{3}/s)

Basin features
- U.S. NNL: Designated: 1971
- Maramec Iron Works District
- U.S. National Register of Historic Places
- U.S. Historic district
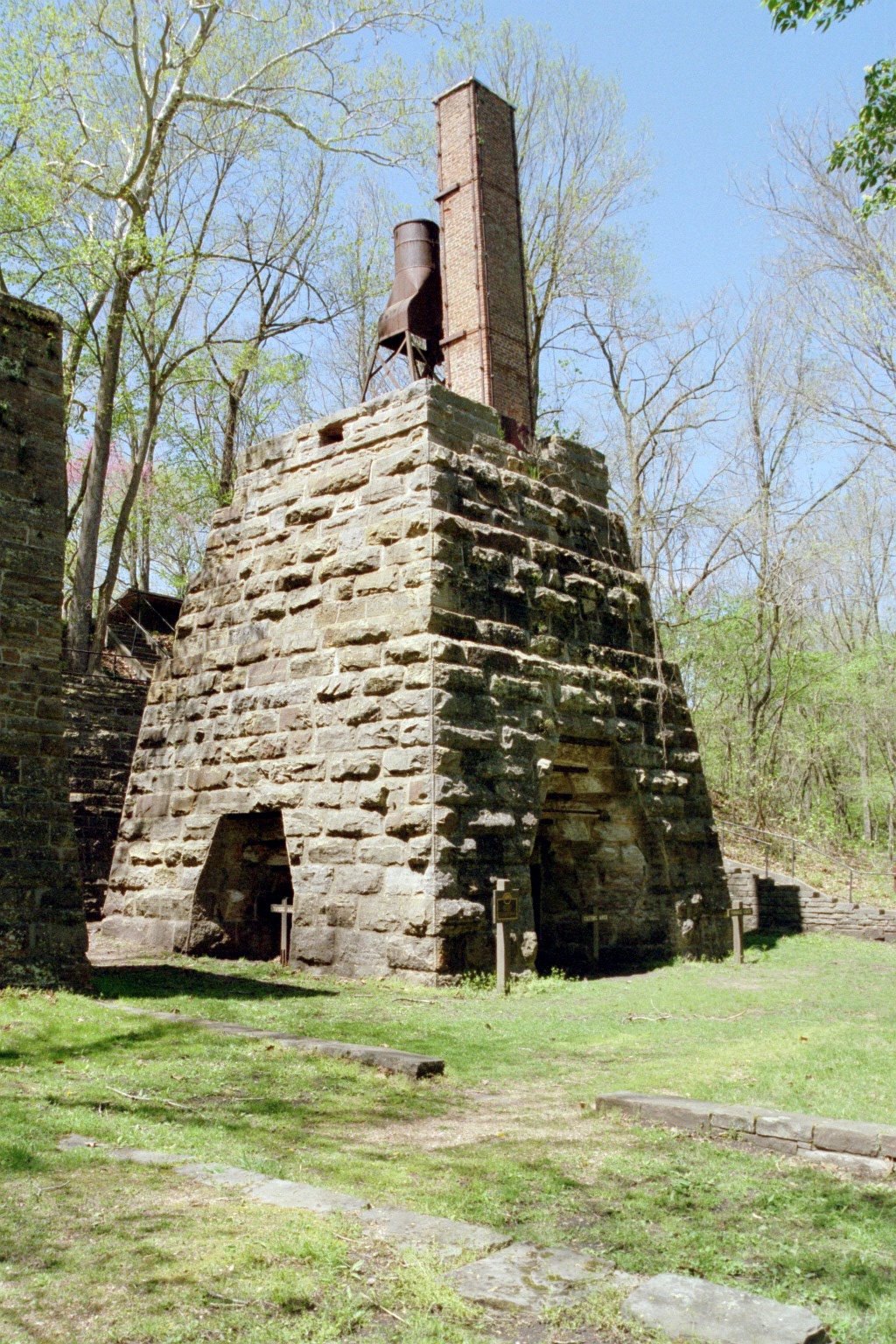
- The remains of an iron furnace of the Maramec Iron Works which used hydropower from the spring
- Nearest city: St. James, Missouri
- Area: 0 acres (0 ha)
- Built: 1826
- NRHP reference No.: 69000122
- Added to NRHP: April 16, 1969

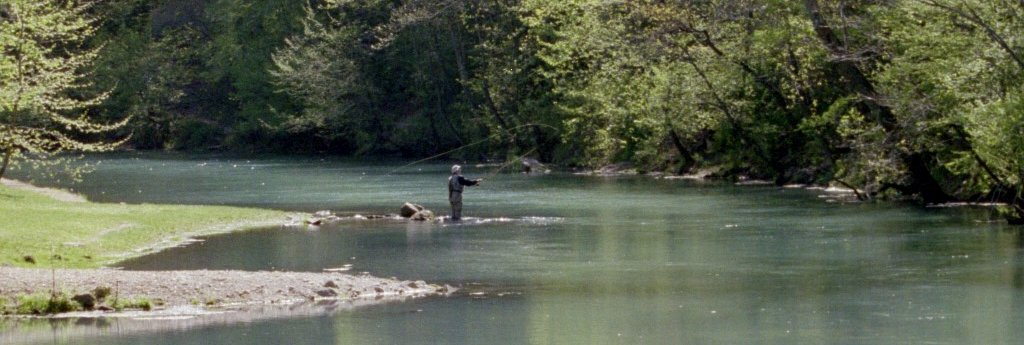
Trout fishing is popular in the branch from Maramec Spring to the river.

Maramec Spring is located on the Meramec River near St. James in the east-central Ozarks of Missouri. The fifth largest spring in the state with an average discharge of 153 cubic feet (4.3 m^{3}) of water per second, it is part of a Karst topographical area, with many springs and caves. The spring and 1800 acres (7.28 km²) are owned by the James Foundation, which maintains the area as a public park, donated by Lucy Wortham James. The Missouri Department of Conservation operates a trout hatchery and fishery at the spring. Ruins of the Maramec Iron Works are still visible at the site; its machinery was partly powered by the spring's waterflow. The spring was declared a National Natural Landmark in October 1971.

== Description ==
The spring's daily discharge averages nearly 100 million gallons (363 million liters). The history of the spring and the iron works is explained in a museum operated by the James Foundation at the site. Another museum in the park features agricultural tools utilized in the area over the years.

The park contains a drive that offers a glimpse into the life in the area while the iron works were operating. It includes a scenic overview of the park, a cemetery which serves as the final resting place of some employees of the iron works, the iron pit mine, and locations of a few homesteads. The park hosts several picnic areas, including pavilions suitable for events.

== Maramec Iron Works ==
Adjacent to the spring are the ruins of the Maramec Iron Works. The first commercially viable iron facility in the US west of the Mississippi, it produced iron from 1826 to 1876. During the US Civil War, it produced iron for cannonballs and James B. Eads' gunships, which were built in St. Louis near the mouth of the river. The iron works used the spring's flow to power its machinery, processing high-grade hematite from a nearby pit. The Maramec Iron Works District was listed on the National Register of Historic Places in 1969.

The James Foundation hosts an annual Old Iron Works Days on a weekend in October. It features arts, crafts, foods, displays and presentations of life in the area during the era of the iron works.

== Recreational activities ==
The park is one of four trout parks in Missouri, providing near year-round fishing. Harvesting season runs from March until October, while the catch and release season runs during the winter months. The stream is restocked every day during fishing season from the 100,000 trout produced annually by the hatchery.

There are 58 campsites in the park, including 30 with electric hook-ups. The park has numerous picnic sites, six reserveable picnic shelters, and multiple playgrounds.

== See also ==
- List of Missouri rivers
- List of Arkansas rivers
- List of Ozark springs
