= St. James, Missouri =

City in Phelps County, Missouri, United States

- City
- City of St. James
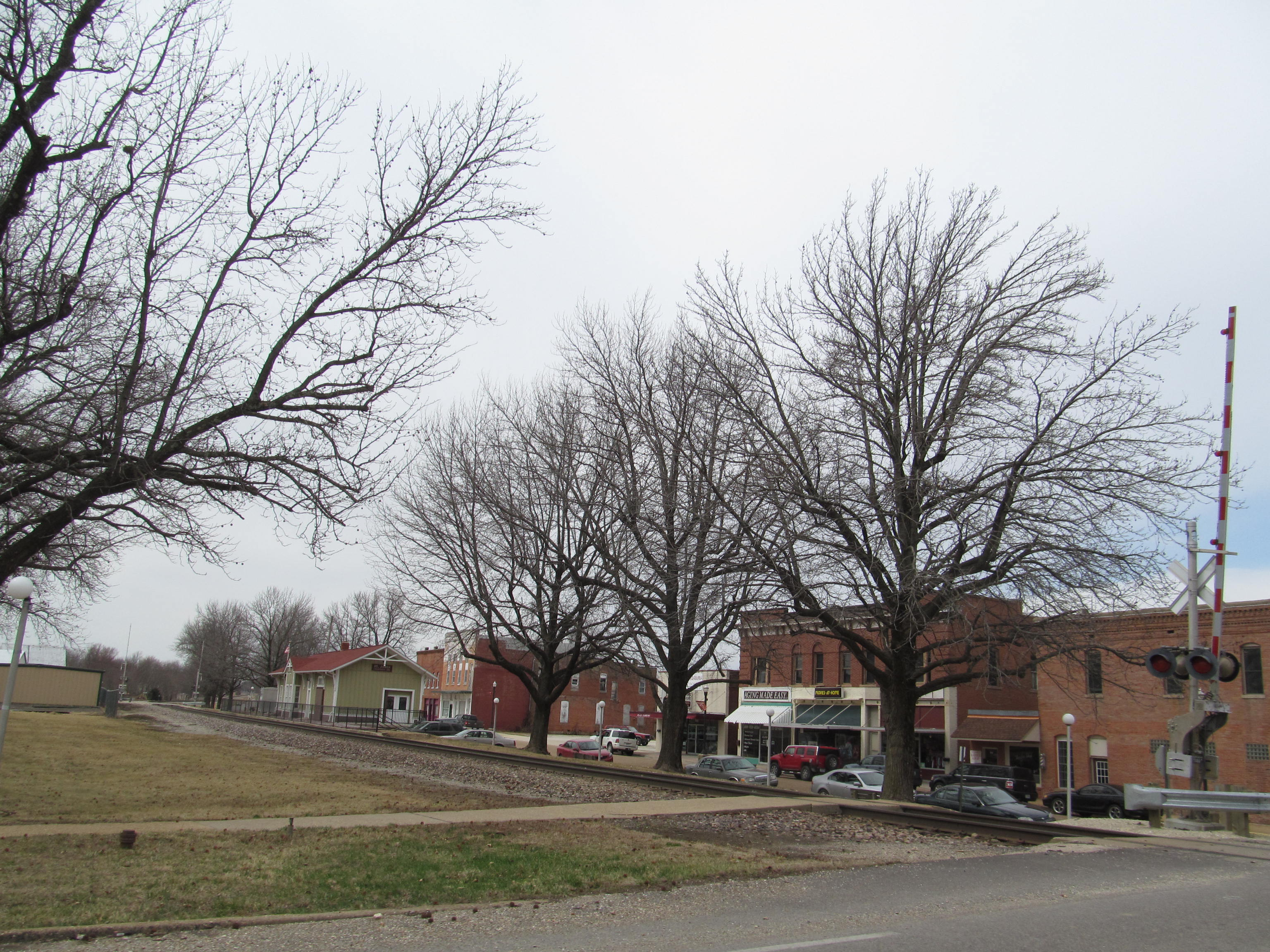
- Business District of St. James in 2014
- Nicknames: STJ, Forest City of The Ozarks
- Location of St. James, Missouri
- Coordinates: 37°59′56″N 91°36′59″W
- Country: United States
- State: Missouri
- County: Phelps

Area
  - Total: 4.28 sq mi (11.09 km^{2})
  - Land: 4.27 sq mi (11.07 km^{2})
  - Water: 0.0077 sq mi (0.02 km^{2})
- Elevation: 1,066 ft (325 m)

Population (2020)
  - Total: 3,935
  - Estimate (2023): 4,053
  - Density: 921.0/sq mi (355.61/km^{2})
- Time zone: UTC-6 (Central (CST))
  - Summer (DST): UTC-5 (CDT)
- FIPS code: 29-64424
- GNIS feature ID: 2396494
- Website: www.stjamesmo.org

St. James or Saint James is a city in Phelps County, Missouri, United States. The population was 3,920 at the 2020 census.

== History ==
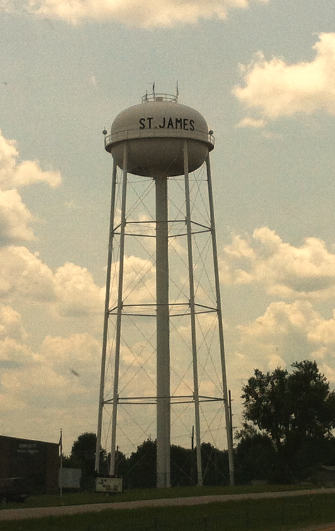
Water tower in St. James

The settlement was originally known as Big Prairie because of its location on the natural prairie of that name in the area. In 1859, when a man by the name of John Wood anticipated the extension of the St. Louis-San Francisco Railway, the settlement became known for a short time as Scioto, named after the town of Scioto, Ohio, where many of the town's early settlers originated. In 1860, the town was named St. James to honor Thomas James, who came from Ohio and created the Meramec Iron Works. The town was intended as a shipping point for the Meramec Iron Works, which had been shipping its products by wagon train.

St. James was the part-time home of Lucy Wortham James, a wealthy philanthropist who had a love for the area. She was a descendant of Thomas James, a Chillicothe banker who founded the Maramec Iron Works. The James Foundation, a charitable organization she founded, was responsible for the St. James City Park and the James Memorial Library, as well as Maramec Spring Park. The City of St. James now owns both the park and the public library.

Mayme Ousley, the first woman elected mayor of a town in Missouri, was first elected mayor of St. James in 1921. The city hall was named after her in 2013.

The Maramec Iron Works District, St. James Chapel, and Verkamp Shelter are listed on the National Register of Historic Places.

== Geography ==
St. James is located in the foothills of the Ozark Mountains at 37°59′56″N 91°36′59″W (37.998848, −91.616386). According to the United States Census Bureau, the city has a total area of 4.29 square miles (11.11 km^{2}), of which 4.28 square miles (11.09 km^{2}) is land and 0.01 square miles (0.03 km^{2}) is water.

== Demographics ==
Historical population
| Census | Pop. | Note | %± |
|---|---|---|---|
| 1880 | 392 | | — |
| 1890 | 467 | | 19.1% |
| 1900 | 575 | | 23.1% |
| 1910 | 1,100 | | 91.3% |
| 1920 | 1,117 | | 1.5% |
| 1930 | 1,294 | | 15.8% |
| 1940 | 1,812 | | 40.0% |
| 1950 | 1,996 | | 10.2% |
| 1960 | 2,384 | | 19.4% |
| 1970 | 2,929 | | 22.9% |
| 1980 | 3,328 | | 13.6% |
| 1990 | 3,256 | | −2.2% |
| 2000 | 3,704 | | 13.8% |
| 2010 | 4,216 | | 13.8% |
| 2020 | 3,935 | | −6.7% |
U.S. Decennial Census

=== 2020 census ===
As of the 2020 census, St. James had a population of 3,935. The median age was 39.1 years. 25.5% of residents were under the age of 18 and 21.2% were 65 years of age or older. For every 100 females, there were 97.8 males, and for every 100 females age 18 and over, there were 93.0 males age 18 and over.

0.0% of residents lived in urban areas, while 100.0% lived in rural areas.

There were 1,594 households, of which 30.2% had children under the age of 18 living in them. Of all households, 38.8% were married-couple households, 19.4% were households with a male householder and no spouse or partner present, and 35.3% were households with a female householder and no spouse or partner present. About 34.6% of all households were made up of individuals, and 16.0% had someone living alone who was 65 years of age or older.

There were 1,751 housing units, of which 9.0% were vacant. The homeowner vacancy rate was 1.9%, and the rental vacancy rate was 8.4%.

Racial composition as of the 2020 census
| Race | Number | Percent |
|---|---|---|
| White | 3,535 | 89.8% |
| Black or African American | 39 | 1.0% |
| American Indian and Alaska Native | 18 | 0.5% |
| Asian | 36 | 0.9% |
| Native Hawaiian and Other Pacific Islander | 0 | 0.0% |
| Some other race | 20 | 0.5% |
| Two or more races | 287 | 7.3% |
| Hispanic or Latino (of any race) | 118 | 3.0% |

=== 2010 census ===
As of the census of 2010, there were 4,216 people, 1,632 households, and 1,029 families residing in the city. The population density was 985.0 inhabitants per square mile (380.3/km^{2}). There were 1,767 housing units at an average density of 412.9 per square mile (159.4/km^{2}). The racial makeup of the city was 96.11% White, 0.95% Black or African American, 0.66% Native American, 0.28% Asian, 0.38% from other races, and 1.61% from two or more races. Hispanic or Latino of any race were 1.57% of the population.

There were 1,632 households, of which 35.3% had children under the age of 18 living with them, 41.4% were married couples living together, 18.0% had a female householder with no husband present, 3.7% had a male householder with no wife present, and 36.9% were non-families. 31.6% of all households were made up of individuals, and 14.6% had someone living alone who was 65 years of age or older. The average household size was 2.37 and the average family size was 2.94.

The median age in the city was 37 years. 27.3% of residents were under the age of 18; 9.2% were between the ages of 18 and 24; 22.5% were from 25 to 44; 22.3% were from 45 to 64, and 18.7% were 65 years of age or older. The gender makeup of the city was 49.2% male and 50.8% female.

== Economy ==
Tacony Corporation manufactures Simplicity and Riccar vacuum cleaners in St. James.

Cost Effective Equipment – Founded in 1987 and headquartered in St. James, Cost Effective Equipment is a privately held manufacturer of precision semiconductor wafer-processing equipment. The company designs and produces spin coaters, bake plates, bonders, debonders, and integrated workstations used in research, development, and low-volume production environments worldwide.

== Education ==
Public education in St. James is administered by St. James R-I School District.

St. James has a public library, the James Memorial Library.

== Arts and culture ==
St. James is home to several award-winning wineries, including St. James Winery. It is also home to Maramec Spring Park.

The Maramec Spring Park contains the fifth largest spring in the state. An average of 100 million gallons of water flows from the Spring daily. Maramec Spring Park contains 1,860 acres of forest and fields. The 200-acre public use area of the park provides many amenities and activities for visitors such as a cafe, store, camping, wildlife viewing, fish feeding, picnicking, shelters, playgrounds and fishing. The Meramec River, a clear calm Ozark stream, flows through the park providing excellent fishing.

The park is open year-round to the public. A daily entry fee is required to enter the park from mid-February through October. Annual passes may be purchased at the park.

Maramec Spring Park is privately owned and operated by The James Foundation.

== Media ==
The St. James Leader-Journal was the Voice of St. James since 1896 and was in continual operation for a longer period of time than any other business in the St. James City Limits, until it was closed on July 13, 2016. The weekly newspaper was owned by GateHouse Media. The Leader-Journal was a sister paper of The Rolla Daily News and the Waynesville Daily Guide. The Guide closed in 2018 and the Daily News was merged into the Phelps County Focus in 2021.

== See also ==
- List of cities in Missouri
