= KZNN =

Radio station in Rolla, Missouri

Coordinates: 37°52′39″N 91°44′45″W

- Rolla, Missouri; United States
- Frequency: 105.3 MHz
- Branding: Country Superstation 105.3 KZNN

Programming
- Format: Country music

Ownership
- Owner: KTTR-KZNN, Inc.

Technical information
- Licensing authority: FCC
- Facility ID: 35682
- Class: C1
- ERP: 100,000 watts
- HAAT: 192 meters (630 ft)

Links
- Public license information: Public file; LMS
- Website: resultsradioonline.com

KZNN 105.3 FM is a radio station licensed to Rolla, Missouri. The station broadcasts a country music format and is owned by KTTR-KZNN, Inc.

KZNN is the local affiliate for The Big Time with Whitney Allen show. They also feature local radio personalities & feature local traffic/news/weather in partnership with Results Radio.
