= Abbott Branch =

Stream in Missouri, U.S.

Abbotts Branch
- Location of Abbott Branch mouth

Location
- Country: United States
- State: Missouri
- County: Iron

Physical characteristics
- Source: unnamed tributary to North Fork Black River divide
  - location: about 5 miles northeast of East End, Missouri
  - coordinates: 37°41′50″N 90°59′02″W
  - elevation: 1,280 ft (390 m)
- Mouth: Courtois Creek
  - location: about 0.25 miles south of Good Water, Missouri
  - coordinates: 37°42′30″N 91°02′42″W
  - elevation: 1,014 ft (309 m)
- Length: 3.86 mi (6.21 km)
- Basin size: 3.50 square miles (9.1 km^{2})
- Discharge
  - location: Courtois Creek
  - average: 6.17 cu ft/s (0.175 m^{3}/s) at mouth with Courtois Creek

Basin features
- Progression: Courtois Creek → Huzzah Creek → Meramec River → Mississippi River → Gulf of Mexico
- River system: Meramec River
- Tributaries
  - left: unnamed tributaries
  - right: unnamed tributaries
- Bridges: County Road 4, County Road 2

Abbott Branch is a stream in northern Iron County, Missouri. It is a tributary of Courtois Creek.

The community of Good Water lies on Courtois Creek about 2000 feet north of the confluence and Missouri Route Z crosses the stream about 1000 feet east of the confluence. The headwaters of the stream arise just north of Missouri Route 32 about 1.2 miles (1.9 km) east-southeast of the confluence. Viburnum lies about 4.0 miles (6.4 km) west of the confluence.

Abbott Branch has the name of Robert Abbott, an early settler.

== Variant names ==
According to the Geographic Names Information System, it has also been known historically as:

- Courtois Creek

== Course ==
Abbott Branch rises about 5 miles northeast of East End, Missouri, in Iron County and then flows generally west to join Courtois Creek about 0.25 miles south of Good Water.

== Watershed ==
Abbotts Branch drains 3.50 square miles (9.1 km^{2}) of area, receives about 45.1 in/year of precipitation, has a wetness index of 325.98, and is about 90% forested.

== See also ==
- List of rivers of Missouri
