= Palmer Creek =

Palmer Creek may refer to:

- Palmer Creek (Turnagain Arm), Alaska, US
- Palmer Creek (Georgia)
- Palmer Creek (Minnesota)
- Palmer Creek (Big Creek tributary), a stream in Missouri
- Palmer Creek (New York)
- Palmer Creek (Applegate River tributary), Oregon, US
- Palmer Creek (Yamhill River tributary), Oregon, US
