= National Register of Historic Places listings in Iron County, Missouri =

Location of Iron County in Missouri

This is a list of the National Register of Historic Places listings in Iron County, Missouri.

This is intended to be a complete list of the properties and districts on the National Register of Historic Places in Iron County, Missouri, United States. Latitude and longitude coordinates are provided for many National Register properties and districts; these locations may be seen together in a map.

There are 6 properties and districts listed on the National Register in Iron County.

This National Park Service list is complete through NPS recent listings posted March 14, 2025.

== Current listings ==
	Name on the Register	Image	Date listed	Location	City or town	Description
1	Fort Davidson	Fort Davidson	February 26, 1970 (#70000332)	On Route 21, south of its junction with Route V in the Clark National Forest; 37°37′45″N 90°38′24″W	Pilot Knob	
2	Immanuel Evangelical Lutheran Church	Immanuel Evangelical Lutheran Church	January 22, 1979 (#79001364)	E Pine and N Zeigler St. 37°37′34″N 90°38′29″W	Pilot Knob	
3	Iron County Courthouse Buildings	Iron County Courthouse Buildings	June 27, 1979 (#79001363)	Courthouse Sq. and 220 S. Shepherd St. 37°35′52″N 90°37′41″W	Ironton	
4	Ironton Lodge Hall	Ironton Lodge Hall	April 23, 2013 (#13000191)	133 N. Main St. 37°35′59″N 90°37′48″W	Ironton	
5	St. Paul's Episcopal Church	St. Paul's Episcopal Church	May 21, 1969 (#69000107)	Northwestern corner of Knob and Reynolds Sts. 37°35′59″N 90°37′36″W	Ironton	
6	Ursuline Academy-Arcadia College Historic District	Ursuline Academy-Arcadia College Historic District	July 1, 1998 (#98000816)	Junction of Maine and Maple Sts. 37°35′02″N 90°37′45″W	Arcadia	

== See also ==
- List of National Historic Landmarks in Missouri
- National Register of Historic Places listings in Missouri
