= Indian Creek (Courtois Creek tributary) =

Stream in the American state of Missouri

Location
- Country: United States
- State: Missouri
- Region: Iron and Washington counties

Physical characteristics
- Source
  - location: Iron County, Missouri
  - coordinates: 37°39′47″N 91°04′30″W
- Mouth
  - location: Washington County, Missouri
  - coordinates: 37°45′54″N 91°04′17″W
  - elevation: 270 m (890 ft)

Indian Creek is a stream in Iron and Washington counties of eastern Missouri. It is a tributary of Courtois Creek.

The source is located in northern Iron County and the confluence with Courtois Creek is in southwest Washington County. The headwaters are along Missouri Route 32 just east of Bixby and the stream flows north to the east of Viburnum and into the southwest corner of Washington County to its confluence at Courtois.

Indian Creek was named for traces of Native American settlement found along its course.

== See also ==
- List of rivers of Missouri
