= Possum Trot Creek =

Stream in the US state of Missouri

Possum Trot Creek is a stream in Crawford and Iron counties in the U.S. state of Missouri. It is a tributary of Huzzah Creek.

The stream headwaters arise in the northwest corner of Iron County just northwest of Viburnum (at 37°43′17″N 91°08′18″W) and the stream flows northwest to its confluence with Huzzah Creek in Crawford County (at 37°45′56″N 91°10′25″W). Mill Rock Creek enters the Huzzah just downstream from Possum Trot Creek.

Possum Trot Creek, also called Possum Creek, was named for the fact it was a favorite hunting ground of opossums by early settlers.

== See also ==
- List of rivers of Missouri
