= Mill Rock Creek =

Stream in the US state of Missouri

Mill Rock Creek is a stream in Crawford and Iron counties in the U.S. state of Missouri. It is a tributary of Huzzah Creek.

The stream headwaters arise in the northwest corner of Iron County just north of Viburnum (at 37°44′00″N 91°07′40″W) and the stream flows northwest to its confluence with Huzzah Creek in Crawford County (at 37°46′00″N 91°10′17″W). Possum Trot Creek enters the Huzzah just upstream from Mill Rock Creek.

Mill Rock Creek was named for the fact the watercourse was the source of millstones.

== See also ==
- List of rivers of Missouri
