= Ketcherside Mountain =

Summit in the American state of Missouri

- Location within Missouri

Highest point
- Elevation: 1,698 ft (518 m)
- Coordinates: 37°31′25″N 90°40′08″W

Geography
- Location: Iron County, Missouri, U.S.
- Parent range: Saint Francois Mountains
- Topo map: USGS Ironton

Ketcherside Mountain is a summit in Iron County in the U.S. state of Missouri. The peak lies about 4 1/2 miles (7 km) southeast of Taum Sauk Mountain and about 6 1/2 miles (10 km) south-southwest of Ironton. Hogan and Hogan Mountain lie to the west-southwest.

Ketcherside Mountain has the name of the local Ketcherside (or Catcherside) family.
