= Minor Creek (Missouri) =

Stream in the American state of Missouri

Location
- Country: United States
- State: Missouri
- Region: Iron County

Physical characteristics
- Source
  - location: Iron County, Missouri
  - coordinates: 37°34′05″N 90°41′37″W
- Mouth
  - location: Iron County, Missouri
  - coordinates: 37°32′03″N 90°40′55″W
  - elevation: 295 m (968 ft)

Minor Creek is a stream in Iron County in the U.S. state of Missouri. It is a tributary of Big Creek. Routes 72 and 21 pass through the lower stream valley southwest of Ironton. Minor Creek meets with Claybaugh Creek at the headwaters of Royal Gorge and flows through the Gorge to a confluence with Big Creek.

Minor Creek has the name of the local Minor family.

== See also ==
- List of rivers of Missouri
