= Tim McCabe =

American baseball player (1894–1977)

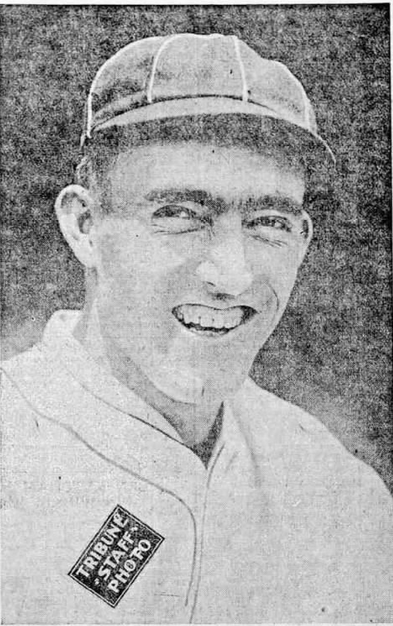
- McCabe with the Salt Lake City Bees, 1918
- Pitcher
- Born: October 19, 1894; Graniteville, Missouri, U.S.
- Died: April 12, 1977 (aged 82); Ironton, Missouri, U.S.
- Batted: Right Threw: Right

MLB debut
- August 16, 1915, for the St. Louis Browns

Last MLB appearance
- July 27, 1918, for the St. Louis Browns

MLB statistics
- Win–loss record: 5-1
- Earned run average: 2.92
- Strikeouts: 26
- Stats at Baseball Reference

Teams
- St. Louis Browns (1915–1918)

Timothy J. McCabe (October 19, 1894 – April 12, 1977) was an American Major League Baseball pitcher who appeared for the St. Louis Browns over parts of the four seasons from 1915 through 1918, mostly in relief.

== Early life and career ==
McCabe was born on October 19, 1894, in Graniteville, Missouri. In the early 1910s, he pitched for local baseball clubs in the Iron County, Missouri area. In August 1913, McCabe traveled to St. Louis to try out with the St. Louis Cardinals of the National League after being noticed by former pitcher Barney Pelty. However, by September, scout Charly Barret would sign McCabe for the American League's St. Louis Browns for the 1914 season after McCabe struck out 23 hitters in an exhibition.

McCabe was sent to the Burlington Pathfinders of the Central Association in 1914 to begin his professional career. On September 10, he was transfer to the Browns, six days after their season ended.

He played with the Browns in spring training 1915, but was purchased by the Illinois–Indiana–Iowa League's Decatur Commodores in April. On May 8, he threw a no hitter against the Moline Plowboys.

== Major and minor leagues ==
On August 16, 1915, McCabe made his debut for the Browns against the Chicago White Sox, striking out a batter in a scoreless appearance in the seventh inning. He pitched in seven games in 1915 for St. Louis, including four starts, ending the year with four complete games, a shutout, and a 1.30 earned run average in 41.2 innings. Following the end of the regular season, McCabe won the deciding game for the Browns in the St. Louis city title championship series against the Cardinals.

McCabe worked exclusively in relief for the remainder of his major league career, appearing in 13 games in 1916 and one game in each 1917 and 1918. In early August 1916, the Browns announced they had sent McCabe to the Nashville Volunteers in the Southern Association, but he did not report to the club by August 13. He later appeared in games for the Browns on August 24, September 15 and September 30.

In February 1917, Browns' manager Fielder Jones expressed his desire for McCabe to start regularly for the club in the upcoming season. However, in March, McCabe was diagnosed with appendicitis and missed spring training due to an operation. He returned to the team on April 5, but only appeared in one game on June 29, allowing six earned runs in 2.1 innings against the Detroit Tigers on June 29. His contract was purchased by the Salt Lake City Bees in the Pacific Coast League on July 10, but he returned home to rest for the remainder of the season.

He again was transferred to Salt Lake City in January 1918 under an optional agreement, and won 28 games. While with the Bees, he was ordered to find essential employment or be subjected to possible military service as part of the Selective Service Act of 1917 amid the United States' involvement in World War I. After the Pacific Coast League season ended in mid-July, McCabe returned to the Browns. McCabe pitched in a lone game against the Washington Senators on July 27, allowing two earned runs in 1.1 innings.

McCabe was purchased by the Louisville Colonels of the American Association on March 1, 1919. His preseason training was interrupted due to tonsillitis. By July, he was pitching for a local club in Fredericktown, Missouri. In 1920, he pitched with both the Charleston Palmettos of the South Atlantic League and the Joplin Miners of the Western League before he was purchased by the Rockford Rox of the Illinois–Indiana–Iowa League on June 15.

== Later career and death ==
McCabe continued playing and managing independent Missouri baseball clubs through the 1930s.

He died on April 12, 1977, in Ironton, Missouri.
