= Crane Pond Creek =

Stream in the US state of Missouri

Coordinates: 37°17′11″N 90°31′53″W

Crane Pond Creek is a stream in Iron and Wayne counties in the U.S. state of Missouri.

The stream headwaters are in Iron County approximately 2.5 miles east of Glover at and it flows to the southeast passing the community of Minimum to enter the northwest corner of Wayne County adjacent to the southwest corner of Madison County. The confluence with Big Creek is in Wayne County within the Sam A. Baker State Park at .

Crane Pond Creek was so named on account of cranes which frequented a pond near its course.

== See also ==
- List of rivers of Missouri
