= Vulcan, Missouri =

Unincorporated community in Missouri, U.S.

- Unincorporated community
- Location within Missouri
- Coordinates: 37°18′34″N 90°39′45″W
- Country: United States
- State: Missouri
- County: Iron
- Elevation: 554 ft (169 m)
- Time zone: UTC-6 (Central (CST))
  - Summer (DST): UTC-5 (CDT)
- ZIP codes: 63675
- GNIS feature ID: 728225

Vulcan is an unincorporated community in southern Iron County, Missouri, United States. It is located on Missouri Route 49 between Des Arc two miles to the south and Annapolis 3.5 miles to the north. Ironton is approximately twenty miles north. The community is in the Big Creek valley.

A post office called Vulcan has been in operation since 1895. The community took its name from Vulcan Iron Works.
