= Hogan Mountain =

Mountain in Missouri, United States

- Location within Missouri

Highest point
- Elevation: 1,680 ft (510 m)
- Coordinates: 37°31′11″N 90°42′53″W

Geography
- Location: Iron County, Missouri, U.S.
- Parent range: Saint Francois Mountains
- Topo map: USGS Ironton

Hogan Mountain is a summit in Iron County in the U.S. state of Missouri. Hogan Mountain lies just north of Carver Creek and Missouri Route AA on the south and west. Big Creek and Missouri Route 72 lie to the east with the community of Hogan to the southeast.

Hogan Mountain has the name of Joe Hogan, a businessperson in the local mining industry.
