= Germanville =

Germanville may refer to:

- Germanville Township, Livingston County, Illinois
- Germanville, Nebraska, a ghost town

== See also ==
- Ghermanville, Missouri
