= Parke M. Banta =

American politician (1891–1970)

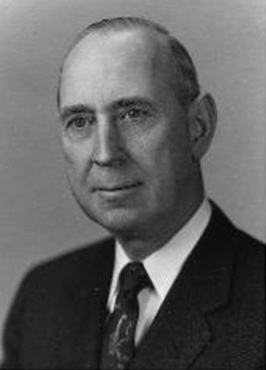

Member of the U.S. House of Representatives from Missouri's 8th district
- In office January 3, 1947 – January 3, 1949
- Preceded by: A. S. J. Carnahan
- Succeeded by: A. S. J. Carnahan

Personal details
- Born: November 21, 1891 Berryman, Missouri, U.S.
- Died: May 12, 1970 (aged 78) Cape Girardeau, Missouri, U.S.
- Party: Republican
- Parent: Cyrus N. Banta (father)

Parke Monroe Banta (November 21, 1891 – May 12, 1970) was a U.S. representative from Missouri's 8th congressional district from 1947 to 1949.

Born in Berryman, Missouri, Banta attended the public schools, and William Jewell College at Liberty, Missouri. He was graduated from Northwestern University Law School at Evanston-Chicago, Illinois, in 1914. He was admitted to the bar in 1913 and practiced at Potosi, Missouri from 1914 to 1925 and at Ironton, Missouri from 1925 to 1941. He served as prosecuting attorney of Washington County, Missouri, in 1917 and 1918. During the First World War he served in the United States Army as a private and advanced through the ranks to first lieutenant from April 1918 to August 1919. He served as a member of the board of trustees of Arcadia, Missouri, in 1928 and 1929. He served as a member of Ironton-Arcadia School Board in 1932 and 1933. He made a failed run for the U.S. House in 1940. Banta was the administrator of the Missouri State Social Security Commission 1941-1945.

Banta was elected as a Republican to the Eightieth Congress (January 3, 1947 – January 3, 1949), interrupting the tenure of Democrat A.S.J. Carnahan. He was an unsuccessful candidate for re-election in 1948 to the Eighty-first Congress and for election in 1950 to the Eighty-second Congress. In his single term he introduced no bills or resolutions and moved no amendments from the floor. He resumed the practice of law in Ironton, Missouri. He served as general counsel for Department of Health, Education, and Welfare, Washington, D.C., from April 11, 1953, until January 20, 1961. He retired. He died in Cape Girardeau, Missouri, May 12, 1970. He was interred in New Masonic Cemetery, Potosi, Missouri.

U.S. House of Representatives
| Preceded by A. S. J. Carnahan | Member of the U.S. House of Representatives from Missouri's 8th congressional district 1947–1949 | Succeeded by A. S. J. Carnahan |
