= Courtois Creek =

Stream in Missouri, U.S.

Courtois Creek Tributary to Huzzah Creek
- Location of Courtois Creek mouth Courtois Creek (the United States)

Location
- Country: United States
- State: Missouri
- County: Crawford; Iron; Washington

Physical characteristics
- Source: North Fork Black River divide
  - location: near Viburnum, Missouri
  - coordinates: 37°41′02″N 091°00′41″W
  - elevation: 1,280 ft (390 m)
- Mouth: Huzzah Creek
  - location: Scotia, Missouri
  - coordinates: 38°01′36″N 091°12′43″W
  - elevation: 636 ft (194 m)
- Length: 37.50 mi (60.35 km)
- Basin size: 222 sq mi (570 km^{2})
- Discharge
  - location: Huzzah Creek
  - average: 269.89 cu ft/s (7.642 m^{3}/s) at mouth with Huzzah Creek

Basin features
- Progression: Huzzah Creek → Meramec River → Mississippi River → Gulf of Mexico
- River system: Meramec River
- Tributaries
  - left: Indian Creek, Bailey Branch
  - right: Abbott Branch, Andys Branch, Cub Creek, Loomis Branch, Johns Creek, Hazel Creek, Lost Creek, Billys Branch
- Bridges: County Road 80 (x2), Highway Z, Frank Bay Road, MO 80A, Old Highway C, State Highway C, Bailey Branch Road, Brazil Road, Gobblers Knob Road, Blunt Road, Butts Road

Courtois Creek (locally /ˈkoʊtəweɪ/ KOH-tə-way) is a 38.6-mile-long (62.1 km) stream in southern Missouri, United States. It shares its name with the nearby town of Courtois and is in the Courtois Hills region of the Missouri Ozarks. According to the information in the Ramsay Place Names File at the University of Missouri, the creek was "doubtless named for some French settler, but his identity has not been ascertained".

The stream arises in the Mark Twain National Forest in northern Iron County, just north of Missouri Route 32 about four miles east of Bixby, and flows northward, passing about four miles east of Viburnum. The stream enters the southwest corner of Washington County, flows past Courtois and on north through the Mark Twain National Forest, entering Crawford County just south of Berryman and passing under Missouri Route 8 just west of that village. It flows on northwest through the Missouri Ozarks of Crawford County, roughly paralleling the course of Huzzah Creek to its west. It flows into Huzzah Creek just before the latter's confluence with the Meramec River, near the Crawford County Highway E bridge just east of Scotia.

The creek is popular year-round for canoeing, kayaking, and rafting. It is surrounded by dense stands of trees and native vegetation, has abundant fish, turtles and waterfowl, and is the best-protected stream in the area against erosion. The St. Louis Riverfront Times cited the creek as the best local float trip in 2007.

== Variant names ==
According to the Geographic Names Information System, it has also been known historically as:

- Coataway Creek
- Cotoway Creek
- Courtoi Creek
- Fourch Courtois Creek
- Huzza Creek
