= Palmer Creek (Big Creek tributary) =

Stream in the U.S. state of Missouri

Coordinates: 37°31′45″N 90°41′13″W

Palmer Creek is a stream in Iron County in the U.S. state of Missouri. It is a tributary of Big Creek.

The stream headwaters arise on the south flank of Taum Sauk Mountain at and an elevation of approximately 1220 feet. The stream flows generally east for approximately two miles to its confluence with Big River south of Royal Gorge and adjacent to Missouri routes 72 and 21. The confluence is at and an elevation of 942 feet.

Palmer Creek the name Parmer is a corruption of Parmer, the surname of a pioneer citizen.

== See also ==
- List of rivers of Missouri
