= Hyatts Creek =

Stream in the American state of Missouri

Coordinates: 37°22′14″N 90°48′15″W

Hyatts Creek is a stream in southwest Iron and northeast Reynolds counties in the U.S. state of Missouri. It is a tributary of the Black River.

The stream headwaters arise in Iron County approximately four miles northwest of the community of Sabula. It flows south-southeast for a distance of about 4.5 miles to its confluence with Black River approximately 5.5 miles southeast of Lesterville.

Hyatts Creek has the name of Seth Hyatt, a pioneer citizen.

== See also ==
- List of rivers of Missouri
