= Sulphur Creek (Crane Pond Creek tributary) =

Stream in the US state of Missouri

Sulphur Creek is a stream in eastern Iron County in the U.S. state of Missouri. It is a tributary of Crane Pond Creek.

The stream headwaters arise at 37°25′13″N 90°38′40″W and the confluence with Crane Pond Creek is at 37°22′06″N 90°34′58″W. The source area is in Clark National Forest and the stream flows south and southeast out of the forest area. It passes under Missouri Route C before its confluence with Crane Pond Creek south of the community of Minimum.

Sulphur Creek was so named due to the occurrence of iron ore along the stream which settlers mistook for sulphur.

== See also ==
- List of rivers of Missouri
