= Good Water, Missouri =

Unincorporated community in Missouri, U.S.

- Unincorporated community
- Location within Missouri
- Coordinates: 37°42′48″N 91°02′46″W
- Country: United States
- State: Missouri
- County: Iron
- Elevation: 1,011 ft (308 m)
- Time zone: UTC-6 (Central (CST))
  - Summer (DST): UTC-5 (CDT)
- Area code: 573
- GNIS feature ID: 750071

Good Water is an unincorporated community in northwest Iron County, in the U.S. state of Missouri.

The community is on Missouri Route Z approximately 4.5 miles due east of Viburnum and 3.5 miles southeast of Courtois in adjacent Washington County. Courtois Creek flows past the site.

== History ==
A post office called Good Water was established in 1871, and remained in operation until 1943. The community was so named for the superior quality of the springwater near the original town site.
