= Middlebrook, Missouri =

Unincorporated community in Missouri, U.S.

- Unincorporated community
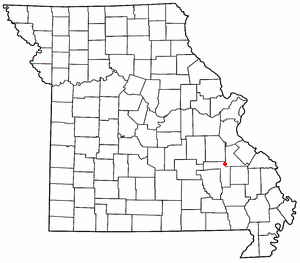
- Location of Middlebrook in Missouri
- Coordinates: 37°39′46″N 90°38′54″W
- Country: United States
- State: Missouri
- County: Iron, St. Francois
- Elevation: 1,132 ft (345 m)
- Time zone: UTC-6 (Central (CST))
  - Summer (DST): UTC-5 (CDT)
- Area code: 573
- GNIS feature ID: 756387

Middlebrook is an unincorporated community on the Iron County/St. Francois County line in the U.S. state of Missouri. It is located approximately six miles north of Ironton, four miles east of Belleview, and seven miles southeast of Belgrade and Caledonia.

Middlebrook was laid out in 1856. A post office called Middlebrook was established in 1858.
