= Claybaugh Creek =

Stream in the US state of Missouri

Claybaugh Creek is a stream in the Saint Francois Mountains of Iron County in the U.S. state of Missouri.

The headwaters arise high on the south slope of Taum Sauk Mountain about 2000 feet south of the lookout at an elevation of about 1620 feet at 37°33′52″N 90°43′21″W. The stream flows south and east to its confluence with Minor Creek at the head of Royal Gorge, adjacent to Missouri Route 21 at 37°32′35″N 90°40′56″W at an elevation of 1063 feet.

Claybaugh Creek bears the name of an early local charcoal producer.

== See also ==
- List of rivers of Missouri
