= Pin Hook, Iron County, Missouri =

Pin Hook, Missouri
- Unincorporated community
- Location within Missouri Location within the United States
- Coordinates: 37°40′45″N 90°44′09″W
- Country: United States
- State: Missouri
- County: Iron
- Elevation: 1,056 ft (322 m)
- Time zone: UTC-6 (Central (CST))
  - Summer (DST): UTC-5 (CDT)
- Area code: 573
- GNIS feature ID: 736624

Pin Hook is an unincorporated community in Iron County, in the U.S. state of Missouri. Pin Hook is on Missouri Route 21 approximately one mile southeast of Belleview.

The community may be named after a nearby meander on Townsen Creek.
