= Wallace Hollow =

Valley in Missouri, United States

Coordinates: 37.594503°N 90.709407°W

Wallace Hollow is a valley in Iron County in the U.S. state of Missouri.

Wallace Hollow has the name of the local Wallace family.
