= Dans Branch =

Stream in the US state of Missouri

Coordinates: 37°56′37″N 91°06′46″W

Dans Branch is a stream in eastern Crawford County in the U.S. state of Missouri. It is a tributary of Courtois Creek.

The namesake of Dans Branch is unknown.

== See also ==
- List of rivers of Missouri
