= Townsen Creek =

Stream in the American state of Missouri

Townsen Creek is a stream in Iron County in the U.S. state of Missouri.

The stream headwaters arise at 37°38′47″N 90°43′23″W and the stream flows west and then north passing under Missouri Route 21 to its confluence with Belleview Creek just east of Belleview at 37°41′16″N 90°43′59″W.

Townsen Creek derives its name from Bill Townsend, an early settler.

== See also ==
- List of rivers of Missouri
