= St. Paul's Episcopal Church (Ironton, Missouri) =

Historic church in Missouri, United States

- U.S. National Register of Historic Places
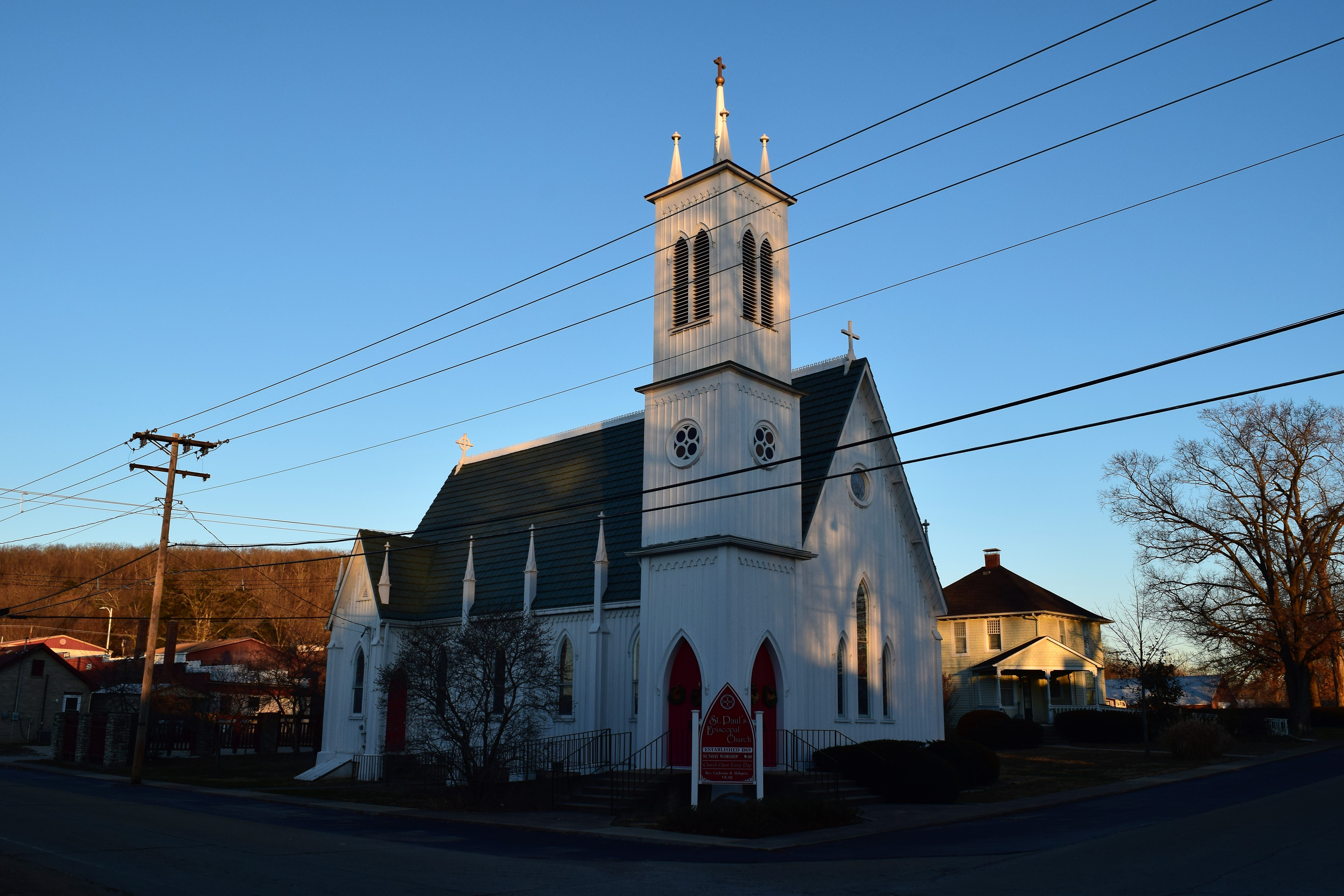

- Location within Missouri Location within the United States
- Location: NW corner of Knob and Reynolds Sts., Ironton, Missouri
- Coordinates: 37°35′59″N 90°37′36″W
- Area: 0.6 acres (0.24 ha)
- Built: 1870
- Architectural style: Gothic Revival
- NRHP reference No.: 69000107
- Added to NRHP: May 21, 1969

St. Paul's Episcopal Church is a historic Episcopal church located at the northwestern corner of Knob and Reynolds Streets in Ironton, Iron County, Missouri. It was built between 1870 and 1871 and is a rectangular, Gothic Revival–style frame building. It measures 23 by 60 feet (7.0 by 18.3 m). It has a steep ridge roof and three story corner bell tower.

It was listed on the National Register of Historic Places in 1969.
