= Hoover Hollow =

Valley in Missouri, United States

Coordinates: 37.6894908°N 91.0406869°W

Hoover Hollow is a valley in Iron County in the U.S. state of Missouri.

Hoover Hollow has the name of a pioneer citizen.
