= Chloride, Missouri =

- Unincorporated community
- Location within Missouri Location within the United States
- Coordinates: 37°27′38″N 90°41′13″W
- Country: United States
- State: Missouri
- County: Iron
- Elevation: 801 ft (244 m)
- Time zone: UTC-6 (Central (CST))
  - Summer (DST): UTC-5 (CDT)
- Area code: 573
- GNIS feature ID: 749349

Chloride is an unincorporated community in Iron County, in the U.S. state of Missouri. Chloride is located on Big Creek along Missouri Route 49. The community is approximately 1.5 miles south of the lead smelter at Glover.

== History ==
A post office called Chloride was established in 1904, and remained in operation until 1953. The community's name is a transfer from Chloride, Arizona, the onetime home of an early settler.
