= Womble Hollow =

Valley in Missouri, United States

Coordinates: 37.613382°N 90.774291°W

Womble HollowWomble Hollow is a valley in Iron County in the U.S. state of Missouri, north of Sawyer School.

Womble Hollow was named after the local Womble family.
