= Sabula, Missouri =

Unincorporated community in Iron County, Missouri, United States

- Unincorporated community
- Location within Missouri Location within the United States
- Coordinates: 37°24′17″N 90°41′46″W
- Country: United States
- State: Missouri
- County: Iron
- Elevation: 689 ft (210 m)
- Time zone: UTC-6 (Central (CST))
  - Summer (DST): UTC-5 (CDT)
- Area code: 573
- GNIS feature ID: 751995

Sabula is an unincorporated community in southwest Iron County, Missouri, United States. The community is on the east floodplain of Big Creek along Missouri Route 49 between Annapolis three miles (4.8 km) to the south and Glover about 5.5 miles (8.9 km) to the north.

== History ==
Sabula was originally called Reynolds, and under the latter name was platted in 1873 when the railroad was extended to that point. A post office called Sabula was established in 1884, and remained in operation until 1953.
