= Marys Hollow =

Valley in the American state of Missouri

Marys Hollow is a valley in Crawford County in the U.S. state of Missouri. The headwaters of the intermittent stream in the valley are at 37°53′29″N 91°11′09″W and the confluence with Huzzah Creek is at 37°54′27″N 91°10′04″W.

Marys Hollow was named after Mary Gillam, an early settler.
