= Minimum (disambiguation) =

Minimum is a numerical concept.

Minimum (Latin for least or smallest) may also refer to:

- Minimum, Missouri, community in the United States

== See also ==
- Minima naturalia, in Aristotelian physics
- Mini mum, species of microhylid frog endemic to Madagascar
