= Warren Hollow =

Valley in Missouri, United States

Coordinates: 37.726157°N 91.047355°W

Warren Hollow is a valley in Iron County in the U.S. state of Missouri.

Warren Hollow has the name of a pioneer citizen.
