= Royal Gorge (Missouri) =

Valley in Missouri, U.S.

Coordinates: 37.541716°N 90.682621°W

Royal Gorge is a gap in Iron County in the U.S. state of Missouri. The gap is at a point where Minor Creek cuts through a ridge in Ketcherside Mountain. Routes 72 and 21 pass through the gap southwest of Ironton.

Royal Gorge most likely takes its name from the gorge of the same name in Colorado.
