= Ironton Lodge Hall =

- U.S. National Register of Historic Places
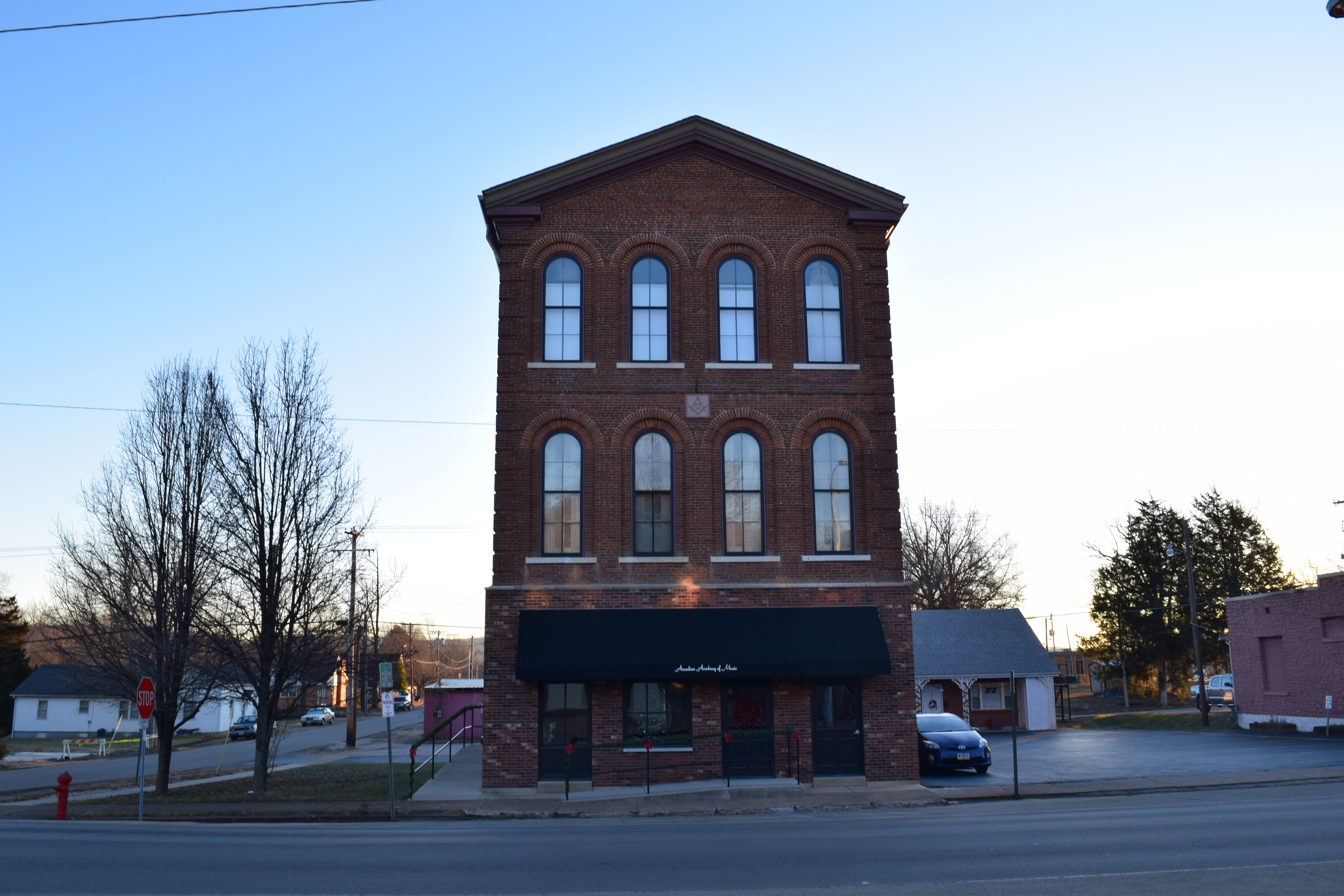

- Location within Missouri Location within the United States
- Location: 133 N. Main St., Ironton, Missouri
- Coordinates: 37°35′59″N 90°37′48″W
- Area: Less than 1 acre (0.40 ha)
- Built: 1873
- Architect: Forester, C. W.
- Architectural style: Greek Revival, Italianate
- NRHP reference No.: 13000191
- Added to NRHP: April 23, 2013

Ironton Lodge Hall, also known as Star of the West Lodge, No. 133,A. F. & A. M. Building; and Iron Lodge No. 107. I.O.O.F., is a historic lodge hall located at Ironton, Iron County, Missouri. It was built in 1873, and is a three-story, rectangular brick building with Italianate and Greek Revival style design elements. It measures 29 feet by 57 feet. It was built to serve primarily as a meeting place for fraternal lodges.

It has served as a Masonic lodge building and as an IOOF hall, and as of 2014 houses the Arcadian Academy of Music.

It was listed on the National Register of Historic Places in 2013.
