= Graves Branch =

Stream in the American state of Missouri

Coordinates: 37.7803239°N 91.0159663°W

Graves Branch is a stream in Washington County in the U.S. state of Missouri. It is a tributary of Cub Creek.

Graves Branch has the name of the local Graves family.

== See also ==
- List of rivers of Missouri
