= Pinhook =

Pinhook or Pin Hook may refer to:

- Pinhook, Franklin County, Indiana
- Pinhook, LaPorte County, Indiana
- Pinhook, Lawrence County, Indiana
- Pinhook, Wayne County, Indiana
- Pinhook, Missouri
- Pin Hook, Iron County, Missouri
- Pin Hook, Alabama
- Crittenden, Kentucky, formerly known as Pin Hook
- Pin Hook, Texas
- The Pinhook, Durham, North Carolina

== See also ==
- Pinhook Corners, Oklahoma
