= Cyrus N. Banta =

American politician

Member of the Missouri House of Representatives from Washington County
- In office 1907–1908

Personal details
- Born: December 7, 1850 Burlington, Iowa, U.S.
- Died: October 19, 1929 (aged 78) Berryman, Missouri, U.S.
- Party: Republican
- Children: Parke M. Banta

Cyrus N. Banta (December 7, 1850 – October 19, 1929) was an American politician. He served as a Republican member of the Missouri House of Representatives.

== Life and career ==
Banta was born in Burlington, Iowa. He was a city attorney in La Plata, Missouri.

Banta served in the Missouri House of Representatives from 1907 to 1908.

Banta died on October 19, 1929, in Berryman, Missouri, at the age of 78.
