= Cub Creek (Courtois Creek tributary) =

Stream in the US state of Missouri

Coordinates: 37°47′34″N 91°03′34″W

Cub Creek is a stream in Iron and Washington counties in the U.S. state of Missouri. It is a tributary of Courtois Creek.

The stream headwaters are at and the confluence with Courtois Creek is at . The stream source area is in northern Iron County adjacent to the intersection of routes 32 and DD. The stream flows north to northwest into Washington County past Quaker. It then flows west parallel to route C to its confluence with Courtois Creek north of Courtois. The stream lies within the Mark Twain National Forest.

Cub Creek received its name on account of bears in the area.

== See also ==
- List of rivers of Missouri
