= Devils Den Hollow =

Valley in Missouri, United States

Coordinates: 37.5703287°N 90.5820656°W

Devils Den Hollow is a valley in Iron County in the U.S. state of Missouri.

Devils Den Hollow was so named on account of its treacherous terrain.
