= Chloride (disambiguation) =

Chloride is a compound of chlorine as a salt or an ester of hydrogen chloride.

Chloride may also refer to:

- Chloride, Arizona, United States
- Chloride, Missouri, an unincorporated community
- Chloride, New Mexico, an unincorporated community
- Chloride Group, a UK supplier of secure power systems
- Chloride Electrical Storage Company, a UK manufacturer of storage batteries
