= Scotia, Missouri =

Unincorporated community in Missouri, US

Coordinates: 38°01′40″N 91°12′50″W

Scotia is an unincorporated community in eastern Crawford County, in the U.S. state of Missouri. The community is located on the south bank of Huzzah Creek, approximately one mile southeast of that stream's confluence with the Meramec River. The community is accessed from the south via Missouri Route E.

== History ==
A post office called Scotia was established in 1885, and remained in operation until 1942. The community was named after the local Scotia Iron Company.
