= Iron County Courthouse =

Iron County Courthouse may refer to:

- Iron County Courthouse (Michigan), Crystal Falls, Michigan
- Old Iron County Courthouse, Hurley, Wisconsin
- Iron County Courthouse (Missouri), Ironton, Missouri
