= Redmondville =

Redmondville may refer to:

- Redmondville, Missouri, an unincorporated community in Iron County
- Redmondville, New Brunswick, an unincorporated community in Northumberland County
