= Billys Branch =

Stream in the American state of Missouri

Coordinates: 37°56′00″N 91°06′32″W

Billys Branch (also known as Billy Branch) is a stream in eastern Crawford and western Washington counties of the U.S. state of Missouri. It is a tributary of Courtois Creek.

The confluence is approximately one mile northwest of Berryuman.

Billys Branch was named after an unknown person with the first name Billy.

== See also ==
- List of rivers of Missouri
