= Gibson Creek =

Stream in the American state of Missouri

Gibson Creek (also called Gibson Branch) is a stream in Franklin County in the U.S. state of Missouri. It is a tributary to the Meramec River. The stream headwaters arise at 38°14′30″N 90°53′22″W and the confluence with the Meramec is at 38°17′00″N 90°55′11″W.

Gibson Creek has the name of William Gibson, a pioneer citizen.

== See also ==
- List of rivers of Missouri
