= Clayton Creek =

Stream in Iron County, Missouri, U.S.

Clayton Creek is a stream in southern Iron County in the U.S. state of Missouri. It is a tributary of the Middle Fork of the Black River.

The stream headwaters arise just south of Missouri Route 32 within Clark National Forest at 37°40′06″N 90°56′23″W at an elevation of approximately 1,240 ft (380 m) just south of route 32. The stream flows to the south-southwest past the Keith Springs picnic area and then south for approximately 4.5 miles passing the community of Redmondville just prior to entering the Middle Fork Black River. The confluence with the Middle Fork is just north of Missouri Route 49 at 37°37′10″N 90°58′07″W and an elevation of 876 ft (267 m).

Clayton Creek has the name of a pioneer citizen.

== See also ==
- List of rivers of Missouri
