= Goodland, Iron County, Missouri =

Unincorporated community in Missouri, U.S.

Goodland, Missouri
- Unincorporated community
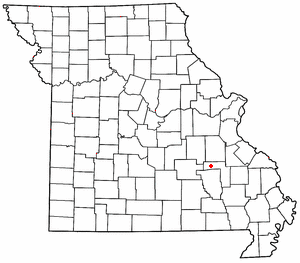
- Location of Goodland within Missouri
- Coordinates: 37.636°N 91.003°W
- Country: United States
- State: Missouri
- County: Iron
- Elevation: 951 ft (290 m)
- Time zone: UTC-6 (Central (CST))
  - Summer (DST): UTC-5 (CDT)
- Area code: 573
- GNIS feature ID: 750074

Goodland is an unincorporated community in western Iron County, Missouri, United States. It is located on a county road, approximately two miles from Route 49 in the Mark Twain National Forest.

== History ==
A post office called Goodland was established in 1882, and remained in operation until 1966. The community was named for the quality of their land.
