= Loomis Branch =

Stream in the American state of Missouri

Coordinates: 37.8069904°N 91.0556898°W

Loomis Branch is a stream in Washington County in the U.S. state of Missouri. It is a tributary of Courtois Creek.

The identity of namesake "Loomis" is unknown.

== See also ==
- List of rivers of Missouri
