= Minimum, Missouri =

- Unincorporated community
- Location within Missouri Location within the United States
- Coordinates: 37°22′34″N 90°35′15″W
- Country: United States
- State: Missouri
- County: Iron
- Elevation: 607 ft (185 m)
- Time zone: UTC-6 (Central (CST))
  - Summer (DST): UTC-5 (CDT)
- Area code: 573
- GNIS feature ID: 751119

Minimum is an unincorporated community in southeastern Iron County, in the U.S. state of Missouri.

The community lies on the banks of Crane Pond Creek, just north of that stream's confluence with Sulphur Creek. It is located at the intersection of Missouri Route C and County Road 134. The town of Annapolis, on Missouri Route 49, is approximately six miles to the west.

== History ==
A post office called Minimum was established in 1904, and remained in operation until 1955. The name "Minimum" is said to be derived from the first name of Minnie Farr, the wife of an early postmaster.
