= Bailey Branch (Courtois Creek tributary) =

Stream in Missouri, U.S.

Coordinates: 37°47′54″N 91°03′35″W

Bailey Branch is a stream in Washington County, in the U.S. state of Missouri. It is a tributary of Courtois Creek.

Bailey Branch has the name of the local Bailey family.

== See also ==
- List of rivers of Missouri
