= A. S. J. Carnahan =

American diplomat (1897–1968)

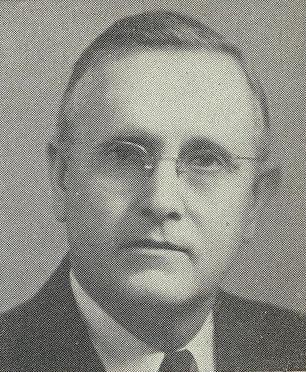

United States Ambassador to Sierra Leone
- In office May 11, 1961 – July 13, 1963
- Preceded by: Herbert Reiner (Interim Chargé d'Affaires)
- Succeeded by: Andrew Vincent Corry

Member of the U.S. House of Representatives from Missouri's 8th district
- In office January 3, 1949 – January 3, 1961
- Preceded by: Parke M. Banta
- Succeeded by: Richard H. Ichord Jr.
- In office January 3, 1945 – January 3, 1947
- Preceded by: William P. Elmer
- Succeeded by: Parke M. Banta

Personal details
- Born: Albert Sidney Johnson Carnahan; January 9, 1897 near Ellsinore, Missouri, U.S.
- Died: March 24, 1968 (aged 71) Rochester, Minnesota
- Party: Democratic
- Spouse: Kathel Schupp (1895–1981)
- Children: 2, including Mel
- Relatives: Carnahan family
- Education: Missouri State Teachers College; University of Missouri

Albert Sidney Johnson Carnahan (January 9, 1897 – March 24, 1968) was an American educator, diplomat and Democratic Party politician who represented southeastern Missouri in the United States House of Representatives for fourteen years between 1945 and 1961. He was the patriarch of the Carnahan family, a prominent political family in Missouri into the 21st century. He began his career as a teacher and school administrator.

== Early life ==
Albert Carnahan was born on January 9, 1897, on a farm near Ellsinore, Missouri, the youngest of 10 children. He was named after the Confederate General Albert Sidney Johnston. He attended Crommertown School, a one-room schoolhouse in Carter County.

In 1914, at the age of 17, Carnahan began a career as an educator. He taught at Crommertown, Hogan Hollow and Ellsinore, Missouri. For a year during World War I, he served in an aviation unit of the Navy at a station in Ireland. Upon returning home, he completed his high school education at the College High School in Cape Girardeau, Missouri. He earned a bachelor's degree in education in 1926 from the Missouri State Teachers College in Cape Girardeau, now called Southeast Missouri State University. Carnahan taught in southeastern Missouri for several years before enrolling at the University of Missouri in Columbia, Missouri, from which earned his master's degree in 1932. For the next several years, Carnahan was a high school administrator serving Carter, Reynolds, and Shannon counties, rising to the post of superintendent of schools in Ellsinore. Mr. Carnahan married Kathel Schupp, with whom he raised two sons, Robert E. and Melvin E.

== Political career ==
In 1944, Carnahan was elected to represent Missouri's 8th Congressional District in the House of Representatives as a Democrat. He served only one term before being defeated in 1946, but ran again in 1948 and won. Carnahan served in the House for another six consecutive terms, but failed to win the Democratic Party's nomination for his own seat in 1960. As a Member of Congress, Mr. Carnahan served on the House Committee on Foreign Affairs, beginning with his first term, and at the time of his retirement was the ranking member of that Committee. For several years, he served as Chairman of the Subcommittee on International Organizations and Movements and the Subcommittee on Africa. He helped write such major legislation as the GI Bill, the Marshall Plan, the Area Development Act, and a revision of the Social Security statutes, was a delegate to the 12th General Assembly of the United Nations in 1957, and served as Congressional Advisor to the U. S. Delegation to the Second International Conference on Peaceful Uses of Atomic Energy in Geneva in 1958. Carnahan did not sign the 1956 Southern Manifesto, and voted in favor of the Civil Rights Acts of 1957 and 1960. In 1961, Carnahan was appointed by President John F. Kennedy as the first United States Ambassador to Sierra Leone. He retired from this post in 1963.

== Later life ==
After retiring from the political life, Carnahan returned to Ellsinore, Missouri. He continued his interest in international service as a member of the Rotary Club of Poplar Bluff. He became Rotary District World Service Chairman, and inaugurated a program to aid in the education of children in Sierra Leone. Albert Carnahan died at the Mayo Clinic in Rochester, Minnesota on March 24, 1968. He was buried at Carson Hill Cemetery in Ellsinore.

== Legacy ==
A.S.J. Carnahan was the first of three generations of the family to be elected to public office. The Carnahans have become one of the best known and most enduring families in Missouri politics. He was the father of Mel Carnahan, who went on to become the Governor of Missouri from 1993 to 2000. His daughter-in-law, Jean Carnahan, was appointed a United States senator in 2001 following the death of her husband Mel, just before his election to that body. His grandson Russ Carnahan served in the U.S. House of Representatives from 2005 to 2013, and his granddaughter Robin Carnahan was the Missouri Secretary of State from 2005 to 2013.

Carnahan Hall on the campus of Southeast Missouri State University, which houses the classes and offices of the Department of Political Science, was rededicated to him in 2004.

== External sources ==
- Congressional biography
- Legislative Profile

U.S. House of Representatives
Preceded by William P. Elmer	Member of the U.S. House of Representatives from Missouri's 8th congressional district January 3, 1945 – January 3, 1947	Succeeded by Parke M. Banta
Preceded by Parke M. Banta	Member of the U.S. House of Representatives from Missouri's 8th congressional district January 3, 1949 – January 3, 1961	Succeeded by Richard Howard Ichord Jr.
Diplomatic posts
Preceded by Herbert Reiner (Interim Chargé d'Affaires)	United States Ambassador to Sierra Leone; 1961–1963	Succeeded by Andrew V. Corry
