= Hazel Creek (Courtois Creek tributary) =

Stream in the American state of Missouri

Location
- Country: United States
- State: Missouri
- Region: Washington County, Missouri

Physical characteristics
- Source
  - location: Washington County
  - coordinates: 37°50′15″N 90°54′00″W
- Mouth: Courtois Creek
  - location: Washington County
  - coordinates: 37°52′21″N 91°03′40″W
  - elevation: 248 m (814 ft)

Hazel Creek is a stream in southwest Washington County in the U.S. state of Missouri. It is a tributary of Courtois Creek. Hazel Creek lies within the Mark Twain National Forest and the community of Palmer and the Hazel Creek Recreation Area are within the stream valley.

Hazel Creek most likely was named on account of hazel trees near its course.

== See also ==
- List of rivers of Missouri
