= Courtois Hills =

Region of the Ozark Mountains, Missouri, U.S.

- Location within Missouri

Highest point
- Elevation: 1,001 ft (305 m)
- Coordinates: 37°15′36″N 91°04′48″W

Geography
- Country: United States
- State: Missouri

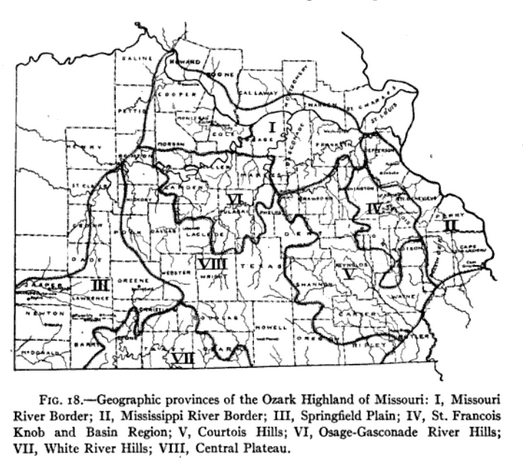
Sub-regions of Ozark Higlands in Missouri

The Courtois Hills region is an area of the Ozark Mountains in southeast Missouri. It is one of several mountainous regions that surround the Ozarks' Salem (or Central) Plateau.

== Geography ==
Although it does not contain the highest peak, the Courtois Hills has most rugged terrain and steepest average slopes of any region of the Missouri Ozarks. It, and the community Courtois, are named after Courtois Creek (pronounced "Cote-o-way" or "Curt-o-way"), one of many waterways flowing through a narrow and steep-sided valley separated by sharp ridges. The region was named after this Crawford County creek because it was one of the earliest settled valleys.

The area contains significant outcropping of limestone, ridges of chert. It also contains several springs including Greer Spring, Round Spring and Alley Spring near Eminence and Big Spring near Van Buren. Other common landforms are caves, sinkholes, and solution caves such as the Sinks natural tunnel on Current River tributary Sinking Creek.

== Economy ==
Settlement was delayed by the difficult terrain. The western frontier of the United States had crossed the Mississippi River and reached the edges of the Courtois Hills by 1811. Settlers moved in to areas to the east, north, and west of the Central Plateau and its surrounding hills first. The plateau received very slow and gradual immigration later, with settlement of the Courtois Hills occurring last.

Timber was once the largest contributor to the region's economy. From the late 1880s until almost 1920, the Missouri Lumber and Mining Company and several other large lumber companies operated in the region, extracting millions of board feet of lumber from forests of short-leaf Southern yellow pine. The region's narrow ridges are often covered with oak.

More recently, lead and zinc have been discovered and profitably mined. The terrain limits agriculture, as well as settlement, primarily to the valley floors. The best areas for agriculture are concentrated in the southern part of the region, where rivers have made the valleys wider. The Castor, St. Francis, Black, and Current Rivers are such valleys. The numerous springs also provide an abundant source of water.

== See also ==
- Geography of Missouri
