= Andrew S. Cuthbertson =

American politician

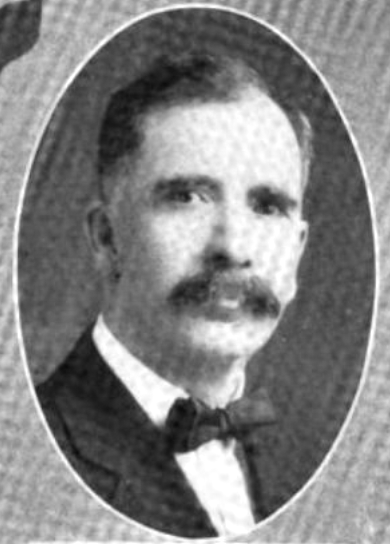

Member of the Illinois Senate
- In office 1920–1932

Personal details
- Born: Andrew Stuart Cuthbertson; January 14, 1873 Ironton, Missouri
- Died: February 1, 1933 (aged 60) Bunker Hill, Illinois
- Party: Republican
- Occupation: Lawyer, politician

Andrew Stuart Cuthbertson (January 14, 1873 – February 1, 1933) was an American politician and lawyer.

== Biography ==
Cuthbertson was born in Ironton, Missouri. He moved with his parents to Bunker Hill, Illinois in 1873. He went to the public schools and to Bunker Hill Academy. He studied law and was admitted to the Illinois bar in 1897. He was also involved in the banking business. Cuthbertson served on the Bunker Hill Board of Education and was president of the board of education. He also served as a trustee of Shurtleff College. He was involved with the Republican Party. Cuthbertson served in the Illinois Senate from 1921 to 1933. Cuthbertson died from cancer at his home in Bunker Hill, Illinois.
