= Courtois, Missouri =

- Unincorporated community
- Location of Courtois, Missouri Courtois, Missouri (the United States)
- Coordinates: 37°45′53″N 91°04′19″W
- Country: United States
- State: Missouri
- County: Washington County
- Elevation: 899 ft (274 m)
- Time zone: UTC-6 (CST)
  - Summer (DST): UTC-5 (CDT)

Courtois is an unincorporated community in southwestern Washington County, Missouri, United States, within the Courtois Hills region. It is located approximately 12 miles (19 km) southwest of Belgrade and 3.9 mi (6.3 km) northeast of Viburnum, Missouri in Iron County. Courtois is located on Missouri Route C and at the confluence of Indian Creek and Courtois Creek.

The community is named after an unidentified settler, as is a nearby stream, Courtois Creek. According to Ramsay, "The name of the creek is locally pronounced and sometimes written as Coataway or Cotoway." The name of the town is locally pronounced "Cur-toys".

A post office was established in 1886, but is now closed and mail is now transported from Steelville or Belgrade.
