= Ghermanville, Missouri =

Unincorporated community in Missouri, U.S.

- Unincorporated community
- Location within Missouri
- Coordinates: 37°38′56″N 90°40′12″W
- Country: United States
- State: Missouri
- County: Iron
- Elevation: 1,191 ft (363 m)
- Time zone: UTC-6 (Central (CST))
  - Summer (DST): UTC-5 (CDT)
- Area code: 573
- GNIS feature ID: 736626

Ghermanville is an unincorporated community in northeastern Iron County, in the U.S. state of Missouri, approximately one-half mile east of Graniteville adjacent to Missouri Route 21.

== History ==
A post office called Ghermanville was established in 1889, and remained in operation until 1894. The community was named after a local merchant.
