= Annapolis, Missouri =

City in Iron County, Missouri, United States

- City
- Location of Annapolis, Missouri
- Coordinates: 37°21′38″N 90°41′51″W
- Country: United States
- State: Missouri
- County: Iron

Area
  - Total: 0.39 sq mi (1.00 km^{2})
  - Land: 0.37 sq mi (0.97 km^{2})
  - Water: 0.012 sq mi (0.03 km^{2})
- Elevation: 650 ft (200 m)

Population (2020)
  - Total: 250
  - Density: 668.9/sq mi (258.27/km^{2})
- Time zone: UTC-6 (Central (CST))
  - Summer (DST): UTC-5 (CDT)
- ZIP code: 63620
- Area code: 573
- FIPS code: 29-01270
- GNIS feature ID: 2393963
- Website: www.annapolismo.com

Annapolis is a city in southern Iron County, Missouri, United States. The population was 250 at the 2020 census.

== History ==
Annapolis was laid out in 1871, and according to tradition, named after Anna Allen, the wife of a railroad official. The name is also said to be a transfer from Annapolis, Maryland. A post office called Annapolis has been in operation since 1871.

Annapolis was 90 percent destroyed by the Great Tri-State Tornado of 1925.

== Geography ==
Annapolis is located at the intersection of Missouri routes 49 and K between Sabula three miles to he north and Vulcan three and a half miles to the southeast. Big Creek flows past the west side of the community.

According to the United States Census Bureau, the city has a total area of 0.37 square miles (0.96 km^{2}), of which 0.36 square miles (0.93 km^{2}) is land and 0.01 square miles (0.03 km^{2}) is water.

== Demographics ==
Historical population
Census	Pop.	Note	%±
1880	153		—
1890	690		351.0%
1900	195		−71.7%
1910	160		−17.9%
1920	176		10.0%
1930	344		95.5%
1940	390		13.4%
1950	490		25.6%
1960	334		−31.8%
1970	330		−1.2%
1980	370		12.1%
1990	363		−1.9%
2000	310		−14.6%
2010	345		11.3%
2020	250		−27.5%
U.S. Decennial Census

=== 2010 census ===
As of the census of 2010, there were 345 people, 155 households, and 85 families living in the city. The population density was 958.3 inhabitants per square mile (370.0/km^{2}). There were 171 housing units at an average density of 475.0 per square mile (183.4/km^{2}). The racial makeup of the city was 99.13% White, 0.29% Native American, 0.29% from other races, and 0.29% from two or more races. Hispanic or Latino of any race were 0.87% of the population.

There were 155 households, of which 30.3% had children under the age of 18 living with them, 34.8% were married couples living together, 14.2% had a female householder with no husband present, 5.8% had a male householder with no wife present, and 45.2% were non-families. 40.0% of all households were made up of individuals, and 13.6% had someone living alone who was 65 years of age or older. The average household size was 2.15 and the average family size was 2.88.

The median age in the city was 40.2 years. 24.9% of residents were under the age of 18; 8.4% were between the ages of 18 and 24; 23.4% were from 25 to 44; 24.3% were from 45 to 64; and 18.8% were 65 years of age or older. The gender makeup of the city was 45.8% male and 54.2% female.

=== 2000 census ===
As of the census of 2000, there were 310 people, 136 households, and 84 families living in the city. The population density was 815.5 inhabitants per square mile (314.9/km^{2}). There were 161 housing units at an average density of 423.5 per square mile (163.5/km^{2}). The racial makeup of the city was 99.35% White, 0.32% Native American, and 0.32% from two or more races.

There were 136 households, out of which 29.4% had children under the age of 18 living with them, 43.4% were married couples living together, 16.2% had a female householder with no husband present, and 38.2% were non-families. 38.2% of all households were made up of individuals, and 20.6% had someone living alone who was 65 years of age or older. The average household size was 2.13 and the average family size was 2.79.

In the city the population was spread out, with 22.6% under the age of 18, 8.7% from 18 to 24, 27.4% from 25 to 44, 16.8% from 45 to 64, and 24.5% who were 65 years of age or older. The median age was 39 years. For every 100 females, there were 75.1 males. For every 100 females age 18 and over, there were 71.4 males.

The median income for a household in the city was $28,389, and the median income for a family was $24,464. Males had a median income of $25,019 versus $12,746 for females. The per capita income for the city was $10,015. About 11.2% of families and 17.4.1% of the population were below the poverty line, including 9.8% of those under age 18 and 27.0% of those age 65 or over.

== Education ==
Annapolis is home to South Iron High School, which hosts the South Iron Panthers basketball team.

Annapolis has a public library, a branch of the Ozark Regional Library.

== Arts and culture ==
Annapolis is home to an event called "Freedom Fest." The festival takes place the first Saturday of every October. "Freedom Fest" consists of a parade and a local car show and many other regular carnival events.

== See also ==
- List of cities in Missouri
