= Palmer, Missouri =

Extinct hamlet in Missouri, U.S.

Coordinates: 37°50′22″N 90°59′45″W

Palmer is an extinct town in southwestern Washington County, in the U.S. state of Missouri. The GNIS classifies it as a populated place. Palmer is located on the banks of Hazel Creek on Missouri Route Z. The area is within the Hazel Creek Recreation Area in the Mark Twain National Forest.

== History ==
Palmer was platted in 1830. Old variant names were "Harmony" and "Webster". A post office called Harmony was established in 1827, the name was changed to Palmer in 1874, and the post office closed in 1955. The present name is after Donald McNair Palmer, a businessperson in the local mining industry.
