= La Barque Creek =

Stream in Jefferson County, Missouri, U.S.

Coordinates: 38°27′15″N 90°39′24″W

La Barque Creek is a stream in Jefferson County in the U.S. state of Missouri. It is a tributary of the Meramec River.

La Barque is a name derived from the French denoting "the boat".

== See also ==
- List of rivers of Missouri
