= Redmondville, Missouri =

Unincorporated community in Missouri, U.S.

- Unincorporated community
- Location within Missouri
- Coordinates: 37°37′32″N 90°58′09″W
- Country: United States
- State: Missouri
- County: Iron
- Elevation: 899 ft (274 m)
- Time zone: UTC-6 (Central (CST))
  - Summer (DST): UTC-5 (CDT)
- Area code: 573
- GNIS feature ID: 751837

Redmondville is an unincorporated community in western Iron County, Missouri, United States. It is located on a county road approximately 0.5 miles (0.80 km) north of Missouri Route 49 in the Mark Twain National Forest. The community is on the west bank of Clayton Creek, just north of that stream's confluence with the Middle Fork of the Black River. It formerly had a school house.

A post office called Redmondville was established in 1904, and remained in operation until 1924. The community has the name of Redmond Black, an early settler.
