= Palmer Creek (Minnesota) =

Stream in Chippewa County, Minnesota, U.S.

Coordinates: 44°50′08″N 95°34′02″W

Palmer Creek is a stream in Chippewa County, Minnesota, in the United States.

Palmer Creek was named for Frank Palmer, a pioneer settler.

== See also ==
- List of rivers of Minnesota
