= Iron County Courthouse (Missouri) =

- Iron County Courthouse Buildings
- U.S. National Register of Historic Places
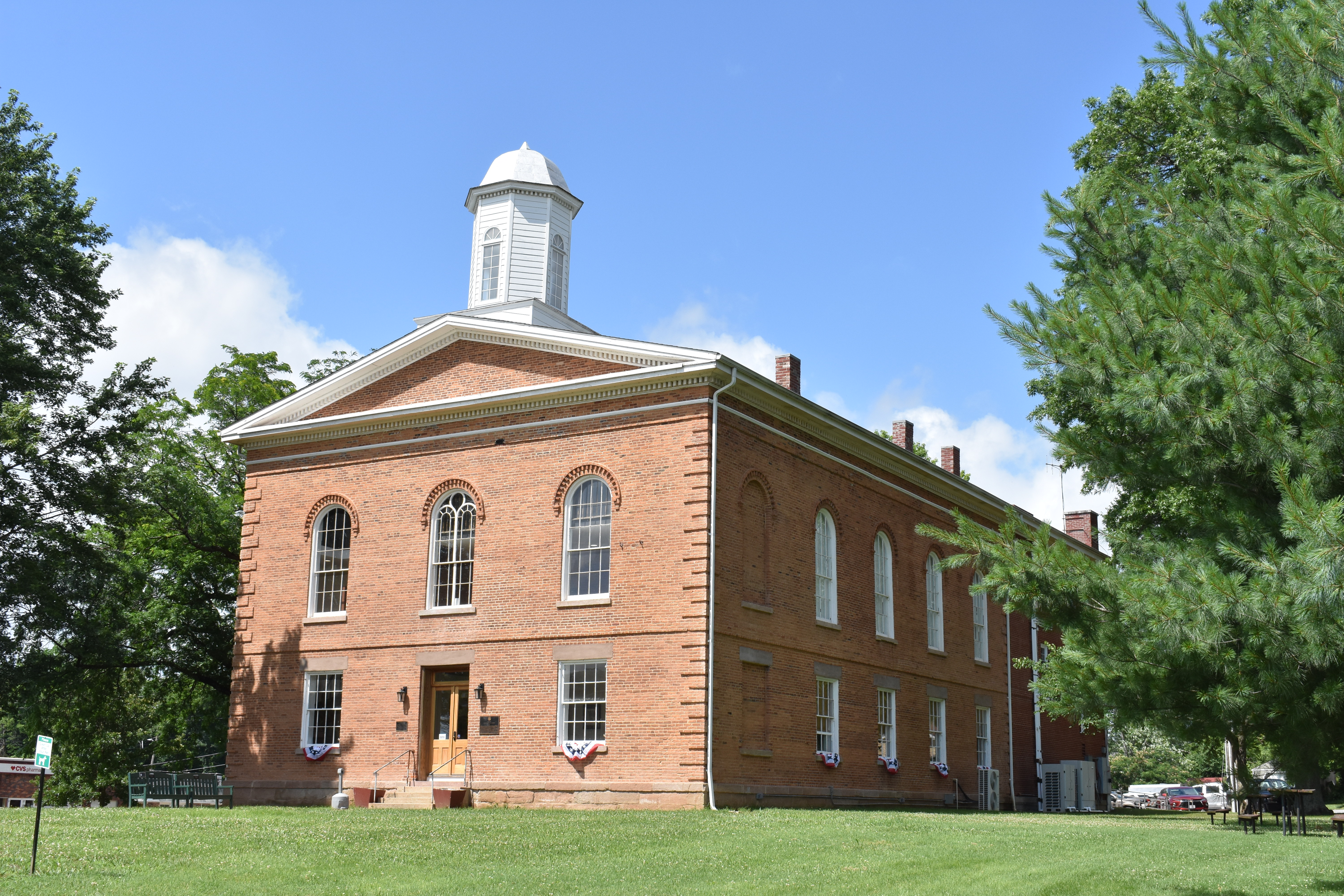
- Iron County Courthouse, June 2026

- Location within Missouri Location within the United States
- Interactive map showing the location for Iron County Courthouse
- Location: Courthouse Sq. and 220 S. Shepherd St., Ironton, Missouri
- Coordinates: 37°35′52″N 90°37′41″W
- Area: 1.7 acres (0.69 ha)
- Built: 1858, c. 1866–1867, 1899
- Architectural style: Italianate Classicism
- NRHP reference No.: 79001363
- Added to NRHP: June 27, 1979

Iron County Courthouse is a historic courthouse complex located in Ironton, Iron County, Missouri. In 1979 the courthouse, along with several associated buildings, was listed on the National Register of Historic Places. The complex consists of the two-story, red brick Italianate / Greek Revival style courthouse (1858); an octagonal, frame gazebo (1899); and two-story, brick sheriff's house and connecting stone jail (c. 1866–1867). The courthouse measure approximately 65 feet by 47 feet, 3 inches and sits on a limestone block foundation. It is topped by a gable roof with cupola and features round arched windows.
