= Palmer Creek (Applegate River tributary) =

Stream in Oregon, U.S.

Coordinates: 42°06′13″N 123°05′24″W

Palmer Creek is a stream in the U.S. state of Oregon. It is a tributary to the Applegate River.

Palmer Creek was named in honor of a local gold miner.
