= Palmer Creek (Georgia) =

- Location within Georgia Location within the United States

Physical characteristics
- Source
  - coordinates: 34.4391667°N 84.0958333°W
- Mouth
  - coordinates: 34.3839846°N 84.0618556°W

Palmer Creek is a stream in the U.S. state of Georgia. It is a tributary to the Etowah River.

Palmer Creek derives its name from Silas Palmour, a pioneer citizen of Native American (Indian) descent. A variant name is "Palmers Creek".
