= Germanville, Nebraska =

Nebraskan ghost town

Coordinates: 40.568°N 100.833°W

Germanville is a ghost town in Cuming County, Nebraska, United States.

== History ==
A post office was established at Germanville in 1898, and remained in operation until it was discontinued in 1902. A share of the early settlers being natives of Germany caused the name to be selected.
