= Graniteville, Missouri =

Unincorporated community in Missouri, U.S.

- Unincorporated community
- Location within Missouri
- Coordinates: 37°39′01″N 90°40′47″W
- Country: United States
- State: Missouri
- County: Iron
- Elevation: 1,211 ft (369 m)
- Time zone: UTC-6 (Central (CST))
  - Summer (DST): UTC-5 (CDT)
- Area code: 573
- GNIS feature ID: 718694

Graniteville is an unincorporated community in northeast Iron County, in the U.S. state of Missouri. The community is located on Missouri Route 21 approximately three-quarters of a mile east of Elephant Rocks State Park. Pilot Knob is about three miles to the southeast.

== History ==
A post office called Graniteville was established in 1874, and remained in operation until 1913. The community was named for granite quarrying near the original town site.

== Notable person ==
- Tim McCabe (1894–1977), baseball player
