= Belleview, Missouri =

- Unincorporated community
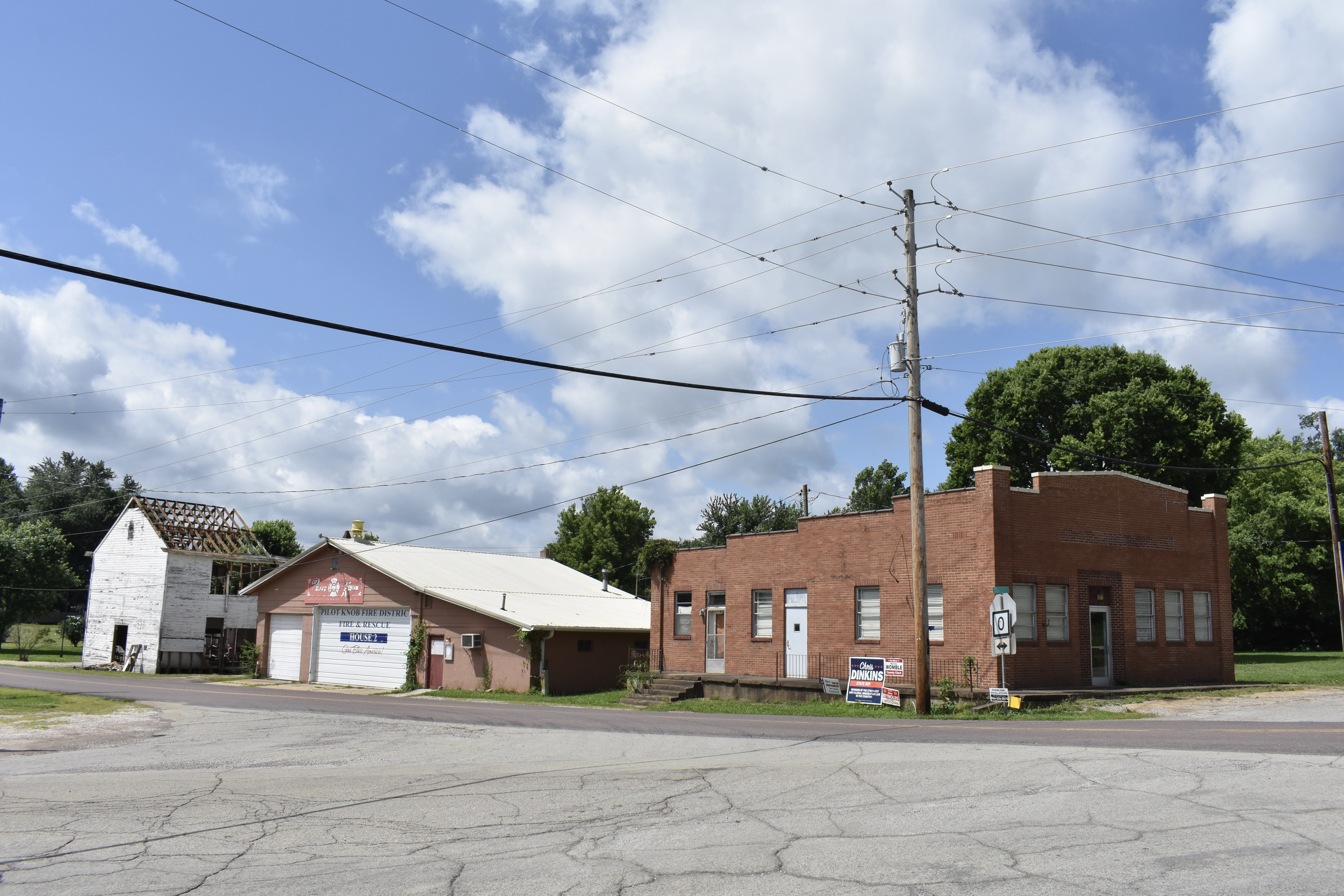
- Belleview in June 2026

- Location within Missouri Location within the United States
- Coordinates: 37°41′15″N 90°44′25″W
- Country: United States
- State: Missouri
- County: Iron
- Elevation: 1,043 ft (318 m)
- Time zone: UTC-6 (Central (CST))
  - Summer (DST): UTC-5 (CDT)
- ZIP code: 63623
- Area code: 573
- GNIS feature ID: 736276

Belleview is an unincorporated community in northern Iron County, Missouri, United States. It is located about eight miles northwest of Ironton on Route 21 and is approximately three miles south of Belgrade and Caledonia. Belleview is located near Elephant Rocks State Park and is near the Mark Twain National Forest.

A post office called Belleview has been in operation from 1860-2014. Belleview is derived from belle vue, meaning "beautiful view" in French. An old variant name was "Crossroads".
