= Glover, Missouri =

- Unincorporated community
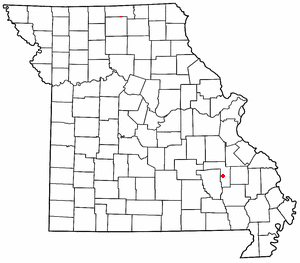
- Location of Glover within Missouri
- Coordinates: 37°29′11″N 90°41′28″W
- Country: United States
- State: Missouri
- County: Iron
- Elevation: 850 ft (260 m)
- Time zone: UTC-6 (Central (CST))
  - Summer (DST): UTC-5 (CDT)
- Area code: 573
- GNIS feature ID: 750053

Glover is an unincorporated community in southern Iron County, Missouri, United States. It is located on Route 49, approximately eight miles south of Ironton.

A post office called Glover was established in 1888, and remained in operation until 1991. The community has the name of John Milton Glover, a state legislator.

The lead smelter at Glover was operated by Doe Run Company and was a major local employer until operations were indefinitely suspended in 2003.
