= Hogan, Missouri =

- Unincorporated community
- Location within Missouri Location within the United States
- Coordinates: 37°30′40″N 90°41′45″W
- Country: United States
- State: Missouri
- County: Iron
- Elevation: 906 ft (276 m)
- Time zone: UTC-6 (Central (CST))
  - Summer (DST): UTC-5 (CDT)
- Area code: 573
- GNIS feature ID: 750360

Hogan is an unincorporated community in Iron County, in the U.S. state of Missouri.

== History ==
A post office called Hogan was established in 1880, and remained in operation until 1943. The community has the name of Joe Hogan, the proprietor of a nearby iron mine.
