= Berryman, Missouri =

Unincorporated community in Missouri, U.S.

Coordinates: 37°55′08″N 91°05′47″W

Berryman is an Unincorporated community on the border between Crawford and Washington counties in the U.S. state of Missouri. Located along Route 8, it lies in the Mark Twain National Forest, approximately sixteen miles west of Potosi. Courtois Creek flows under Route 8, just west of the village. Berryman Recreation Area and trail lie to the northeast of the village.

Berryman was originally called Osage, and under the latter name was founded in the 1830s. The present name is after John Berryman, the acquaintance of an early settler. A post office named Osage was established in 1836, the name was changed to Berryman in 1886, and the post office closed in 1986.
