= Bixby, Missouri =

Unincorporated community in the U.S. state of Missouri

- Unincorporated community
- Location within Missouri Location within the United States
- Coordinates: 37°39′37″N 91°6′54″W
- Country: United States
- State: Missouri
- County: Iron
- Elevation: 1,411 ft (430 m)

Population (2000)
  - Total: 64
- Time zone: UTC-6 (Central (CST))
  - Summer (DST): UTC-5 (CDT)
- ZIP codes: 65439
- GNIS feature ID: 748874

Bixby is an unincorporated community in western Iron County, Missouri, United States. It is located at the western intersection of Routes 32 and 49, approximately 22 miles east of Salem.

A post office called Bixby was established in 1906, and remained in operation until 1952. The community has the name of William K. Bixby, a railroad car manufacturer.
