= Meramec River =

River in the American state of Missouri

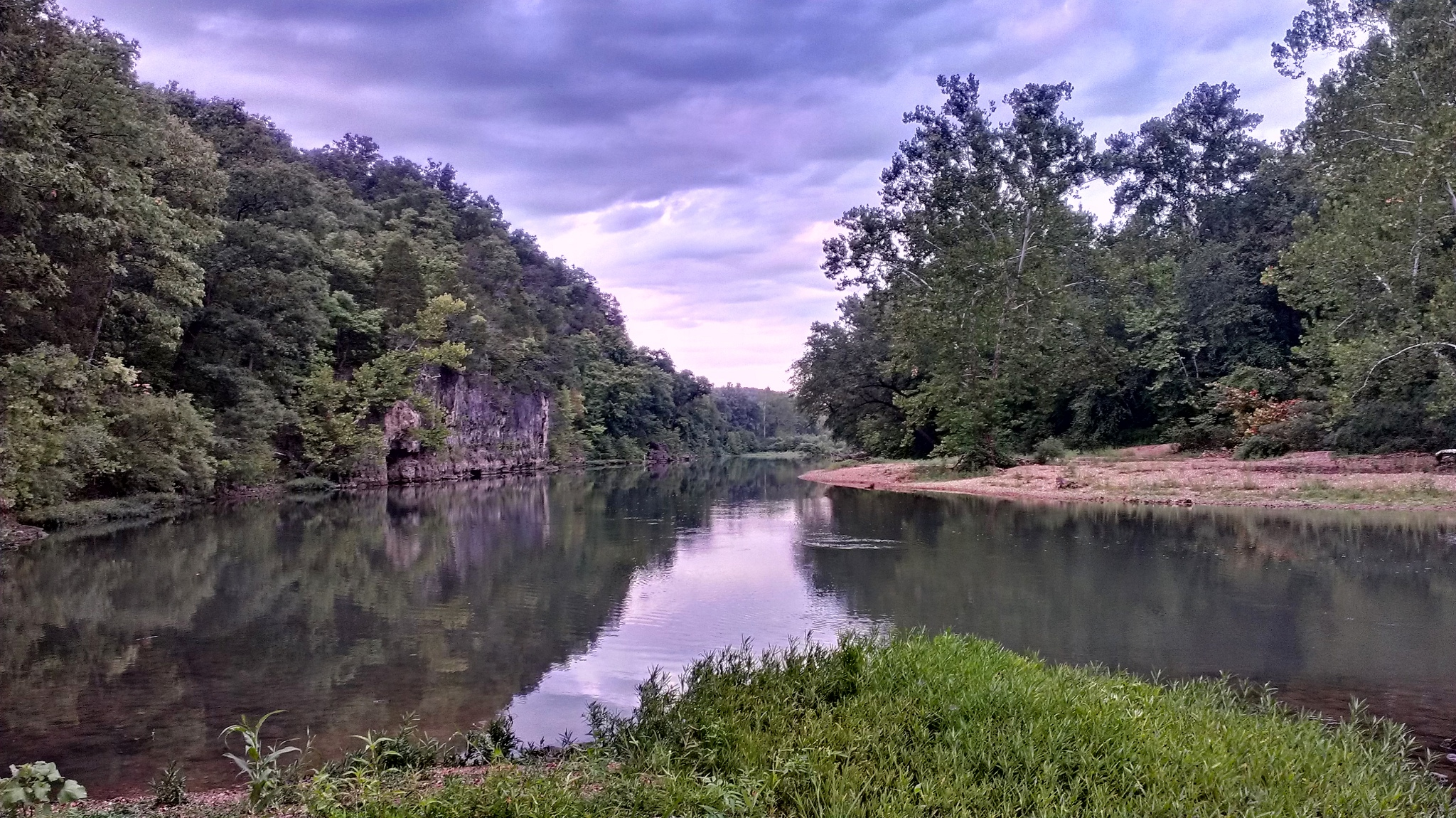
- At Onondaga Cave State Park

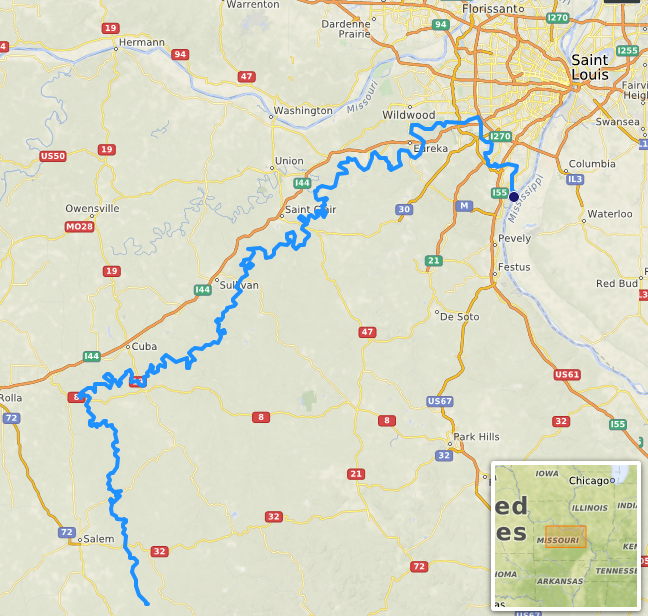
- Path of the Meramec River

Location
- Country: United States
- State: Missouri
- Region: Ozarks
- Cities: Steelville, Missouri, Sullivan, Missouri, Pacific, Missouri, Valley Park, Missouri, Arnold, Missouri

Physical characteristics
- Source
  - location: Dent County, Missouri
  - coordinates: 37°30′29″N 91°19′39″W
  - elevation: 1,075 ft (328 m)
- Mouth: Mississippi River
  - location: Arnold, Missouri
  - coordinates: 38°23′26″N 90°20′40″W
  - elevation: 350 ft (110 m)
- Length: 229 mi (369 km)
- Basin size: 3,980 sq mi (10,300 km^{2})
- Discharge
  - location: Eureka, Missouri
  - average: 3,318 cu/ft. per sec.

Basin features
- Tributaries
  - left: Bourbeuse River
  - right: Big River

The Meramec River (/ˈmɛrɪmæk/ MERR-im-ak), sometimes spelled Maramec River (the original US mapping spelled it Maramec but later changed it to Meramec), is one of the longest free-flowing waterways in the U.S. state of Missouri, draining 3,980 square miles (10,300 km^{2}) while wandering 218 miles (351 km) from headwaters southeast of Salem to where it empties into the Mississippi River near St. Louis at Arnold and Oakville. The Meramec watershed covers six Missouri Ozark Highland counties—Dent, Phelps, Crawford, Franklin, Jefferson, and St. Louis—and portions of eight others—Maries, Gasconade, Iron, Washington, Reynolds, St. Francois, Ste. Genevieve, and Texas. Between its source and its mouth, it falls 1,025 feet (312 m). Year-round navigability begins above Maramec Spring, just south of St. James. The Meramec's size increases at the confluence of the Dry Fork, and its navigability continues until the river enters the Mississippi at Arnold, Missouri.

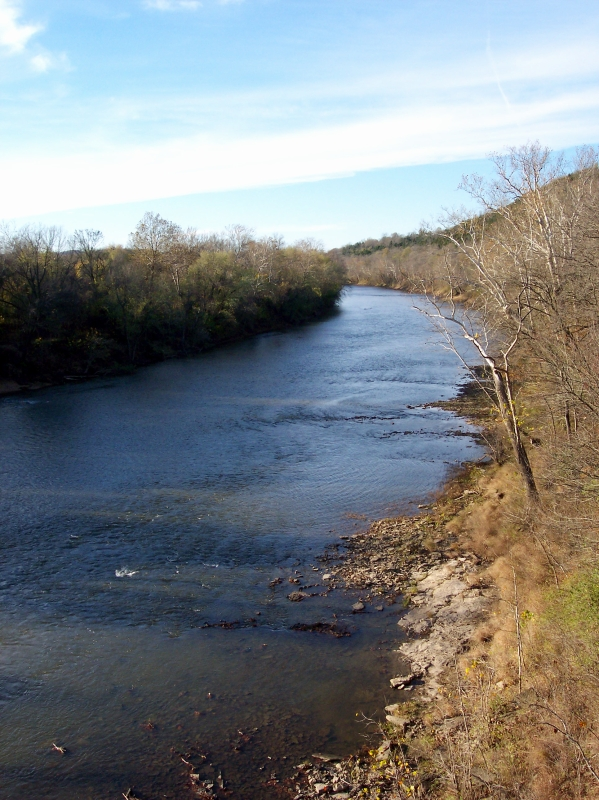
The Meramec River looking north from Route 66 State Park

== History ==
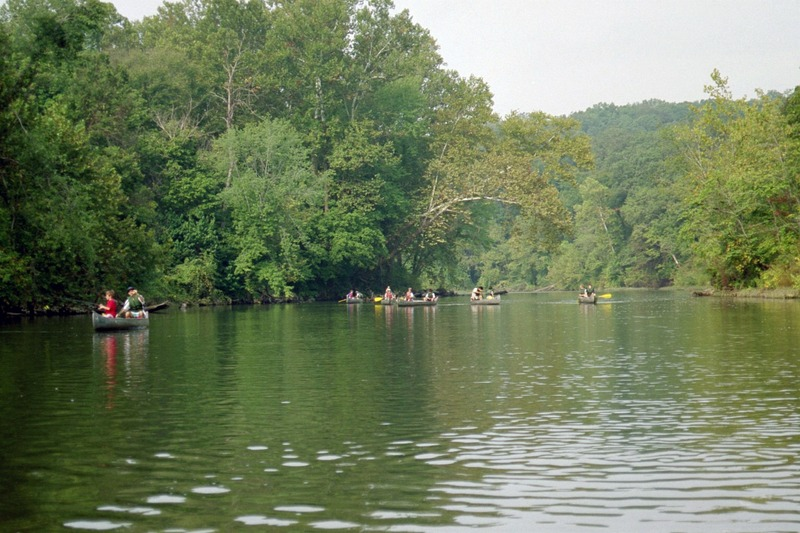
Canoers enjoy a float trip on the Meramec below Leasburg

The origin of the name is unclear, but some have asserted that it might mean 'the river of ugly fishes' or 'ugly water' in Algonquian. Early variant spellings of the name were Mearamigoua, Maramig, Mirameg, Meramecsipy, Merramec, Merrimac, Mearmeig, and Maramecquisipi. The first European explorer was French Jesuit priest Jacques Gravier, who traveled the river in 1699–1700. Early on, the river became an important industrial shipping route, with lead, iron, and timber being sent downstream by flatboat and shallow-draft steamboat.

Today, the river is used commercially by tour boats and sand and gravel mining barges. It also is used by canoe outfitters and ferry boat excursions. Numerous trails travel along the river and up over the bluffs, giving the hiker a glimpse of ducks, herons, beavers and other species of wildlife which may be seen along the river.

== Ecology ==
At one time, the river was listed as one of the most polluted rivers in Missouri. Local and state government along the river have taken steps in cleaning it up. Today the river is one of the most diverse waters in Missouri. The river is plentiful in black crappie, channel catfish, flathead catfish, largemouth bass, paddlefish, rainbow trout, brown trout, rock bass, smallmouth bass, walleye, white crappie, and some of the richest mussel beds in the state. The endangered Eastern Hellbender (Cryptobranchus alleganiensis alleganiensis) also lives in the river.

The Meramec River includes one of only three Red Ribbon Trout Areas in the state of Missouri, hosting healthy rainbow trout and brown trout populations where large springs flowing into the river provide the cool water required by these species. Red Ribbon trout streams are managed by the Missouri Department of Conservation to produce trophy-sized fish.

Maramec Spring is the fifth-largest spring in Missouri. Maramec Spring Park, south of St. James, is the home of an historic iron works and trout fishery.

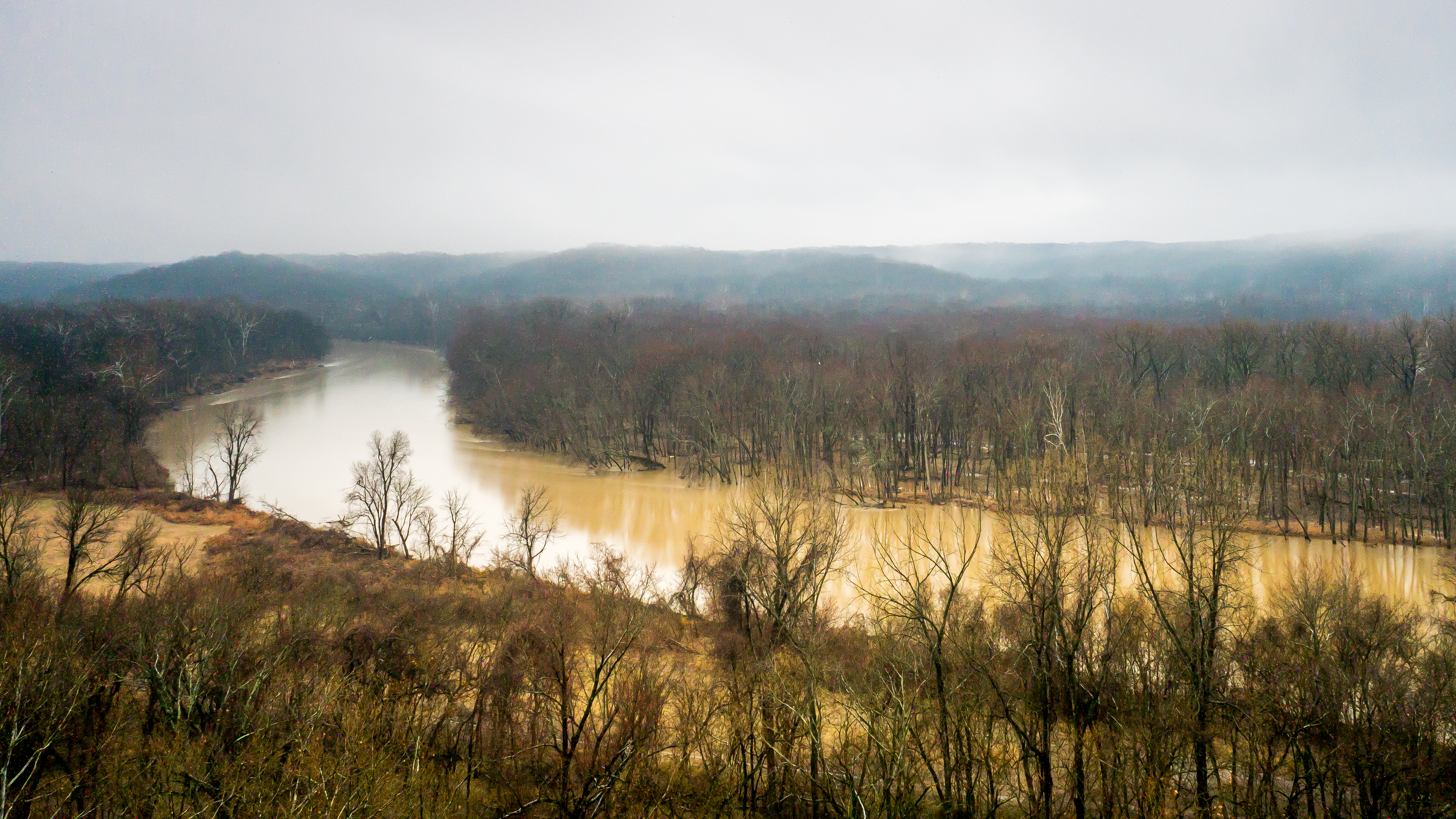
The Meramec River flowing through Castlewood State Park near St. Louis

== Flooding ==
As a free-flowing river with no flood control dams, the Meramec is subject to flooding. In addition to a flood in December 1982, there was major flooding December 2015 and in May 2017. Only the community of Valley Park, protected by a $50 million levee designed by the U.S. Army Corps of Engineers, was spared. For the first time in state history, MoDOT had to shut down I-44 from flooding in 2015.

Flood risk along the Meramec is increasing, with the communities of cities like Eureka, Pacific and Valley Park bracing for "100-year" floods twice during a 16-month period between 2015 and 2017. A St. Louis Post Dispatch headline stated that "Two catastrophic floods in less than two years wasn't just a case of bad luck," and attributed the flooding to "worrisome climate trends" and "failed flood policy that both constricts and swells waterways through levee construction and flood plain development."

=== Meramec Basin Project ===
This map shows the extent of the main reservoir that would have been created at Sullivan by the Meramec Basin Project.

The free-flowing Meramec River and several of its tributaries narrowly avoided being impounded by several dams proposed by the Corps of Engineers. The United States Congress authorized several large dams in the upper Mississippi and Meramec river basins in 1938 following severe flooding in 1927 and 1937. World War II intervened, and plans were delayed and altered, but the Meramec Basin Project finally started moving forward in the 1960s. The main dam was to be at Sullivan, Missouri, at Meramec State Park, with several additional dams upstream. These plans ran into opposition from the growing environmental movement of the 1960s and 1970s, as well as from recreational users of the free-flowing Meramec. The failure of the Teton Dam in 1976 increased the public's doubt about the wisdom of the project.

Grass-roots opposition forced politicians originally in favor of the project to reconsider. At the request of Senators Jack Danforth and Tom Eagleton, Missouri Governor Kit Bond allowed a non-binding referendum to be put on ballots in twelve surrounding counties. On August 8, 1978, 64 percent of the voters rejected the dam proposal. The referendum carried no legal weight but caused Congress to reconsider. Under President Jimmy Carter, funding was removed from the project. In 1981, President Ronald Reagan signed the bill de-authorizing the project. This was one of the first times that a Corps of Engineers project was stopped once construction had begun, and it marked a major victory for the American environmental movement.

== See also ==
- List of Missouri rivers
- Tributaries: Big River, Bourbeuse River, Courtois Creek, La Barque Creek
- Times Beach, Missouri (contaminated ghost town)
