= Huzzah Creek (Meramec River tributary) =

Stream in Missouri, United States

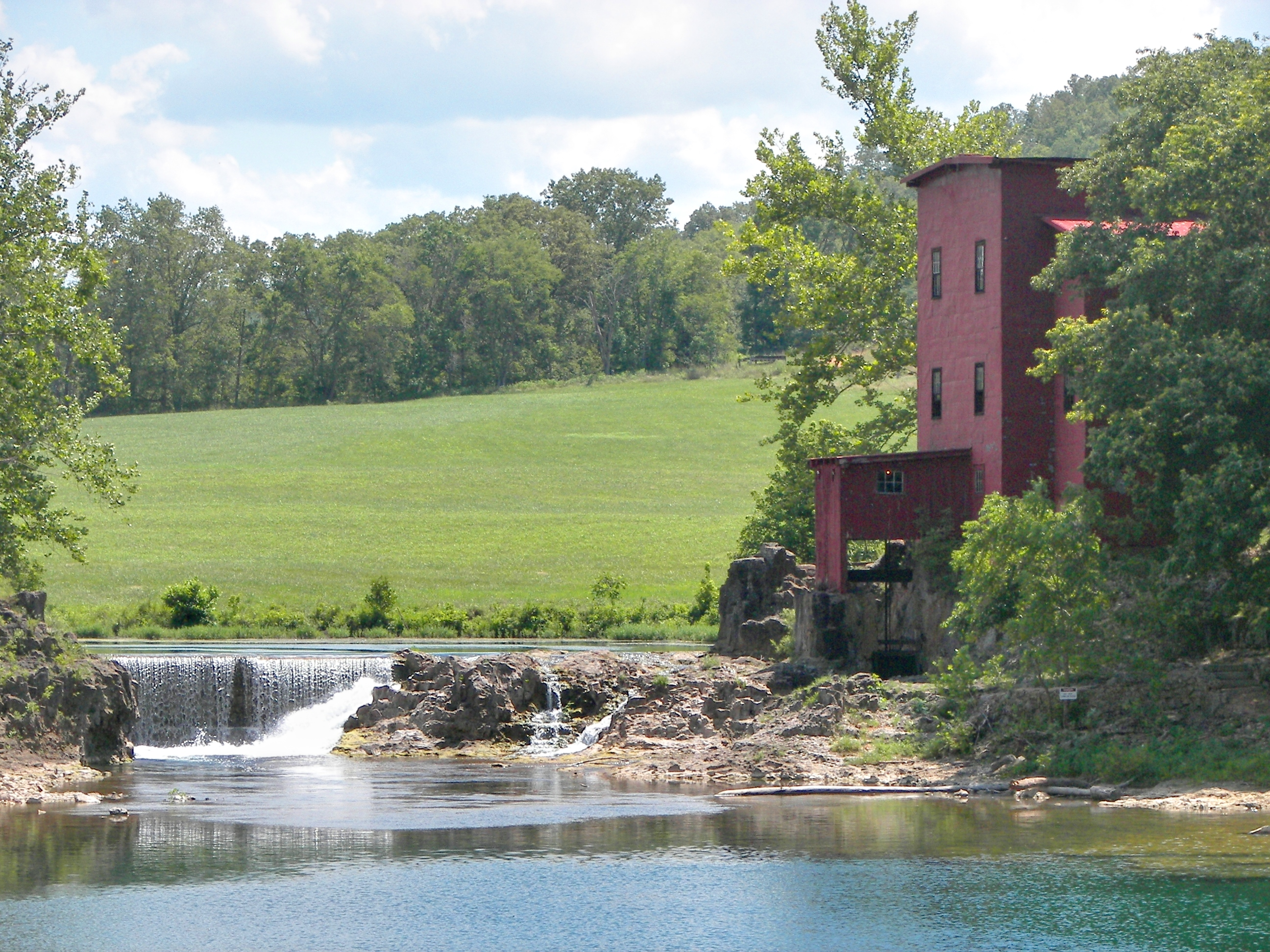
- Dillard Mill on the Huzzah

Location
- Country: United States

Physical characteristics
- Source: West Fork
  - coordinates: 37°34′54″N 91°14′38″W
- 2nd source: East Fork
  - coordinates: 37°34′26″N 91°10′26″W
- Mouth: Meramec River
  - location: About a mile upstream of Onondaga Cave State Park
  - coordinates: 38°01′52″N 91°13′39″W
- Length: 35.8 mi (57.6 km)
- Basin size: 266 mi^{2} (690 km^{2})
- Discharge
  - average: 310 cu ft/s (8.8 m^{3}/s)

Huzzah Creek (/ˈhuːzɑː/ HOO-zah) is a 35.8-mile-long (57.6 km) clear-flowing stream in the southern part of the U.S. state of Missouri. According to the information in the Ramsay Place Names File at the University of Missouri, the creek's name "is evidently derived from" Huzzaus, one of the early French versions of the name of the Osage people.

The Huzzah's headwaters are in the Mark Twain National Forest in northern Reynolds County. It flows northward through the Missouri Ozarks, roughly paralleling the course of Courtois Creek to its east, until it enters the Meramec River shortly after passing under the Crawford County Highway E bridge. Along its course it flows through the Dillard Mill State Historic Site and, near its confluence with the Meramec, the 6,225-acre (2,519 ha) Huzzah Conservation Area.

The creek is popular for camping, canoeing, kayaking, and rafting. It is surrounded by limestone bluffs and stands of native pine, oak, and hickory trees; and at normal water levels it has no sections of difficulty greater than grades I and II. The St. Louis Riverfront Times cited the creek as the "Best River for Float Trips" in 2011.
