= Viburnum, Missouri =

- City
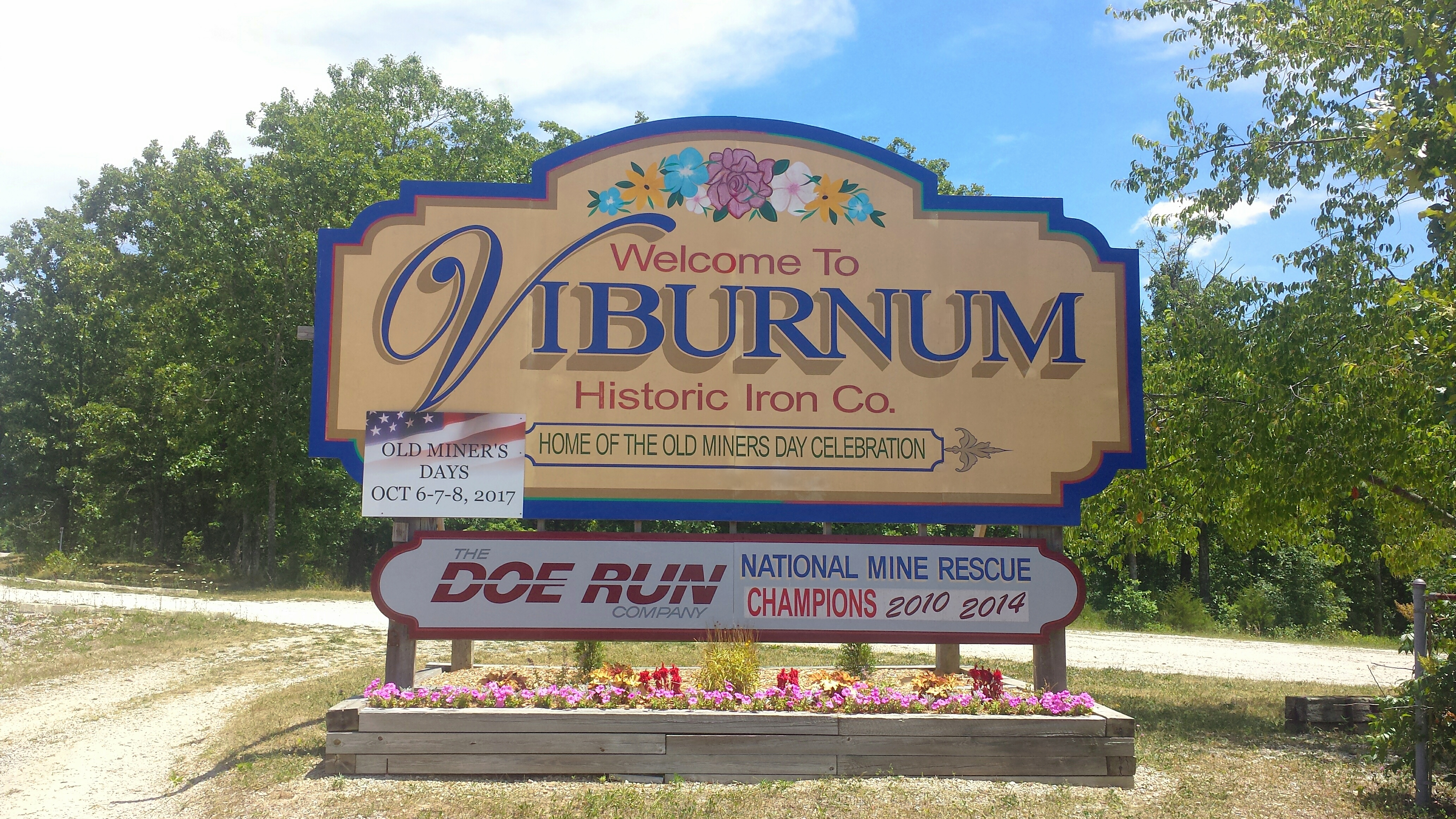
- Viburnum Missouri welcome sign

- Location of Viburnum, Missouri
- Coordinates: 37°42′54″N 91°07′46″W
- Country: United States
- State: Missouri
- County: Iron

Area
  - Total: 1.73 sq mi (4.47 km^{2})
  - Land: 1.72 sq mi (4.45 km^{2})
  - Water: 0.012 sq mi (0.03 km^{2})
- Elevation: 1,253 ft (382 m)

Population (2020)
  - Total: 667
  - Density: 388.5/sq mi (150.01/km^{2})
- Time zone: UTC-6 (Central (CST))
  - Summer (DST): UTC-5 (CDT)
- ZIP code: 65566
- Area code: 573
- FIPS code: 29-76012
- GNIS feature ID: 2397133
- Website: www.viburnum.net

Viburnum (/vaɪˈbɜːrnəm/ vy-BUR-nəm) is a city in Iron County, Missouri, United States. The population was 667 at the 2020 census. The city is located in the New Lead Belt.

== History ==
A post office called Viburnum was established in 1907, and remained in operation until 1955. The city was named for the genus Viburnum, commonly known as the black haw and arrowwood.

== Geography ==
Viburnum is four miles north of Bixby and 20 miles west of Belgrade.

According to the United States Census Bureau, the city has a total area of 1.73 square miles (4.48 km^{2}), of which 1.72 square miles (4.45 km^{2}) is land and 0.01 square miles (0.03 km^{2}) is water.

== Demographics ==
Historical population
Census	Pop.	Note	%±
1960	590		—
1970	520		−11.9%
1980	836		60.8%
1990	743		−11.1%
2000	825		11.0%
2010	693		−16.0%
2020	667		−3.8%
U.S. Decennial Census

=== 2010 census ===
As of the census of 2010, there were 693 people, 278 households, and 199 families living in the city. The population density was 402.9 inhabitants per square mile (155.6/km^{2}). There were 328 housing units at an average density of 190.7 per square mile (73.6/km^{2}). The racial makeup of the city was 98.12% White, 0.43% Black or African American, 0.58% Native American, 0.14% from other races, and 0.72% from two or more races. Hispanic or Latino of any race were 1.15% of the population.

There were 278 households, of which 34.2% had children under the age of 18 living with them, 53.6% were married couples living together, 12.9% had a female householder with no husband present, 5.0% had a male householder with no wife present, and 28.4% were non-families. 24.8% of all households were made up of individuals, and 12.3% had someone living alone who was 65 years of age or older. The average household size was 2.41 and the average family size was 2.85.

The median age in the city was 39 years. 25.5% of residents were under the age of 18; 8.3% were between the ages of 18 and 24; 24.3% were from 25 to 44; 24.2% were from 45 to 64; and 17.6% were 65 years of age or older. The gender makeup of the city was 48.9% male and 51.1% female.

=== 2000 census ===
As of the census of 2000, there were 825 people, 302 households, and 224 families living in the city. The population density was 479.0 inhabitants per square mile (184.9/km^{2}). There were 325 housing units at an average density of 188.7 per square mile (72.9/km^{2}). The racial makeup of the city was 98.91% White, 0.12% African American, 0.48% Native American, and 0.48% from two or more races. Hispanic or Latino of any race were 0.36% of the population.

There were 302 households, out of which 36.8% had children under the age of 18 living with them, 62.9% were married couples living together, 9.3% had a female householder with no husband present, and 25.5% were non-families. 22.2% of all households were made up of individuals, and 8.3% had someone living alone who was 65 years of age or older. The average household size was 2.60 and the average family size was 3.03.

In the city the population was spread out, with 28.7% under the age of 18, 6.7% from 18 to 24, 25.2% from 25 to 44, 21.9% from 45 to 64, and 17.5% who were 65 years of age or older. The median age was 37 years. For every 100 females, there were 89.2 males. For every 100 females age 18 and over, there were 82.6 males.

The median income for a household in the city was $34,107, and the median income for a family was $38,750. Males had a median income of $40,909 versus $18,250 for females. The per capita income for the city was $15,085. About 11.3% of families and 13.6% of the population were below the poverty line, including 13.4% of those under age 18 and 21.4% of those age 65 or over.

== Education ==
Viburnum has a public library, a branch of the Ozark Regional Library.
