= Big Creek (St. Francis River tributary) =

Stream in Wayne and Iron counties in Missouri, United States

Big Creek is a stream in Iron and Wayne counties in Missouri, United States, that is a tributary of the St. Francis River. The stream headwaters are at 37°33′45″N 90°40′34″W in Iron County and the confluence with the St. Francis is at 37°14′09″N 90°30′25″W in northern Wayne County.

Big Creek was so named on account of its relatively large size.

== See also ==
- List of rivers of Missouri
