= Ironton, Missouri =

City in Missouri, U.S.

- City
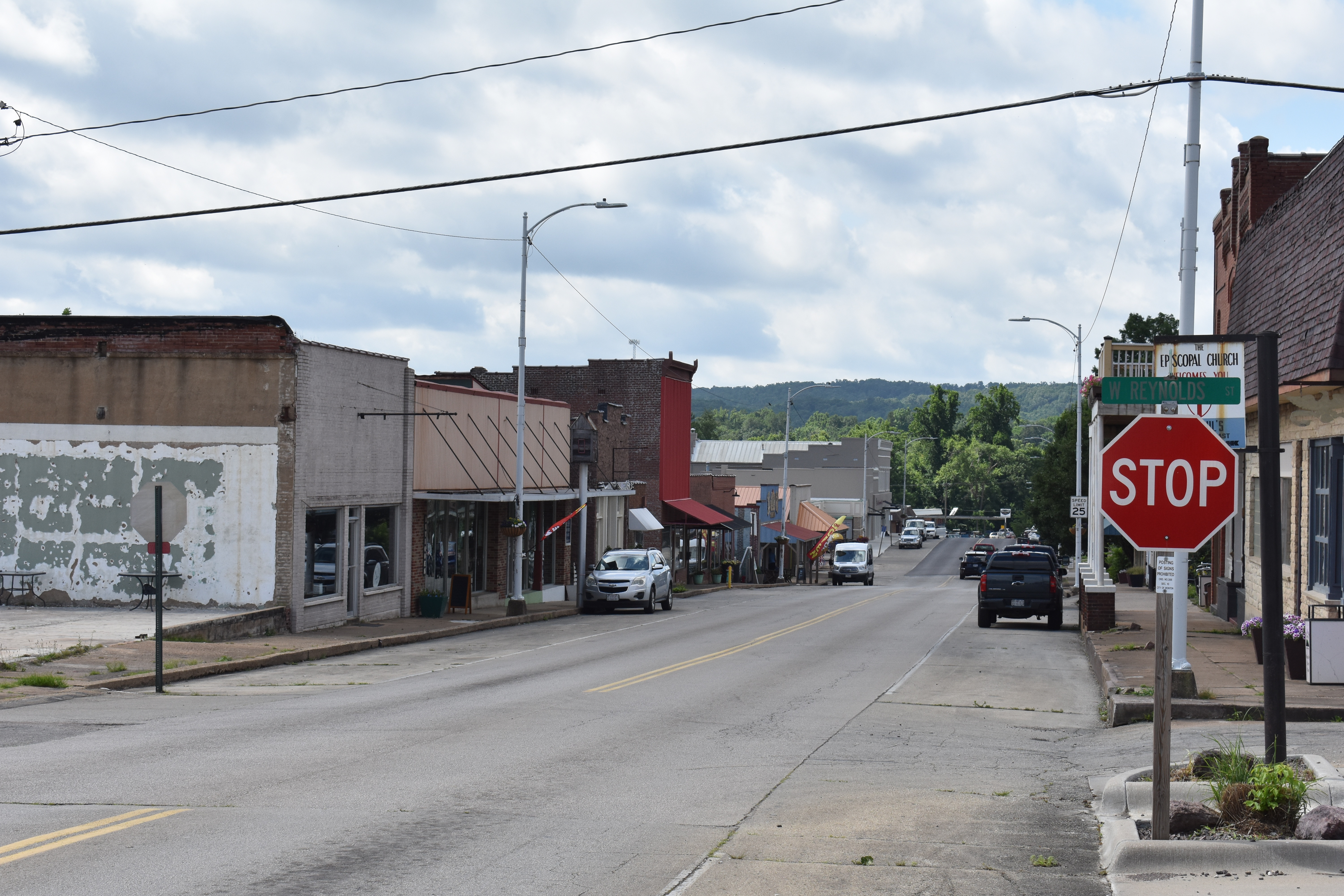
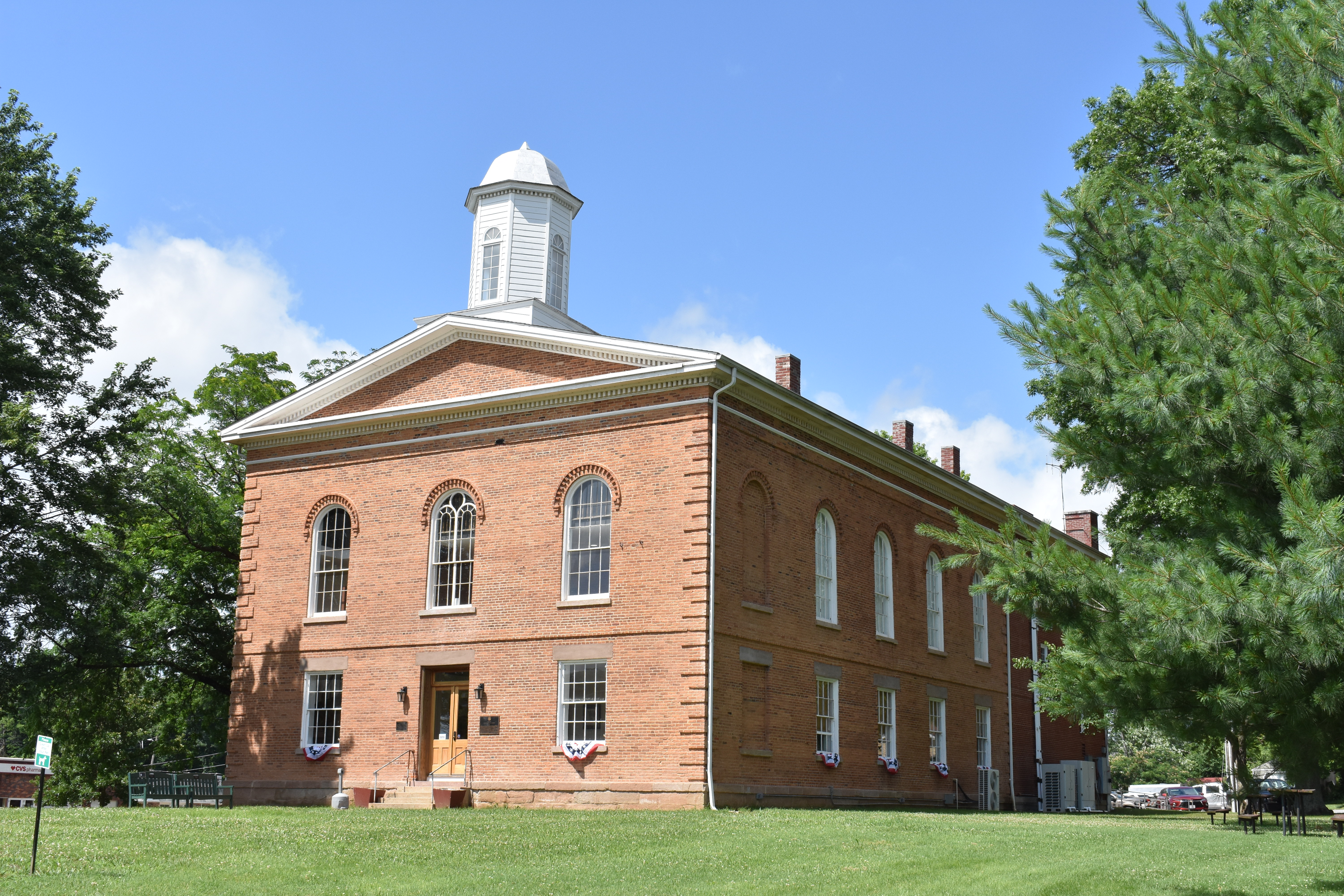
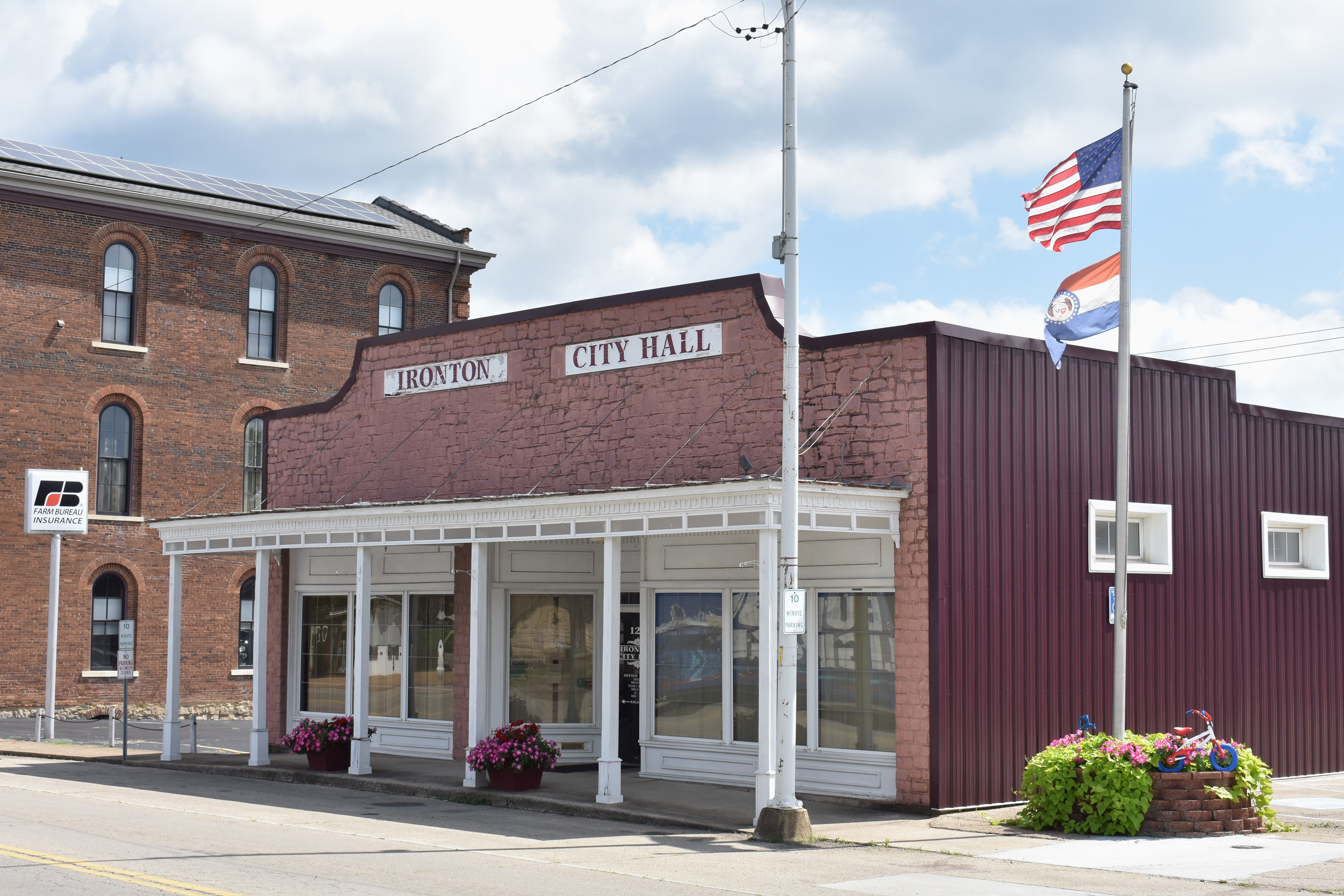
- Downtown Iron County Courthouse City Hall
- Nickname: Queen City of the Francois Mountains
- Location of Ironton, Missouri
- Coordinates: 37°36′03″N 90°37′40″W
- Country: United States
- State: Missouri
- County: Iron

Area
  - Total: 1.39 sq mi (3.60 km^{2})
  - Land: 1.34 sq mi (3.48 km^{2})
  - Water: 0.046 sq mi (0.12 km^{2})
- Elevation: 938 ft (286 m)

Population (2020)
  - Total: 1,475
  - Density: 1,098.3/sq mi (424.04/km^{2})
- Time zone: UTC-6 (Central (CST))
  - Summer (DST): UTC-5 (CDT)
- ZIP code: 63650
- Area code: 573
- FIPS code: 29-35468
- GNIS feature ID: 2395440
- Website: City website

Ironton is a city in and the county seat of Iron County, Missouri, United States. The population was 1,475 at the 2020 census.

== History ==
Ironton was designated county seat in 1857, soon after the formation of Iron County. Like the county, Ironton was named from the deposits of iron ore found in the vicinity. A post office called Ironton has been in operation since 1858.

In early August 1861, Brigader General Ulysses S. Grant led a force of four regiments in the area. In a letter to his wife he described the area as “one of the most delightful places I have ever been in.”

== Geography ==
According to the United States Census Bureau, the city has a total area of 1.39 square miles (3.60 km^{2}), of which 1.34 square miles (3.47 km^{2}) is land and 0.05 square miles (0.13 km^{2}) is water.

== Demographics ==
Historical population
Census	Pop.	Note	%±
1860	386		—
1870	573		48.4%
1880	759		32.5%
1890	965		27.1%
1900	797		−17.4%
1910	721		−9.5%
1920	832		15.4%
1930	974		17.1%
1940	1,083		11.2%
1950	1,148		6.0%
1960	1,310		14.1%
1970	1,452		10.8%
1980	1,743		20.0%
1990	1,539		−11.7%
2000	1,471		−4.4%
2010	1,460		−0.7%
2020	1,475		1.0%
U.S. Decennial Census 2020

=== 2010 census ===
As of the census of 2010, there were 1,460 people, 639 households, and 375 families living in the city. The population density was 1,089.6 inhabitants per square mile (420.7/km^{2}). There were 745 housing units at an average density of 556.0 per square mile (214.7/km^{2}). The racial makeup of the city was 96.16% White, 1.71% Black or African American, 0.34% Native American, 0.07% Asian, 0.14% from other races, and 1.58% from two or more races. Hispanic or Latino of any race were 1.51% of the population.

There were 639 households, of which 25.7% had children under the age of 18 living with them, 41.2% were married couples living together, 13.9% had a female householder with no husband present, 3.6% had a male householder with no wife present, and 41.3% were non-families. 37.4% of all households were made up of individuals, and 16.1% had someone living alone who was 65 years of age or older. The average household size was 2.21 and the average family size was 2.88.

The median age in the city was 41.9 years. 20.1% of residents were under the age of 18; 9.8% were between the ages of 18 and 24; 23.1% were from 25 to 44; 26.6% were from 45 to 64; and 20.2% were 65 years of age or older. The gender makeup of the city was 47.2% male and 52.8% female.

=== 2000 census ===
As of the census of 2000, there were 1,471 people, 615 households, and 389 families living in the city. The population density was 1,083.2 inhabitants per square mile (418.2/km^{2}). There were 683 housing units at an average density of 502.9 per square mile (194.2/km^{2}). The racial makeup of the city was 94.97% White, 3.06% African American, 0.41% Native American, 0.20% Asian, 0.20% from other races, and 1.16% from two or more races. Hispanic or Latino of any race were 0.61% of the population.

There were 615 households, out of which 29.8% had children under the age of 18 living with them, 47.2% were married couples living together, 13.7% had a female householder with no husband present, and 36.7% were non-families. 31.9% of all households were made up of individuals, and 17.2% had someone living alone who was 65 years of age or older. The average household size was 2.30 and the average family size was 2.88.

In the city, the population was spread out, with 23.9% under the age of 18, 8.0% from 18 to 24, 24.9% from 25 to 44, 24.9% from 45 to 64, and 18.3% who were 65 years of age or older. The median age was 41 years. For every 100 females, there were 86.9 males. For every 100 females age 18 and over, there were 83.3 males.

The median income for a household in the city was $23,808, and the median income for a family was $31,458. Males had a median income of $28,800 versus $18,162 for females. The per capita income for the city was $14,710. About 17.4% of families and 22.9% of the population were below the poverty line, including 31.1% of those under age 18 and 18.9% of those age 65 or over.

== Education ==
Ironton students are served by the Arcadia Valley School District. Arcadia Valley High School is a small, rural school.

Ironton has a public library, a branch of the Ozark Regional Library.

== Notable people ==
- Chris Carr, former NBA basketball player
- Andrew S. Cuthbertson, Illinois state senator and lawyer
- John Wesley Emerson, American lawyer and businessperson
- Jeff Tesreau, American League pitcher, Major League Baseball, 1912–1917

== See also ==
- List of cities in Missouri
