= Iron County, Missouri =

County in Missouri, United States

- County
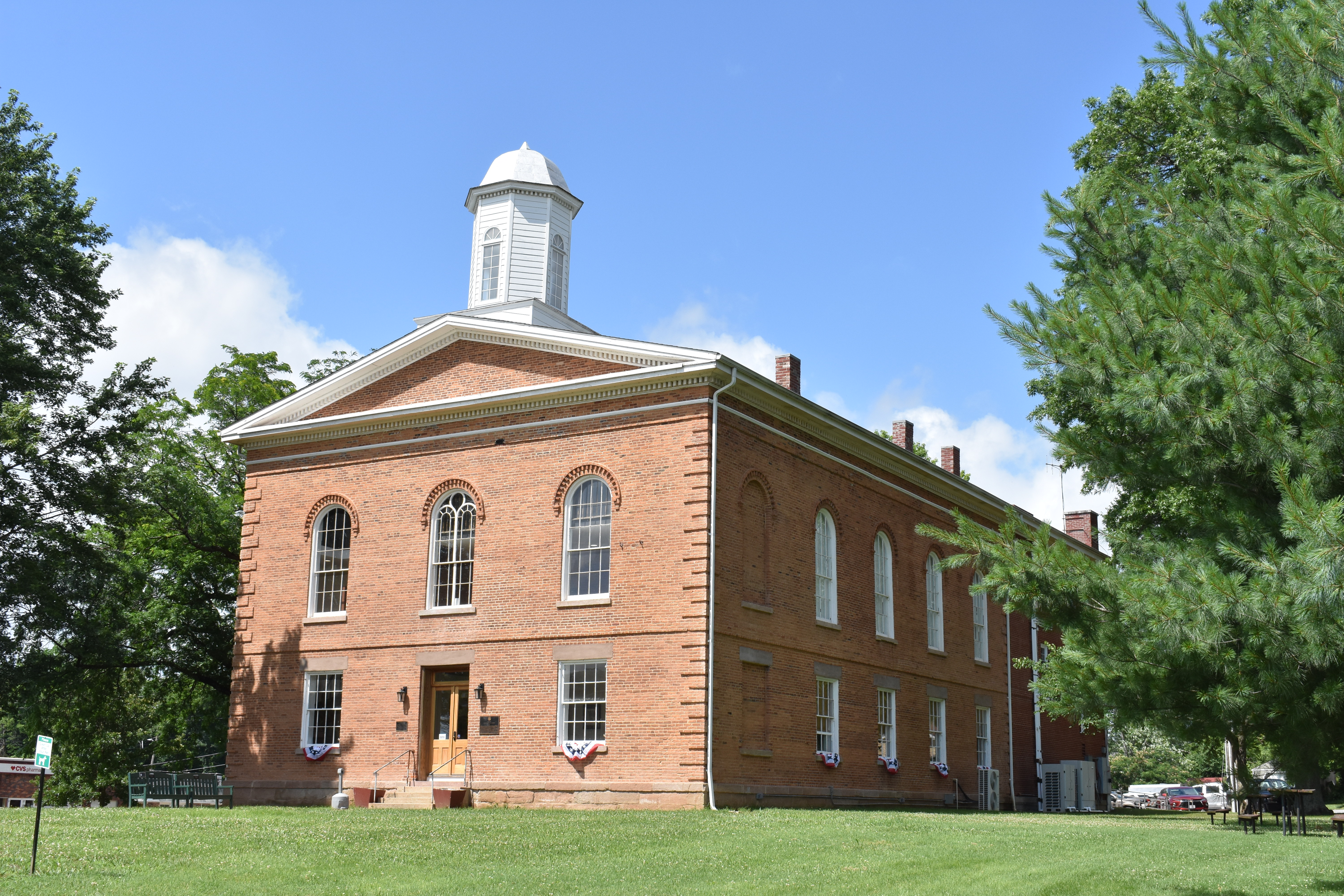
- County courthouse in Ironton

- Location within the U.S. state of Missouri
- Coordinates: 37°33′N 90°46′W
- Country: United States
- State: Missouri
- Founded: February 17, 1857
- Named for: Iron ore
- Seat: Ironton
- Largest city: Ironton

Area
  - Total: 552 sq mi (1,430 km^{2})
  - Land: 550 sq mi (1,400 km^{2})
  - Water: 1.8 sq mi (4.7 km^{2}) 0.3%

Population (2020)
  - Total: 9,537
  - Estimate (2025): 9,318 ▼
  - Density: 17/sq mi (6.7/km^{2})
- Time zone: UTC−6 (Central)
  - Summer (DST): UTC−5 (CDT)
- Congressional district: 8th
- Website: https://ironcountymo.gov/

Iron County is a county located in the Lead Belt region in the U.S. state of Missouri. As of the 2020 census, the population was 9,537. The largest city and county seat is Ironton. Iron County was officially organized on February 17, 1857, and was named after the abundance of iron ore found within its borders.

Iron County includes the 6-mile (9.7 km)-long, 2-mile (3.2 km)-wide Arcadia Valley, the site of Pilot Knob, Ironton, and Arcadia, communities established by immigrants in the 19th Century. The valley is surrounded by the Saint Francois Mountains of the Ozarks Plateau. Iron County is also home to dozens of mountains, including the 1,772-foot (540 m) Taum Sauk Mountain, the highest point in Missouri.

The county is home to a number of state parks and historical sites including Taum Sauk Mountain State Park, Elephant Rocks State Park and Fort Davidson State Historic Site as well as 96,047 acres (390 km^{2}) of Mark Twain National Forest.

== Geography ==
According to the U.S. Census Bureau, the county has a total area of 552 square miles (1,430 km^{2}), of which 550 square miles (1,400 km^{2}) is land and 1.8 square miles (4.7 km^{2}) (0.3%) is water.

=== Adjacent counties ===
- Washington County (north)
- St. Francois County (northeast)
- Madison County (east)
- Wayne County (southeast)
- Reynolds County (southwest)
- Dent County (west)
- Crawford County (northwest)

=== National protected areas ===
- Mark Twain National Forest (part)
- Pilot Knob National Wildlife Refuge

== Demographics ==
Historical population
Census	Pop.	Note	%±
1860	5,842		—
1870	6,278		7.5%
1880	8,183		30.3%
1890	9,119		11.4%
1900	8,716		−4.4%
1910	8,563		−1.8%
1920	9,458		10.5%
1930	9,642		1.9%
1940	10,440		8.3%
1950	9,458		−9.4%
1960	8,041		−15.0%
1970	9,529		18.5%
1980	11,084		16.3%
1990	10,726		−3.2%
2000	10,697		−0.3%
2010	10,630		−0.6%
2020	9,537		−10.3%
2025 (est.)	9,318	▼	−2.3%
U.S. Decennial Census; 1790-1960 1900-1990; 1990-2000 2010-2015 2020

=== 2020 census ===
As of the 2020 census, the county had a population of 9,537. The median age was 45.9 years, 21.0% of residents were under the age of 18, and 22.7% of residents were 65 years of age or older. For every 100 females there were 100.5 males, and for every 100 females age 18 and over there were 98.3 males age 18 and over.

The racial makeup of the county was 91.1% White, 1.5% Black or African American, 0.7% American Indian and Alaska Native, 0.4% Asian, 0.0% Native Hawaiian and Pacific Islander, 0.1% from some other race, and 6.1% from two or more races. Hispanic or Latino residents of any race comprised 1.9% of the population.

0.0% of residents lived in urban areas, while 100.0% lived in rural areas.

There were 3,892 households in the county, of which 26.8% had children under the age of 18 living with them and 25.2% had a female householder with no spouse or partner present. About 29.7% of all households were made up of individuals and 15.8% had someone living alone who was 65 years of age or older.

There were 4,688 housing units, of which 17.0% were vacant. Among occupied housing units, 72.9% were owner-occupied and 27.1% were renter-occupied. The homeowner vacancy rate was 1.8% and the rental vacancy rate was 7.1%.

Iron County, Missouri – Racial and ethnic composition Note: the US Census treats Hispanic/Latino as an ethnic category. This table excludes Latinos from the racial categories and assigns them to a separate category. Hispanics/Latinos may be of any race.
Race / Ethnicity (NH = Non-Hispanic)	Pop 1980	Pop 1990	Pop 2000	Pop 2010	Pop 2020	% 1980	% 1990	% 2000	% 2010	% 2020
White alone (NH)	10,911	10,601	10,314	10,162	8,602	98.44%	98.83%	96.42%	95.60%	90.20%
Black or African American alone (NH)	44	49	163	131	136	0.40%	0.46%	1.52%	1.23%	1.43%
Native American or Alaska Native alone (NH)	26	14	35	51	60	0.23%	0.13%	0.33%	0.48%	0.63%
Asian alone (NH)	23	12	10	11	34	0.21%	0.11%	0.09%	0.10%	0.36%
Native Hawaiian or Pacific Islander alone (NH)	x	x	0	0	2	x	x	0.00%	0.00%	0.02%
Other race alone (NH)	6	6	2	2	4	0.05%	0.06%	0.02%	0.02%	0.04%
Mixed race or Multiracial (NH)	x	x	111	140	522	x	x	1.04%	1.32%	5.47%
Hispanic or Latino (any race)	74	44	62	133	177	0.67%	0.41%	0.58%	1.25%	1.86%
Total	11,084	10,726	10,697	10,630	9,537	100.00%	100.00%	100.00%	100.00%	100.00%

=== 2000 census ===
As of the census of 2000, there were 10,697 people, 4,197 households, and 2,963 families residing in the county. The population density was 7/km^{2} (18/mi^{2}). There were 4,907 housing units at an average density of 3/km^{2} (7.8/mi^{2}). The racial makeup of the county was 96.74% White, 1.56% Black or African American, 0.34% Native American, 0.09% Asian, 0.22% from other races, and 1.05% from two or more races. Approximately 0.58% of the population were Hispanic or Latino of any race.

There were 4,197 households, out of which 32.00% had children under the age of 18 living with them, 56.80% were married couples living together, 9.40% had a female householder with no husband present, and 29.40% were non-families. 25.80% of all households were made up of individuals, and 11.40% had someone living alone who was 65 years of age or older. The average household size was 2.46 and the average family size was 2.94.

In the county, the population was spread out, with 25.00% under the age of 18, 7.80% from 18 to 24, 25.30% from 25 to 44, 24.80% from 45 to 64, and 17.10% who were 65 years of age or older. The median age was 40 years. For every 100 females there were 94.80 males. For every 100 females age 18 and over, there were 90.80 males.

The median income for a household in the county was $31,276, and the median income for a family was $38,037. Males had a median income of $28,603 versus $16,615 for females. The per capita income for the county was $16,717. About 13.80% of families and 19.00% of the population were below the poverty line, including 27.60% of those under age 18 and 13.20% of those age 65 or over.

=== Religion ===
According to the Association of Religion Data Archives County Membership Report (2000), Iron County is a part of the Bible Belt with evangelical Protestantism being the majority religion. The most predominant denominations among residents in Iron County who adhere to a religion are Southern Baptists (56.62%), Methodists (10.60%), and Roman Catholics (7.82%).

== Politics ==
=== Local ===
Control is evenly split at the local level in Iron County. Democrats hold 7 of the 14 positions in the county, while Republicans control the other 7.

Iron County, Missouri

Elected countywide officials
Assessor	David L. Huff	Democratic
Circuit Clerk	Sammye (Gail) White	Democratic
County Clerk	Stephanie Lebron	Republican
Collector	Crystal Price	Republican
Commissioner (presiding)	Jim Scaggs	Democratic
Commissioner (district 1)	Ben Young	Republican
Commissioner (district 2)	Ronnie Chandler	Republican
Coroner	Tim Harbison	Republican
Prosecuting Attorney	Brian Parker	Democratic
Public Administrator	Lisa Light	Republican
Recorder	Karen K. Reagan	Democratic
Sheriff	Jeff Burkett	Republican
Surveyor	Mark Nations	Democratic
Treasurer	Carol Hardy	Democratic

=== State ===
In the Missouri House of Representatives, all of Iron County is a part of Missouri's 144th District and is currently represented by Republican Paul Fitzwater of Potosi. Fitzwater was elected in 2016 to his fourth and final term in the Missouri House.

In the Missouri Senate, all of Iron County is a part of Missouri's 3rd District and is currently represented by Republican Gary Romine of Farmington. Romine defeated former Democratic State Representative Joseph Fallert, Jr. of Ste. Genevieve in 2012 with 53.84 percent of the vote in the district, which includes most of the Missouri Lead Belt region. The seat was vacated by former Republican State Senator Kevin Engler of Farmington. Engler successfully served two terms/eight years in the Missouri Senate and was ineligible to seek a third term due to term limits.

Past gubernatorial elections results
Year	Republican	Democratic	Third Parties
2024	77.30% 3,399	19.35% 851	3.24% 147
2020	72.08% 3,266	24.39% 1,105	3.53% 160
2016	60.76% 2,600	34.99% 1,497	4.25% 182
2012	39.87% 1,596	56.91% 2,278	3.22% 129
2008	33.45% 1,483	64.14% 2,844	2.41% 107
2004	50.62% 2,359	47.53% 2,215	2.85% 86
2000	45.42% 2,002	51.23% 2,258	3.35% 148
1996	35.54% 1,470	62.60% 2,589	1.86% 77
1992	37.07% 1,653	62.93% 2,806	0.00% 0
1988	55.65% 2,290	44.16% 1,817	0.19% 8
1984	50.01% 2,127	49.99% 2,126	0.00% 0
1980	51.18% 2,322	48.62% 2,206	0.20% 9
1976	46.76% 2,043	52.99% 2,315	0.25% 11
1972	51.80% 1,840	48.86% 1,760	0.06% 2
1968	33.82% 1,246	66.18% 2,438	0.00% 0
1964	28.59% 1,066	71.41% 2,662	0.00% 0
1960	38.41% 1,465	61.59% 2,349	0.00% 0

=== Federal ===
Missouri's two U.S. senators are Republicans Josh Hawley and Eric Schmitt.

Hawley was elected to his first term in 2018 with 51.4 percent of the statewide vote over Democratic U.S. Senator Claire McCaskill; Iron County voters backed Hawley with 62.6 percent of the vote.

U.S. Senate - Class I - Iron County (2018)
Party	Candidate	Votes	%	±%
Republican	Josh Hawley	2,236	62.6	
Democratic	Claire McCaskill	1,231	34.4	

Roy Blunt was re-elected in 2016 with 49.3 percent of the statewide vote over Democratic Missouri Secretary of State Jason Kander, Libertarian Jonathan Dine of Riverside, Constitutionalist Fred Ryman, and Green Party candidate Johnathan McFarland; Iron County voters supported Blunt with over 55 percent of the vote.

U.S. Senate - Class III - Iron County (2016)
Party	Candidate	Votes	%	±%
Republican	Roy Blunt	2,329	55.10	
Democratic	Jason Kander	1,671	39.53	
Libertarian	Jonathan Dine	102	2.41	
Green	Johnathan McFarland	79	1.87	
Constitution	Fred Ryman	46	1.09	

All of Iron County is included in Missouri's 8th Congressional District and is currently represented by Republican Jason T. Smith of Salem in the U.S. House of Representatives. Smith won a special election on Tuesday, June 4, 2013, to complete the remaining term of former Republican U.S. Representative Jo Ann Emerson of Cape Girardeau. Emerson announced her resignation a month after being reelected with over 70 percent of the vote in the district. She resigned to become CEO of the National Rural Electric Cooperative.

U.S. House of Representatives - District 8 – Iron County (2012)
Party	Candidate	Votes	%	±%
Republican	Jo Ann Emerson	2,741	69.01	+15.84
Democratic	Jack Rushin	1,113	28.02	−13.51
Libertarian	Rick Vandeven	118	2.97	+0.19

U.S. House of Representatives - District 8 - Special Election – Iron County (2013)
Party	Candidate	Votes	%	±%
Republican	Jason T. Smith	409	52.44	
Democratic	Steve Hodges	229	43.46	
Constitution	Doug Enyart	20	2.56	
Libertarian	Bill Slantz	6	0.77	
Write-In	Thomas Brown	6	0.77	

U.S. House of Representatives - District 8 – Iron County (2020)
Party	Candidate	Votes	%	±%
Republican	Jason T. Smith	3,358	75.9	
Democratic	Kathy Ellis	985	22.3	
Libertarian	Tom Schmitz	82	1.9	

==== Political culture ====
United States presidential election results for Iron County, Missouri
Year	Republican		Democratic		Third party(ies)	
Year	No.	%	No.	%	No.	%
1888	662	37.44%	1,004	56.79%	102	5.77%
1892	568	38.74%	880	60.03%	18	1.23%
1896	607	37.24%	1,016	62.33%	7	0.43%
1900	642	40.20%	932	58.36%	23	1.44%
1904	670	42.92%	861	55.16%	30	1.92%
1908	828	46.60%	931	52.39%	18	1.01%
1912	666	40.22%	845	51.03%	145	8.76%
1916	874	45.14%	1,027	53.05%	35	1.81%
1920	1,463	47.64%	1,554	50.60%	54	1.76%
1924	1,328	43.24%	1,675	54.54%	68	2.21%
1928	1,910	58.68%	1,342	41.23%	3	0.09%
1932	1,439	34.49%	2,689	64.45%	44	1.05%
1936	1,605	39.84%	2,413	59.89%	11	0.27%
1940	2,062	45.17%	2,495	54.65%	8	0.18%
1944	1,649	42.79%	2,205	57.21%	0	0.00%
1948	1,435	35.93%	2,552	63.90%	7	0.18%
1952	1,831	44.40%	2,286	55.43%	7	0.17%
1956	1,810	47.88%	1,970	52.12%	0	0.00%
1960	2,122	53.41%	1,851	46.59%	0	0.00%
1964	1,050	27.78%	2,730	72.22%	0	0.00%
1968	1,600	41.60%	1,755	45.63%	491	12.77%
1972	2,203	62.07%	1,346	37.93%	0	0.00%
1976	1,765	39.81%	2,646	59.68%	23	0.52%
1980	2,205	48.45%	2,226	48.91%	120	2.64%
1984	2,316	53.38%	2,023	46.62%	0	0.00%
1988	1,877	45.01%	2,283	54.75%	10	0.24%
1992	1,276	27.54%	2,507	54.10%	851	18.36%
1996	1,328	31.92%	2,221	53.39%	611	14.69%
2000	2,237	50.68%	2,044	46.31%	133	3.01%
2004	2,477	52.94%	2,157	46.10%	45	0.96%
2008	2,090	47.35%	2,213	50.14%	111	2.51%
2012	2,252	55.87%	1,669	41.40%	110	2.73%
2016	3,173	74.33%	933	21.86%	163	3.82%
2020	3,596	78.31%	945	20.58%	51	1.11%
2024	3,644	80.66%	824	18.24%	50	1.11%

Historically, Iron County has been one of the most reliably Democratic counties in Missouri. Located in the Lead Belt region of the state, mining has been important to the county's economy. It was one of only three predominantly rural counties in Missouri to vote for Barack Obama in 2008 (nearby Washington and Ste. Genevieve counties being the other two). Like much of the rest of the state's rural areas, the county saw a rapid rightward swing starting in 2000, when George W. Bush became the first Republican since 1984 (and the second since 1972) to carry it, after Bill Clinton had carried it in 1996 by over twenty points. Apart from the interruption in 2008, the Republican vote share has, as of 2024, grown in every subsequent election. At the local and state levels, however, Iron County still remains quite Democratic. At the same time Romney won Iron County by 15 points in 2012, all Democratic statewide candidates Jay Nixon (Governor), Claire McCaskill (U.S. Senator), Jason Kander (Secretary of State), Chris Koster (Attorney General), and Clint Zweifel (State Treasurer) carried Iron County by healthy margins; Peter Kinder (Lieutenant Governor) was the only other statewide Republican to win Iron County alongside Romney, and even then, the margin of victory was smaller than in most other rural counties.

Like most rural areas throughout Southeast Missouri, voters in Iron County generally adhere to socially and culturally conservative principles but are more moderate or populist on economic issues. In 2004, Missourians voted on a constitutional amendment to define marriage as the union between a man and a woman—it overwhelmingly passed Iron County with 80.90 percent of the vote. The initiative passed the state with 71 percent of support from voters as Missouri became the first state to ban same-sex marriage. In 2006, Missourians voted on a constitutional amendment to fund and legalize embryonic stem cell research in the state—it failed in Iron County with 56.03 percent voting against the measure. The initiative narrowly passed the state with 51 percent of support from voters as Missouri became one of the first states in the nation to approve embryonic stem cell research. Despite Iron County's longstanding tradition of supporting socially conservative platforms, voters in the county have a penchant for advancing populist causes like increasing the minimum wage. In 2006, Missourians voted on a proposition (Proposition B) to increase the minimum wage in the state to $6.50 an hour—it passed Iron County with 78.25 percent of the vote. The proposition strongly passed every single county in Missouri with 75.94 percent voting in favor as the minimum wage was increased to $6.50 an hour in the state. During the same election, voters in five other states also strongly approved increases in the minimum wage.

=== Missouri presidential preference primary (2008) ===
In the 2008 Missouri Presidential Preference Primary, voters in Iron County from both political parties supported candidates who finished in second place in the state at large and nationally. Former U.S. Senator Hillary Clinton (D-New York) received more votes, a total of 1,180, than any candidate from either party in Iron County during the 2008 Missouri Presidential Primaries. She also received more votes altogether than the total number of votes cast in the entire Republican Primary in Iron County.

== Education ==
Of adults 25 years of age and older in Iron County, 65.2% possesses a high school diploma or higher while 8.4% holds a bachelor's degree or higher as their highest educational attainment.

=== Public schools ===
- Arcadia Valley School District - Ironton
  - Arcadia Valley Elementary School (PK-04)
  - Arcadia Valley Middle School (05-08)
  - Arcadia Valley High School (09-12)
- Belleview R-III Elementary School - Belleview - (K-08)
- Iron County C-4 School District - Viburnum
  - Viburnum Elementary School (K-06)
  - Viburnum High School (07-12)
- South Iron County R-I School District - Annapolis
  - South Iron County Elementary School (PK-06)
  - South Iron County High School (07-12)

=== Vocational/technical schools ===
- Arcadia Valley Career Technical Center - Ironton - (09-12)

=== Public libraries ===
- Ozark Regional Library

== Transportation ==
=== State highways ===
- Route 21
- Route 32
- Route 49
- Route 72
- Route 143
- Route 221

=== Railroads ===
- The Iron Mountain Railroad, later incorporated into Union Pacific, runs through Arcadia Valley. The train station in Arcadia serves Amtrak's Texas Eagle.

== Communities ==
=== Cities and Towns ===
- Annapolis
- Arcadia
- Belleview
- Des Arc
- Ironton (county seat)
- Pilot Knob
- Viburnum

=== Unincorporated communities ===
- Banner
- Belleview
- Bixby
- Chloride
- Ghermanville
- Glover
- Good Water
- Goodland
- Graniteville
- Hogan
- Middlebrook
- Minimum
- Pin Hook
- Redmondville
- Sabula
- Vulcan

== See also ==
- National Register of Historic Places listings in Iron County, Missouri
