= Missouri French =

Moribund French variety of the upper Mississippi, US

- Paw Paw French
- français du Missouri
- The flag of the French colony of Upper Louisiana.
- Native to: Missouri, Illinois, Indiana
- Region: French settlements along Mississippi River of Upper Louisiana
- Native speakers: <12 (Expected to be extinct as a L1 language in the 2030s) (2015)
- Language family: Indo-European: Italic; Latino-Faliscan; Latinic; Romance; Italo-Western; Western; Gallo-Iberian; Gallo-Romance; Gallo-Rhaetian?; Arpitan–Oïl; Oïl; Francien zone; French; Missouri French

Language codes
- ISO 639-3: –
- Glottolog: None
- IETF: fr-u-sd-usmo
- Counties where Missouri French is or was formerly spoken.

Missouri French (French: français du Missouri) or Illinois Country French (French: français du Pays des Illinois) also known as français vincennois, français Cahok, and nicknamed "Paw-Paw French" often by individuals outside the community but not exclusively, is a variety of the French language spoken in the upper Mississippi River Valley in the Midwestern United States, particularly in eastern Missouri.

The language is one of the major varieties of French that developed in the United States. At one point it was widely spoken in areas along the Creole Corridor in Bonne Terre, Valles Mines, Desloge, De Soto, Ste. Genevieve, Old Mines, Cadet, St. Louis, Richwoods, Prairie du Rocher, Cahokia, Kaskaskia, and Vincennes as well as several other locations. Speakers of Missouri French may call themselves "créoles", as they are descendants of colonial Louisiana French people of the Illinois Country (Upper Louisiana) and their native-born descendants.

Today the dialect is highly endangered, with only a few elderly native speakers living in or around Old Mines, Missouri.

== History ==
French colonization of the region began in earnest during the late 17th century by coureurs des bois from what is now modern-day Canada. With French colonial expansion into the North American interior, various missions, forts and trading posts were established under the administration of New France.

One of the first settlements to be established in the region was that of Cahokia in 1696, with the foundation of a French mission. The town quickly became one of the largest in the region with booming commerce and trade to assist its growth. Jesuit missionaries also established a mission to the south along the Kaskaskia River in 1703, followed by a stone church built in 1714. During that time, Canadien settlers had moved in and begun to farm. Some also mined for lead west of the Mississippi River. The fertile land of the American Bottom was tended to by habitants who moved from Prairie du Rocher. Soon the meager French post of Kaskaskia became the capital of Upper Louisiana, and Fort de Chartres was constructed nearby.

Since its inception, Kaskaskia possessed a diverse population, a majority of whom were Illinois or other Native American groups, with a minority of French voyageurs. Many of the Canadiens and their descendants would eventually become voyageurs and coureurs des bois. Continued immigration of Canadien settlers and natives of Illinois Country, as well as a need for other resources resulted in some founders establishing Sainte-Geneviève in 1735 on the west side of the Mississippi in what is now Missouri.

In 1732, following a short-lived French trading post for buffalo hides, Vincennes was established as a French fur trading post for the Compagnie des Indes (Company of the Indies) under the leadership of François-Marie Bissot, Sieur de Vincennes. The trade was primarily with the Miami, and was so lucrative that more Canadiens were attracted to the post. In addition, marriages took place between French settlers (usually men) and women from the local Native American tribes. Both sides considered such unions to be to their advantage for long-term alliances and trading relationships.

Originally granted as a French trading post in 1763, St. Louis quickly developed into a settlement under Pierre Laclède. By this time, the French had established several footholds along the upper Mississippi River such as Cahokia, Kaskaskia, St. Philippe, Nouvelle Chartres, Prairie du Rocher, and Ste. Genevieve. Even so, after the British victory in the French and Indian War in 1763, many francophone residents of Illinois Country moved west of the Mississippi River to Ste. Genevieve, St. Louis, and elsewhere. Additionally, following France's loss in the War, Louisiana was ceded to Spain in Treaty of Fontainebleau. Several hundred French refugees from the Midwest were resettled at Ste. Genevieve by the Spanish in 1797. From the end of the French and Indian War through the early 19th century, francophones began settling in the Ozark highlands further inland, particularly after French Louisiana was sold to the United States in 1803.

=== Mining ===
It is speculated that Native Americans may have already begun to process lead in the Upper Louisiana Valley by the 18th century, in part due to interaction with coureurs des bois and European expeditions. French demand for lead quickly outstripped available labor despite French colonial reliance on Native Americans, freelancer miners, and 500 African slaves shipped from Saint-Domingue in 1723 to work in the area of Mine à Breton, under control of Philippe François de Renault . With large quantities of ore visible from the surface, entire Creole families moved inland to exploit such plentiful resources. When Moses Austin settled in Potosi, formally Mine à Breton, he introduced serious mining operations into Missouri in 1797 and stimulated growth of the francophone community in the area. Mining communities such as Old Mines (French: La Vieille Mine), Mine La Motte, and St. Michel (St. Michaels), which were established further inland, remained well-connected to Ste. Genevieve through trade, familial ties, and a formed common identity.

=== Decline ===
The Louisiana Purchase brought about a marked change: francophones of Ste. Genevieve and St. Louis assimilated more rapidly into English-speaking American society because of interaction with new settlers, while the inland mining communities remained isolated and maintained their French heritage. Piocheurs held fast to primitive techniques, using hand tools and simple pit mining. They performed smelting over crude, chopped-wood fires. Soon, ethnic French families in St. Louis and Ste. Genevieve, as well as American companies, purchased the land occupied by the Creoles. They created a division between an increasingly anglophone authority and francophone labor. By the 1820s production of lead had declined in the area of Old Mines. Following the Civil War, new mining technologies left the community impoverished.

The eventual decline of Illinois Country French did not occur at the same rates as it inevitably did in other areas. Most attribute the survival of the language in Old Mines primarily due to its relative isolation, as compared to other communities such as St. Louis or Ste. Genevieve.

In 1809, the French street signs of St. Louis were replaced, but the population remained largely ethnic French through the 19th century. Migration of francophones from New Orleans, Kaskaskia, and Detroit bolstered the French-speaking population. Two French-language newspapers, Le Patriote (English: The Patriot) and La Revue de l'Ouest (English: The Review of the West) were published during the second half of the 19th century, with an intended audience of the "French-language population of 'The West'", but the papers fell out of print before the turn of the century.

Outside of St. Louis, French survived into the 20th century but the francophone population of settlements near the Mississippi River had dropped dramatically:

... few Créoles to be found today in the towns along the river, with the exception of Festus and Crystal City, where many of them are employed in the factories. Sainte-Geneviève has no more than a score of families which have remained definitely French.

— Ward Allison Dorrance, The Survival of French in the Old District of Sainte-Geneviève, 1935

French did not fare far better in distant Vincennes where German immigration in the 1860s had severely weakened the French community and by 1930 there were only a small population of elderly francophones left.

In the 1930s and 1940s, use of new excavation equipment by mineral companies almost entirely pushed French-speaking Creoles from mining, leaving them without income. French became associated with poverty, lack of education, and backwardness. Harassment and intolerance from English speakers left many Missouri French speakers ashamed of their language and hesitant to speak. Use of French on school property was prohibited and it was not uncommon for students to face corporal punishment by monolingual, English-speaking teachers for using the language.

In 1930, French professor W. M. Miller visited this area of rural Missouri, finding the largest remaining concentration of Missouri French speakers in a small pocket south of De Soto and north of Potosi. He estimated their population to be about 2,000, all bilingual. There were rumors that at least a few elderly, French monolingual speakers remained, but few young people spoke the language and their children were all monolingual English speakers. From 1934 to 1936, Joseph Médard Carrière made several trips to the Old Mines area to study the Missouri French dialect and to collect folktales from local conteurs. Carrière estimated a total of 600 families still used the dialect. He noted the increased influence of English, particularly among younger speakers, and felt this was a sign of eventual displacement.

In 1977, Gerald L. Gold visited the community to document how movement away from family and child labor in lead and baryte mining coincided with the loss of Missouri French as a maternal language. He suggests that the 1970 census statistic of 196 native French speakers in Washington County underrepresented the true number of speakers. In 1989, Ulrich Ammon estimated that only a handful of elderly speakers remained in isolated pockets. In 2014 news media reported that fewer than 30 Missouri French speakers remained in Old Mines, with others being able to remember a few phrases.

=== Revival ===
Periodic attempts have been made to preserve the dialect, for the most part with minor results. At the turn of the 20th century, Belgian Creole Père Tourenhaut attempted to preserve French at the Ste. Genevieve Church but to no avail. Joseph Médard Carrière published Tales from the French Folk-lore of Missouri (1937), a collection of 73 stories he had collected from the Old Mines area. The works of Miller and Carrière on the dialect helped to preserve some of Missouri French's lexical intricacies as well as document the influences of English as it was absorbed into the language. In 1941, Carrière published a study on the phonology of Missouri French and some of the archaic pronunciations it had preserved in its isolation.

The work Folk Songs of Old Vincennes was published in 1946, helping to preserve some of the culture and language that had linked francophones across Illinois Country.

Starting in 1977, serious efforts began to revive the language; classes were offered in Old Mines assisted by eight native Missouri French speakers. By 1979, classes were held weekly with professional instruction and specific focus on Missouri French with eight core lessons; the course was regularly attended by 20 people. Three years later, the book It's Good to Tell You: French Folktales from Missouri (1982) was published, highlighting some of the best stories from the community and providing English translations.

=== 21st century revivals ===
Since 2013, Illinois Country French and culture classes have been offered by French Creole musician Dennis Stroughmatt at Wabash Valley College in Mt. Carmel, Illinois. He has also taught periodic workshops for the Old Mines Area Historical Society. Growing up near Vincennes, Indiana, in the 1990s Stroughmatt learned to play the fiddle and speak the regional dialect in Old Mines and Festus, Missouri, and Cahokia, Illinois.

In 2015 a handful of small classes were held in Ste. Genevieve. Soon after, Illinois Country French Preservation Inc. was formed; it offered a five-week course in Missouri French.

== Phonology ==
Carrière described Missouri French as generally phonetically similar to other North American varieties, though with a number of distinguishing features. Other phonological elements are unique in North American French, sometimes retaining archaic elements:

- Varying on examples, the following pronunciations are present but not widespread:
  - Use of [ɑː] can be found in words such as cage [kɑːʒ] and vache [vɑːʃ]
  - In [ɛ̃] in place of un [œ̃]
  - [z] instead of [ʒ] like in bonzour/bonjour [bɔ̃zuːr]
- As with 16th century pronunciation:
  - [o] did not raise to [u] in gordon [ɡordɔ̃] and pomon [pomɔ̃]
  - [ɔ] did not shift to [wa] in pogner [pɔɲ]
  - Incomplete denasalization of [ɔ̃] in bonne [bon]~[bɔ̃n] and pomme [pom]~[pɔ̃m]
  - [h] remains, like in other North American dialects, in haut [ho] or haine [hɛn] but is also added to elle [hɛl] and ensemble [hɑ̃sɑ̃ːb]

== Vocabulary ==
As compared to other dialects of French in North America, Missouri French shares many lexical similarities. The language has influence mainly from English but also Spanish, Native American languages:

| Missouri French | Canadian French | Louisiana French | Standard French | English |
|---|---|---|---|---|
| beaujour | bonjour | bonjour | bonjour | hello, hi, good morning |
| brindgème (f.) | aubergine (f.) | brème (f.) | aubergine (f.) | eggplant/aubergine |
| bétail (m.) | bibite/bébite (f.) | bétaille (f.) | insecte (m.) | insect/bug |
| boule (f.) | balle (f.) | pelote (f.) | balle (f.) | ball (small) |
| candi (m.) | bonbon (m.) | candi (m.) | bonbon (m.) | candy/sweet |
| char (m.) | auto (f.) voiture (f.) char (m.) | char (m.) | voiture (f.) | automobile/car |
| chat-chouage (m.) | raton laveur (m.) | chaoui/chat-oui (m.) | raton laveur (m.) | raccoon |
| estourneau (m.) | merle (m.) | tchac/tchoc/choque (m.) | merle (m.) | blackbird |
| esquilette (f.) | poêlon (m.) | poêlon (m.) | poêle (f.) | skillet |
| fève (f.) | bine (m.) fève (f.) | bine (m.) fève (f.) | haricot (m.) | bean |
| guime (f.) | jeu (f.) partie (f.) game (f.) | jeu (m.) partie (f.) guème (m.) | jeu (m.) partie (f.) | game |
| maringouin (m.) moustique (m.) | maringouin (m.) picaouin (m.) moustique (m.) | moustique (m.) maringouin (m.) cousin (m.) | moustique (m.) | mosquito |
| metche (f.) | allumette (f.) | allumette (f.) | allumette (f.) | match |
| patate (m.) | patate (f.) | patate (f.) | pomme de terre (f.) | potato |
| piastre (m.) | dollar (m.) piasse (f.) | piastre (f.) | dollar (m.) | dollar |
| pistache (f.) | pinotte (f.) arachide (f.) | pistache (m.) | cacahuète (f.) | peanut |
| quisine (f.) | cuisine (f.) | cuisine (f.) | cuisine (f.) | kitchen |
| rabiole (m.) | navet (m.) | navet (m.) | navet (m.) | turnip |
| zouéseau à mouches (m.) | colibri (m.) oiseau-mouche (m.) | suce-fleur (m.) colibri (m.) oiseau-mouche (m.) | colibri (m.) | hummingbird |

During his trips to Old Mines, Carrière found that Missouri French had been heavily influenced by English, with many English words and even entire idiomatic phrases borrowed or translated into the dialect due in large part to language attrition.

== Examples ==
"C'est bon d'vous dzire eune fouès c'étaient ein vieux rouè pis eune vieille reine. 'L ontvaient eune fille qu'était mariée et qui I'avait ein mouèyen p'tsit garçon. Pis dans c'te ville-là, 'I avait ein homme qui s'app'lait Som'pson. l' restait dans I'bois, lui. I'avait pas d'dzifférence quoi 'rouè faisait, i' l'détruisait, lui, i' l'démanchait. L'rouè avait fait perdre ein tas des hommes pour essayer d'faire détruire Sam'son. II a offert eune bonne somme d'argent pour n'importe qui y'aurait donné ein avis pour attraper Sam'son."

"It's good to tell you that once upon a time there were an old king and an old queen. They had a daughter who was married, and she had a little boy. In that town, there was also a man named Samson, who lived in the woods. No matter what the king did, Samson destroyed it. The king had lost many men trying to get rid of Samson. He offered a good sum of money to anyone who could give him an idea that would work to catch Samson."

— Thomas, Rosemary Hyde (1982). It's Good to Tell You: French Folktales from Missouri. Thomas, Ronald W. (Illustrator). University of Missouri Press. pp. 6, 18. ISBN 978-0826203274., Paragraph 1 of La Bête à Sept Têtes/The Seven-Headed Beast

== See also ==
- French language in Minnesota
- Louisiana French
- Canadian French
- American French
