= Adelbert, Missouri =

Extinct hamlet in Missouri, U.S.

Coordinates: 37°58′15″N 90°42′36″W

Adelbert is an extinct town in Washington County, in the U.S. state of Missouri. The site is adjacent to the Missouri Pacific Railroad line on the west side of Mill Creek and one mile north of Mineral Point and southeast of Fountain Farm. Cadet lies approximately two miles to the northeast on Missouri Route 47.

A post office called Adelbert was established in 1922, and remained in operation until 1925. The community has the name of Adelbert E. Stockings, a businessperson in the local lead-mining industry.
