= Ebo Creek =

Stream in the American state of Missouri

Ebo Creek is a stream in Washington County in the U.S. state of Missouri. It is a tributary of Fourche a Renault.

The stream headwaters arise about nine miles northwest of Potosi at an elevation of about 1,050 ft (320 m). The stream flows south and then east to pass under Missouri Route 185 just south of the community of Ebo. The stream continues to the east-northeast to its confluence with the Fourche a Renault about one mile south of the community of Aptus. The confluence elevation is 709 ft (216 m).

The source is located at 38°01′58″N 90°55′32″W and the confluence is at 38°01′41″N 90°51′20″W.

It is unknown why the name "Ebo" was applied to this stream. The French explored the area for mining potential in the early 1700s, and a mine called the Ebo Lead Mines is located in the area.

== See also ==
- List of rivers of Missouri
