= Bezidek Hill =

Summit in the American state of Missouri

Coordinates: 38°00′08″N 90°41′56″W

Bezidek Hill is a summit in Washington County the U.S. state of Missouri. It has an elevation of 866 feet (264 m). The summit is in a mined area one half mile east of Shibboleth and Missouri Route E.

Bezidek Hill has the name of a businessperson in the local lead-mining industry.
