= Old Prairie Branch =

Stream in the American state of Missouri

Coordinates: 38.059217°N 90.757353°W

Old Prairie Branch is a stream in Washington County in the U.S. state of Missouri. It is a tributary of Old Mines Creek.

Old Prairie Branch took its name from a prairie of the same name near its course. The namesake prairie itself is gone, and the location of it unknown to the GNIS.

== See also ==
- List of rivers of Missouri
