= Belgrade (disambiguation) =

Belgrade is the capital and largest city of Serbia.

Belgrade, Belgrad or Beograd may also refer to:

== Places ==
=== Belgium ===
- Belgrade, Namur, one of the old communes now included in the City of Namur

=== Croatia ===
- Belgrad, a village currently part of Grižane-Belgrad

=== Italy ===
- Belgrado, a locality in Varmo, Friuli-Venezia Giulia

=== United States ===
- Belgrade, Maine
- Belgrade, Minnesota
- Belgrade, Missouri
- Belgrade, Montana
- Belgrade, Nebraska
- Belgrade, Texas
- Belgrade Lakes, Maine
- Belgrade Township (disambiguation)

=== South Africa ===
- Belgrade, KwaZulu-Natal

== Other ==
- Belgrad Forest, outside Istanbul, Turkey.
- Belgrade (film), a 2013 documentary about Belgrade, Serbia
- 1517 Beograd, an asteroid, discovered by Milorad B. Protić
- Beograd (band), a pop band
- Belgrade Theatre, in Coventry, United Kingdom
- Belgrade and St. David's Church, Creswell, North Carolina

== People with the name ==
- Doug Belgrad, American film and TV producer
- Robert Belgrade, American musician and voice actor

== See also ==
- Belgorod
- White City (disambiguation)
