= Frogtown (disambiguation) =

Frogtown may refer to:

== Places ==
United States

- Frogtown, Saint Paul, a neighborhood in Saint Paul, Minnesota
- Frogtown, Los Angeles, a neighborhood
- Frogtown, Missouri, an unincorporated community
- Frogtown, Ohio (disambiguation)
- Frogtown, Utah, an early name for Fairfield, Utah
- Frogtown, Clarke County, Virginia, an unincorporated community in Clarke County
- Frogtown, West Virginia, an unincorporated community in Logan County
- Frogtown Creek, a stream in Georgia

== Media ==
- Hell Comes to Frogtown, a 1987 film starring Roddy Piper
- Return to Frogtown, the 1993 direct-to-video sequel to Hell Comes to Frogtown
