= Rabbitville Branch =

Stream in the American state of Missouri

Coordinates: 38°04′43″N 90°44′14″W

Rabbitville Branch is a stream in Washington County in the U.S. state of Missouri. It is a tributary of Old Mines Creek.

Rabbitville Branch takes its name from the nearby community of Rabbitville, Missouri.

== See also ==
- List of rivers of Missouri
