= Cyclone Hollow =

Valley in Missouri, United States

Coordinates: 38.1744940°N 90.9587481°W

Cyclone Hollow is a valley in Washington County in the U.S. state of Missouri.

Cyclone Hollow received its name from a cyclone (tornado) which struck the area.
