= Rabbitville =

Rabbitville may refer to a place in the United States:

- Rabbitville, Indiana, an unincorporated community
- Rabbitville, Missouri, an unincorporated community
