= Cruise Mill, Missouri =

Unincorporated community in Missouri, U.S.

Coordinates: 38°04′57″N 90°43′58″W

Cruise Mill is an unincorporated community in northeast Washington County, in the U.S. state of Missouri. The community was on Old Mines Creek and just north of Missouri Route 21 and east of the intersection of routes 21 and 47. Washington State Park is one mile to the east on route 21.

== History ==
A post office called "Cruise" was established in 1882, and remained in operation until 1941. The community has the name of Cruise Higginbotham, the proprietor of a local gristmill.
