= Rabbitville, Missouri =

Unincorporated community in Missouri, U.S.

Coordinates: 38°04′19″N 90°44′19″W

Rabbitville is an unincorporated community in Washington County, in the U.S. state of Missouri. The community was adjacent to the south side of the intersection of Missouri routes 21 and 47 between Cruise Mill to the northeast and the Cruise School to the southwest. Old Mines Creek flows past along the north side of the intersection of routes 21 and 47.

The community was named for the abundance of rabbits near the original town site.
