= Frogtown, Missouri =

Unincorporated community in Missouri, U.S.

Coordinates: 37°58′47″N 90°45′59″W

Frogtown is an unincorporated community in Washington County, in the U.S. state of Missouri. The community was located 1.5 miles south of Old Mines along Missouri Route 21, north of Potosi.

The community was named for the frogs at a wetland near the original town site.
