= Happy Hollow =

Happy Hollow may refer to:

== Places ==
Canada

- Happy Hollow, Alberta
- Happy Hollow, Ontario

United States

- Happy Hollow, Falmouth, Kentucky, a former segregated black district; the location of Elzey Hughes House
- Happy Hollow, Missouri, an unincorporated community
- Dundee-Happy Hollow Historic District, a neighborhood in Omaha, Nebraska
- Happy Hollow Farm, in Fayetteville, Arkansas
- Happy Hollow Park & Zoo, in San Jose, California
- Happy Hollow Historic Site in Prattville, Alabama

== Music ==
- Happy Hollow (album), the fifth album by the American indie rock band Cursive
