= Chambo Ridge =

Ridge in Missouri, U.S.

Coordinates: 38°01′51″N 90°50′24″W

Chambo Ridge is a ridge in Washington County in the U.S. state of Missouri.

Chambo Ridge has the name of a businessman in the local charcoal industry.
