= Shibboleth (disambiguation) =

A shibboleth is any distinguishing practice that is indicative of one's social or regional origin.

Shibboleth or Shiboleth may also refer to:

== Arts and entertainment ==
- Shibboleth (artwork), a 2007 artwork by Doris Salcedo
- "Shibboleth" (Law & Order: Criminal Intent), an episode of Law & Order: Criminal Intent
- "Shibboleth" (The West Wing), an episode of The West Wing

== Computing ==
- Shibboleth Single Sign-on architecture, a trusted computing architecture for single sign-on

== Places ==
- Shibboleth, Israel, a community in the Lower Galilee near Beit Rimon
- Shibboleth, Missouri, a community in the United States

== See also ==
- Sibbolet funeral inscription, Punic inscription on the grave of a Carthaginian woman named Sibbolet
