= Ring Hollow =

Valley in Missouri, United States

Coordinates: 38.156994°N 90.950414°W

Ring Hollow is a valley in Washington County in the U.S. state of Missouri.

Ring Hollow has the name of a pioneer citizen.
