= Kingston Township, Washington County, Missouri =

Township in Missouri, United States

Coordinates: 38.0872°N 90.7356°W

Kingston Township is an inactive township in Washington County, in the U.S. state of Missouri.

"Kingston" was a variant name of the community of Bliss.
