= Robidoux Branch =

Stream in the American state of Missouri

Robidoux Branch is a stream in Washington County, Missouri. It is a tributary of Old Mines Creek.

Source coordinates are: 38°02′47″N 90°46′44″W and the coordinates of the confluence are: 38°03′14″N 90°45′31″W.

Robidoux Branch, historically spelled "Roubidoux Branch", has the name of a pioneer citizen.

== See also ==
- List of rivers of Missouri
