= Joseph Médard Carrière =

Franco-Ontarian French-language scholar

Joseph Médard Carrière (1902–1970), was an award-winning Franco-Ontarian French-language scholar. He was most noted as a collector of French folklore from the Midwest of the United States.

He also served as a President of the American Folklore Society.

== Early years and education ==
Carrière was born in Curran, Ontario in 1902. He attended Laval University, Marquette University, the Sorbonne, Paris, He graduated with a MA (1926) and Ph.D. (1932) from Harvard University.

== Academic career ==
Carrière taught at Northwestern University, where in 1936 he became a naturalized American citizen. In 1942 he moved to the University of Virginia, where he remained for the rest of his academic career.

== Research ==
From 1934 to 1936 Carrière made a series of research trips to Old Mines, Missouri, where he collected folksongs and tales from 600 French-speaking families. The majority of the folktales he collected, were told by a French-speaking barite miner called Joseph Ben Coleman.

Based on his research, Carrière published Tales from the French folk-lore of Missouri (1937). The book rendered the tales in Creole dialect, and analyzed them by Aarne tale type and motif. In 1981, the tales were republished by Rosemary Hyde Thomas, with English translations.

An edition of Carrière French transcription work, which cites the storytelling of Joseph Groulx, of Tecumseh, was published in 2005.

== Honours ==
Carrière was a member of the American Folklore Society and served as the Society's president from 1946 to 1947.

Carrière was awarded a Medal de L’Academie Française in 1948 and he received the French title of Chevalier de la Legion d’Honneur in 1950.

Carrière's papers are kept in the archives of Université Laval.

== Selected publications ==
Fucilla, Joseph G; Carrière, Joseph Médard (1935). D'Annunzio abroad: a bibliographical essay. New York: Columbia University. OCLC 637029505.

Carrière, Joseph Médard (1937). Tales from the French folk-lore of Missouri Northwestern University Studies in the Humanities, No. 1. Evanston: Northwestern University.

Carrière, J.-M. (1937). "Indian and Creole Barboka, American Barbecue". Language. 13 (2): 148–150. doi:10.2307/408723. ISSN 0097-8507.

Fucilla, Joseph Guerin; Carrière, Joseph Médard (1938). Italian criticism of Russian literature. Columbus: H.L. Hedrick. OCLC 977099177.

Carrière, J.-M. (1939). "Creole Dialect of Missouri". American Speech. 14 (2): 109–119. doi:10.2307/451217. ISSN 0003-1283.

Hocking, Elton; Carrière, Joseph Médard (1940). Transition to reading and writing French. New York: Rinehart & Co. OCLC 19870536.

Carrière, J.-M. (1941). "The Phonology of Missouri French: A Historical Study". The French Review. 14 (5): 410–415. ISSN 0016-111X.

Carrière, J.-M. (1941). "The Phonology of Missouri French: A Historical Study (Continued)". The French Review. 14 (6): 510–515. ISSN 0016-111X.

Claudel, Calvin; Carrière, J.-M. (1943). "Three Tales from the French Folklore of Louisiana". The Journal of American Folklore. 56 (219): 38–44. doi:10.2307/535913. ISSN 0021-8715.

Carrière, Joseph Médard (1960). "Early Examples of the Expressions ``American Language and ``Langue Américaine". Modern Language Notes. 75 (6): 485–488. doi:10.2307/3040333. ISSN 0149-6611.

== See also ==
- Franco-Ontarian#Literature
- Missouri French
