= Scrap Branch =

Stream in Washington County, Missouri, U.S.

Coordinates: 37.854213°N 91.014578°W

Scrap Branch is a stream in Washington County in the U.S. state of Missouri.

Scrap Branch was so named because the "scrapping" of mining ores occurred near its course.

== See also ==
- List of rivers of Missouri
