= Robidoux, Missouri =

Unincorporated community in Missouri, U.S.

Coordinates: 38°03′08″N 90°46′06″W

Robidoux is an unincorporated community in Washington County, in the U.S. state of Missouri.

The community takes its name from nearby Robidoux Branch.
