= Taggett Branch =

Stream in the American state of Missouri

Coordinates: 38.139496°N 90.759853°W

Taggett Branch is a stream in Washington County in the U.S. state of Missouri. It is a tributary of Calico Creek.

Taggett Branch has the name of the local Taggett family.

== See also ==
- List of rivers of Missouri
