= Happy Hollow, Missouri =

Unincorporated community in Missouri, U.S.

Coordinates: 38°00′05″N 90°43′30″W

Happy Hollow is an unincorporated community in eastern Washington County, in the U.S. state of Missouri. The community is located on Missouri Route 47 between Old Mines to the west and Cadet to the east.

The name "Happy Hollow" is commendatory.
