= Belleview Township, Washington County, Missouri =

Inactive township in the US state of Missouri

Coordinates: 37.7658344°N 90.7480333°W

Belleview Township is an inactive township in Washington County, in the U.S. state of Missouri.

Belleview Township was first called "Bellevue Township", and under the latter name was erected in the 1810s.
