= Murder in the Afternoon =

Murder in the Afternoon may refer to:

- "Murder in the Afternoon" (Murder, She Wrote), a 1985 television episode
- Murder in the Afternoon, a 2011 Kate Shackleton novel by Frances Brody
- Murder in the Afternoon, a novel by Ella Jo Sadler based on a 1959 crime in Quaker, Missouri
