= Hulsey =

Hulsey may refer to:

- Corey Hulsey (born 1977), American football guard for the Detroit Lions of the National Football League
- Hulsey Lake, located at 2630 m on the Apache-Sitgreaves National Forests
- William Hulsey (1838–1909), American attorney, soldier, and politician who served as Mayor of Atlanta, Georgia

== See also ==
- Hulsey, Missouri
