= Arnault Branch =

Stream in Missouri, U.S.

Coordinates: 38°1′54.7″N 90°48′35.1″W

Arnault Branch is a stream in Washington County, Missouri. It is a tributary of Mineral Fork.

Arnault Branch derives its name from Philippe Francois Renault, an early businessperson in the local lead-mining industry. A variant name is "Arnault Creek".

== See also ==
- List of rivers of Missouri
