= Mud Town, Missouri =

Extinct hamlet in Missouri, U.S.

Coordinates: 38°01′10″N 90°44′22″W

Mud Town is an extinct town in Washington County, in the U.S. state of Missouri. The GNIS classifies it as a populated place.

The community was so named on account of the often muddy condition of the original town site.
