= Peoria, Missouri =

Unincorporated community in Missouri, U.S.

Coordinates: 37°45′22″N 90°53′03″W

Peoria is an unincorporated community in southern Washington County, in the U.S. state of Missouri. The community is on Missouri Route JJ approximately three miles southwest of Belgrade. The Washington-Iron county line is 1.5 miles south of the community. Big River flows past the community.

== History ==
A post office called Peoria was established in 1908, and remained in operation until 1934. The community's name, which was one of several choices offered by postal officials, most likely is a transfer from Peoria, Illinois.
