= Bolton Hollow =

Valley in Missouri, United States

Coordinates: 38.1567162°N 90.9451364°W

Bolton Hollow is a valley in Washington County in the U.S. state of Missouri.

Bolton Hollow has the name of a pioneer prospector.
