= Bootleg Access =

Public riverside in Missouri, U.S.

- IUCN category V (protected landscape/seascape)
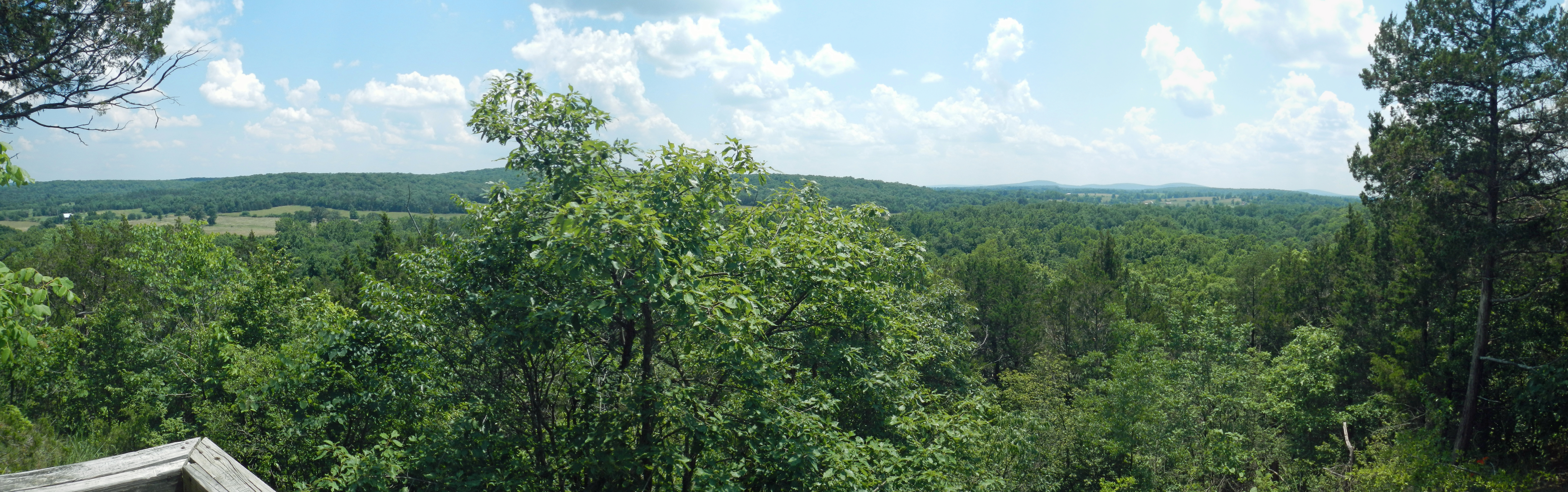
- View from the overlook

- Location within Missouri
- Location: Washington County, Missouri, United States
- Nearest city: Potosi, MO
- Coordinates: 37.816197°N 90.764928°W
- Area: 303 acres (1.2 km^{2})
- Governing body: Missouri Department of Conservation
- Website: Official website

Bootleg Access comprises 303 acres (1.23 km^{2}) in Washington County, Missouri about 10 miles (16 km) south of Potosi. Owned and managed by the Missouri Department of Conservation; it provides entry to the Big River along Missouri Route 21. There is a 1.5 mi (2.4 km) trail, three parking lots, viewing deck, and three campsites in the area.
