= Richwoods Township, Washington County, Missouri =

Township in Washington County, Missouri, U.S.

Coordinates: 38.1322°N 90.8517°W

Richwoods Township is an inactive township in Washington County, in the U.S. state of Missouri. Richwoods Township was erected in 1852, taking its name from Richwoods, Missouri.
