= Belgrade Township =

Belgrade Township may refer to the following townships in the United States:

- Belgrade Township, Nicollet County, Minnesota
- Belgrade Township, Washington County, Missouri

== See also ==
- Belgrade (disambiguation)
