= Latty, Missouri =

Unincorporated community in Missouri, U.S.

Coordinates: 37°59′16″N 90°51′02″W

Latty is an unincorporated community in Washington County, in the U.S. state of Missouri. The community is on Missouri Route 185 approximately 4.5 miles northwest of Potosi.

== History ==
A post office called Latty was established in 1894, and remained in operation until 1919. The community has the name of Latty Higginbotham, a woman in the neighborhood.
