= Floyd, Washington County, Missouri =

Unincorporated community in Missouri, U.S.

Coordinates: 37°57′15″N 90°56′55″W

Floyd is an unincorporated community in Washington County, in the U.S. state of Missouri.

== History ==
A post office called Floyd was established in 1893, and remained in operation until 1932. The name "Floyd" was suggested by postal officials, and has no local significance.
