= Belgrade Township, Washington County, Missouri =

Inactive township in the US state of Missouri

Coordinates: 37.7981°N 90.8700°W

Belgrade Township is an inactive township in Washington County, in the U.S. state of Missouri.

Belgrade Township most likely takes its name from the community of Belgrade, Missouri.
