= Missouri Route 104 =

State highway in Missouri, U.S.

Route 104
- MO 104 highlighted in red

Route information
- Maintained by MoDOT
- Length: 3.206 mi (5.160 km)

Major junctions
- East end: Route 21 in Washington State Park
- West end: Route 21 in Washington State Park

Location
- Country: United States
- State: Missouri

Highway system
- Missouri State Highway System; Interstate; US; State; Supplemental
| ← Route 103 | → Route 105 |

Route 104 is a short highway in Washington County, Missouri. It begins and ends at Route 21 in Washington State Park. No towns are along the route.

== Route description ==
Route 104 begins at an intersection with Route 21 in Washington State Park, heading northeast as a two-lane undivided road. The route runs through forested areas of the state park, curving north before winding to the east. The road heads south before a turn to the northeast. Route 104 makes another curve to the south and ends at another intersection with Route 21.

== Major intersections ==
The entire route is in Washington County.

| Location | mi | km | Destinations | Notes |
|---|---|---|---|---|
| Washington State Park | 0.000 | 0.000 | Route 21 | |
| Washington State Park | 1.379 | 2.219 | Dugout Road | |
| Washington State Park | 3.206 | 5.160 | Route 21 | |
1.000 mi = 1.609 km; 1.000 km = 0.621 mi
