= Harmony Township, Washington County, Missouri =

Township in Washington County, Missouri, U.S.

Coordinates: 37.8089°N 91.0158°W

Harmony Township is an inactive township in Washington County, in the U.S. state of Missouri.

Harmony Township was erected in 1852.
