= Northcut, Missouri =

Unincorporated community in Missouri, U.S.

Coordinates: 38°07′21″N 90°57′58″W

Northcut is an unincorporated community in Washington County, in the U.S. state of Missouri.

== History ==
A variant spelling was "Northcutt". A post office called Northcutt was established in 1912, and remained in operation until 1941. The community has the name of the local Northcutt family.
