= Racola, Missouri =

Unincorporated community in Missouri, U.S.

Coordinates: 38°01′57″N 90°45′24″W

Racola is an unincorporated community in Washington County, Missouri, United States.

== History ==
A post office called Racola was established in 1898, and remained in operation until 1930. The community has the middle name of John Racola Coleman, the original owner of the site.
