= Delbridge, Missouri =

Unincorporated community in Missouri, U.S.

Coordinates: 37°47′41″N 90°59′12″W

Delbridge is an unincorporated community in southwest Washington County, in the U.S. state of Missouri. The community is on Missouri Route C seven miles west of Belgrade.

== History ==
A post office called Delbridge was established in 1928, and remained in operation until 1934. The community has the name of Charles L. Delbridge, the original owner of the town site. Delbridge was a book publisher who believed that the nation had too many laws, courts and lawyers. He bought the land c. 1925 and built the houses and rented them to people who agreed to live by the Golden Rule. Initially there was no local government.
