= Horton Town, Missouri =

Unincorporated community in Missouri, U.S.

Coordinates: 37°46′35″N 90°55′30″W

Horton Town is an unincorporated community in Washington County, in the U.S. state of Missouri.

The community has the name of the Horton family, original owners of the site.
