= Tiff, Missouri =

Tiff
- Unincorporated community
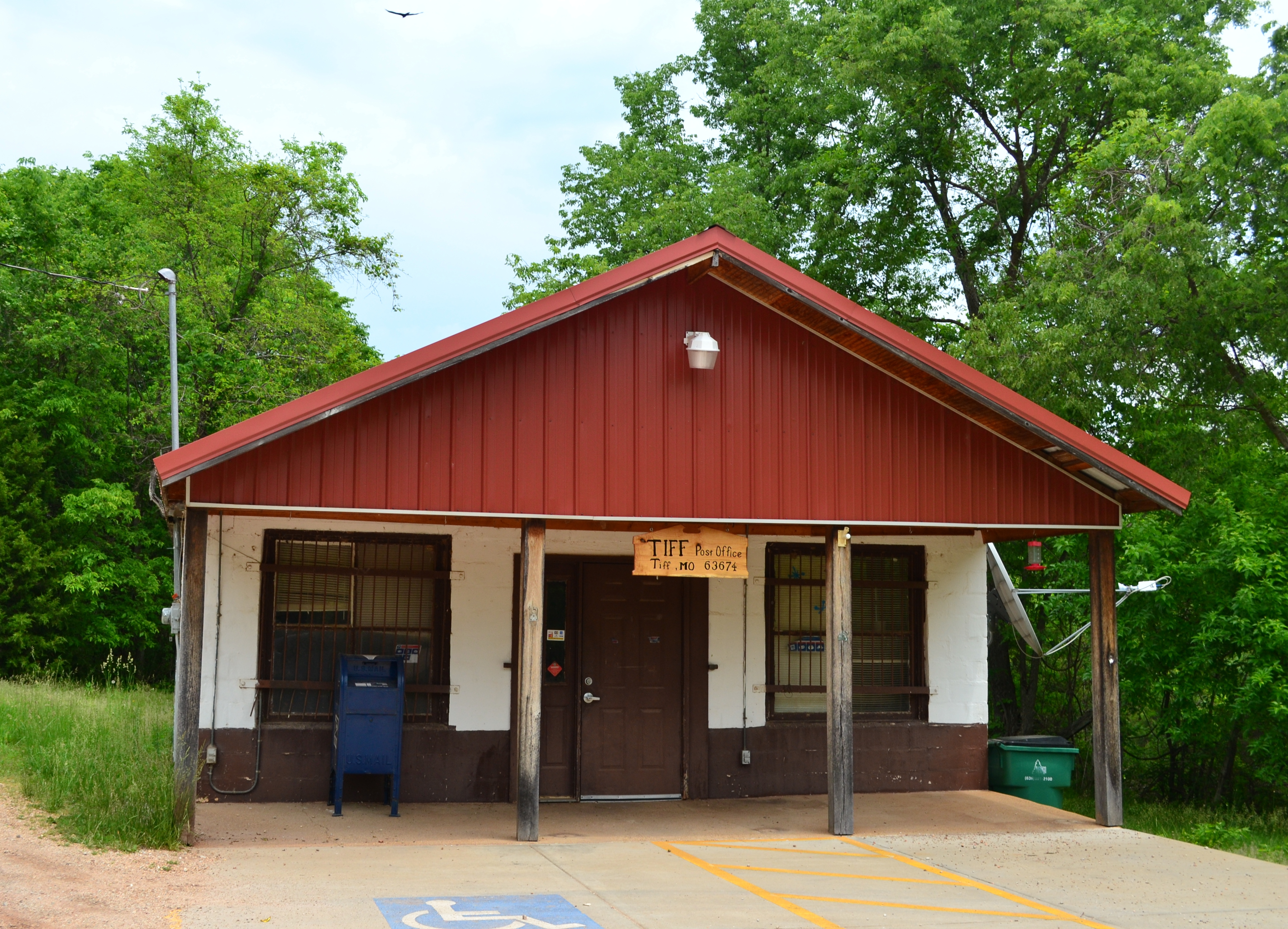
- Tiff post office

- Location within Missouri Location within the United States
- Coordinates: 38°01′09″N 90°39′10″W
- Country: United States
- State: Missouri
- Elevation: 659 ft (201 m)
- Postal code: 63674
- GNIS feature ID: 727649

Tiff is an unincorporated community in eastern Washington County, Missouri, United States. It is located approximately eight miles northeast of Potosi. The community was named for the barite ore found here, also known as "tiff". The community was founded as a company town in the early 1900s by John Cambel to house miners for his South East Missouri Barytes Company. A post office called Tiff has been in operation since 1905.

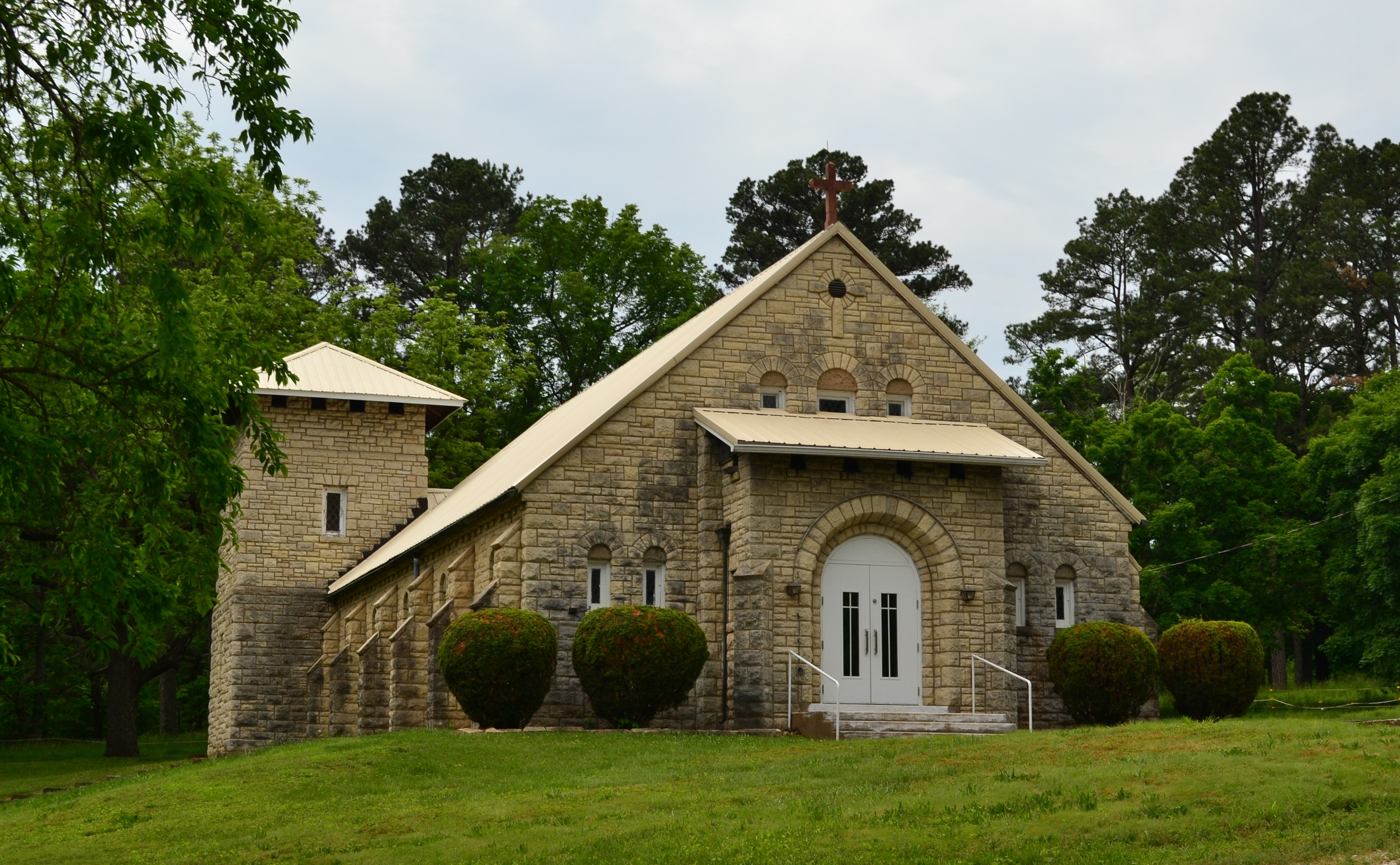
St. Joseph Catholic Church in Tiff, Missouri
