= Levy, Missouri =

Unincorporated community in Missouri, U.S.

Coordinates: 37°54′48″N 90°56′42″W

Levy is an unincorporated community in Washington County, in the U.S. state of Missouri.

== History ==
A post office called Levy was established in 1889, and remained in operation until 1908. The identity of the namesake of Levy has been forgotten.
