= Maryden, Missouri =

Unincorporated community in Missouri, U.S.

Coordinates: 37.796439°N 90.662627°W

Maryden is an unincorporated community in Washington County, in the U.S. state of Missouri.

== History ==
A post office called Maryden was established in 1898, and remained in operation until 1903. Annette Mary Denby, an early postmaster, named the place after herself using parts of her middle and last names. A variant name was "Hickory Grove". The community once had Hickory Grove Schoolhouse, now defunct.
