= Quaker, Missouri =

Unincorporated community in Missouri, U.S.

Coordinates: 37°46′52″N 91°00′07″W

Quaker is an unincorporated community in southwestern Washington County, in the U.S. state of Missouri. Quaker is located on Missouri Route C, between Courtois to the southwest and Delbridge to the northeast. The area is within the Mark Twain National Forest and the Hazel Creek Recreation Area, along with a section of the Ozark Trail lie approximately four miles to the north.

== History ==
A post office called Quaker was established in 1894, and remained in operation until 1954. An early postmaster selected the name "Quaker" because this name was unique among post offices in Missouri.

In 1959, Quaker was the site of a brutal murder which became the subject of Ella Jo Sadler's novel, Murder in the Afternoon.
