= Joseph Groulx =

Franco-Ontarian storyteller

Joseph Groulx (c.1884 – ?), was a Franco-Ontarian storyteller from Tecumseh, Ontario, an area of Southwestern Ontario with a small, French-speaking minority.

== Claimed significance of Groulx's work ==
In 1940, he reportedly assisted a French-language scholar, Joseph Médard Carrière, in transcribing French stories, which were added to a university folklore database and eventually published in Donald Deschênes and Marcel Bénéteau's Contes du Détroit (Prise de parole, 2005), which won the Prix Mnémo in 2006.

Groulx's stories are said to be particularly significant for the fact that they testify to the survival into the 20th century of a French-language storytelling tradition in the Windsor/Detroit area.

== Ongoing research efforts into Groulx's work ==
Deschênes and Bénéteau point out, however, that an element of obscurity surrounds the reported work of Groulx with his transcriber Carrière: there was little evidence that Carrière ever spent any significant time in the Detroit area; the surviving daughter of Groulx was reported to have denied any knowledge of her father's French storytelling activities, and Carrière was recorded only to have claimed Groulx as his main source 25 years after the time of his purported transcriptions, and subsequently omitted, when requested, to supply the archivist at the Université Laval, where his papers were stored, with his sources' basic biographical details.

It is assumed that the death of Carrière in 1970 significantly diminished the possibility of ongoing research efforts shedding light on the nature of Groulx's (or another person's) French storytelling.

=== Possible link with Paul Martin Sr ===
Deschênes and Bénéteau record the suggestion by Madame Carrière that her late husband's work on the French storytelling tradition in the Windsor/Detroit area, for which Groulx was claimed as his chief source, was carried out at the significant encouragement of a fellow Franco-Ontarian, politician and diplomat Paul Martin, Sr.

== See also ==
- Franco-Ontarian#Literature
