= Cannon Mines, Missouri =

Unincorporated community in Missouri, U.S.

Coordinates: 38°03′12″N 90°41′53″W

Cannon Mines is an unincorporated community in Washington County, in the U.S. state of Missouri.

== History ==
A post office called Cannon Mines was established in 1915, and remained in operation until 1940. The community most likely was named after the proprietor of a local lead mine.
