= Theabeau Town, Missouri =

Unincorporated community in Missouri, U.S.

Coordinates: 38°01′58″N 90°43′42″W

Thebeau Town is an unincorporated community in Washington County, in the U.S. state of Missouri.

The community has the name of the local Thebeau family.
