= Sunlight, Missouri =

Unincorporated community in Missouri, U.S.

Coordinates: 37°46′54″N 90°54′18″W

Sunlight is an unincorporated community in Washington County, in the U.S. state of Missouri.

== History ==
A post office called Sunlight was established in 1885, and remained in operation until 1927. It is unknown why the name "Sunlight" was applied to this community.
