= Johnson Township, Washington County, Missouri =

Township in Washington County, Missouri, U.S.

Coordinates: 38.0961°N 91.0214°W

Johnson Township is an inactive township in Washington County, in the U.S. state of Missouri.

Johnson Township was erected in 1852, and most likely was named after a pioneer citizen.
