= Baryties, Missouri =

Unincorporated community in Missouri, U.S.

Coordinates: 38°03′43″N 90°39′30″W

Baryties is an unincorporated community in Washington County, in the U.S. state of Missouri.

== History ==
A post office called Baryties was established in 1893, and remained in operation until 1931. The community was so named on account of deposits of barytes in the area.
