= Fountain Farm, Missouri =

Extinct hamlet in Missouri, U.S.

Coordinates: 37°58′40″N 90°43′07″W

Fountain Farm is an extinct town in Washington County, in the U.S. state of Missouri.

Fountain Farm was named for a spring near the rural town site.
