= French Town, Missouri =

Unincorporated community in Missouri, U.S.

Coordinates: 37°57′18″N 90°40′28″W

French Town is an unincorporated community in Washington County, in the U.S. state of Missouri.

French Town was named for the fact a large share of the early settlers were of French descent.
