= Hurricane, Washington County, Missouri =

Unincorporated community in Missouri, U.S.

Coordinates: 38°10′52″N 90°49′31″W

Hurricane is an unincorporated community in Washington County, in the U.S. state of Missouri.

It is unknown why the name "Hurricane" was applied to this community.
