= Concord Township, Washington County, Missouri =

Inactive township in the US state of Missouri

Coordinates: 37.8247°N 90.7103°W

Concord Township is an inactive township in Washington County, in the U.S. state of Missouri.

Concord Township was erected in 1852.
