= Walton Township, Washington County, Missouri =

Inactive township in the US state of Missouri

Coordinates: 37.9111°N 90.9867°W

Walton Township is an inactive township in Washington County, in the U.S. state of Missouri.

Walton Township may have the name of Joseph H. Walton, an early settler.
