= Breton Township, Washington County, Missouri =

Inactive township in the US state of Missouri

Coordinates: 37.9213085°N 90.7567954°W

Breton Township is an inactive township in Washington County, in the U.S. state of Missouri.

Breton Township was erected in 1813, taking its name from an extinct community of the same name within its borders.
