= Union Township, Washington County, Missouri =

Township in Washington County, Missouri, U.S.

Coordinates: 38.0297°N 90.7175°W

Union Township is an inactive township in Washington County, in the U.S. state of Missouri.

Union Township was erected in 1852.
