= Cadet, Missouri =

- Unincorporated community
- Location of Cadet, Missouri
- Coordinates: 37°59′15″N 90°41′18″W
- Country: United States
- State: Missouri
- County: Washington
- Elevation: 801 ft (244 m)
- Time zone: UTC-6 (Central (CST))
  - Summer (DST): UTC-5 (CDT)
- ZIP code: 63630
- Area code: 573

Cadet is an unincorporated community in Union Township in eastern Washington County, Missouri, United States. Cadet is located on Missouri Route 47 between Old Mines to the west and Bonne Terre to the southeast. The village is approximately 6 miles (10 km) northeast of Potosi.

== History ==
Cadet is situated in the middle of the old lead and barite mining region of Washington County, and is said to have had the last log and ash furnace in the area, still in use in 1864. Cadet had its start when the railroad was extended to that point. A post office called Cadet has been in operation since 1859. It is unknown why the name "Cadet" was applied to this community.

The town had a population of about 500 when it was struck by a historic tornado, three quarters of a mile wide, which leveled most of the buildings on April 14, 1911. Including the residents of the surrounding farms, about 3,000 people were left homeless, 12 injured and four dead.
