= Ebo, Missouri =

Unincorporated community in Missouri, U.S.

Coordinates: 38.026°N 90.899°W

Ebo is an unincorporated community in Washington County, Missouri, United States. It is located approximately 8 miles (13 km) northwest of Potosi on Route 185. Ebo is next to Ebo Creek, the etymology of which is unknown.

Ebo is mentioned as being one of the possible sites of Renault's earliest lead mining in Missouri. The community once had Ebo Schoolhouse, now defunct.
