= Belgrade, KwaZulu-Natal =

Belgrade Nsiligwane
- Location within KwaZulu-Natal Location within South Africa
- Coordinates: 27.266°S 31.275°E
- Country: South Africa
- Province: KwaZulu-Natal
- District: Zululand
- Municipality: uPhongolo

Government
  - Mrs: Twister Mavimbela (ANC)

Area
  - Total: 22.27 km^{2} (8.60 sq mi)

Population (2011)
  - Total: 7,404
  - Density: 332.5/km^{2} (861.1/sq mi)

Racial makeup (2011)
  - Black African: 99.4%
  - Coloured: 0%
  - Indian/Asian: 0.1%
  - White: 0%
  - Other: 0%

First languages (2011)
  - Zulu: 95.3%
  - S. Ndebele: 1.4%
  - English: 1.0%
  - Other: 2.4%
- Time zone: UTC+2 (SAST)

Belgrade is a town in Zululand District Municipality in the KwaZulu-Natal province of South Africa.It is located in the North of KwaZulu-Natal and it is a Perfect place for agricultural practices. It consists of 6 sections with an increasing informal settlement throughout the community.
