= Aptus, Missouri =

Unincorporated community in Missouri, U.S.

Coordinates: 38°02′25″N 90°50′54″W

Aptus is an unincorporated community in Washington County, in the U.S. state of Missouri. The community is located approximately eight miles northwest of Potosi on Missouri Route F just north of the confluence of Rogue Creek with Mineral Fork.

== History ==
A post office called Aptus was established in 1890, and remained in operation until 1915. It is unknown why the name "Aptus" was applied to this community.

In 1925, Aptus had 33 inhabitants.
