= Hulsey, Missouri =

Unincorporated community in Missouri, US

Coordinates: 38°10′49″N 91°02′13″W

Hulsey is an unincorporated community in Washington County, in the U.S. state of Missouri.

== History ==
A post office called Hulsey was established in 1890, and remained in operation until 1916. The community has the name of an early citizen.
