= Frogtown, Ohio =

Frogtown, Ohio may refer to:

- Cassella, Ohio, also known as "Frogtown"
- Pickrelltown, Ohio, also known as "Frogtown"
- Toledo, Ohio, also known as "Frogtown"
