= Bliss, Missouri =

Unincorporated community in Missouri, U.S.

Coordinates: 38°05′35″N 90°44′25″W

Bliss is an unincorporated community in northeast Washington County, in the U.S. state of Missouri. The community is on Mineral Fork adjacent to Missouri Route 47.

== History ==
Bliss was first named "Kingston Furnace", and under the latter name was founded in the 1870s, and named after Wyllys King, proprietor of a local blast furnace. A post office called Bliss was established in 1899, and remained in operation until 1943. The present name is after the local Bliss family.
