= Shibboleth, Missouri =

Unincorporated community in Missouri, U.S.

Coordinates: 38°00′20″N 90°42′19″W

Shibboleth is an unincorporated community in Washington County, in the U.S. state of Missouri.

Shibboleth had its start as a mining settlement, and was named after a term mentioned in the Hebrew Bible.
