= Old Mines Creek =

Stream in the American state of Missouri

Old Mines Creek is a stream in Washington County in the U.S. state of Missouri. It is a tributary of Mineral Fork.

The stream headwaters are at 37°58′59″N 90°46′00″W and the confluence with Mineral Fork is at 38°05′31″N 90°43′30″W.

Old Mines Creek takes its name from the nearby community of Old Mines, Missouri.

== Tributaries ==
- Rabbitville Branch

== See also ==
- List of rivers of Missouri
