= Missouri Route 21 =

State highway in Missouri, U.S.

Route 21
- Tesson Ferry Road

Route information
- Maintained by MoDOT
- Length: 188 mi (303 km)
- Existed: 1922–present

Major junctions
- South end: AR 115 at the Arkansas state line near Poynor
- US 160 in Doniphan; US 60 near Van Buren; Route 72 in Centerville; Route 49 in Hogan; Route 32 in Caledonia; Route 47 in Mineral Point; Route M / Route MM in Barnhart; Route 141 in Paulina Hills; I-270 in Concord; US 50 / US 61 / US 67 in Concord
- North end: Route 30 in Affton

Location
- Country: United States
- State: Missouri
- Counties: Ripley, Carter, Reynolds, Iron, Washington, Jefferson, St. Louis

Highway system
- Missouri State Highway System; Interstate; US; State; Supplemental
← Route 20	→ Route 22

Route 21 is a highway in eastern Missouri. Its northern terminus is at Route 30 in Affton. Its southern terminus is at the Arkansas–Missouri state line (where it continues as Highway 115). In the St. Louis area, it is known as Tesson Ferry Road, which was named after the 19th century proprietor of the ferry across the Meramec River. Route 21 from the Meramec River to Route B, along with Route M, make up the Jefferson County Scenic Byway.

Route M is a short arterial highway. It is a major east–west route which connects Route 21 to Interstate 55. For the majority of its length, Route M is a four-lane divided highway with limited access. At its junction with Interstate 55, Route M becomes an undivided two lane road until its eastern terminus at U.S. 61/US 67. Route M was rerouted to its present location in the late 1990s after traffic became too great for the original road to handle. The original route is now known as Old Route M.

== History ==
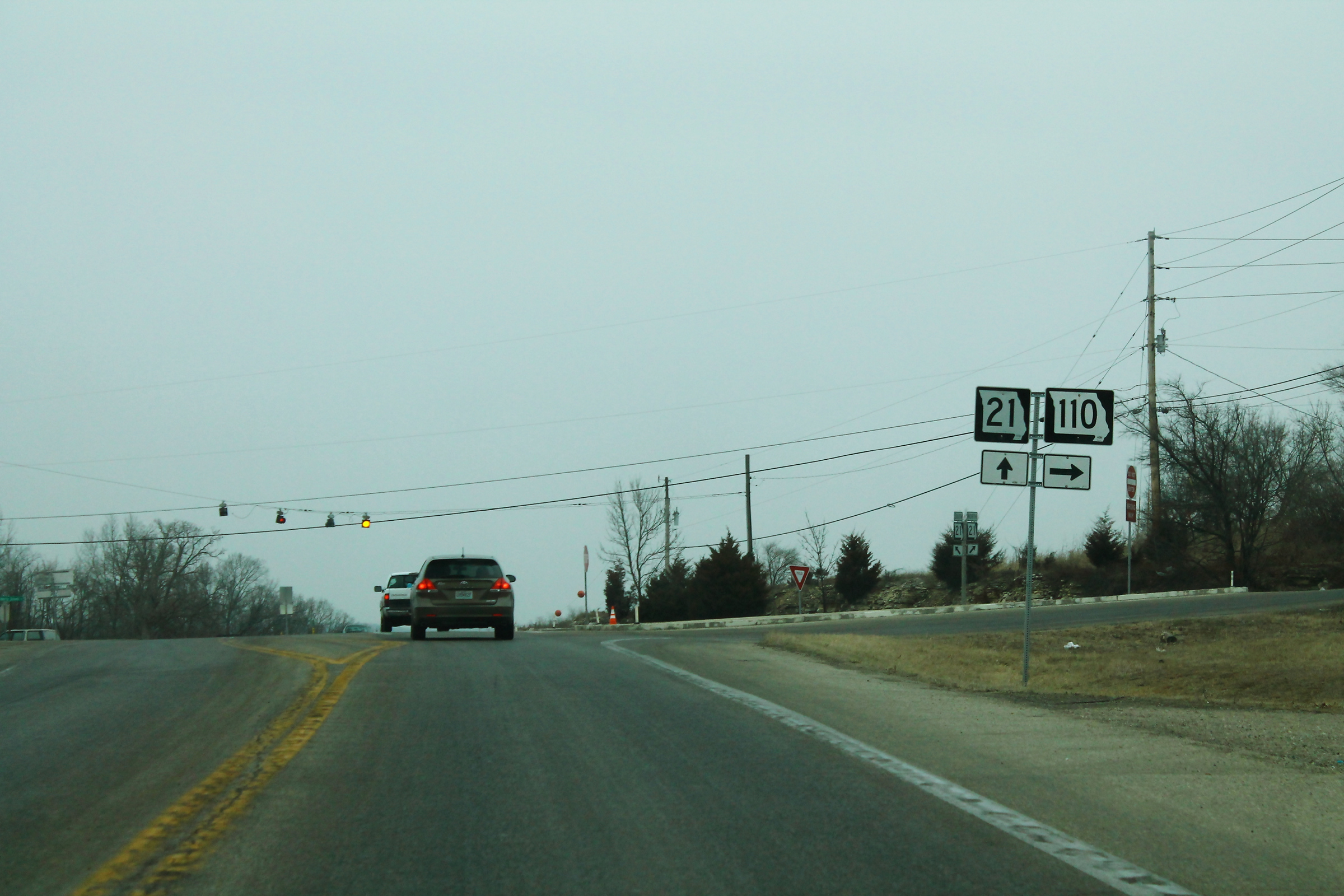
Intersection of Route 21 and Route 110 right outside of De Soto

The section through northern Jefferson County was considered dangerous. As a result, the road was rerouted and built to freeway standards. Construction to reroute the highway to just south of Hillsboro was completed on December 15, 2008, and Route 21 is currently freeway standard from Route 141 to Highway B. Plans to extend the freeway south to De Soto have been approved, but funds are lacking to complete this part of the project.

== Route description ==
Route 21 begins at the Arkansas state line, where it continues southward as Highway 115. As the highway enters Ripley County, it passes through the city of Doniphan, where it intersects US 160 and Route 142. Route 21 runs concurrently with US 160 for a short distance before separating east of Doniphan.

Continuing northward, Route 21 enters Carter County, where it meets US 60 near Van Buren. The highway briefly overlaps US 60 before diverging and heading northeast into Reynolds County. In Reynolds County, Route 21 passes through Ellington, where it intersects Route 72 and continues northward toward Iron County.

Upon reaching Iron County, Route 21 enters Arcadia and Pilot Knob, where it intersects Route 221. The highway then continues northward, passing through Washington County and reaching Potosi, where it meets Route 8. Further north, Route 21 intersects Route 47 near Old Mines before entering Jefferson County.

In Jefferson County, Route 21 passes through De Soto, where it intersects Route 110. The highway continues northward, reaching Barnhart, where it meets Route M and Route MM. As Route 21 enters the St. Louis metropolitan area, it becomes a major arterial road known as Tesson Ferry Road, and passes through Concord and intersecting I-270. The highway then reaches its northern terminus at Route 30 in Affton.

== Major intersections ==
County	Location	mi	km	Destinations	Notes
Ripley		0.000	0.000	AR 115 south – Pocahontas	Arkansas state line
Ripley		8.578	13.805	Route 142 west – Gatewood	Southern end of Route 142 overlap
Ripley		9.825	15.812	US 160 west – Alton	Southern end of US 160 overlap
Ripley	Doniphan	11.714	18.852	Route 142 east – Business District	Northern end of Route 142 overlap
Ripley		13.677	22.011	US 160 east – Poplar Bluff	Northern end of US 160 overlap
Carter		36.031	57.986	US 60 east – Poplar Bluff	Southern end of US 60 overlap
Carter		45.608	73.399	US 60 west / Route 34 begins – Van Buren	Northern end of US 60 overlap; southern end of Route 34 overlap
Reynolds		48.959	78.792	Route 34 east – Clearwater Dam, Piedmont	Northern end of Route 34 overlap
Reynolds	Ellington	65.112	104.788	Route 106 west – Owls Bend, Eminence, Business District	
Reynolds		77.088	124.061	Route 72 west – Bunker	Southern end of Route 72 overlap
Reynolds		85.027	136.838	Route 49 north – Black, Oates	Southern end of Route 49 overlap
Iron		98.252	158.121	Route 49 south – Annapolis	Northern end of Route 49 overlap
Iron	Arcadia	107.967	173.756	Route 72 east	Northern end of Route 72 overlap
Iron	Pilot Knob	110.072	177.144	Route 221 north	
Iron		119.405	192.164	Route 32 west	Southern end of Route 32 overlap
Washington	Caledonia	123.672	199.031	Route 32 east – Bismarck	Northern end of Route 32 overlap
Washington	Potosi	135.913	218.731	Route 8 – Potosi, Leadwood	
Washington	Old Mines	142.085	228.664	Route 47 south – Bonne Terre	Southern end of Route 47 overlap
Washington		147.011	236.591	Route 47 north – Richwoods	Northern end of Route 47 overlap
Washington	Washington State Park	149.523	240.634	Route 104 east	
Washington	Washington State Park	150.912	242.869	Route 104 west	
Jefferson		161.379	259.714	Route 110 east	
Jefferson	Hillsboro	165.177	265.827	Route B begins / Business 21	Southern end of Route B overlap
Jefferson		165.547	266.422	Route B north	Northern end of Route B overlap; southern end of freeway
Jefferson	Hillsboro	167.854	270.135	Route A / Business 21	
Jefferson		169.236	272.359	Hayden Road	
Jefferson		172.575	277.733	Old Route 21 - Goldman	
Jefferson		175.162	281.896	Old Route 21 / Schenk Road	
Jefferson	Otto	177.733	286.034	Route MM / Route M – House Springs, Barnhart	
Jefferson		180.341	290.231	Old Route 21 - Shady Valley	
Jefferson		184.555	297.012	Old Route 21 - Meramec Heights	Southbound exit and northbound entrance
Jefferson		185.469	298.483	Route 141 – Fenton, Arnold	Interchange; northern end of freeway
Jefferson		185.864	299.119	Meramec Bottom Road	
St. Louis	Concord	190.517	306.607	I-270 – Chicago, Memphis	I-270 exit 2
St. Louis	Concord	191.717	308.539	US 50 / US 61 / US 67 (Lindbergh Boulevard)	
St. Louis	Affton	194.126	312.416	Route 30 (Gravois Road)	
1.000 mi = 1.609 km; 1.000 km = 0.621 mi: Incomplete access

== Related routes ==
=== Hillsboro business spur ===
Route 21 Business
- Location: Hillsboro

Route 21 Business (Route 21 Bus.) follows the old alignment of Route 21 through the city of Hillsboro. It begins at the intersection of Route 21 and Route B on the southern edge of the city, and continues north to the intersection of Route A and Old Route 21, where it ends. Route 21 Bus. is the only way one can now reach Route BB, as the rerouting of Route 21 bypasses the road.

=== Route M ===
Route M
- Location: Otto–Barnhart
- Length: 7.478 mi (12.035 km)
- Existed: c. 1953–present

Route M begins as a four-lane divided highway at a diamond interchange with Route 21 near the community of Otto. West of the interchange, the highway is called Route MM. The highway heads east for less than 1/2 mile (0.80 km) where it has a partial cloverleaf interchange with the former alignment of Route 21, appropriately named Old Route 21. It continues east where there are two turn-offs which connect to nearby grade-separated highways. The first highway is the former alignment of Route M (Old Route M), the second is Old Lemay Ferry Road near the community of Antonia. Only the eastbound lanes have direct access to Old Lemay Ferry Road. Access is provided to the westbound lanes via median u-turn crossovers on either side of the intersection.

Route M continues east, where it has two at-grade intersections before entering Barnhart; one at St. Luke's Church Road and the other at Moss Hollow Road. At Barnhart, the intersection with Marriott Parkway connects Interstate 55 traffic with gas stations and retail stores. As of December 2009, the I-55 interchange was being reconstructed to better handle access to southbound I-55. East of the I-55 interchange, Route M becomes a two-lane highway and ends a mile (1.6 km) later at a T intersection with U.S. Route 61 / U.S. Route 67.

Route M, along with Route 21, make up the Jefferson County Scenic Byway.

Due to an increasing number of accidents at the intersection of Route M with Old Lemay Ferry Road, MoDOT rebuilt the intersection in 2007, with the eastbound lanes only having access to Old Lemay Ferry Road. Turnarounds built short distances east and west of the intersection allow access to and from the westbound lanes. On December 7, 2009, access to southbound I-55 was closed when MoDOT began a project to rebuild the interchange. The project was scheduled to last through the end of 2010. Southbound access to I-55 from Route M, which had featured a loop ramp, was being relocated to a new roundabout on Metropolitan Boulevard, which will also connect to a park and ride. As of 2011, the interchange is fully open. Southbound I-55 access is possible through a roundabout.

The entire route is in Jefferson County. All exits are unnumbered.

Location	mi	km	Destinations	Notes
Otto	0.000	0.000	Route MM	Continuation as Route MM
Otto	0.154– 0.171	0.248– 0.275	Route 21 – Hillsboro, St. Louis	Diamond interchange
Otto	0.541	0.871	Old Route 21	Partial cloverleaf interchange
Otto	1.323	2.129	To Old Route M	
Antonia	2.423	3.899	Old Lemay Ferry Road	Eastbound access only; westbound access via median u-turn crossovers
	4.273	6.877	St. Luke's Church Road	
	5.126	8.249	Moss Hollow Road	
Barnhart	6.372	10.255	Caitlin Road	
Barnhart	6.797– 6.815	10.939– 10.968	I-55 / Metropolitan Boulevard – Festus, St. Louis	Partial cloverleaf interchange with I-55; access to southbound I-55 is available via a roundabout; end of four-lane segment
Barnhart	7.478	12.035	US 61 / US 67	Eastern terminus
1.000 mi = 1.609 km; 1.000 km = 0.621 mi: Incomplete access

=== Connector route ===
A 0.22-mile (0.35 km) connector between Route M and Old Lemay Ferry Road exists in Jefferson County.
