= Richwoods, Missouri =

Unincorporated community in Washington County, Missouri, United States

- Unincorporated community
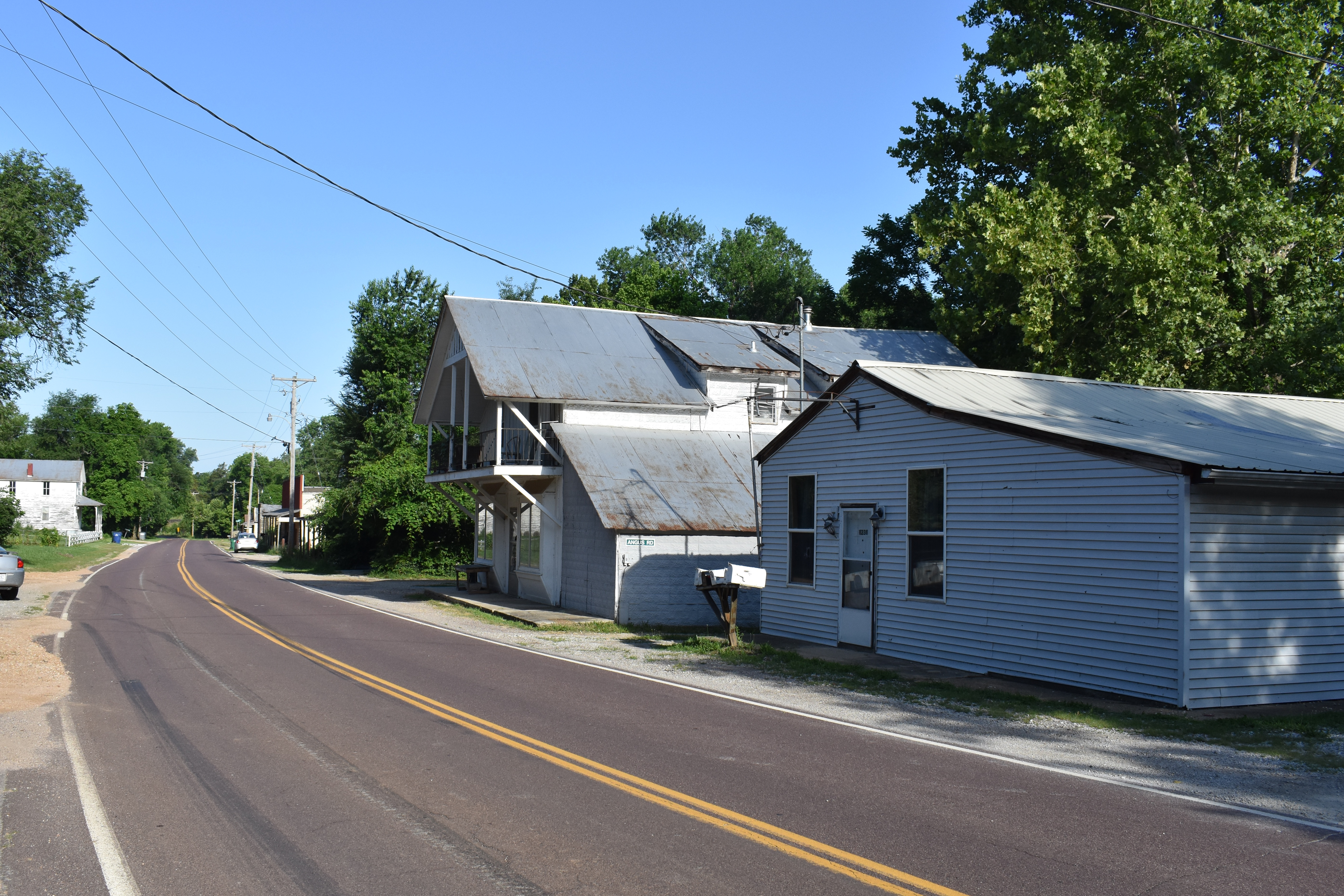
- Richwoods in June 2026

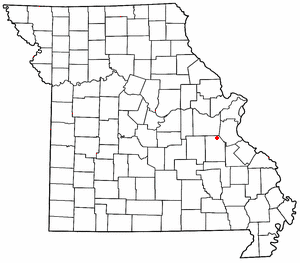
- Location of Richwoods, Missouri
- Coordinates: 38°09′37″N 90°49′41″W
- Country: United States
- State: Missouri
- County: Washington
- Settled: 1830
- Elevation: 810 ft (250 m)
- ZIP code: 63071
- Area code: 573
- GNIS feature ID: 725284

Richwoods is an unincorporated community in northeastern Washington County, Missouri, United States. It is located on Missouri Route A one mile east of Missouri Route 47, approximately 15 miles west of De Soto and 19 miles south of St. Clair.

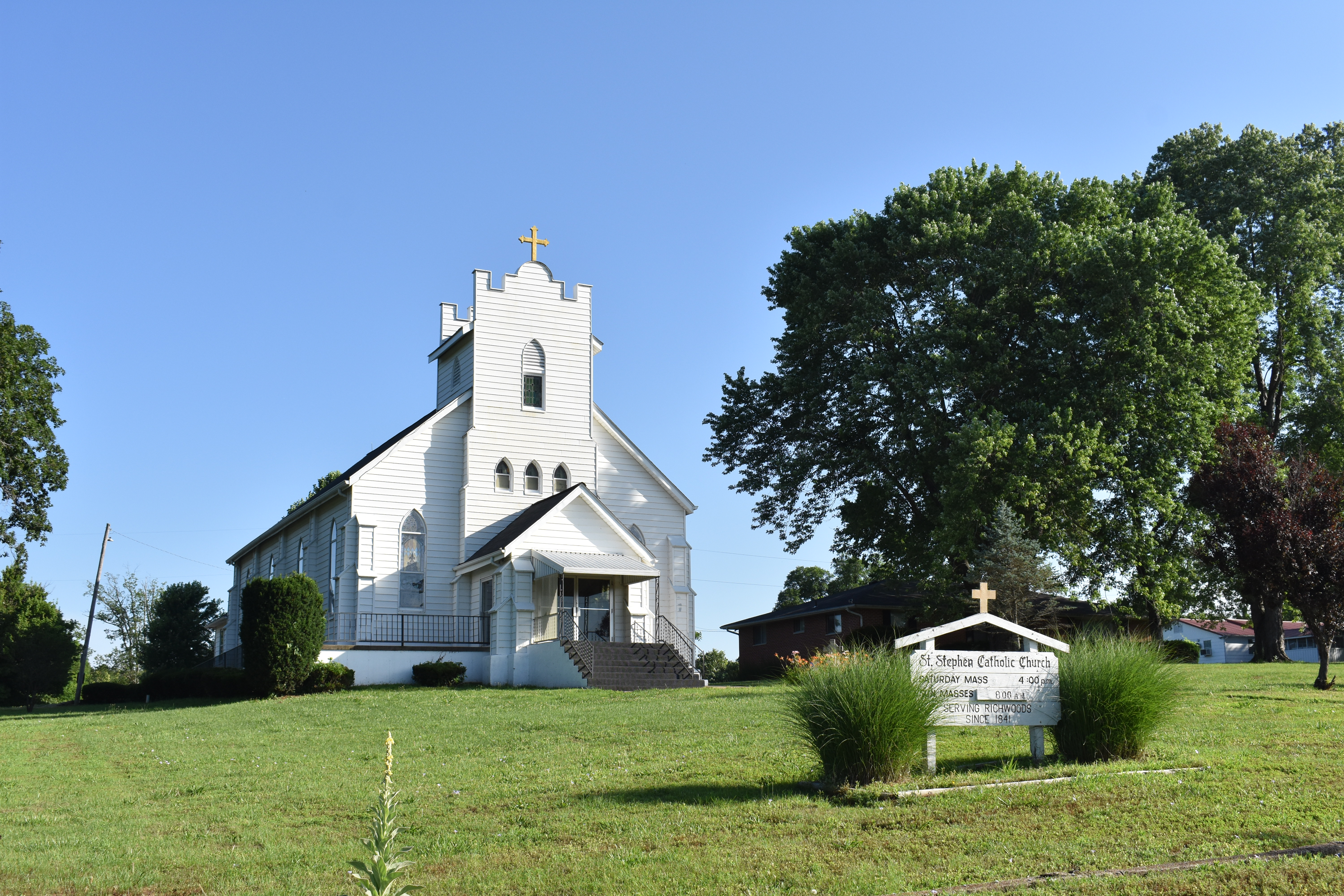
St Stephen Catholic Church

== History ==
The first settlement at Richwoods was made ca. 1830. The community was named for the dense forest near the original town site. A post office has been in operation at Richwoods since 1832.

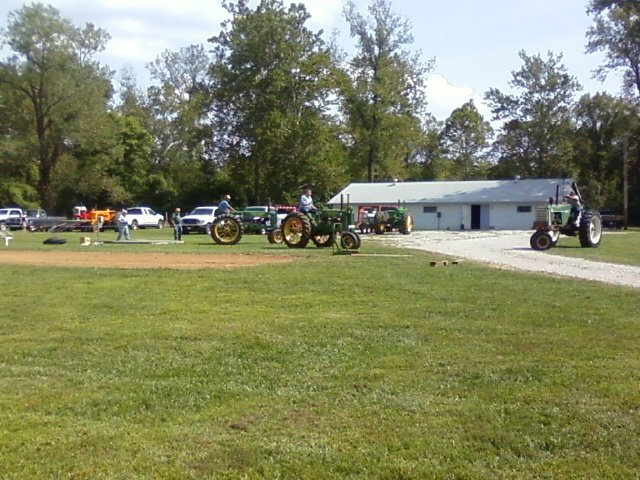
Antique Tractor Pull in Richwoods, Missouri 2009

== Education ==
The Richwoods area is served by the Richwoods School District (R-7). They offer pre-school and kindergarten through eighth grade. After the completion of the eighth grade, students may choose to attend high schools in the following areas: Potosi, Grandview, Kingston, DeSoto, St. Clair, or Sullivan.
