= Old Mines, Missouri =

Unincorporated community in Washington County, Missouri, United States

Old Mines La Vieille Mine
- Unincorporated community
- Location in Missouri Old Mines (the United States)
- Coordinates: 38°0′55″N 90°45′22″W
- Country: United States
- State: Missouri
- County: Washington, Jefferson, St. Francois
- Time zone: UTC-6 (Central(CST))
  - Summer (DST): UTC-5 (CT)

Old Mines (French: La Vieille Mine) is the name of an unincorporated community and surrounding area in southeast Washington, St. Francois, and Jefferson counties in Missouri, United States, that were settled by French colonists in the early 18th century when the area was part of the Illinois Country of New France.

== Description ==
The early settlers came to mine for lead, and their descendants still inhabit the area where, through a combination of geographic and cultural isolation, they maintained a distinctive French culture well into the 20th century. As recently as the late 1980s there may have been a thousand native speakers of the region's Missouri French dialect. This culturally distinct population has sometimes been referred to as "paw-paw French" and lives in an amorphously-defined area in Washington, Jefferson, and St. Francois counties roughly 15 miles (24 km) either side of a line from Potosi to De Soto. The community of Old Mines itself is in northeastern Washington County, six miles north of Potosi.

== Early history ==
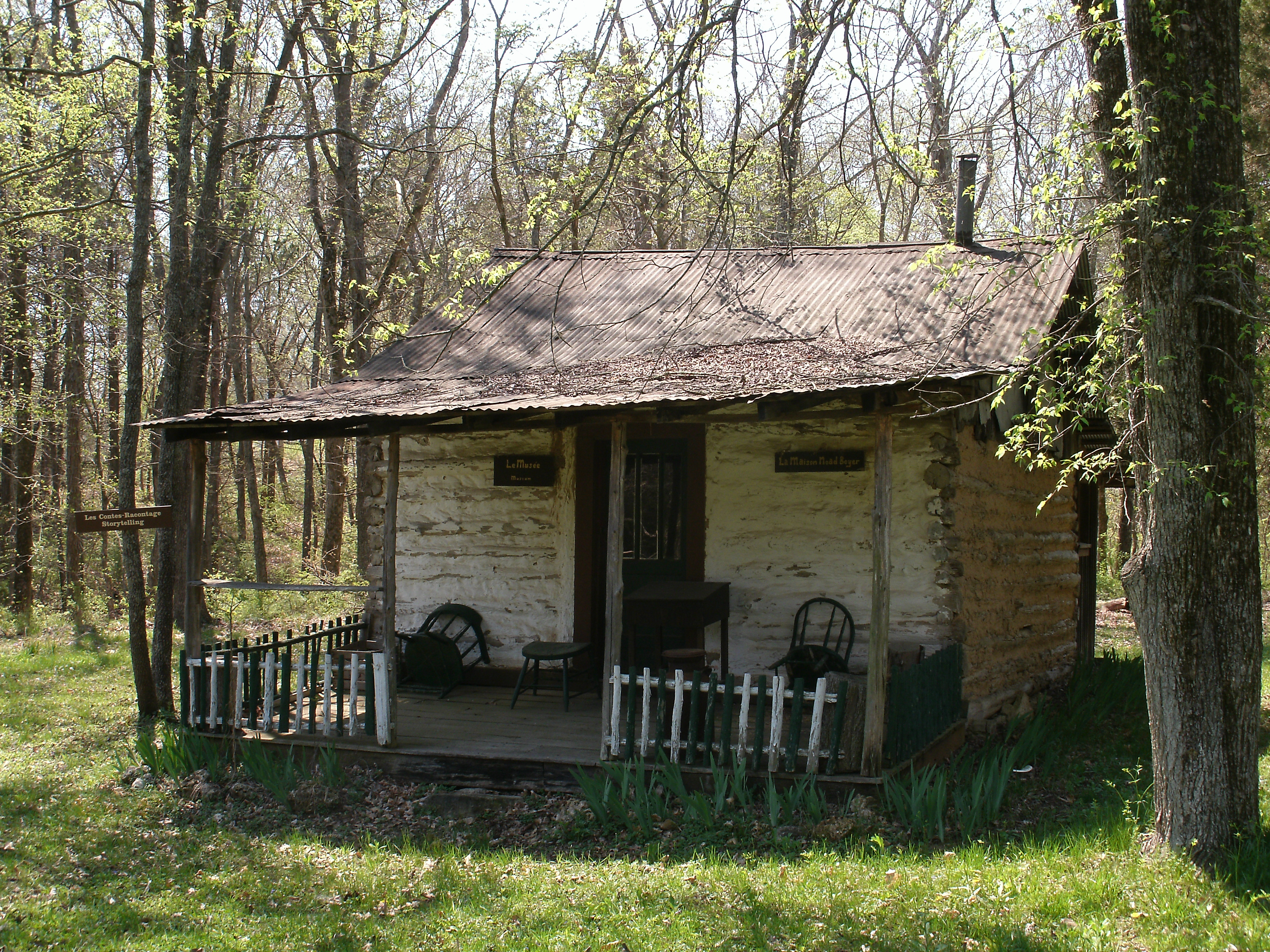
A log cabin preserved by the Old Mines Area Historical Society

The southeast Missouri lead district is the location of the earth's greatest known concentration of galena, an ore of lead. Found first in surface deposits over a wide area, and now mined deep underground, the ore was known to the native Indians of the region from whom it became known to early French explorers. Father Jacques Gravier noted in his journal in October 1700, the presence of rich lead ore twelve or thirteen leagues from the mouth of the "River Miaramigoua" (Meramec), that is 36 to 39 miles (58 to 63 km). At that time the Meramec tributary Big River was considered part of the Meramec and often called the Little Meramec (French Petit Merrimac). The distance cited on the Meramec proper would not be in an especially mineralized region, but if taken to mean the Big River, it would lead to its headwaters and possibly refer to areas on the Mineral Fork or Old Mines Creek where some of the earliest mining took place.

The French sent a series of ill-equipped mining expeditions into what is now Missouri to search for silver, which is sometimes found with lead ore. One expedition was led by Jacques sieur de Lochon, a Parisian and a smelter, and another was led by sieur La Renaudière. Neither expedition produced much to show for their efforts, although Renaudière was able to smelt some poor-quality lead. In 1720 Philippe François Renault arrived with professional miners. Renault found and successfully worked large quantities of lead on the "Merameg" in what is now the Old Mines region. Renault received a grant in 1723 for one and a half leagues along the Petit Merrimac and extending up the first tributary (la première branche) six leagues for a total of 9 square leagues. The exact location of Renault's grant and mines is not known, but the "first branch" could be Fourche à Renault Creek, with the mines perhaps at Ebo, or it could be Old Mines Creek with the mines at Old Mines itself. Renault's mines were worked until the 1730s, were closed for some years, and reopened in 1743. Old Mines existed as a village of some sort by 1748 when it was listed as the residence of a coupled married at Fort de Chartres, given as village des mines.

Discovery of Mine à Breton in the 1770s drained much of the effort from Old Mines, but as Old Mines was only 5 to 6 miles (8.0 to 9.7 km) to the north, it was close enough that some miners continued to live there while working Mine à Breton. Some of the miners' families moved back and forth between Old Mines and Mine à Breton. It is unclear whether Old Mines was continuously inhabited through the 1790s into the first years of the 19th century. There may have been disruptions due to raids by the Osage, and there is a record of a complaint that inhabitants were forced to abandon their homes due to pollution of Old Mines Creek by animal and mining waste. Nevertheless, there were enough inhabitants in 1797 for a petition to be made for an agricultural concession, a request that was not acted on but which may have helped forestall a later request for mining concession by the American Moses Austin who had started larger-scale mining and refining at Mine à Breton.

=== Land concessions and titles ===
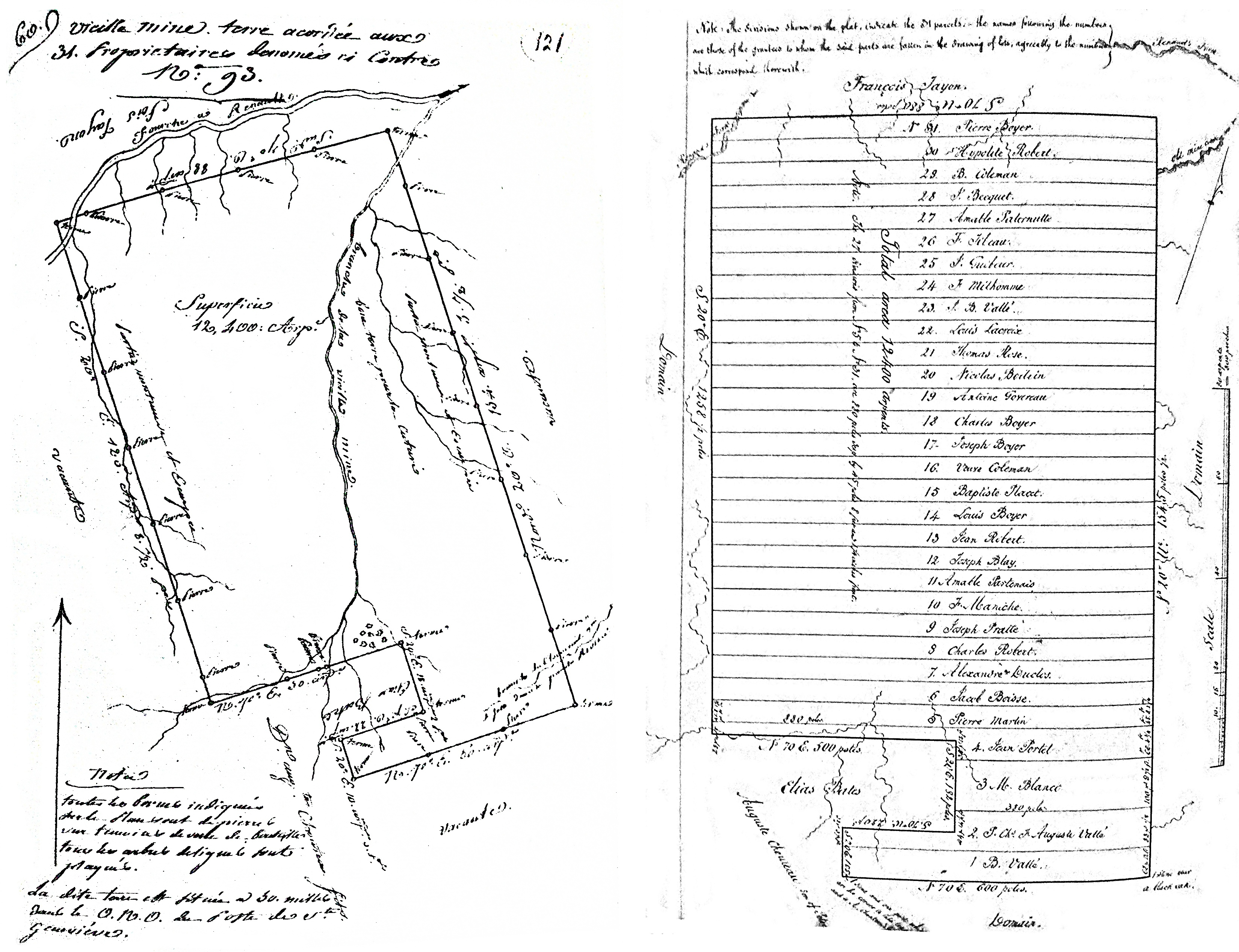
Surveys of the Old Mines land concession of 1803 show the original owners of the 400-arpent plots assigned by lottery

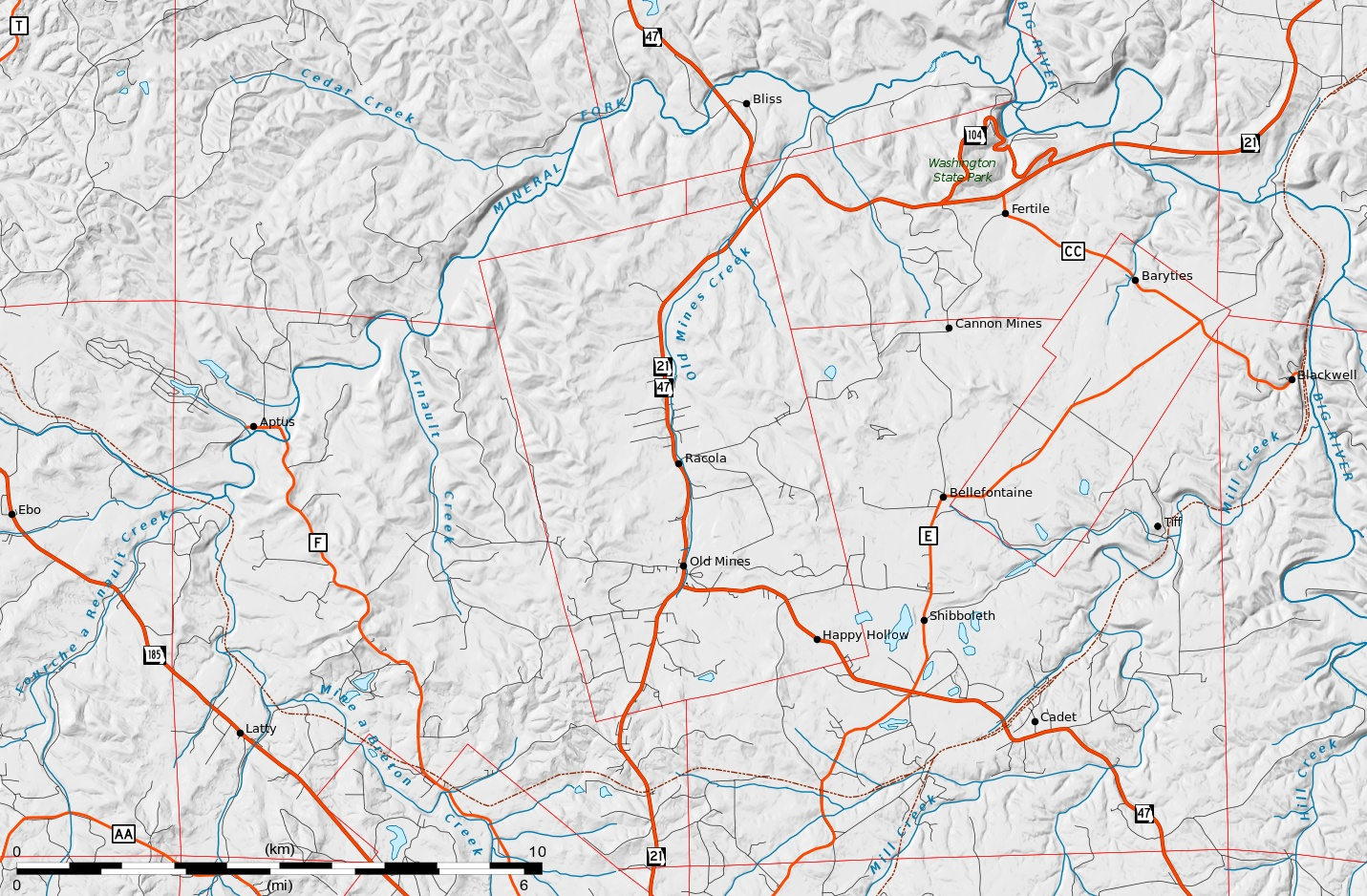
Modern map of the area around the Old Mines concession. Thin red lines show the regular grid of townships interrupted by colonial land grants and concessions, including the Old Mines concession in the center.

Austin's success at Mine à Breton sparked increased attention from interests in Ste. Genevieve and St. Louis who subsequently employed hired labor and slaves to mine ore at Old Mines. When news of the retrocession of Louisiana from Spain to France reached the area, both inhabitants and the absentee interests became more concerned about land ownership. Until around the beginning of the 19th century there was little competition for land, and the French had maintained a casual attitude concerning formalities of ownership.

A new petition was drafted in 1803 by both residents and remote operators. This time, with the assistance of the wealthy operators in St. Louis and Ste. Genevieve, the petition was approved. Commandant François Vallé of Ste. Genevieve wrote the petition himself, had his agent collect signatures, and forwarded the petition to the lieutenant governor. This 1803 petition was submitted as a single group request instead of dozens of individual requests. The participation of the locals lent legitimacy to the petition, and the participation of knowledgeable and connected outsiders helped move the request through the bureaucracy. Although the interest was primarily in lead, the petition was made for land for agriculture in the amount of 400 arpents (340 acres) per family because French law granted free land only for farming. Lieutenant Governor Carlos de Hault de Lassus granted the request on June 4, 1803, for 13,400 arpents (17.7 sq mi).

The concession straddled Old Mines Creek, and in the rush to get the land surveyed and titled before the Americans took over following the Louisiana Purchase, it was laid out into 31 long, narrow plots with a length equal to the full width of the concession. Ownership to individual plots was assigned through a lottery that had no relationship to where individuals had their cabins or worked mines. The mines worked in common at the south end were held out of the subdivision, but there was no accommodation for a usual French village with streets, clustered homes, and a commons. Most of the French ignored the assignment of ownership and continued to live where they had, mostly in the village of Old Mines near the south of the concession, and at Racola near the center. Most had sold their lottery-assigned land within a year to outside speculators.

After the Americans acquired control of the area there was a scramble to certify land claims with the new administration, and much of the activity was fraudulent. It took years to sort through the competing claims. John Smith T, an entrepreneur rival to Moses Austin who lived at Bellfontaine and operated mines there and at Shibboleth, had bought some of the 400-arpent tracts at Old Mines and tried to claim more, thus clouding the ownership. But in 1833 the original concession was officially recognized to the benefit of the initial claimants.

The Old Mines concession persists today as one of the many colonial-era grants recognized by and superimposed on the regular township grid of the American Public Land Survey System, and the pattern of long, narrow plots is visible in aerial photography as found at 38.0401°N 90.759°W

=== Isolation ===
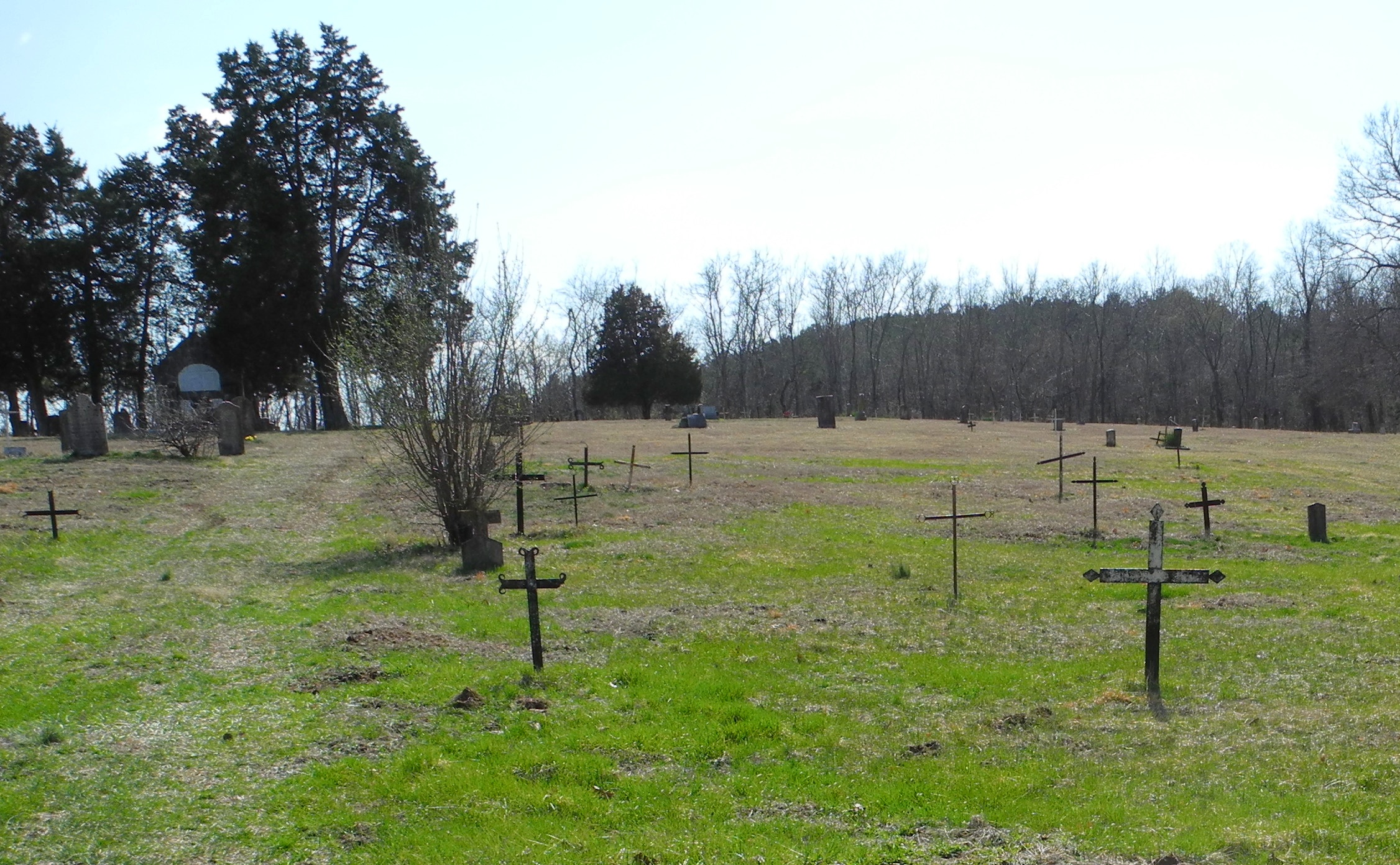
Crosses of wrought iron in St. Joachim Cemetery

Most of the lots in the Old Mines concession were bought by outsiders, but they were speculators who had no permanent interest in the area. So the French continued to dig for lead when and where they wanted, as they always had, with no interference. Meanwhile, the Missouri territory was being overrun by newly arrived Americans. The region had been sparsely settled by the French, and by 1820 Missouri had been thoroughly Americanized with only isolated pockets of French culture surviving at Ste. Genevieve and Old Mines. French culture survived in Ste. Genevieve for a while because of its relatively large French population, some of it wealthy. But Ste. Genevieve, being a center of commerce, attracted its share of newcomers and eventually became more American. However, few of the Americans seeking farmland were attracted to the Old Mines region with its thin, flinty soil.

Easily mined surface deposits of lead were depleted by the mid-19th century, though the state geologist reported small-scale surface mining and refining around Old Mines in 1867. When lead production escalated after the Civil War with capital-intensive deeprock mining techniques, it did so in new areas east of Potosi and Mine a Breton, drawing economic activity even further away from Old Mines. In 1874 mining for "tiff", as barite is called locally, began to replace lead digging in the Old Mines region. It could be extracted manually from near-surface deposits in small operations much as lead had been for generations. This provided the enclave the means to continue supporting itself while maintaining its own way of life after the lead had been mined out. Men would dig tiff a couple days each week to support their families, with additional sustenance coming from home gardens. Eventually the wagon road that Moses Austin had built to haul ore to Herculaneum, which passed through Old Mines, was replaced by a railroad which did not, and the area's isolation became deeper.

Cultural isolation preceded geographic isolation, however. The Americans who developed the local lead industry during the Spanish period had no use for the French except for their labor and their ore. Moses Austin never learned to speak French, and when he platted the town of Potosi for the seat of new Washington County, he excluded the French village of Mine à Breton, not even aligning the streets of the two adjacent towns. The French resented the economic dominance of the Americans to whom they had to sell their ore, and unlike the situation in Ste. Genevieve and St. Louis, there was no local wealthy French establishment to further their cause. When the Osage attacked in 1799 and 1802 and French did not help the Americans fight them off. When geographic isolation set in at about the time of the American Civil War, the French population was already living in cultural isolation, bolstered by their own language, customs, and communities.

== Missouri French ==
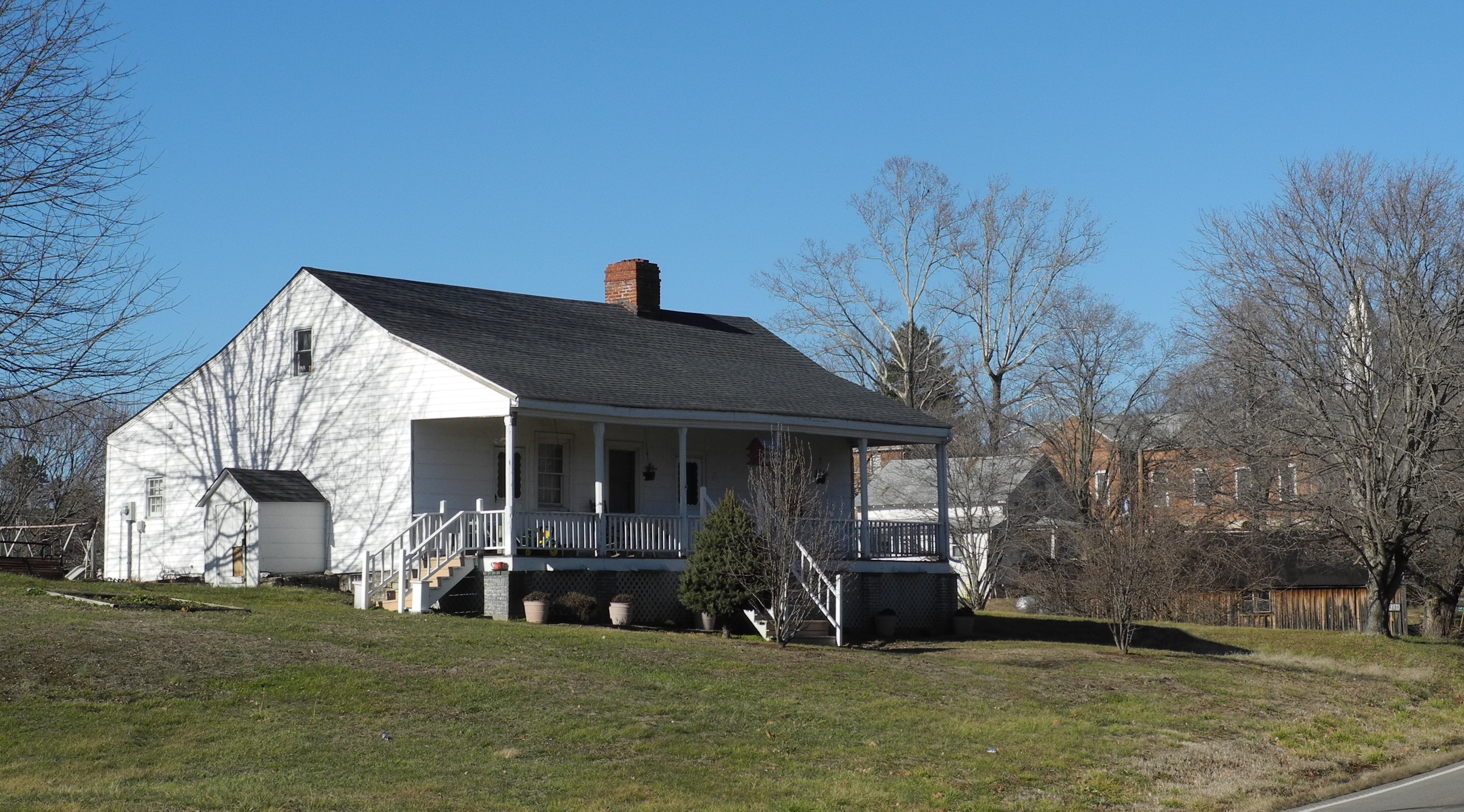
Etienne and Louise LaMarque house, built in 1810 in typical French style, is still a private home.

In its isolation the Old Mines area became a center of Missouri French language and culture. This dialect had developed since the 17th century, when the upper Mississippi River Valley was part of the French colony of Upper Louisiana, also known as the Illinois Country. It was once widely spoken in what is now Missouri and Illinois, and became one of the three major forms of French to develop in what is now the United States, along with Louisiana French and Acadian French. However, it began to die out as the British and later the Americans began settling in the area. Speakers of the dialect called themselves Créoles. They were sometimes known as "paw-paw" French, a term used at least sometimes in self-reference. The name has been described as a "fun-loving insult" referring to a French creole "so poor that he lived on pawpaw in the summer and possum in the winter."

=== Language ===
By the 20th century, Old Mines was the only area of Missouri where Missouri French remained widely spoken. Linguists began studying the dialect at this time. W. M. Miller, an American professor of French, made investigations in the area in the late 1920s, and reported that the local French dialect was an entirely spoken language. Most of the people were illiterate—few could read and write English at the time, and very few, if any, had ever seen French written. Miller also reported incursions of English into French sentences ("Anyhow, je ne sais pas."), and English words adapted to modern items for which the locals' French forebears had left no names ("un can de maiz"). Nevertheless, the impression was that the spoken French was no less grammatical than that spoken by peasants of similar means in areas of France. The language has been described as having a Cajun vocabulary with a Québécois pronunciation. Another linguist, J.-M. Carrière, came to Old Mines in the 1930s and 1940s, finding around 600 French-speaking families there at the time. Carrière undertook a study of the dialect, recording 73 folk tales from local conteurs. Among other distinguishing features, he followed Miller in noting that Missouri French had been heavily influenced by English, with many English words and even entire idiomatic phrases borrowed or translated into the dialect.

Both linguists noted that French was dying out in Old Mines at the time of their studies. Miller reported that the children could not speak it, and the young people would not. Carrière said the influx of English and greater connection with the outside world had undermined the dialect's base, and that young people were finding that speaking French was of no use to them outside of their homes. As late as the 1980s there were perhaps as many as a thousand speakers left, but they were mostly the older generation of age 60 and above. Today the language has all but died out as means of everyday domestic communication, and only a few elderly speakers are able to use it.

=== Culture ===
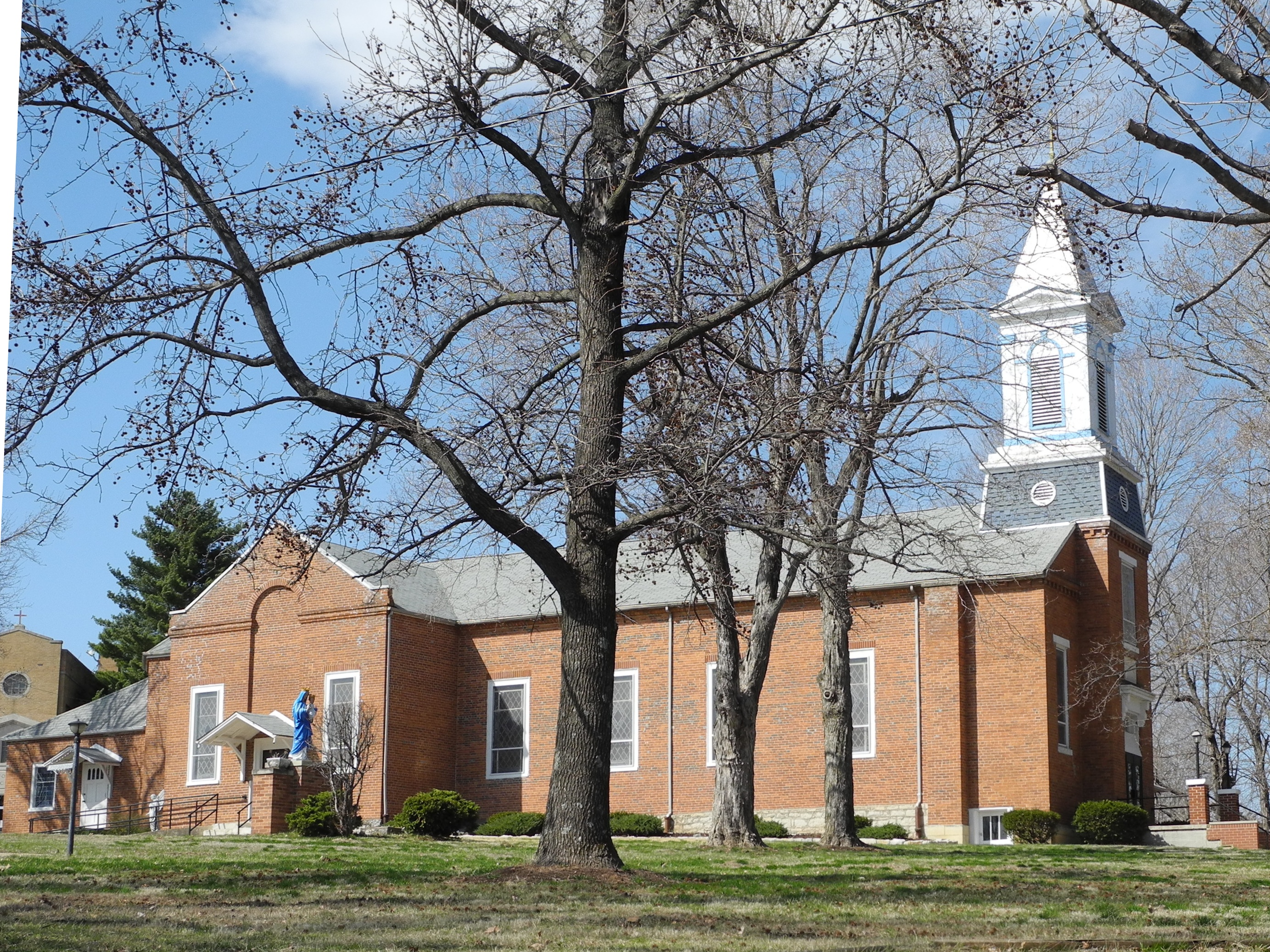
St. Joachim Catholic Church

Traditional French creole culture in the Old Mines area centered on the extended family and the local French community with frequent celebrations. Houses of family were often clustered together.

The distinctive type of home built by Missouri French was of a single story with a broad roof sloping gradually into a roof for the gallery that ran along the broad side of the house, or all around for some of the wealthier French. The style is seen not just in old abodes, but it is still used as a common style in the area for new construction.

The French creole are predominantly Catholic. They were originally served by a mission priest from Ste. Genevieve, and a log church was built in Old Mines in 1820. That was replaced by the brick St. Joachim parish church in 1831. Three years older than St. Louis' Old Cathedral, still in use and a center of community life, St. Joachim is one of the oldest standing churches in Missouri.

=== Assimilation ===
A variety of forces converged in the first part of the 20th century to break down the community's isolation and accelerate assimilation into American culture. Paved state highways eroded the region's physical isolation in the 1920s - Missouri Route 21 runs from St. Louis through the center of the Old Mines region on its way to Potosi and beyond. Cultural isolation was also assailed by World War I and, especially, World War II with mandatory conscription taking many young men and exposing them to the wider world. In the 1930s the prices offered for tiff tumbled, ending more than 200 years of subsistence based on small-scale mining.

Young men left for work in St. Louis and elsewhere. It became impractical for the archdiocese to maintain French-speaking priests for just one parish, so the sacraments were given only in English. Compulsory education in broader-based, English-only schools became the norm.

=== Preservation ===
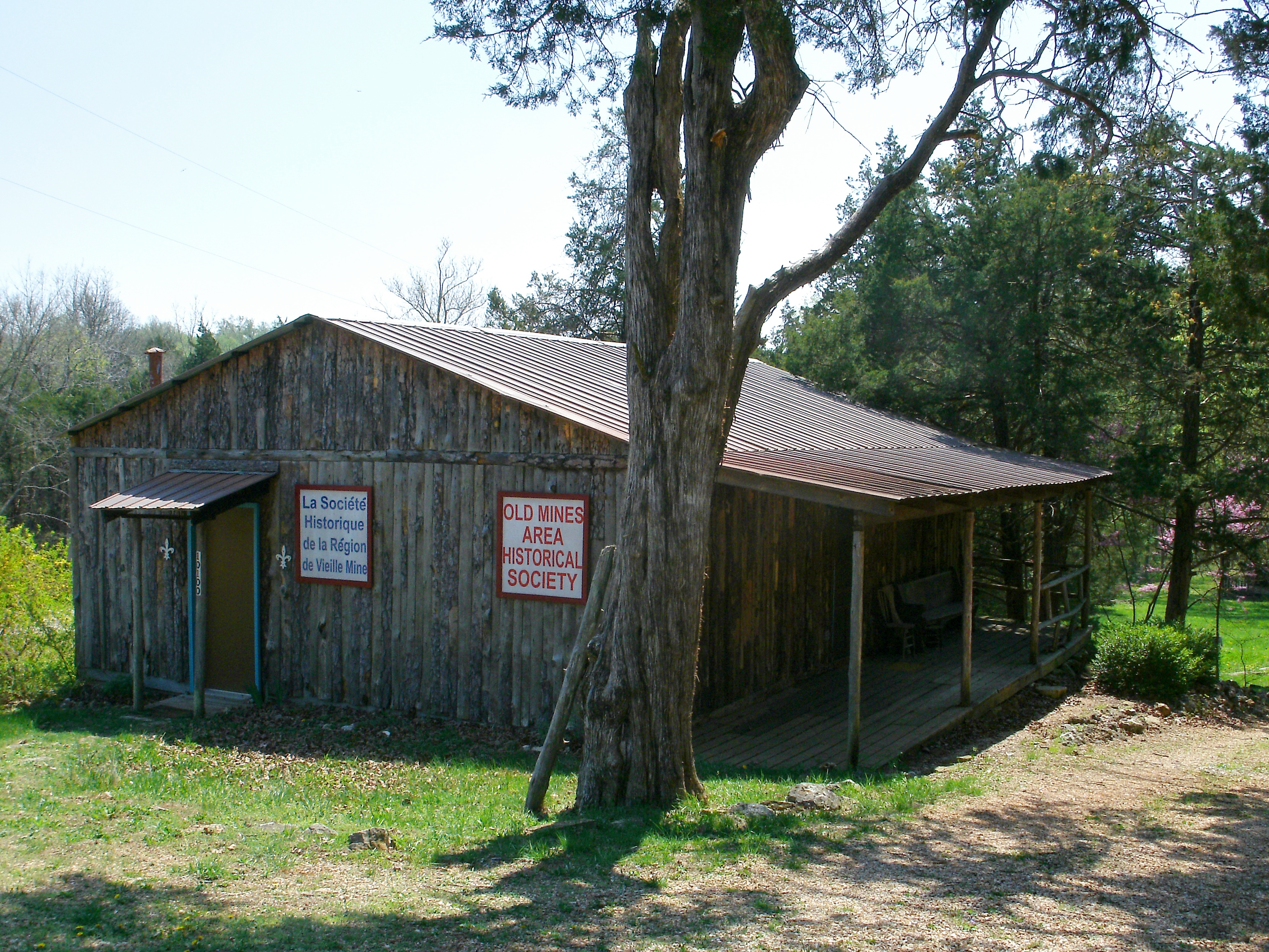
A building of the Old Mines Area Historical Society with a characteristic gallery

The Old Mines Area Historical Society – La Société Historique de la Région de Vieille Mine – works to preserve and promote the French culture and history of the region and has assembled an outdoor museum of historic buildings in Fertile, Missouri. Dr. Rosemary Hyde Thomas, a scholar of the region, has worked to reinforce the culture, as has the Rural Parish Workers of Christ the King in Fertile. Historian and musician Dennis Stroughmatt, who learned to speak French there, promotes the language and folk music of Old Mines.
