= Belgrade, Missouri =

Unincorporated community in Missouri, U.S.

- unincorporated community
- Location within Missouri
- Coordinates: 37°47′12″N 90°50′57″W
- Country: United States
- State: Missouri
- County: Washington County
- Established: 1876

Population
  - Total: 200
- ZIP code: 63622

Belgrade is an unincorporated community in south central Washington County, Missouri, United States. It is located on Missouri Supplemental Route C, approximately five miles (8.0 km) west of Caledonia and ten miles (16 km) south of Potosi.

== History ==
A post office called Belgrade has been in operation since 1867. The community was named after Belgrade, the capital of Serbia. An early variant name was "Bryanville ".

== Geography ==
Belgrade is on the north bank of Big River along Missouri Route C. The town is at an elevation of 886 feet (270 m) above sea level.

== Education ==
Public schools in the Belgrade area are administered by Valley R-6: Caledonia school district.
