= Washington County, Missouri =

County in Missouri, United States

- County
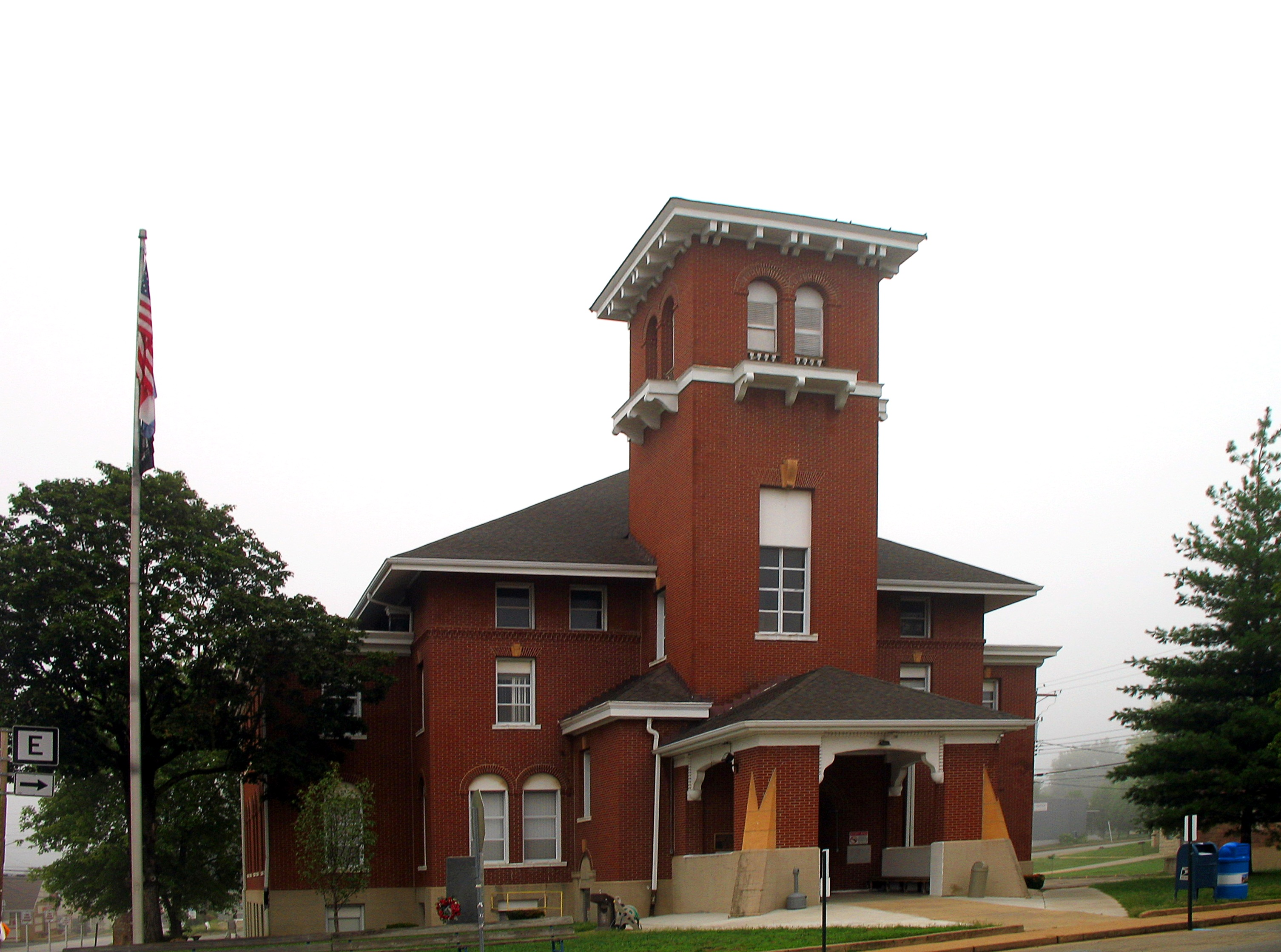
- The Washington County Courthouse in Potosi

- Location within the U.S. state of Missouri
- Coordinates: 37°58′N 90°53′W
- Country: United States
- State: Missouri
- Founded: August 21, 1813
- Named for: President George Washington
- Seat: Potosi
- Largest city: Potosi

Area
  - Total: 762 sq mi (1,970 km^{2})
  - Land: 760 sq mi (2,000 km^{2})
  - Water: 2.6 sq mi (6.7 km^{2}) 0.3%

Population (2020)
  - Total: 23,514
  - Estimate (2025): 23,810 ▲
  - Density: 31/sq mi (12/km^{2})
- Time zone: UTC−6 (Central)
  - Summer (DST): UTC−5 (CDT)
- Congressional district: 8th
- Website: www.washingtoncountymo.us

Washington County is a county located in the southeastern part of the U.S. state of Missouri. As of the 2020 United States census, the population was 23,514. The county seat and largest city is Potosi. The county was officially organized on August 21, 1813, and was named in honor of George Washington, the first President of the United States.

== History ==
The French explorers Renault and La Motte entered the area of present-day Potosi in 1722–23. However, no permanent settlements were made until 1763, when François Breton settled near Potosi and began to operate a mine bearing his name. The Bellview Valley, near Caledonia and Belgrade, was settled in 1802 by the families of William and Helen Watson Reed, their sons, Robert, Joseph, and Thomas Reed, William Reed's brother and nephew, Joseph and William Reed, Annanias McCoy, and Benjamin Crow. Washington County was officially organized on August 21, 1813, out of Ste. Genevieve County.

== Geography ==
According to the U.S. Census Bureau, the county has a total area of 762 square miles (1,970 km^{2}), of which 760 square miles (2,000 km^{2}) is land and 2.6 square miles (6.7 km^{2}) (0.3%) is water.

=== Adjacent counties ===
- Franklin County (north)
- Jefferson County (northeast)
- St. Francois County (east)
- Iron County (south)
- Crawford County (west)

=== National protected area ===
- Mark Twain National Forest (part)

== Demographics ==
Washington County is a county in Missouri, and has a population of 23,514. It is part of the Farmington, MO Micropolitan statistical area, and has a population of 90,554 as of the 2010 census.

Historical population
Census	Pop.	Note	%±
1820	2,769		—
1830	6,784		145.0%
1840	7,213		6.3%
1850	8,811		22.2%
1860	9,723		10.4%
1870	11,719		20.5%
1880	12,896		10.0%
1890	13,153		2.0%
1900	14,263		8.4%
1910	13,378		−6.2%
1920	13,803		3.2%
1930	14,450		4.7%
1940	17,492		21.1%
1950	14,689		−16.0%
1960	14,346		−2.3%
1970	15,086		5.2%
1980	17,983		19.2%
1990	20,380		13.3%
2000	23,344		14.5%
2010	25,195		7.9%
2020	23,514		−6.7%
2025 (est.)	23,810	▲	1.3%
U.S. Decennial Census; 1790–1960 1900–1990; 1990–2000 2010–2015 2020

=== 2020 census ===
As of the 2020 census, the county had a population of 23,514. The median age was 42.2 years, with 22.2% of residents under the age of 18 and 17.7% aged 65 or older. For every 100 females there were 107.9 males, and for every 100 females age 18 and over there were 109.5 males.

The racial makeup of the county was 91.3% White, 2.6% Black or African American, 0.3% American Indian and Alaska Native, 0.2% Asian, 0.0% Native Hawaiian and Pacific Islander, 0.4% from some other race, and 5.2% from two or more races. Hispanic or Latino residents of any race comprised 1.0% of the population.

0.0% of residents lived in urban areas, while 100.0% lived in rural areas.

There were 8,919 households in the county, of which 29.7% had children under the age of 18 living with them and 22.9% had a female householder with no spouse or partner present. About 26.8% of all households were made up of individuals and 11.7% had someone living alone who was 65 years of age or older.

There were 10,719 housing units, of which 16.8% were vacant. Among occupied housing units, 77.1% were owner-occupied and 22.9% were renter-occupied. The homeowner vacancy rate was 1.6% and the rental vacancy rate was 9.2%.

Washington County, Missouri – Racial and ethnic composition Note: the US Census treats Hispanic/Latino as an ethnic category. This table excludes Latinos from the racial categories and assigns them to a separate category. Hispanics/Latinos may be of any race.
Race / Ethnicity (NH = Non-Hispanic)	Pop 1980	Pop 1990	Pop 2000	Pop 2010	Pop 2020	% 1980	% 1990	% 2000	% 2010	% 2020
White alone (NH)	17,733	19,863	22,159	23,969	21,378	98.61%	97.46%	94.92%	95.13%	90.92%
Black or African American alone (NH)	107	378	577	554	610	0.60%	1.85%	2.47%	2.20%	2.59%
Native American or Alaska Native alone (NH)	33	40	149	95	78	0.18%	0.20%	0.64%	0.38%	0.33%
Asian alone (NH)	22	12	35	48	40	0.12%	0.06%	0.15%	0.19%	0.17%
Native Hawaiian or Pacific Islander alone (NH)	x	x	2	5	1	x	x	0.01%	0.02%	0.00%
Other race alone (NH)	13	4	9	8	53	0.07%	0.02%	0.04%	0.03%	0.23%
Mixed race or Multiracial (NH)	x	x	243	261	1,127	x	x	1.04%	1.04%	4.79%
Hispanic or Latino (any race)	75	83	170	255	227	0.42%	0.41%	0.73%	1.01%	0.97%
Total	17,983	20,380	23,344	25,195	23,514	100.00%	100.00%	100.00%	100.00%	100.00%

=== 2000 census ===
Largest ancestries (2000)	Percent
American (United States)	19.8%
French (France)	15.6%
German (Germany)	10.4%
Irish (Republic of Ireland)	9.6%
English (England)	5.9%

As of the census of 2000, there were 23,344 people, 8,406 households, and 6,237 families residing in the county. The population density was 31 inhabitants per square mile (12/km^{2}). There were 9,894 housing units at an average density of 13 units per square mile (5.0/km^{2}). The racial makeup of the county was 95.47% White, 2.48% Black or African American, 0.66% Native American, 0.15% Asian, 0.01% Pacific Islander, 0.15% from other races, and 1.08% from two or more races. Approximately 0.73% of the population were Hispanic or Latino of any race.

There were 8,406 households, out of which 36.40% had children under the age of 18 living with them, 58.60% were married couples living together, 10.60% had a female householder with no husband present, and 25.80% were non-families. 22.00% of all households were made up of individuals, and 9.40% had someone living alone who was 65 years of age or older. The average household size was 2.64 and the average family size was 3.05.

In the county, the population was spread out, with 26.60% under the age of 18, 9.80% from 18 to 24, 29.20% from 25 to 44, 22.70% from 45 to 64, and 11.70% who were 65 years of age or older. The median age was 35 years. For every 100 females there were 106.40 males. For every 100 females age 18 and over, there were 106.40 males.

The median income for a household in the county was $32,001, and the median income for a family was $38,193. Males had a median income of $27,871 versus $18,206 for females. The per capita income for the county was $16,095. About 17.10% of families and 20.80% of the population were below the poverty line, including 25.40% of those under age 18 and 12.90% of those age 65 or older.

=== Religion ===
According to the Association of Religion Data Archives County Membership Report (2000), Washington County is a part of the Bible Belt with evangelical Protestantism being the majority religion. The most predominant denominations among residents in Washington County who adhere to a religion are Roman Catholics (36.73%), Southern Baptists (21.74%), and Baptist Missionary Association of America (16.86%).

== Politics ==
=== Local ===
Republicans hold a sizeable majority of the elected positions in the county.

Washington County, Missouri

Elected countywide officials
Assessor	Heather Eckhoff	Republican
Circuit Clerk	Ashley Gum	Republican
County Clerk	Jeannette Allen	Republican
Collector	Kris Richards	Republican
Commissioner (presiding)	David Sansegraw	Republican
Commissioner (district 1)	Doug Short	Republican
Commissioner (district 2)	Code Brinley	Republican
Coroner	Steven Hatfield	Republican
Prosecuting Attorney	John Jones	Republican
Public Administrator	Judy Gillam	Republican
Recorder	Jamie Miner	Republican
Sheriff	Dwayne S. Reed	Republican
Surveyor	R. Timothy Daugherty	Democratic
Treasurer	Phyllis Long	Republican

=== State ===
Washington County is divided into three legislative districts in the Missouri House of Representatives.

- District 118 – Currently represented by Mike McGirl (R-Potosi) and consists of the northeastern part of the county and includes Cadet, Mineral Point, Old Mines, Richwoods, Tiff, and part of Potosi.

Missouri House of Representatives – District 118 – Washington County (2020)
Party	Candidate	Votes	%	±%
Republican	Mike McGirl	4,757	100.00%	

Missouri House of Representatives – District 118 – Washington County (2016)
Party	Candidate	Votes	%	±%
Democratic	Ben Harris	3,955	100.00%	+53.95

Missouri House of Representatives – District 118 – Washington County (2014)
Party	Candidate	Votes	%	±%
Democratic	Ben Harris	1,316	46.05%	−53.95
Republican	Michael P. McGirl	1,542	53.95%	+53.95

Missouri House of Representatives – District 118 – Washington County (2012)
Party	Candidate	Votes	%	±%
Democratic	Ben Harris	3,783	100.00%	

- District 119 – Currently represented by Nate Tate (R-St. Clair). Consists of the northwestern part of the county, including Pea Ridge.

Missouri House of Representatives – District 119 – Washington County (2020)
Party	Candidate	Votes	%	±%
Republican	Nate Tate	535	98.35%	

Missouri House of Representatives – District 119 – Washington County (2016)
Party	Candidate	Votes	%	±%
Republican	Nate Tate	495	100.00%	+35.35

Missouri House of Representatives – District 119 – Washington County (2014)
Party	Candidate	Votes	%	±%
Republican	Dave Hinson	193	65.65%	−35.35
Democratic	Susan J. Cunningham	101	35.35%	+35.35

Missouri House of Representatives – District 119 – Washington County (2012)
Party	Candidate	Votes	%	±%
Republican	Dave Hinson	447	100.00%	

- District 144 – Currently represented by Chris Dinkins (R-Annapolis). Consists of the southern parts of the county including Belgrade, Caledonia, Courtois, Hopewell, Irondale, and part of Potosi.

Missouri House of Representatives – District 144 – Washington County (2020)
Party	Candidate	Votes	%	±%
Republican	Chris Dinkins	3,335	98.73%	

Missouri House of Representatives – District 144 – Special Election - Washington County (2018)
Party	Candidate	Votes	%	±%
Republican	Chris Dinkins	131	70.81%	
Democratic	Jim Scaggs	53	29.29%	

Missouri House of Representatives – District 144 – Washington County (2016)
Party	Candidate	Votes	%	±%
Republican	Paul Fitzwater	3,177	100.00%	

Missouri House of Representatives – District 144 – Washington County (2014)
Party	Candidate	Votes	%	±%
Republican	Paul Fitzwater	1,837	100.00%	−23.43

Missouri House of Representatives – District 144 – Washington County (2012)
Party	Candidate	Votes	%	±%
Republican	Paul Fitzwater	2,617	76.57%	
Democratic	Michael L. Jackson	801	23.43%	

All of Washington County is a part of Missouri's 3rd District in the Missouri Senate and is currently represented by Elaine Gannon (R-De Soto).

Missouri Senate – District 3 – Washington County (2020)
Party	Candidate	Votes	%	±%
Republican	Elaine Freeman Gannono	8,440	98.60%	

Missouri Senate – District 3 – Washington County (2016)
Party	Candidate	Votes	%	±%
Republican	Gary Romine	7,071	83.11%	+25.35
Green	Edward R. Weissler	1,437	16.89%	+16.89

Missouri Senate – District 3 – Washington County (2012)
Party	Candidate	Votes	%	±%
Republican	Gary Romine	4,905	57.76%	
Democratic	Joseph Fallert Jr.	3,587	42.24%	

Past Gubernatorial Elections Results
Year	Republican	Democratic	Third Parties
2024	79.89% 7,999	17.69% 1,771	2.43% 243
2020	75.34% 7,442	21.47% 2,121	3.19% 315
2016	61.34% 5,681	33.91% 3,141	4.75% 440
2012	42.25% 3,697	55.12% 4,823	2.63% 230
2008	31.08% 2,993	67.05% 6,456	1.87% 180
2004	50.37% 4,622	47.87% 4,393	1.76% 162
2000	42.93% 3,536	49.90% 4,110	7.17% 591
1996	39.69% 3,097	57.77% 4,508	2.54% 198
1992	39.60% 3,049	60.40% 4,851	0.00% 0
1988	57.19% 3,978	42.64% 2,966	0.17% 12
1984	51.46% 3,460	48.54% 3,264	0.00% 0
1980	50.52% 3,278	49.35% 3,202	0.12% 8
1976	47.00% 2,855	52.84% 3,210	0.16% 10

=== Federal ===
U.S. Senate – Missouri – Washington County (2016)
Party	Candidate	Votes	%	±%
Republican	Roy Blunt	5,083	55.41%	+15.32
Democratic	Jason Kander	3,516	38.33%	−15.13
Libertarian	Jonathan Dine	269	2.93%	−3.52
Green	Johnathan McFarland	179	1.95%	+1.95
Constitution	Fred Ryman	126	1.37%	+1.37

U.S. Senate – Missouri – Washington County (2012)
Party	Candidate	Votes	%	±%
Republican	Todd Akin	3,486	40.09%	
Democratic	Claire McCaskill	4,648	53.46%	
Libertarian	Jonathan Dine	561	6.45%	

Washington County is included in Missouri's 8th Congressional District and is currently represented by Jason T. Smith (R-Salem) in the U.S. House of Representatives. Smith won a special election on Tuesday, June 4, 2013, to finish out the remaining term of U.S. Representative Jo Ann Emerson (R-Cape Girardeau). Emerson announced her resignation a month after being reelected with over 70 percent of the vote in the district. She resigned to become CEO of the National Rural Electric Cooperative.

U.S. House of Representatives – District 8 – Washington County (2020)
Party	Candidate	Votes	%	±%
Republican	Jason T. Smith	7,473	77.68%	
Democratic	Kathy Ellis	1,915	19.91%	
Libertarian	Tom Schmitz	219	2.28%	

U.S. House of Representatives – District 8 – Washington County (2016)
Party	Candidate	Votes	%	±%
Republican	Jason T. Smith	6,186	69.70%	+10.33
Democratic	Dave Cowell	2,424	27.31%	−5.81
Libertarian	Jonathan Shell	265	2.99%	+0.83

U.S. House of Representatives – District 8 – Washington County (2014)
Party	Candidate	Votes	%	±%
Republican	Jason T. Smith	2,990	59.37%	−5.99
Democratic	Barbara Stocker	1,668	33.12%	+1.33
Libertarian	Rick Vandeven	109	2.16%	+1.09
Constitution	Doug Enyart	113	2.24%	+0.72
Independent	Terry Hampton	156	3.10%	+3.10

U.S. House of Representatives – District 8 – Special Election – Washington County (2013)
Party	Candidate	Votes	%	±%
Republican	Jason T. Smith	732	65.36%	−2.73
Democratic	Steve Hodges	356	31.79%	+2.66
Libertarian	Bill Slantz	12	1.07%	−1.71
Constitution	Doug Enyart	17	1.52%	+1.52
Write-In	Wayne L. Byington	3	0.27%	+0.27

U.S. House of Representatives – District 8 – Washington County (2012)
Party	Candidate	Votes	%	±%
Republican	Jo Ann Emerson	5,868	68.09%	
Democratic	Jack Rushin	2,510	29.13%	
Libertarian	Rick Vandeven	240	2.78%	

==== Political culture ====
Washington County is one of only two counties, alongside Webster County, West Virginia, to be carried by Barack Obama in 2008 and still give Donald Trump over 80% of the vote in 2020.

United States presidential election results for Washington County, Missouri
Year	Republican		Democratic		Third party(ies)	
Year	No.	%	No.	%	No.	%
1888	1,222	47.73%	1,336	52.19%	2	0.08%
1892	1,200	47.54%	1,303	51.62%	21	0.83%
1896	1,547	51.41%	1,458	48.45%	4	0.13%
1900	1,751	53.60%	1,500	45.91%	16	0.49%
1904	1,673	54.64%	1,339	43.73%	50	1.63%
1908	1,753	56.11%	1,330	42.57%	41	1.31%
1912	1,059	41.27%	1,121	43.69%	386	15.04%
1916	1,657	53.80%	1,394	45.26%	29	0.94%
1920	2,618	58.36%	1,837	40.95%	31	0.69%
1924	2,397	54.42%	1,955	44.38%	53	1.20%
1928	3,019	58.96%	2,091	40.84%	10	0.20%
1932	2,246	40.40%	3,275	58.91%	38	0.68%
1936	2,909	49.29%	2,942	49.85%	51	0.86%
1940	3,817	56.92%	2,881	42.96%	8	0.12%
1944	2,900	58.30%	2,065	41.52%	9	0.18%
1948	2,200	47.98%	2,370	51.69%	15	0.33%
1952	3,338	55.33%	2,684	44.49%	11	0.18%
1956	3,383	58.70%	2,380	41.30%	0	0.00%
1960	3,437	56.47%	2,649	43.53%	0	0.00%
1964	2,286	36.91%	3,908	63.09%	0	0.00%
1968	2,641	46.26%	2,292	40.15%	776	13.59%
1972	3,818	63.14%	2,229	36.86%	0	0.00%
1976	2,526	41.36%	3,543	58.01%	39	0.64%
1980	3,439	53.19%	2,873	44.44%	153	2.37%
1984	3,755	55.70%	2,987	44.30%	0	0.00%
1988	3,240	46.29%	3,744	53.49%	16	0.23%
1992	2,157	26.93%	4,211	52.57%	1,642	20.50%
1996	2,259	28.78%	4,315	54.97%	1,276	16.25%
2000	4,020	48.64%	4,047	48.97%	198	2.40%
2004	4,641	50.57%	4,459	48.58%	78	0.85%
2008	4,706	48.95%	4,711	49.00%	197	2.05%
2012	5,071	58.32%	3,417	39.30%	207	2.38%
2016	7,048	75.53%	1,926	20.64%	357	3.83%
2020	8,047	80.66%	1,804	18.08%	125	1.25%
2024	8,424	82.29%	1,747	17.07%	66	0.64%

At the presidential level, Washington County was a fairly independent-leaning or battleground county for many years; however, it has voted increasingly more Republican in recent elections. While George W. Bush carried Washington County in 2004, he narrowly lost the county to Al Gore in 2000, and both times the margins of victory were significantly closer than in many of the other rural areas. Bill Clinton also carried Washington County both times in 1992 and 1996 by convincing double-digit margins, and unlike most of the other rural counties in Missouri, Washington County was one of only nine counties in Missouri that favored Barack Obama over John McCain. Obama won Washington County by just five votes in the 2008 election.

Like most rural areas throughout Missouri, voters in Washington County generally adhere to socially and culturally conservative principles but are more moderate or populist on economic issues, typical of the Dixiecrat philosophy. In 2004, Missourians voted on a constitutional amendment to define marriage as the union between a man and a woman—it overwhelmingly passed Washington County with 81.37 percent of the vote. The initiative passed the state with 71 percent of support from voters as Missouri became the first state to ban same-sex marriage. In 2006, Missourians voted on a constitutional amendment to fund and legalize embryonic stem cell research in the state—it failed in Washington County with 56.48 percent voting against the measure. The initiative narrowly passed the state with 51 percent of support from voters as Missouri became one of the first states in the nation to approve embryonic stem cell research. Despite Washington County's longstanding tradition of supporting socially conservative platforms, voters in the county have a penchant for advancing populist causes like increasing the minimum wage. In 2006, Missourians voted on a proposition (Proposition B) to increase the minimum wage in the state to $6.50 an hour—it passed Washington County with 81.47 percent of the vote. The proposition strongly passed every single county in Missouri with 75.94 percent voting in favor as the minimum wage was increased to $6.50 an hour in the state. In 2018, Washington County rejected Proposition A which would have made Missouri a right-to-work state with 82.1 percent of the vote.

== Education ==
Among adults 25 years of age and older in Washington County, 62.5% possess a high school diploma or higher, while 7.5% hold a bachelor's degree or higher as their highest educational attainment.

=== Public schools ===
- Kingston K-XIV School District – Cadet
  - Kingston Elementary School (PK-05)
  - Kingston Middle School (06-08)
  - Kingston High School (09-12)
- Potosi R-III School District – Potosi
  - Potosi Pre-School (PK)
  - Potosi Elementary School (PK-03)
  - Trojan Intermediate School (04-06)
  - John A. Evans Middle School (07-08)
  - Potosi High School (09-12)
- Richwoods R-VII School District – Richwoods
  - Richwoods Elementary School (PK-08)
- Valley R-VI School District – Caledonia/ Belgrade
  - Valley Elementary School (K-6) – Caledonia
  - Valley High School (07-12)- Caledonia

=== Private schools ===
- St. Joachim Elementary School – Cadet – (PK-08) – Roman Catholic

=== Colleges and universities ===
- Mineral Area College Annex – Potosi – A satellite campus of Mineral Area College-Park Hills.

=== Public libraries ===
- Washington County Library

== Government and infrastructure ==
The Potosi Correctional Center of the Missouri Department of Corrections is located in an unincorporated area in the county. The prison houses male death row inmates. 911 services are provided by the Washington County Central Dispatch Center. Major fire departments in the county include those of Potosi, Richwoods, Irondale, Belgrade, and Caledonia. The Washington County Sheriff's Office provides law enforcement for the county. Its sheriff is Dwayne S. Reed as of 2025.

== Attractions ==
- Big River Access – Belgrade
- Council Bluff Lake – Belgrade
- Berryman Camp & Trail National Forest – Berryman
- Bootleg Park Bootleg Access – Caledonia
- Buford Mountain – Caledonia
- Hughes Mountain Natural Area – Irondale
- Bismarck Conservation Area – Bismarck
- Little Indian Creek Conservation Area – Sullivan
- Pea Ridge Conservation Area – Sullivan
- YMCA of the Ozarks – Shirley

== Transportation ==
=== Primary state highways ===
- Route 8. Hopewell-Potosi
- Route 21. Cadet-Potosi-Caledonia
- Route 32. Caledonia-Bismarck
- Route 47. Lonedell-Richwoods-Blackwell
- Route 104. Blackwell
- Route 185. Sullivan-Ebo-Potosi

=== Secondary state highways ===
- State Route A. Richwoods-Sullivan
- State Route AA. Shirley
- State Route BB. Belgrade
- State Route C. Belgrade-Viburnum
- State Route CC. Blackwell
- State Route DD. Belgrade
- State Route E. Potosi-Cadet-Blackwell
- State Route EE. Sullivan
- State Route F. Potosi
- State Route H. Richwoods-Fletcher
- State Route JJ. Belgrade
- State Route M. Irondale
- State Route N. Sullivan
- State Route o. Mineral Point
- State Route P. Belgrade-Potosi
- State Route T. Richwoods
- State Route U. Irondale-Mineral Point
- State Route W. Bourbon
- State Route WW. Fletcher
- State Route N. Bourbon
- State Route Y. Viburnum-Belgrade-Berryman
- State Route Z. Belgrade

=== Airports ===
- Washington County Airport

=== Railroads ===
- Union Pacific Railroad

== Communities ==
=== Cities ===
- Irondale
- Potosi (county seat)

=== Villages ===
- Caledonia
- Mineral Point

=== Census-designated place ===
- Terre du Lac

=== Unincorporated communities ===
- Anthonies Mill
- Aptus
- Baryties
- Bellefontaine
- Belgrade
- Berryman
- Bliss
- Cadet
- Cannon Mines
- Courtois
- Cruise Mill
- Delbridge
- Ebo
- Fertile
- Floyd
- French Town
- Frogtown
- Happy Hollow
- Hopewell
- Horton Town
- Hulsey
- Hurricane
- Latty
- Levy
- Maryden
- Northcut
- Old Mines
- Peoria
- Quaker
- Rabbitville
- Racola
- Richwoods
- Robidoux
- Shibboleth
- Shirley
- Summit
- Sunlight
- Theabeau Town
- Tiff

=== Townships ===
- Belgrade
- Breton
- Concord
- Harmony
- Johnson
- Kingston
- Liberty
- Richwoods
- Union
- Walton

== See also ==
- National Register of Historic Places listings in Washington County, Missouri
