= Rutledge =

Rutledge may refer to:

== Places ==
=== United States ===
- Rutledge, Alabama, a town
- Rutledge, Florida, an unincorporated community
- Rutledge, Georgia, a city
- Rutledge, Minnesota, a city
- Rutledge, Missouri, a village
- Rutledge, Pennsylvania, a borough
- Rutledge, Tennessee, a city
- Rutledge, West Virginia, an unincorporated community
- Rutledge, Wisconsin, an unincorporated community
- Rutledge Township, DeWitt County, Illinois
- Rutledge Run, Missouri, a stream

=== Other places ===
- Rutledge, New South Wales, Australia, a parish

== People ==
=== Surname ===
- Ann Rutledge (1813–1835), allegedly Abraham Lincoln's first love
- Archibald Rutledge (1883–1973), American poet and educator
- Arthur Rutledge (1843–1917), Australian politician, barrister and judge
- Arthur Rutledge (trade unionist) (1907–1997), American trade unionist
- Ben Rutledge (born 1980), Canadian rower
- D. W. Rutledge (born c. 1951), American high school football coach
- David Rutledge (engineer) (born 1952), American professor of engineering
- David E. Rutledge, American 21st century politician
- Dale Rutledge, American 21st century politician
- Derrick Rutledge (born 1961), American celebrity stylist and makeup artist
- Earl Rutledge (1894–1974), Canadian politician
- Edward Rutledge (1749–1800), American Founding Father, signer of the Declaration of Independence and Governor of South Carolina; brother of John Rutledge
- Francis Huger Rutledge (1799–1866), first Episcopal bishop of Florida
- Fleming Rutledge (born 1937), American Episcopal priest, author, theologian and preacher
- Guy Rutledge (1872–1930), British barrister and colonial judge and official in Lower Burma
- Harley Rutledge (1926–2006), American physicist and ufologist
- Ian Rutledge (born 1972), Australian-born New Zealand field hockey coach
- Jackson Rutledge (born 1999), American Major League Baseball pitcher
- James Rutledge, English musician, record producer and remixer
- James Edward Rutledge (1889–1966), Canadian lawyer and politician
- Jason Rutledge (born 1977), New Zealand rugby union player
- Jeff Rutledge (born 1957), American former National Football League quarterback
- Jim Rutledge (born 1959), Canadian golfer
- John Rutledge (1739–1800), American Founding Father, signer of the Constitution and Chief Justice of the United States; brother of Edward Rutledge
- John Rutledge Jr. (1766–1819), American politician; son of John Rutledge
- Johnny Rutledge (born 1977), American former National Football League player
- Josh Rutledge (born 1989), American former Major League Baseball player
- Justin Rutledge (born 1979), Canadian alternate country music singer-songwriter
- Keylan Rutledge (born 2003), American football player
- Larry Rutledge, American early 1980s college football coach
- Laura Rutledge (born 1988), American television journalist; wife of Josh Rutledge
- Leslie Rutledge (born 1976), American attorney and politician, Lieutenant Governor and former Attorney General of Arkansas
- Leicester Rutledge (born 1952), New Zealand former rugby union player
- Margaret Fane Rutledge (1914–2004), Canadian pioneering pilot
- Martin Rutledge (born 1954), British Army major-general
- Matt Rutledge (born 1972), American internet entrepreneur
- Patrick H. Rutledge (1830–1902), American politician and lawyer
- Paul Rutledge (born 1962), New Zealand cricketer
- Peter Rutledge, New Zealand chemist
- Peter B. Rutledge, American attorney and law professor
- Philip James Rutledge (1925–2007), American academic
- Phyllis Rutledge (1932–2015), American politician
- Raquel Rutledge, American investigative reporter
- Robert Rutledge (1948–2001), American sound editor
- Rod Rutledge (born 1975), American former National Football League player
- Ross Rutledge (1962–2004), Canadian field hockey player
- Tal Rutledge (1929–2020), American civil rights activist
- Thomas Rutledge (1819–1904), Irish-born Australian politician
- Thomas Lloyd Forster Rutledge (1889–1958), Australian politician
- Tom Rutledge, American cable television executive
- Wayne Rutledge (1942–2004), Canadian National Hockey League goaltender
- Wiley Blount Rutledge (1894–1949), U.S. Supreme Court associate justice
- William Rutledge (1806–1876), politician in colonial Victoria (Australia)
- William Robert Rutledge (1866–1948), Canadian politician

=== Given name ===
- Rutledge Dennis (born 1939), American sociologist
- Rutledge P. Hazzard (1925–2008), CIA division director
- Rutledge Pearson (1929–1967), American educator, civil rights leader, human rights activist and Negro league baseball player
- Rutledge Wood (born 1980), American racing analyst

== Fiction ==
- Braxton Rutledge, title character of Sergeant Rutledge, a 1960 American Western film
- Inspector Ian Rutledge, in the mystery series of the same name by Caroline and Charles Todd
- "William Rutledge", supposed name for the "commander" of the non-existent Apollo 20 hoax moon shot
- Rutledge, a novel by Miriam Coles Harris

== Other uses ==
- Rutledge School, Rutledge, Missouri, a former school on the National Register of Historic Places

== See also ==
- Attorney General Rutledge (disambiguation)
- Governor Rutledge (disambiguation)
- Routledge, a publishing imprint
- Routledge (surname)
