= 2014 Arkansas Attorney General election =

In 2014, Arkansas Attorney General Election was held on Nov. 6, 2018

- November 4, 2014
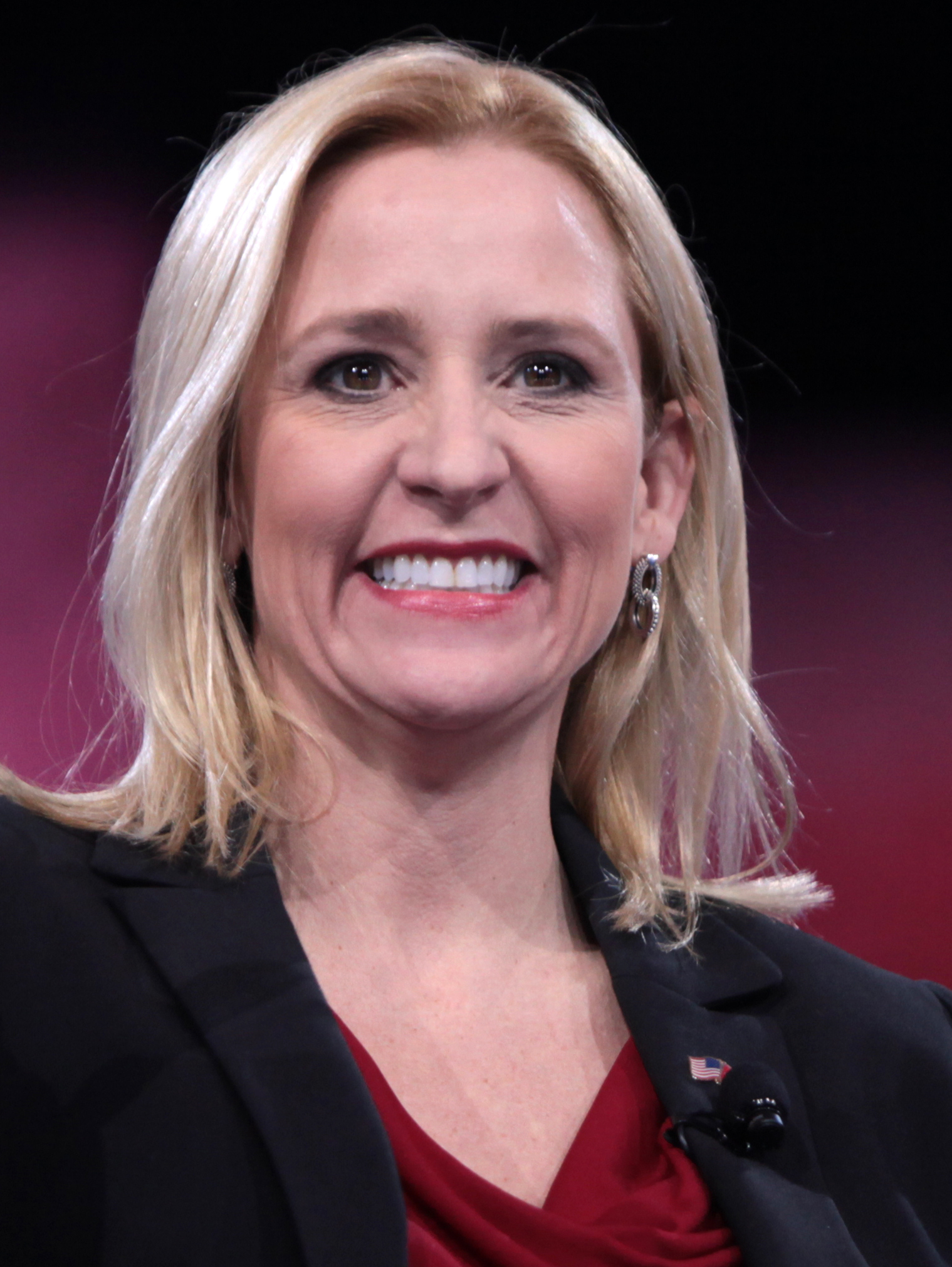

Nominee	Leslie Rutledge	Nate Steel	Aaron Cash
Party	Republican	Democratic	Libertarian
Popular vote	430,799	360,680	43,245
Percentage	51.61%	43.21%	5.18%
- County results Rutledge: 40–50% 50–60% 60–70% Steel: 40–50% 50–60% 60–70% 70–80%
Attorney General before election
Dustin McDaniel
Democratic
Elected Attorney General
Leslie Rutledge
Republican

The 2014 Arkansas Attorney General election was held on November 4, 2014, to elect the attorney general of Arkansas.

Republican nominee Leslie Rutledge was elected to the office, the first woman elected to the office and the first Republican to be elected to the office since 1874 (during the reconstruction period). Incumbent Democratic Attorney General Dustin McDaniel was term-limited and could not run for re-election to a third term in office.

== Democratic nominee ==
- Nate Steel, state representative

== Republican primary ==
=== Candidates ===
- Patricia Nation, attorney
- Leslie Rutledge, lawyer
- David Sterling, attorney

==== Declined to run ====
- J. Cody Hiland, Faulkner County prosecutor
- Marvin Childers, former state representative and president of The Poultry Federation

=== Polling ===
Poll source	Date(s) administered	Sample size	Margin of error	Patricia Nation	Leslie Rutledge	David Sterling	Undecided
Talk Business/Hendrix College	April 29, 2014	1,516	± 2.5%	10%	9%	21%	60%

=== Primary results ===
Republican primary results
Party	Candidate	Votes	%
Republican	Leslie Rutledge	79,347	47.21
Republican	Andy Mayberry	65,733	39.11
Republican	Debra Hobbs	22,986	13.68
Total votes		168,066	100

=== Runoff results ===
Rutledge and Sterling contested a runoff, which was characterized as a "full-fledged street brawl." Outside groups spent hundreds of thousands of dollars on attack ads and both candidates "question[ed] each others' conservative credentials and political experience." Nation endorsed Rutledge, who handily defeated Sterling.

Republican primary runoff results
Party	Candidate	Votes	%
Republican	Leslie Rutledge	43,898	58.89
Republican	David Sterling	30,643	41.11
Total votes		74,541	100

== Libertarian nominee ==
- Aaron Cash

== General election ==
In September 2014, Pulaski County Clerk Larry Crane cancelled Rutledge's voter registration after it was revealed that she was registered to vote in several other states. Rutledge, who has an Arkansas voter registration card, had cancelled her Pulaski County voter registration in July 2008 and registered to vote in Washington, D.C., instead. However, she did not vote in any elections in D.C., instead voting via absentee ballot in the 2008 general election in Pulaski County. She then registered to vote in Virginia in September 2010. If she remains unregistered, she would be ineligible to serve as Attorney General as the Arkansas Constitution states "No persons shall be elected to, or appointed to fill a vacancy in, any office who does not possess the qualifications of an elector." Rutledge denounced Crane for using "partisan politics to disenfranchise a voter in an attempt to hijack an election." Crane responded that he "did what the law requires" and invited Rutledge to re-register.

=== Polling ===
Poll source	Date(s) administered	Sample size	Margin of error	Nate Steel (D)	Leslie Rutledge (R)	Aaron Cash (L)	Undecided
Public Policy Polling	October 30–November 1, 2014	1,092	± 3%	40%	44%	7%	8%
Suffolk	September 20–23, 2014	500	± 4.4%	36%	36%	5%	23%
Public Policy Polling	September 18–21, 2014	1,453	± 2.6%	35%	41%	7%	17%
Gravis Marketing	September 8–11, 2014	902	± 4%	33%	42%	3%	22%
Answers Unlimited	September 7–9, 2014	600	± 3.5%	37%	34%	5%	24%
Public Policy Polling	August 1–3, 2014	1,066	± 3%	32%	38%	10%	20%
Gravis Marketing	July 7–8, 2014	987	± 3%	41%	51%	8%	—

=== Results ===
2014 Arkansas Attorney General election
Party	Candidate	Votes	%
Republican	Leslie Rutledge	430,799	51.61
Democratic	Nate Steel	360,680	43.21
Libertarian	Aaron Cash	43,245	5.18
Total votes		834,724	100.00
Republican gain from Democratic			

==== By county ====
County	Nate Steel Democratic		Leslie Rutledge Republican		Aaron Cash Libertarian		Margin		Total
County	#	%	#	%	#	%	#	%	Total
Arkansas	2,441	48.53%	2,408	47.87%	181	3.60%	-33	-0.66%	5,030
Ashley	2,805	45.77%	3,129	51.05%	195	3.18%	324	5.29%	6,129
Baxter	4,146	28.20%	9,811	66.74%	743	5.05%	5,665	38.54%	14,700
Benton	20,139	32.50%	37,611	60.69%	4,224	6.82%	17,472	28.19%	61,974
Boone	2,740	25.68%	7,127	66.79%	803	7.53%	4,387	41.12%	10,670
Bradley	1,319	46.59%	1,400	49.45%	112	3.96%	81	2.86%	2,831
Calhoun	720	44.80%	811	50.47%	76	4.73%	91	5.66%	1,607
Carroll	3,067	38.45%	4,437	55.62%	473	5.93%	1,370	17.17%	7,977
Chicot	2,309	66.64%	1,073	30.97%	83	2.40%	-1,236	-35.67%	3,465
Clark	3,976	57.98%	2,654	38.70%	228	3.32%	-1,322	-19.28%	6,858
Clay	1,850	47.09%	1,841	46.86%	238	6.06%	-9	-0.23%	3,929
Cleburne	2,913	29.73%	6,256	63.85%	629	6.42%	3,343	34.12%	9,798
Cleveland	1,004	37.31%	1,587	58.97%	100	3.72%	583	21.66%	2,691
Columbia	3,049	40.80%	4,176	55.88%	248	3.32%	1,127	15.08%	7,473
Conway	2,976	47.53%	2,965	47.36%	320	5.11%	-11	-0.18%	6,261
Craighead	10,737	43.09%	12,882	51.70%	1,298	5.21%	2,145	8.61%	24,917
Crawford	4,935	30.78%	10,034	62.58%	1,066	6.65%	5,099	31.80%	16,035
Crittenden	5,875	56.02%	4,331	41.30%	281	2.68%	-1,544	-14.72%	10,487
Cross	2,549	48.95%	2,452	47.09%	206	3.96%	-97	-1.86%	5,207
Dallas	1,167	49.41%	1,114	47.16%	81	3.43%	-53	-2.24%	2,362
Desha	2,158	65.24%	1,060	32.04%	90	2.72%	-1,098	-33.19%	3,308
Drew	2,510	48.82%	2,472	48.08%	159	3.09%	-38	-0.74%	5,141
Faulkner	12,965	38.70%	18,721	55.88%	1,817	5.42%	5,756	17.18%	33,503
Franklin	2,107	38.89%	2,968	54.78%	343	6.33%	861	15.89%	5,418
Fulton	1,273	38.24%	1,872	56.23%	184	5.53%	599	17.99%	3,329
Garland	11,749	38.50%	17,125	56.12%	1,640	5.37%	5,376	17.62%	30,514
Grant	1,840	34.59%	3,174	59.67%	305	5.73%	1,334	25.08%	5,319
Greene	4,427	40.90%	5,850	54.05%	546	5.04%	1,423	13.15%	10,823
Hempstead	2,451	46.32%	2,675	50.56%	165	3.12%	224	4.23%	5,291
Hot Spring	3,978	42.77%	4,772	51.31%	550	5.91%	794	8.54%	9,300
Howard	2,556	70.43%	1,017	28.02%	56	1.54%	-1,539	-42.41%	3,629
Independence	3,029	28.95%	6,923	66.16%	512	4.89%	3,894	37.21%	10,464
Izard	1,643	38.27%	2,435	56.72%	215	5.01%	792	18.45%	4,293
Jackson	1,965	48.14%	1,910	46.79%	207	5.07%	-55	-1.35%	4,082
Jefferson	13,205	66.69%	6,055	30.58%	541	2.73%	-7,150	-36.11%	19,801
Johnson	2,730	42.23%	3,278	50.71%	456	7.05%	548	8.48%	6,464
Lafayette	1,060	45.09%	1,212	51.55%	79	3.36%	152	6.47%	2,351
Lawrence	2,025	44.64%	2,204	48.59%	307	6.77%	179	3.95%	4,536
Lee	1,718	66.69%	812	31.52%	46	1.79%	-906	-35.17%	2,576
Lincoln	1,436	47.04%	1,467	48.05%	150	4.91%	31	1.02%	3,053
Little River	1,854	46.40%	2,008	50.25%	134	3.35%	154	3.85%	3,996
Logan	2,546	39.82%	3,368	52.67%	480	7.51%	822	12.86%	6,394
Lonoke	5,788	29.99%	12,376	64.12%	1,137	5.89%	6,588	34.13%	19,301
Madison	2,068	40.86%	2,695	53.25%	298	5.89%	627	12.39%	5,061
Marion	1,429	28.93%	3,201	64.80%	310	6.28%	1,772	35.87%	4,940
Miller	3,912	34.65%	7,030	62.26%	349	3.09%	3,118	27.61%	11,291
Mississippi	5,243	52.54%	4,216	42.25%	520	5.21%	-1,027	-10.29%	9,979
Monroe	1,316	55.88%	975	41.40%	64	2.72%	-341	-14.48%	2,355
Montgomery	1,165	40.44%	1,556	54.01%	160	5.55%	391	13.57%	2,881
Nevada	1,313	48.38%	1,298	47.83%	103	3.80%	-15	-0.55%	2,714
Newton	907	30.33%	1,876	62.74%	207	6.92%	969	32.41%	2,990
Ouachita	3,887	50.23%	3,541	45.76%	311	4.02%	-346	-4.47%	7,739
Perry	1,436	40.58%	1,877	53.04%	226	6.39%	441	12.46%	3,539
Phillips	3,816	67.64%	1,655	29.33%	171	3.03%	-2,161	-38.30%	5,642
Pike	1,495	48.46%	1,466	47.52%	124	4.02%	-29	-0.94%	3,085
Poinsett	2,705	43.31%	3,175	50.84%	365	5.84%	470	7.53%	6,245
Polk	1,977	31.55%	3,823	61.00%	467	7.45%	1,846	29.46%	6,267
Pope	5,546	32.80%	10,297	60.90%	1,066	6.30%	4,751	28.10%	16,909
Prairie	1,006	38.22%	1,474	56.00%	152	5.78%	468	17.78%	2,632
Pulaski	74,870	59.61%	45,909	36.55%	4,825	3.84%	-28,961	-23.06%	125,604
Randolph	2,169	43.69%	2,461	49.57%	335	6.75%	292	5.88%	4,965
Saline	13,261	33.79%	23,621	60.19%	2,365	6.03%	10,360	26.40%	39,247
Scott	1,095	36.02%	1,750	57.57%	195	6.41%	655	21.55%	3,040
Searcy	785	26.43%	1,966	66.20%	219	7.37%	1,181	39.76%	2,970
Sebastian	10,991	34.89%	18,521	58.79%	1,993	6.33%	7,530	23.90%	31,505
Sevier	1,761	50.11%	1,631	46.41%	122	3.47%	-130	-3.70%	3,514
Sharp	1,959	35.01%	3,311	59.17%	326	5.83%	1,352	24.16%	5,596
St. Francis	3,743	63.20%	2,031	34.30%	148	2.50%	-1,712	-28.91%	5,922
Stone	1,468	33.15%	2,694	60.83%	267	6.03%	1,226	27.68%	4,429
Union	4,640	38.80%	6,913	57.80%	407	3.40%	2,273	19.01%	11,960
Van Buren	2,136	36.62%	3,280	56.23%	417	7.15%	1,144	19.61%	5,833
Washington	25,030	46.59%	25,282	47.05%	3,417	6.36%	252	0.47%	53,729
White	6,299	29.17%	14,064	65.13%	1,232	5.71%	7,765	35.96%	21,595
Woodruff	1,350	63.71%	672	31.71%	97	4.58%	-678	-32.00%	2,119
Yell	2,172	42.26%	2,685	52.24%	283	5.51%	513	9.98%	5,140
Totals	360,680	43.21%	430,799	51.61%	43,245	5.18%	70,119	8.40%	834,724

Counties that flipped from Democratic to Republican

- Ashley (Largest city: Crossett)
- Baxter (Largest city: Mountain Home)
- Benton (Largest city: Rogers)
- Boone (Largest city: Harrison)
- Calhoun (Largest city: Hampton)
- Carroll (Largest city: Berryville)
- Cleburne (Largest city: Heber Springs)
- Cleveland (Largest city: Rison)
- Columbia (Largest city: Magnolia)
- Craighead (Largest city: Jonesboro)
- Crawford (Largest city: Van Buren)
- Faulkner (Largest city: Conway)
- Franklin (Largest city: Ozark)
- Fulton (Largest city: Salem)
- Garland (Largest city: Hot Springs)
- Grant (Largest city: Sheridan)
- Greene (Largest city: Paragould)
- Hempstead (largest city: Hope)
- Hot Spring (Largest city: Malvern)
- Independence (Largest city: Batesville)
- Izard (Largest city: Horseshoe Bend)
- Johnson (Largest city: Clarksville)
- Lafayette (Largest city: Stamps)
- Lawrence (largest city: Walnut Ridge)
- Lincoln (largest city: Star City)
- Little River (largest city: Ashdown)
- Logan (Largest city: Booneville)
- Lonoke (Largest city: Cabot)
- Madison (Largest city: Huntsville)
- Marion (Largest city: Bull Shoals)
- Miller (Largest city: Texarkana)
- Montgomery (Largest city: Mount Ida)
- Newton (Largest city: Jasper)
- Perry (Largest city: Perryville)
- Poinsett (largest city: Harrisburg)
- Polk (Largest city: Mena)
- Pope (Largest city: Russellville)
- Prairie (Largest city: Des Arc)
- Randolph (largest city: Pocahontas)
- Saline (Largest city: Benton)
- Scott (Largest city: Waldron)
- Searcy (Largest city: Marshall)
- Sebastian (Largest city: Fort Smith)
- Sharp (Largest city: Cherokee Village)
- Stone (Largest city: Mountain View)
- Union (Largest city: El Dorado)
- Van Buren (Largest city: Clinton)
- Washington (Largest city: Fayetteville)
- White (Largest city: Searcy)
- Yell (Largest city: Dardanelle)
