= Judson High School =

Location
- 9142 FM 78; Converse, Bexar County, Texas 78109; United States; 29.509634°N 98.306707°W

Information
- School type: Public, high school
- Established: 1959
- Locale: Suburb: Large
- School district: Judson ISD
- NCES School ID: 482499002789
- Principal: Eric Pawkett
- Faculty: 170.13 (on an FTE basis)
- Grades: 9–12
- Enrollment: 2,527 (2023–2024)
- Student to teacher ratio: 14.86
- Colors: Red & Grey
- Athletics conference: UIL Class AAAAAA
- Mascot: Rocket
- Newspaper: The Fuel
- Yearbook: The Rocket
- Website: Judson High School

Judson High School is a public, co-educational secondary school in Converse, Texas, 15 miles northeast of downtown San Antonio. It was established in 1959 as part of the Judson Independent School District, and is currently classified as a 6A school by the University Interscholastic League (UIL). During 2022–2023, Judson High School had an enrollment of 2,666 students and a student to teacher ratio of 15.22. The school received an overall rating of "D" from the Texas Education Agency for the 2024–2025 school year.

== History ==
Judson High School is the second oldest International Baccalaureate World School in Texas, since 1985. The school and the District were named after Moses Campbell Judson, who served on the Bexar County School Board from 1918 to 1939. His nephew Jack Judson was on the board when the decision was made to name the new rural high school Judson.

For a portion of its history up through 2010, Judson High School used a dual campus system wherein juniors and seniors attended the "Red Campus" and freshmen and sophomores attended the "Gray Campus." Previous to this dual campus system, Judson also had an atypical structure because it only housed grades 10–12 with the middle schools supporting grades 7–9. These structural departures from a typical high school system were due to efforts to accommodate the area's rapid population growth.

A single building now houses all departments with the exception of the agriculture facilities. All original buildings that made up the Red Campus were razed in 2011 to make way for new athletic fields and tennis courts, and the Gray Campus was re-purposed into Judson Middle School. The Judson ISD Performing Arts Center (PAC), constructed in 1998, houses the band, choir, orchestra, and drama classes. The PAC facility has a recital hall that seats 216 people, and an Auditorium that has 840 seats. The Judson ISD Performing Arts Center is physically connected to Judson High School via a vestibule.

Judson was named a National Blue Ribbon School in 1999–2000.

== Athletics ==
Judson's athletic programs have experienced state championship success in several sports amassing 10 state championships (6 in football, 3 in track and field, and 1 in basketball).

Football

The Judson Rocket football program emerged as a perennial power in the 1977 season. Judson won its first state championship in 1983.

D.W. Rutledge coached the Rockets until 2000 amassing a record of 198-31-5 taking the Rockets to seven state championship games, and winning four state titles. The football stadium is named after Coach Rutledge in his honor.

After the 2000 season, the team went to the state playoffs in nine of eleven seasons making three championship game appearances and winning one state championship.

Mark Smith, formerly of Kerrville Tivy High School where he coached Heisman Trophy winner Johnny Manziel, assumed head coaching duties at Judson from 2012 through 2013.

Sean McAuliffe, an alumnus of Judson High School and its football program, became the head coach starting with the 2014 season.

Judson offensive coordinator Rodney Williams became head coach in May 2019. In his first season Williams led the Rockets to a regular season record of 9–1, but the team lost to Lake Travis 48–35 in the Region 4 Final, finishing the season at 12–2.

Judson has made it to the playoffs 42 times over 59 total seasons, advanced to the state semifinal level 18 times, reached the state title game 11 times, and won the state championship six times.

Judson holds the all-time Texas state record with 49 consecutive winning seasons from 1977 through 2025. The team last finished with a losing record in 1976 and is a combined 462–106–5 during the streak. The previous record for consecutive winning seasons was 36 set by Plano Senior High School. During the current streak, Judson has won over 80 percent of its games, and the worst record in 44 years is 7–5 with a worst regular season record of 6–4 (happened 4 times).

Years	Record	Winning Percentage
1977 to 2020	462-106-5	81%
1962 to 2020	515-200-10	72%

Judson's season records during the streak from 1977 to 2022 are below.

Year	Record	Coach	Season Result
1977	10–1	Sanders	Lost in bi-district round to San Antonio Holmes 14–21
1978	10–2	Sanders	Lost in regional round to San Antonio Churchill 14–30
1979	10–1	Sanders	Lost in bi-district round to San Antonio Jay 28–0
1980	6–4	Arnold	Missed playoffs
1981	7–3	Arnold	Missed playoffs
1982	14–1	Arnold	State semifinalist losing to Beaumont Westbrook 12–27
1983	15–1	Arnold	State champion defeating Midland Lee 25–21
1984	11–2–1	Rutledge	State quarterfinalist losing to San Antonio Madison 16–19
1985	12–2	Rutledge	State quarterfinalist losing to San Antonio Holmes 29–30
1986	12–1	Rutledge	State quarterfinalist losing to Austin Reagan 15–18
1987	9–1–1	Rutledge	Lost in area championship to state semifinalist Fort Bend Willowridge 17–8
1988	15–1	Rutledge	State champion defeating Dallas Carter 1–0 (Carter won game 31–14 but was later disqualified)
1989	14–1	Rutledge	State semifinalist losing to Aldine 14–48
1990	14–2	Rutledge	State finalist losing to Marshall 19–21
1991	11–3	Rutledge	State semifinalist losing to Fort Bend Dulles 26–27
1992	14–1	Rutledge	State champion defeating Euless Trinity 52–0
1993	13–0–2	Rutledge	State champion defeating Plano 36–13
1994	10–3–1	Rutledge	State semifinalist losing to Katy 19–42
1995	14–1	Rutledge	State champion defeating Odessa Permian 31–28
1996	13–2	Rutledge	State finalist losing to Lewisville 34–58
1997	7–4	Rutledge	Lost in bi-district round to Austin Crockett 15–26
1998	14–1	Rutledge	State finalist losing to Duncanville 21–24
1999	7–3	Rutledge	Missed playoffs
2000	8–3	Rutledge	Lost in bi-district round to Austin Westlake 6–35
2001	9–3	Rackley	Lost in regional round to San Antonio Taft 13–32
2002	14–1	Rackley	State champion defeating Midland 33–32
2003	6–4	Rackley	Missed playoffs
2004	13–1	Rackley	State semifinalist losing to Spring Westfield 14–28
2005	10–5	Rackley	State finalist losing to Euless Trinity 14–28
2006	6–4	Rackley	Missed playoffs
2007	11–5	Rackley	State finalist losing to Euless Trinity 10–13
2008	8–3	Rackley	Lost in bi-district round to San Antonio Stevens 12–14
2009	9–3	Rackley	Lost in area round to Austin Westlake 17–43
2010	7–5	Rackley	Lost in area round to San Antonio Stevens 27–33
2011	8–3	Rackley	Lost in bi-district round to San Antonio Madison 24–25
2012	8–4	Smith	Lost in area round to San Antonio O'Connor 28–34
2013	11–3	Smith	State quarterfinalist losing to San Antonio Madison 29–33
2014	10–5	McAuliffe	State semifinalist losing to Cypress Ranch 31–38
2015	13–2	McAuliffe	State semifinalist losing to Galena Park North Shore 17–23
2016	9–3	McAuliffe	Lost in second round to state quarterfinalist Austin Westlake 21–24
2017	10–2	McAuliffe	Lost in second round to state finalist Austin Lake Travis, 39–47
2018	12–1	McAuliffe	State quarterfinalist losing to state semifinalist Lake Travis 38–21
2019	12–2	Williams	State quarterfinalist losing to state semifinalist Lake Travis 48–35
2020	6–3	Williams	Lost in bi-district round to San Antonio Roosevelt 21–28
2021	4–6	Williams/Joel Call	Missed playoffs
2022	5–7	Soto	Lost in area round to State finalist Austin Vandegrift 7–37
2023	4–8	Soto	Lost in area round to state quarterfinalist Dripping Springs 34–38
2024	4-6	Soto	Missed playoffs
2025	4-7	Soto	Lost in bi district round to Laredo United 0-42

Basketball

The Judson Rocket boys basketball program has been a perennial contender under coach Michael Wacker. Judson has been to the UIL state tournament three times: 1992–1993, 2000–2001, and 2013–2014. In all three instances, Judson lost to the eventual state champion. The Rockets finished the 2014 season with a record of 37–2, the best record in Judson boys basketball history.

Year	Title	Coach	Season Result
1993	State Finalist	Wacker	Lost to Fort Worth Dunbar 74–64
2001	State Semifinalist	Wacker	Lost to Sugar Land Willowridge 67–64 (2OT)
2014	State Finalist	Wacker	Lost to Galena Park North Shore 57–45

Under coach Triva Corrales, the Judson Rocket girls basketball program has been to the UIL state tournament four times (2017–2020) losing to the eventual state champion in 2017, 2018, and 2020. Judson beat Desoto in 2019 to claim its first state title in girls basketball.

Year	Title	Coach	Season Result
2017	State Semifinalist	Corrales	Lost to Duncanville 53–41
2018	State Finalist	Corrales	Lost to Plano 62–58
2019	State Champion	Corrales	Beat Desoto 49–46
2020	State Semifinalist	Corrales	Lost to Duncanville 45–36

Softball

The Judson Rocket girls softball program has emerged as a very competitive program under coach Theresa Urbanovsky. Judson made its first UIL state tournament in 2021. The Rockets finished the 2021 season with a record of 35–3, the best record in Judson girls softball history.

Year	Title	Coach	Season Result
2021	State Finalist	Urbanovsky	Lost to Deer Park 1–0

Track and Field

Judson track and field programs have experienced significant success having won 3 state titles. The boys team won the 2013 Texas 5A state track meet, and the girls team won consecutive Texas 5A/6A state championships in 2014 and 2015.

Year	Title	Coach	Season Result
2013	State Champion	Faught	Won 5A boys state team title
2014	State Champion	Gerbich	Won 5A girls state team title
2015	State Champion	Gerbich	Won 6A girls state team title

Wrestling

The wrestling program has recent individual state titles in the 140 lbs. weight class through Aaron Walker (2010–5th, 2011–1st, 2012–1st).

== Notable alumni ==
- Mike Azzaro (Class of 1983) — former professional polo player
- Eric Brown (Class of 1993) — former NFL safety for the Denver Broncos and Houston Texans
- Tre Flowers (Class of 2013) — former NFL cornerback for the Cincinnati Bengals
- Phillip Gaines (Class of 2009) — former NFL cornerback for the Kansas City Chiefs, Buffalo Bills, Cleveland Browns and the Houston Texans
- Derwin Gray (Class of 1989) — evangelist and former NFL defensive back for the Indianapolis Colts and Carolina Panthers
- Otis Grigsby (Class of 1999) — former NFL defensive end for the Miami Dolphins and Minnesota Vikings
- Anthony Hutchison (Class of 1978) — former NFL running back for the Cincinnati Bengals and Buffalo Bills
- Rob Housler (Class of 2006) — former NFL tight end who has played for the Arizona Cardinals, Cleveland Browns, Chicago Bears and New England Patriots
- Mike Jinks (Class of 1990) — college football coach; former head football coach at Bowling Green State University
- Tanner Leissner (Class of 2014) - basketball player who plays professionally in Japan
- Bert Richardson (Class of 1974) — judge on the Texas Court of Criminal Appeals and a San Antonio lawyer
- Corey Sears (Class of 1991) — former NFL defensive end for the Houston Texans, St. Louis Rams, and Arizona Cardinals
- Karen Wagner (Class of 1979) — former officer in the United States Army; died at the Pentagon in the September 11 attacks, namesake for Karen Wagner High School
- Jarveon Williams (Class of 2013) — former NFL running back for the Cincinnati Bengals
- DeMarvin Leal (Class of 2019) — NFL defensive end for the Pittsburgh Steelers
