= Otis Grigsby =

American football player (born 1980)

No. 98, 73
- Position: Defensive end

Personal information
- Born: November 19, 1980 (age 45); San Antonio, Texas, U.S.
- Listed height: 6 ft 3 in (1.91 m)
- Listed weight: 262 lb (119 kg)

Career information
- High school: Judson (Converse, Texas)
- College: Kentucky
- NFL draft: 2003: undrafted

Career history
- Miami Dolphins (2003); Atlanta Falcons (2005)*; Cologne Centurions (2006); Carolina Panthers (2006–2007); Minnesota Vikings (2007–2008)
- * Offseason or practice squad member only

Career NFL statistics
- Total tackles: 2
- Sacks: 1
- Stats at Pro Football Reference

Otis Wayne Grigsby Jr. (born November 19, 1980) is an American former professional football player who was a defensive end in the National Football League (NFL). He was signed by the Miami Dolphins as an undrafted free agent in 2003. He played college football for the Kentucky Wildcats.

Grigsby was also a member of the Atlanta Falcons, Cologne Centurions, Carolina Panthers, and Minnesota Vikings.

== Early life ==
Grigsby attended Judson High School in Converse, Texas and was a student and a letterman in football and basketball. In football, as a senior, he started as a linebacker and was a first-team All-State selection. In basketball, he was an All-District Honorable Mention selection and an All-City selection. Grigsby graduated from Judson High School in the top 10 percent of his class.

== College career ==
Grigsby in 45 games and started 18 at Kentucky and notched 10.0 sacks during collegiate career.

== Professional career ==
In 2007, he played in eight regular season games—four with Carolina and the final four games of the season with Minnesota. He made his presence felt immediately with the Vikings, notching a 4th-quarter sack of former Vikings QB Shaun Hill at San Francisco (12/9), his 1st career sack, and forced a fumble on the play that was recovered by fellow lineman Spencer Johnson he played in 1st NFL game of his career in the opener at St. Louis (9/9) as a Panther.

In 2006, he spent final two weeks of regular season on Panthers practice squad. He went to training camp with Carolina but was waived on 8/29/06. In 2005, he went to training camp with Atlanta but was waived on 8/26/05. In 2004, he spent training camp with Miami but was released in final roster cuts on 9/5/04. In 2003, he entered NFL as a rookie free agent with the Dolphins. He was inactive for all 16 games with Miami on a team that went 10–6 but did not make the playoffs under head coach Dave Wannstedt.
