= Keesling Branch =

Stream in the American state of Missouri

Coordinates: 37°41′53″N 90°49′42″W

Keesling Branch is a stream in Iron County in the U.S. state of Missouri. It is a tributary to Cedar Creek.

The stream crosses under Missouri Route 32 at the community of Banner approximately one half mile above its confluence with Cedar Creek.

Keesling Branch has the name of M. H. Keesling, the original owner of the site.

== See also ==
- List of rivers of Missouri
