= Anthony Hutchison =

American football player (born 1961)

No. 32, 30
- Position: Running back

Personal information
- Born: February 4, 1961 (age 65); Houston, Texas, U.S.
- Listed height: 5 ft 10 in (1.78 m)
- Listed weight: 186 lb (84 kg)

Career information
- High school: Judson (Converse, Texas)
- College: Texas Tech
- NFL draft: 1983: 10th round, 256th overall pick

Career history
- Chicago Bears (1983–1984); Buffalo Bills (1985)

Career NFL statistics
- Rushing yards: 63
- Rushing average: 2.9
- Rushing touchdowns: 2
- Stats at Pro Football Reference

Anthony LaRue Hutchison (born February 4, 1961) is an American former professional football player who was a running back in the National Football League (NFL) for the Chicago Bears and Buffalo Bills. He played college football for the Texas Tech Red Raiders. He was selected as the fifth pick in the tenth round of the 1983 NFL draft by the Bears, the 256th pick overall.

His professional football career ended in 1985, and Hutchinson started a landscaping company in Texas. In December 1989, in one of the nation's first federal prosecutions regarding knowingly hiring illegal aliens, Hutchinson and one of his employees were convicted of multiple charges related to employing illegal aliens. In March 1990, Hutchinson was sentenced to 60 days in jail, eight months of home detention, and a $2,000 fine.
