= Ratledge =

Ratledge is an Anglo-Scottish surname. Notable people with the surname include:

- Colin Ratledge (born 1936), British biochemist
- John Ratledge (born 1974), English cricketer
- Mike Ratledge (1943–2025), British musician
- Miles Ratledge (born 1967), founding member of the band Napalm Death
- Tate Ratledge (born 2001), American football player

== See also ==
- Routledge (surname)
- Rutledge (disambiguation)
