= McClurg Branch =

Stream in the American state of Missouri

McClurg Branch is a stream in Iron County in the U.S. state of Missouri. It is a tributary of Cedar Creek.

The stream headwaters arise around 37°39′26″N 90°47′28″W at an elevation of around 1320 feet. The stream flows northwest and then north to its confluence at 37°42′18″N 90°48′54″W and an elevation of 968 feet. The stream valley is also known as Coon Hollow. The confluence is just south of Missouri Route 32 about one mile east of the community of Banner. Belleview is about five miles to the east.

McClurg Branch has the name of Jake McClurg, an early settler.

== See also ==
- List of rivers of Missouri
