= Mike Jinks =

American football player and coach (born 1972)

Biographical details
- Born: February 7, 1972 (age 54)

Playing career
- 1990–1993: Angelo State
- Position: Quarterback

Coaching career (HC unless noted)
- 1996–1997: Ellison HS (TX) (QB)
- 1998: Judson HS (TX) (QB)
- 1999: David Crockett HS (TX) (OC)
- 2000–2001: Galena Park HS (TX) (OC)
- 2002–2004: Robert E. Lee HS (TX) (OC)
- 2005: Luther Burbank HS (TX)
- 2006–2012: Steele HS (TX)
- 2013–2014: Texas Tech (RB)
- 2015: Texas Tech (AHC/RB)
- 2016–2018: Bowling Green
- 2019–2021: USC (RB)
- 2022–2023: Houston (RB)

Head coaching record
- Overall: 79–25 (high school); 7–24 (college)

Accomplishments and honors

Championships
- Texas Class 5A Division II (2010)

Awards
- National High School Coach of the Year Finalist (2012); U.S. Army All-American Bowl Coach (2012)

Michael Troy Jinks (born February 7, 1972) is an American football coach who last served as the running backs coach for Houston. Jinks served as the head football coach at Bowling Green State University from 2016 until midway through the 2018 season, before becoming the running backs coach at the University of Southern California. Previously he was an assistant head coach and running backs coach at Texas Tech University.

== Early life ==
Jinks was born on February 7, 1972. He played quarterback for three years at Judson High School in Converse, Texas before graduating in 1990. After high school, Jinks played college football at the NCAA Division II level for Angelo State. He was their starting quarterback for two years, and graduated with a bachelor's degree in Kinesiology with a minor in Mathematics.

== Coaching career ==
=== High school ===
Jinks' coaching career began in 1995 when he was working as a waiter in a restaurant in San Angelo, Texas. He was serving a table full of coaches from Ellison High School and was offered a job as the quarterbacks coach there. Short on funds, Jinks received a loan from his former coach at Angelo State, Jerry Vandergriff, to earn his teacher certification and move to Killeen, Texas.

Jinks became the quarterbacks coach at his former alma mater Judson High School in 1998. Following that, he was the offensive coordinator at David Crockett High School, Galena Park High School, and Robert E. Lee High School. He accepted his first head coaching position at Burbank High School in San Antonio, Texas in 2005.

In 2005, Jinks became the head coach for Steele High School in Cibolo, Texas eight months before the school was initially opened. Jinks lead the new football program at Steele to a win in the 2010 Class 5A Division II Texas state championship featuring all-state and future NFL running back Malcolm Brown. In 2011, Jinks' team made it to the finals of the Class 5A Division II state championship before losing to a Spring Dekaney HS squad coached by Danny Amendola's father, Willie Amendola. In 2012, another powerhouse Steele team made it to the state semifinals, only to fall to eventual state champion Katy High School. Following the conclusion of the 2012 season, Jinks was named the head coach for the West-team of the 2012 U.S. Army All-American Bowl and was a finalist for the 2013 Xenith National High School Coach of the Year Award. Jinks left Steele with a win–loss record of 77–17. In his last three seasons there, Jinks compiled a record of 43–4.

While at Steele, Jinks coached High School All-American and future Texas Longhorns running back Malcolm Brown.

=== College ===
On January 9, 2013, it was announced that Jinks accepted the position of running backs coach for Texas Tech under head coach Kliff Kingsbury. In January 2015, Jinks was promoted to associate head coach in addition to his running back coaching duties with the announcement of the hiring of new defensive coordinator David Gibbs. In 2014, running back Deandre Washington became Texas Tech's first 1,000 yard rusher since 1998 and earned All-Big 12 Second Team honors. Washington led the Big 12 Conference in rushing yards and earned an All-Big 12 Conference 1st Team selection in 2015.

Jinks was named head coach at Bowling Green on December 8, 2015.

On October 14, 2018, Jinks was fired after two and a half seasons at Bowling Green.

== Head coaching record ==
=== College ===
Year	Team	Overall	Conference	Standing	Bowl/playoffs
Bowling Green Falcons (Mid-American Conference) (2016–2018)
2016	Bowling Green	4–8	3–5	T–3rd (East)	
2017	Bowling Green	2–10	2–6	5th (East)	
2018	Bowling Green	1–6 (Note: Jinks served as Bowling Green's head coach for the first seven games of the 2018 season before he was fired. Carl Pelini was appointed interim head coach and led the team for the final five games of the season. Bowling Green finished the year with an overall record of 3–9 and a mark of 2–6 in conference play, tying for fourth place in the East Division of the Mid-American Conference.)	0–3	(East)	
Bowling Green:		7–24	5–14		
Total:		7–24			
