= Phillip Gaines =

American football player (born 1991)

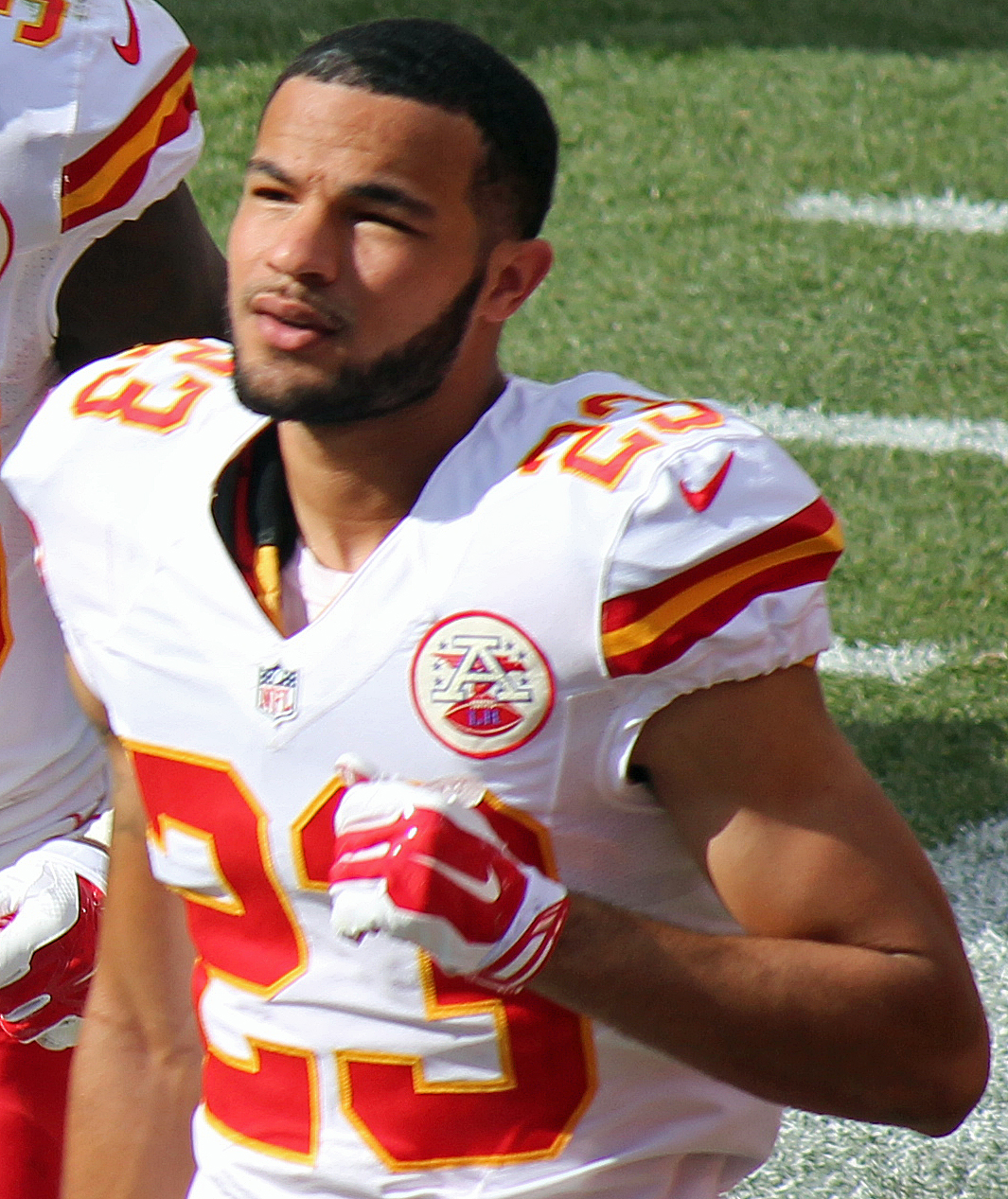
- Gaines with the Kansas City Chiefs in 2014

No. 23, 28, 33, 29
- Position: Cornerback

Personal information
- Born: April 4, 1991 (age 35); Concord, Massachusetts, U.S.
- Listed height: 6 ft 0 in (1.83 m)
- Listed weight: 193 lb (88 kg)

Career information
- High school: Judson (Converse, Texas)
- College: Rice
- NFL draft: 2014: 3rd round, 87th overall pick

Career history
- Kansas City Chiefs (2014–2017); Buffalo Bills (2018); Cleveland Browns (2018); Houston Texans (2019–2020)

Awards and highlights
- First-team All-Conference USA (2012, 2013)

Career NFL statistics
- Total tackles: 152
- Forced fumbles: 2
- Pass deflections: 18
- Interceptions: 1
- Stats at Pro Football Reference

Phillip Gaines (born April 4, 1991) is an American former professional football player who was a cornerback in the National Football League (NFL). He was selected by the Kansas City Chiefs in the third round of the 2014 NFL draft. He played college football for the Rice Owls.

== Early life ==
Gaines attended Judson High School in Converse, Texas, where he played football and ran track. He totalled 110 tackles and four interceptions during his two seasons, and blocked five kicks as a senior, leading Judson to the state title game played at Rice Stadium. Academically, he had a 3.7 grade point average.

As a track and field athlete, Gaines was ranked as one of the top 110-meter hurdlers in the state as a senior. As a junior, he ran a leg on Judson's 4 × 100 m relay squad that finished third at the state track meet, with a school-record time of 40.91 seconds. At the 2009 Texas Relays, he placed 7th in the 110-meter hurdles with a PR time of 14.09 seconds. He took silver in the long jump at the 2009 Converse Wagner Meet, with a leap of 6.70 meters (21 ft 11 in). He recorded a personal-best time of 38.54 seconds in the 300-meter hurdles at the 2009 District 27-5A Meet, winning the event.

Gaines was regarded as a two-star recruit by Rivals.com. Gaines first got his recognition while starring in high school as the overall mvp at the national underclassmen combine and showcase hosted by NUCSports.com and David Schuman

== College career ==
Gaines attended Rice University from 2009 to 2013. As a true freshman, he played in nine games, starting six, before an injury vs. SMU ended his season. He recorded 28 total tackles and broke up three passes. In 2010, he played in all 12 games, recording 64 tackles, including two for loss, and six pass break ups. In 2011, he played in only five games, including three starts, before sustaining an injury at Southern Miss, and was given a medical redshirt. In 2012, he started all 13 games, recording 33 tackles, and 18 pass break ups, which led the Conference USA (C-USA) and was second nationally, and earned himself consensus C-USA honors. In 2013, he was named the Conference USA Pre-season Defensive Player of the Year. He was suspended for the opening game of the season vs. Texas A&M, due to violation of team rules. He went on to start the next 12 games of the season, recording 36 tackles, including four for loss, four interceptions and nine pass break ups, and was named first team All-C-USA for the second consecutive season.

Gaines set a school record by breaking up 38 passes in his career.

== Professional career ==
=== Pre-draft ===
On January 11, 2014, it was reported that Gaines had accepted his invitation to play in the 2014 East–West Shrine Game. On January 18, 2014, Gaines recorded one solo tackle and led both teams with three pass break ups to help former Atlanta Falcons' head coach Jerry Glanville's East team defeat the West 23–13. Gaines was one of 38 cornerbacks and 59 collegiate defensive backs to receive an invitation to perform at the NFL Scouting Combine in Indianapolis, Indiana. He had a spectacular performance at the combine and completed all of the combine and positional drills. He tied TCU's Jason Verrett for the second best 40-yard dash time among defensive backs at the combine, finishing only behind Oklahoma State's Justin Gilbert. Gaines also finished second in the three-cone drill among his position group behind Oregon's Terrance Mitchell. On March 17, 2014, Gaines opted to participate at Rice's pro day, along with ten other prospects. He chose to stand on his combine numbers and only ran positional drills for scouts and team representatives from 23 NFL teams. Gaines had private visits or workouts with the Buffalo Bills, Pittsburgh Steelers, Cincinnati Bengals, Tampa Bay Buccaneers, New York Giants, and Miami Dolphins.

At the conclusion of the pre-draft process, Gaines received multiple different draft projections, varying from a projection as early as the second round (NFLDraftScout.com and Bleacher Report) to as late as the fourth or fifth round (NFL.com). He was ranked as the seventh best cornerback prospect in the draft by NFLDraftScout.com.

Pre-draft measurables
Height	Weight	Arm length	Hand span	Wingspan	40-yard dash	10-yard split	20-yard split	20-yard shuttle	Three-cone drill	Vertical jump	Broad jump	Bench press
6 ft 0 3/8 in (1.84 m)	193 lb (88 kg)	31 7/8 in (0.81 m)	9 5/8 in (0.24 m)	6 ft 3 5/8 in (1.92 m)	4.38 s	1.49 s	2.57 s	4.04 s	6.62 s	36.5 in (0.93 m)	10 ft 2 in (3.10 m)	11 reps
All values from NFL Combine

=== Kansas City Chiefs ===
==== 2014 ====
The Kansas City Chiefs selected Gaines in the third round (87th overall) of the 2014 NFL draft. He was the eighth cornerback selected in 2014. On May 15, 2014, the Chiefs signed him to a four-year, $2.82 million contract that includes a signing bonus of $549,112.

Throughout his first training camp, he competed with Brandon Flowers, Chris Owens, Marcus Cooper, Jamell Fleming, and Ron Parker for a job as the starting cornerback. Head coach Andy Reid named him the sixth cornerback on the depth chart to start the regular season, behind Sean Smith, Cooper, Owens, Parker, and Fleming. He made his professional regular season debut in the Chiefs' season-opening 26-10 loss to the Tennessee Titans. On September 24, 2014, he recorded his first career tackle and finished with two combined tackles during a 34–15 win at the Miami Dolphins.

On October 5, 2014, Gaines suffered a concussion during a 22–17 loss at the San Francisco 49ers. The following game, he earned his first career start as the nickelback after Chris Owens was unable to play due to an injury. He completed the 23–20 victory at the San Diego Chargers with one pass deflection. On November 16, 2014, Gaines earned his third career start and collected a season-high five solo tackles in the Chiefs 24–20 victory against the Seattle Seahawks. Gaines started in place of Cooper who was benched after an underwhelming performance while replacing Fleming who suffered a hamstring injury. On December 10, 2014, Gaines suffered a concussion during practice and remained in the concussion protocol for the Chiefs' 31–13 victory against the Oakland Raiders. He went on to miss Weeks 16-17 with an unspecified illness. Gaines finished his rookie season in 2014 with 20 combined tackles and four pass deflections in five starts and 13 games.

==== 2015 ====
Gaines entered training camp facing major competition for the starting cornerback job against 2015 first round pick Marcus Peters, Cooper, Fleming, and Sanders Commings. Head coach Andy Reid named him the starting cornerback, along with the rookie Peters, after Smith was suspended for the first three games due to a violation of the league's substance abuse policy.

On September 17, 2015, Gaines recorded a season-high four combined tackles during a 31–24 loss to the Denver Broncos. The following game, he recorded two solo tackles in a 38–28 loss at the Green Bay Packers, but left in the first quarter after tearing his ACL. On September 30, 2015, he was placed on injured reserve for the remainder of the season. Gaines finished the 2015 season with six combined tackles (five solo) in three games and three starts.

==== 2016 ====
Gaines competed against Steven Nelson, Kenneth Acker, KeiVarae Russell, and Eric Murray for the starting cornerback job left by the departure of Smith during free agency to the Raiders. He was named the starting cornerback opposite Peters to start the 2016 season.

On September 25, 2016, Gaines a recorded season-high seven solo tackles and forced a fumble in the Chiefs' 24–3 victory over the New York Jets. Unfortunately, he left in the fourth quarter after suffering a knee injury related to his ACL tear and was unable to play in the Chiefs' Week 4 game where they defeated the Steelers 43–14. On October 30, he made four solo tackles, deflected two passes, and had his first career interception off of a pass attempt by Indianapolis Colts quarterback Andrew Luck during a 30–14 victory. He missed four more games throughout the season and lost his starting cornerback job to Nelson and Mitchell. He finished the 2016 season with a total of 44 combined tackles (42 solo), seven pass deflections, and an interception in 11 games and five starts.

==== 2017 ====
Gaines competed with Nelson, Mitchell, D. J. White, and Acker in training camp for the job as the starting cornerback. He was named the backup behind Peters, Mitchell, and Acker.

In the Chiefs' season-opener at the New England Patriots, Gaines recorded four solo tackles in their 42–27 victory. On October 8, 2016, he made his first start of the season and collected three combined tackles during a 42–34 win over the Houston Texans. The next game, Gaines made a season-high five combined tackles as Kansas City lost 19–13 to the Pittsburgh Steelers. He played in 14 games with three starts before suffering a dislocated elbow in Week 17. Gaines was placed on injured reserve on January 3, 2018. After the season, he became a free agent for the first time in his career.

=== Buffalo Bills ===
On March 29, 2018, the Buffalo Bills signed Gaines to a one-year, $835,000 contract. He played in seven games, starting six, before being released on November 6.

=== Cleveland Browns ===
On November 7, 2018, Gaines was claimed off waivers by the Cleveland Browns.

The Browns re-signed Gaines on March 19, 2019. He was placed on injured reserve on August 31. Gaines was released from injured reserve with an injury settlement on September 7.

=== Houston Texans ===
On September 10, 2019, Gaines was signed by the Houston Texans. He was placed on injured reserve on October 21.

On March 18, 2020, Gaines re-signed with the Texans.

== NFL statistics ==
Season		Games		Tackles				Fumbles			Interceptions					
Year	Team	GP	GS	COMB	TOT	AST	SACK	FF	FR	YDS	PD	INT	YDS	AVG	LNG	TD
2014	KC	13	5	20	20	0	0.0	0	0	0	4	0	0	0	0	0
2015	KC	3	3	6	5	1	0.0	0	0	0	0	0	0	0	0	0
2016	KC	11	5	44	42	2	0.0	2	0	0	7	1	0	0	0	0
2017	KC	14	3	30	23	7	0.0	0	0	0	3	0	0	0	0	0
2018	BUF	7	6	30	24	6	0.0	0	0	0	2	0	0	0	0	0
2018	CLE	4	0	9	7	2	0.0	0	0	0	0	0	0	0	0	0
Career		52	22	139	121	18	0.0	2	0	0	16	1	0	0	0	0
