= 2018 Arkansas Attorney General election =

- November 6, 2018
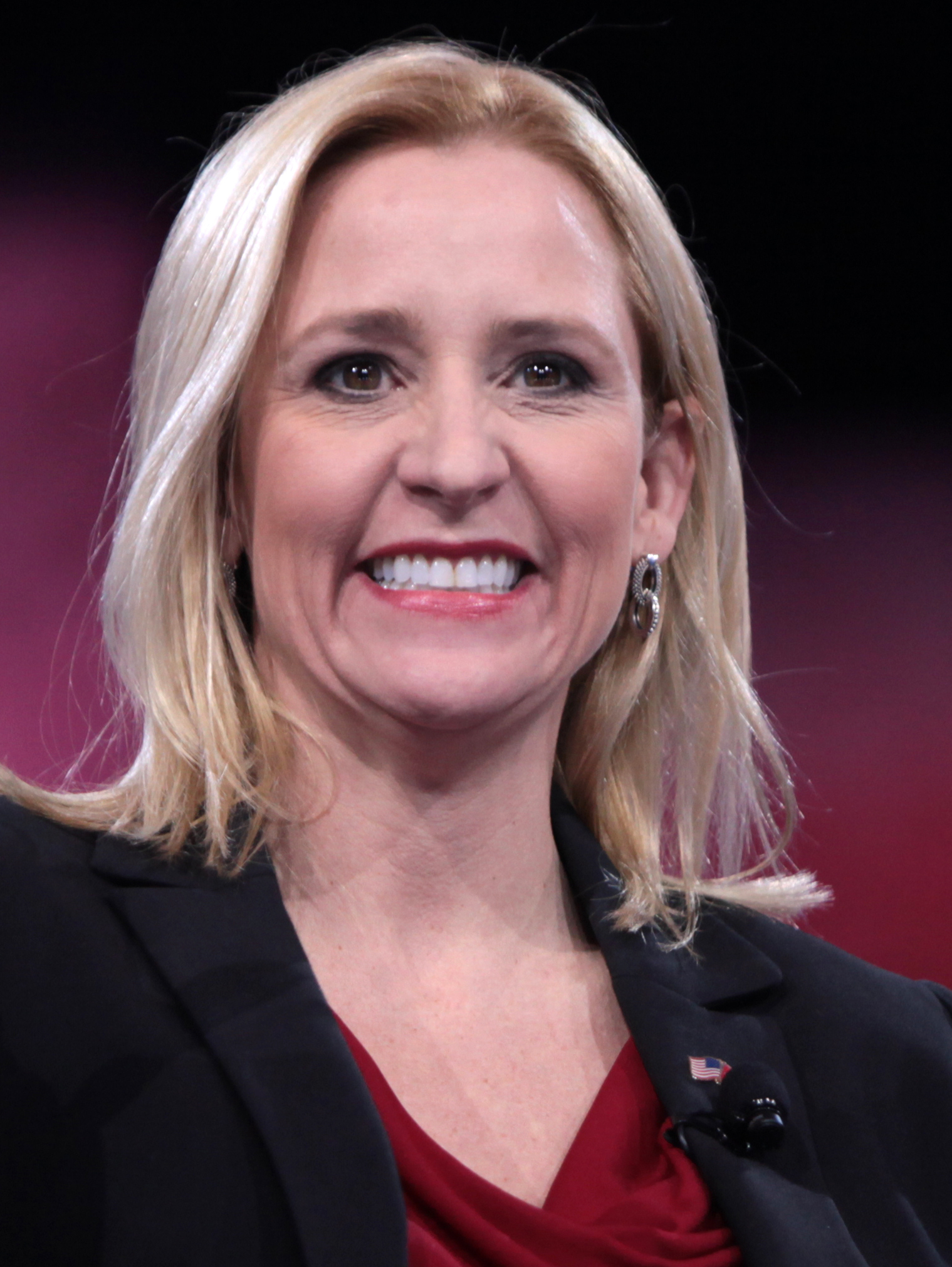

Nominee	Leslie Rutledge	Mike Lee
Party	Republican	Democratic
Popular vote	549,668	315,099
Percentage	61.80%	35.43%
- Rutledge: 40–50% 50–60% 60–70% 70–80% 80–90% Lee: 50–60%
Attorney General before election
Leslie Rutledge
Republican
Elected Attorney General
Leslie Rutledge
Republican

The 2018 Arkansas Attorney General election was held on November 6, 2018, to elect the attorney general of Arkansas. Incumbent Republican Attorney General Leslie Rutledge was re-elected to a second term in office, defeating Democratic challenger Mike Lee in a landslide.

== Republican primary ==
=== Candidates ===
==== Nominee ====
- Leslie Rutledge, incumbent attorney general (2015–2023)

== Democratic primary ==
=== Candidates ===
==== Nominee ====
- Mike Lee, attorney

== Libertarian primary ==
=== Candidates ===
==== Nominee ====
- Kerry Hicks

== General election ==
=== Predictions ===
Source	Ranking	As of
Governing	Safe R	October 26, 2018

=== Results ===
2018 Arkansas Attorney General election
Party	Candidate	Votes	%	±%
Republican	Leslie Rutledge (incumbent)	549,668	61.80	+10.19
Democratic	Mike Lee	315,099	35.43	–7.78
Libertarian	Kerry Hicks	24,652	2.77	–2.41
Total votes		889,419	100.00	N/A
Republican hold				

==== By county ====
County	Leslie Rutledge Republican		Mike Lee Democratic		Kerry Hicks Libertarian		Margin		Total
County	#	%	#	%	#	%	#	%	Total
Arkansas	3,348	67.54%	1,515	30.56%	94	1.90%	1,833	36.98%	4,957
Ashley	4,133	67.16%	1,918	31.17%	103	1.67%	2,215	35.99%	6,154
Baxter	10,514	73.45%	3,258	22.76%	543	3.79%	7,256	50.69%	14,315
Benton	50,345	65.21%	24,108	31.22%	2,757	3.57%	26,237	33.98%	77,210
Boone	8,941	77.18%	2,354	20.32%	290	2.50%	6,587	56.86%	11,585
Bradley	1,823	63.50%	979	34.10%	69	2.40%	844	29.40%	2,871
Calhoun	1,267	71.14%	480	26.95%	34	1.91%	787	44.19%	1,781
Carroll	5,517	61.59%	3,176	35.46%	264	2.95%	2,341	26.14%	8,957
Chicot	1,523	42.94%	1,976	55.71%	48	1.35%	-453	-12.77%	3,547
Clark	3,708	55.00%	2,901	43.03%	133	1.97%	807	11.97%	6,742
Clay	2,983	72.53%	1,019	24.78%	111	2.70%	1,964	47.75%	4,113
Cleburne	7,710	80.02%	1,689	17.53%	236	2.45%	6,021	62.49%	9,635
Cleveland	1,993	76.95%	549	21.20%	48	1.85%	1,444	55.75%	2,590
Columbia	3,978	62.88%	2,256	35.66%	92	1.45%	1,722	27.22%	6,326
Conway	4,014	62.13%	2,291	35.46%	156	2.41%	1,723	26.67%	6,461
Craighead	16,934	65.07%	8,411	32.32%	680	2.61%	8,523	32.75%	26,025
Crawford	12,735	75.60%	3,591	21.32%	519	3.08%	9,144	54.28%	16,845
Crittenden	5,457	45.72%	6,267	52.51%	212	1.78%	-810	-6.79%	11,936
Cross	3,962	68.30%	1,698	29.27%	141	2.43%	2,264	39.03%	5,801
Dallas	1,251	59.23%	827	39.16%	34	1.61%	424	20.08%	2,112
Desha	1,708	49.32%	1,676	48.40%	79	2.28%	32	0.92%	3,463
Drew	3,422	63.36%	1,877	34.75%	102	1.89%	1,545	28.61%	5,401
Faulkner	24,241	63.03%	12,973	33.73%	1,245	3.24%	11,268	29.30%	38,459
Franklin	3,979	75.32%	1,158	21.92%	146	2.76%	2,821	53.40%	5,283
Fulton	2,664	69.81%	1,031	27.02%	121	3.17%	1,633	42.79%	3,816
Garland	20,680	65.13%	10,211	32.16%	859	2.71%	10,469	32.97%	31,750
Grant	4,326	77.88%	1,110	19.98%	119	2.14%	3,216	57.89%	5,555
Greene	8,165	74.61%	2,496	22.81%	282	2.58%	5,669	51.80%	10,943
Hempstead	3,175	64.05%	1,708	34.46%	74	1.49%	1,467	29.59%	4,957
Hot Spring	6,136	70.22%	2,374	27.17%	228	2.61%	3,762	43.05%	8,738
Howard	2,377	67.61%	1,085	30.86%	54	1.54%	1,292	36.75%	3,516
Independence	7,823	77.07%	2,070	20.39%	257	2.53%	5,753	56.68%	10,150
Izard	3,403	76.20%	957	21.43%	106	2.37%	2,446	54.77%	4,466
Jackson	2,880	69.08%	1,199	28.76%	90	2.16%	1,681	40.32%	4,169
Jefferson	7,912	40.01%	11,446	57.88%	419	2.12%	-3,534	-17.87%	19,777
Johnson	5,199	69.79%	2,030	27.25%	221	2.97%	3,169	42.54%	7,450
Lafayette	1,321	61.99%	773	36.27%	37	1.74%	548	25.72%	2,131
Lawrence	3,452	74.09%	1,072	23.01%	135	2.90%	2,380	51.08%	4,659
Lee	880	41.71%	1,197	56.73%	33	1.56%	-317	-15.02%	2,110
Lincoln	2,077	68.57%	902	29.78%	50	1.65%	1,175	38.79%	3,029
Little River	2,664	67.87%	1,179	30.04%	82	2.09%	1,485	37.83%	3,925
Logan	4,117	74.60%	1,232	22.32%	170	3.08%	2,885	52.27%	5,519
Lonoke	15,217	73.94%	4,765	23.15%	599	2.91%	10,452	50.78%	20,581
Madison	3,919	70.88%	1,444	26.12%	166	3.00%	2,475	44.76%	5,529
Marion	3,875	75.23%	1,130	21.94%	146	2.83%	2,745	53.29%	5,151
Miller	8,169	71.46%	3,097	27.09%	165	1.44%	5,072	44.37%	11,431
Mississippi	6,010	57.61%	4,160	39.87%	263	2.52%	1,850	17.73%	10,433
Monroe	1,383	52.49%	1,188	45.09%	64	2.43%	195	7.40%	2,635
Montgomery	2,153	75.81%	625	22.01%	62	2.18%	1,528	53.80%	2,840
Nevada	1,553	61.87%	911	36.29%	46	1.83%	642	25.58%	2,510
Newton	2,353	76.25%	643	20.84%	90	2.92%	1,710	55.41%	3,086
Ouachita	3,998	54.07%	3,276	44.31%	120	1.62%	722	9.76%	7,394
Perry	2,617	70.83%	957	25.90%	121	3.27%	1,660	44.93%	3,695
Phillips	2,134	39.27%	3,212	59.11%	88	1.62%	-1,078	-19.84%	5,434
Pike	2,630	78.58%	640	19.12%	77	2.30%	1,990	59.46%	3,347
Poinsett	4,396	72.26%	1,548	25.44%	140	2.30%	2,848	46.81%	6,084
Polk	4,852	80.21%	1,010	16.70%	187	3.09%	3,842	63.51%	6,049
Pope	13,145	73.26%	4,269	23.79%	529	2.95%	8,876	49.47%	17,943
Prairie	2,139	74.97%	668	23.41%	46	1.61%	1,471	51.56%	2,853
Pulaski	53,561	39.92%	76,855	57.29%	3,743	2.79%	-23,294	-17.36%	134,159
Randolph	4,105	72.95%	1,314	23.35%	208	3.70%	2,791	49.60%	5,627
Saline	29,172	70.39%	11,142	26.89%	1,128	2.72%	18,030	43.51%	41,442
Scott	2,263	79.18%	483	16.90%	112	3.92%	1,780	62.28%	2,858
Searcy	2,522	79.48%	556	17.52%	95	2.99%	1,966	61.96%	3,173
Sebastian	22,364	67.47%	9,676	29.19%	1,106	3.34%	12,688	38.28%	33,146
Sevier	2,338	72.88%	781	24.35%	89	2.77%	1,557	48.53%	3,208
Sharp	4,311	76.11%	1,210	21.36%	143	2.52%	3,101	54.75%	5,664
St. Francis	2,550	43.87%	3,157	54.32%	105	1.81%	-607	-10.44%	5,812
Stone	3,305	74.32%	1,025	23.05%	117	2.63%	2,280	51.27%	4,447
Union	7,687	62.47%	4,220	34.29%	399	3.24%	3,467	28.17%	12,306
Van Buren	4,630	73.78%	1,417	22.58%	228	3.63%	3,213	51.20%	6,275
Washington	33,459	50.97%	30,251	46.08%	1,937	2.95%	3,208	4.89%	65,647
White	17,093	77.62%	4,306	19.55%	623	2.83%	12,787	58.06%	22,022
Woodruff	1,144	54.71%	887	42.42%	60	2.87%	257	12.29%	2,091
Yell	3,884	73.03%	1,257	23.64%	177	3.33%	2,627	49.40%	5,318
Totals	549,668	61.80%	315,099	35.43%	24,652	2.77%	234,569	26.37%	889,419

Counties that flipped from Democratic to Republican

- Arkansas (largest city: Stuttgart)
- Clark (largest city: Arkadelphia)
- Clay (largest city: Piggott)
- Conway (largest city: Morrilton)
- Cross (largest city: Wynne)
- Dallas (largest city: Fordyce)
- Desha (largest city: Dumas)
- Drew (largest city: Monticello)
- Howard (largest city: Nashville)
- Jackson (largest city: Newport)
- Mississippi (largest city: Blytheville)
- Monroe (largest city: Brinkley)
- Nevada (largest city: Prescott)
- Ouachita (largest city: Camden)
- Pike (largest city: Glenwood)
- Sevier (largest city: De Queen)
- Woodruff (largest city: Augusta)

==== By congressional district ====
Rutledge won all four congressional districts.

District	Rutledge	Lee	Representative
1st	67%	31%	Rick Crawford
2nd	54%	44%	French Hill
3rd	63%	34%	Steve Womack
4th	66%	32%	Bruce Westerman

== See also ==
- 2018 United States attorney general elections
- 2018 Arkansas elections
