= Attorney General Rutledge =

Attorney General Rutledge may refer to:

- Arthur Rutledge (1843–1917), Attorney General of Queensland
- Leslie Rutledge (born 1976), Attorney General of Arkansas
