= D. W. Rutledge =

American football player and coach

Biographical details
- Born: c. 1951; Houston, Texas

Playing career
- 1971–1974: Texas Lutheran
- Position: Linebacker

Coaching career (HC unless noted)
- 1980–1983: Judson HS (TX) (DC)
- 1984–2000: Judson HS (TX)

Head coaching record
- Overall: 198–31–5

Accomplishments and honors

Championships
- 4 Texas 5A (1988, 1992, 1993, 1995)

D. W. Rutledge is a former high school football coach and current executive director of the Texas High School Coaches Association. Rutledge is one of the most successful coaches in Texas high school football history, winning four state championships in the state's highest classification.

A native of Houston, Texas, Rutledge attended Sam Houston High School and later the Texas Lutheran University, where he captained the school's 1974 NAIA Division II National Championship team and was a Kodak All-American linebacker for head coach Jim Wacker. Upon his graduation in 1975, he made several stops, following his college football coach, James Wacker, from school to school, over the course of five years before finally becoming an assistant coach at Judson High School in Converse, Texas in 1980, serving as defensive coordinator for the 1983 5A state championship squad. Rutledge was named head coach in 1984, guiding Converse Judson to a 198–31–5 record in 17 seasons.

Rutledge co-authored a book titled Coaching To Change Lives with Dennis Parker, former offensive coordinator at Converse Judson. The Judson football stadium in Converse was renamed in his honor.

In 2019, Chris Doelle and Dr. Charles Breithaupt authored a biography of D.W. Rutledge that included the results of every game he coached as well as countless stories from his coworkers, athletes and family members. The book Rocket Man: The Story of D.W. Rutledge and the Judson High School Football Dynasty featured a foreword by Grant Teaff.
