= Routledge (surname) =

Family name

- Pronunciation: /ˈraʊtlɪdʒ, ˈraʊtlɛdʒ/ ROWT-lij, ROWT-lej
- Language: Old English

Origin
- Region of origin: England, Scotland (Anglo-Scottish border region)

Other names
- Variant forms: Rutledge, Ratledge, Ruttledge, Rutlidge

Routledge is an Anglo-Scottish surname.

== Variants ==
Common variant spellings include Rutledge, Ratledge, Ruttledge and Rutlidge. Dozens of other spellings are attested in historical records. (Note: (in alphabetical order) de Rotheluch, de Routlug, de Routluge, Ratlege, Ratlish, Rettleg, Reutledge, Rookledge, Rootledge, Rootlidge, Rootlige, Rotheloige, Rotheluche, Rotheluge, Rouchelug, Rouchlig, Roucleshe, Roulluche, Routelych, Routelyech, Routhedge, Routlach, Routlache, Routlage, Routlagh, Routlaige, Routleach, Routlech, Routleche, Routledg, Routlege, Routleidge, Routleische, Routlesche, Routlich, Routlisch, Routlishe, Routlug, Rowledge, Rowlidg, Rowlidge, Rowteleage, Rowtelege, Rowtlage, Rowtleache, Rowtledg, Rowtledge, Rowtlege, Rowtleisch, Rowtleische, Rowtleyche, Rowtlidge, Rowtlugh, Rudleage, Rudleche, Rudlege, Ruthlidge, Rutlage, Rutleedge, Rutlege, Rutleidge, Rutlethe, Rutley, Rutliche, Rutlige, Rutlish, Ruttidge, Ruttlig, Ruttlisge)

== History ==
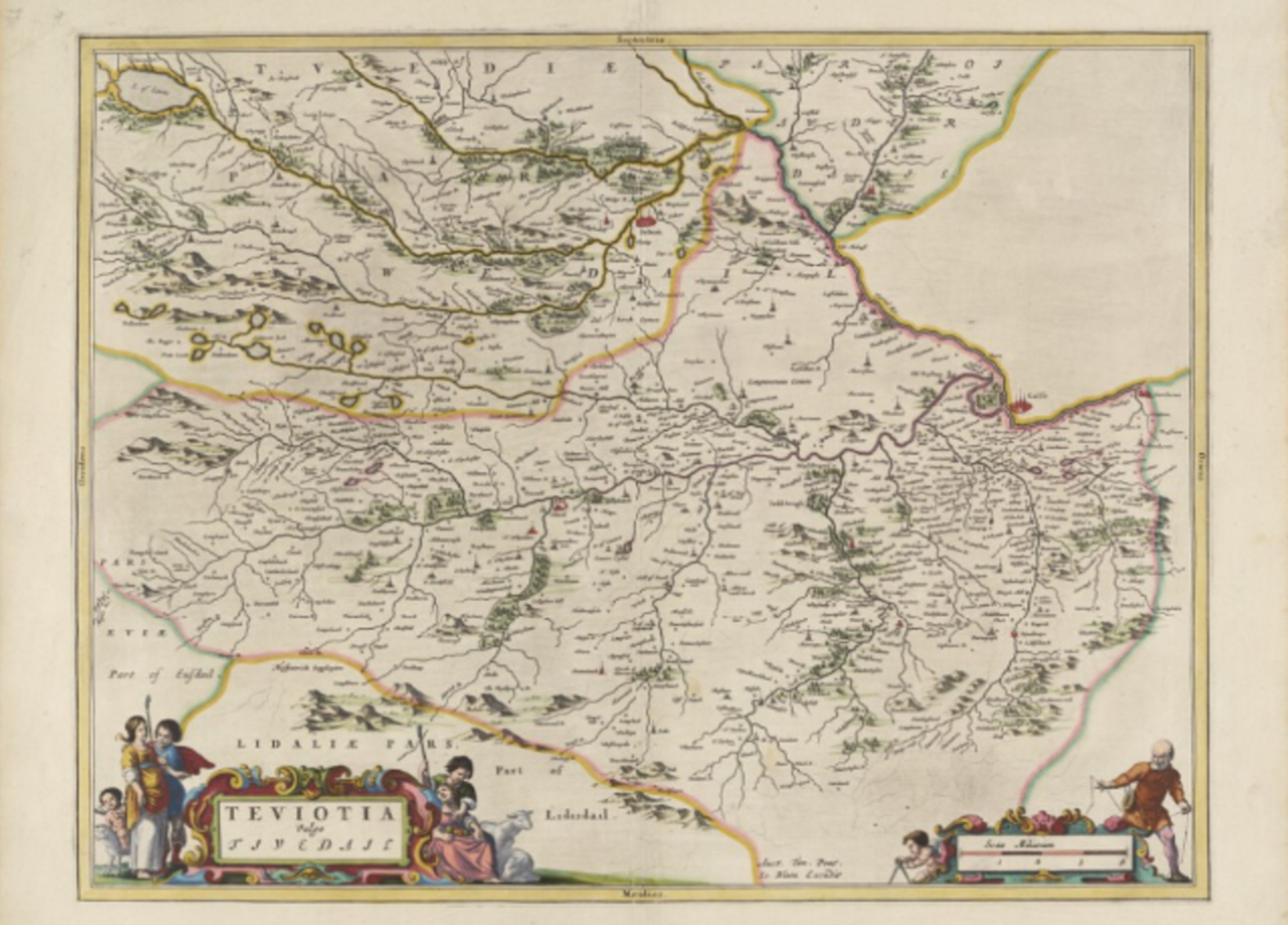
Ancestral homesites of people with the surname Routledge in Roxburghshire, including Hawick (Haick), Trows (Trowes), Cavers (Cauers), and Branxholm

The surname was first recorded in the 15th century in Scotland along the Anglo-Scottish border, in Liddesdale and the towns of Roxburgh, Hawick and Cavers on the River Teviot. Early Routledges were border reivers. In the 16th century, after their land was destroyed in the Rough Wooing, the family fled across the border and settled in Kilham, Northumberland and Bewcastle and Lanercost, Cumberland. In the 17th century, some Routledges were sent to Ulster. From Ireland, some immigrated to North America and France in the 17th century, and later Australia in the late 18th century.

== Geographical distribution ==
There are approximately 7,100 Routledges worldwide, with the majority residing in England (4,500). In England, the highest concentration of Routledges is in the north, in Cumbria, Northumberland, Tyne and Wear and County Durham. Other Routledges are in Canada (890), the United States (580), Australia (540) and Scotland (220) (with most living near the border, in Scottish Borders and Dumfries and Galloway).

The Rutledge variant is most common in the diaspora and overall, with 41,000 people bearing the name worldwide, primarily in the United States (35,000), but also Canada (2,900), Australia (1,000), England (620), New Zealand (350), Ireland (220) and Northern Ireland (200).

1,200 people are named Ratledge, 990 of whom are in the United States. England is home to another 180 Ratledges.

430 people are named Ruttledge, which is most frequent in Ireland (140), and also found in England (130) and the United States (110).

== People with the surname Routledge ==
=== Entertainers ===
- Alison Routledge (born 1960), New Zealand actress
- Anna Mae Routledge (born 1982), Canadian actress
- Ian Routledge, fictional character on the Australian soap opera Home and Away
- Jordan Routledge, British actor
- Patricia Routledge (1929–2025), English actress, comedian and singer

=== Politics ===
- Edmund Routledge (1843–1899), British publisher and politician
- George Albert Routledge (1855–1924), Canadian politician from Ontario
- Janet Routledge, Canadian politician from British Columbia
- Nozizwe Madlala-Routledge (born 1952), South African politician

=== Scientists ===
- Donald Routledge Hill (1922–1994), engineer and historian
- Joshua Routledge, (1773–1829), English engineer and inventor of the Engineer's Slide Rule
- Katherine Routledge (1866–1935), English archaeologist, surveyor of Easter Island
- Norman Routledge (1928–2013), English mathematician and schoolteacher
- William Scoresby Routledge (1859–1939), anthropologist, husband of Katherine Routledge

=== Sports ===
- Ben Fisk-Routledge (born 1993), Canadian soccer player
- Bill Routledge (1907–1972), English footballer
- Jon Routledge (born 1989), English footballer
- Raymond Routledge (1931–2008), American bodybuilder, 1961 Mr. America
- Thomas Routledge (1867–1927), English born South African test cricketer
- Wayne Routledge (born 1985), English footballer

=== Other ===
- George Routledge (1812–1888), English publisher, founder of the Routledge imprint
- Miles Routledge (born 1999), English author and war tourist
- William Routledge (priest) (1770–1843), Scottish Episcopalian priest

== See also ==
- Routledge, a British book imprint
- Ratledge
- Rutledge (disambiguation)
- Ruttledge
