= Lost Creek (Cedar Creek tributary) =

River in Missouri

Lost Creek is a stream in Washington County in the U.S. state of Missouri. It is a tributary of Cedar Creek.

The stream headwaters are in the southeastern corner of Washington County at 37°44′44″N 90°39′35″W and it flows west and then north passing under Missouri Route 32 to its confluence with Cedar Creek at 37°47′04″N 90°44′06″W approximately two miles northeast of Caledonia.

Lost Creek was named for the fact it is a losing stream or subterranean stream along parts of its course.

== See also ==
- List of rivers of Missouri
