= 2026 Arkansas lieutenant gubernatorial election =

- November 3, 2026
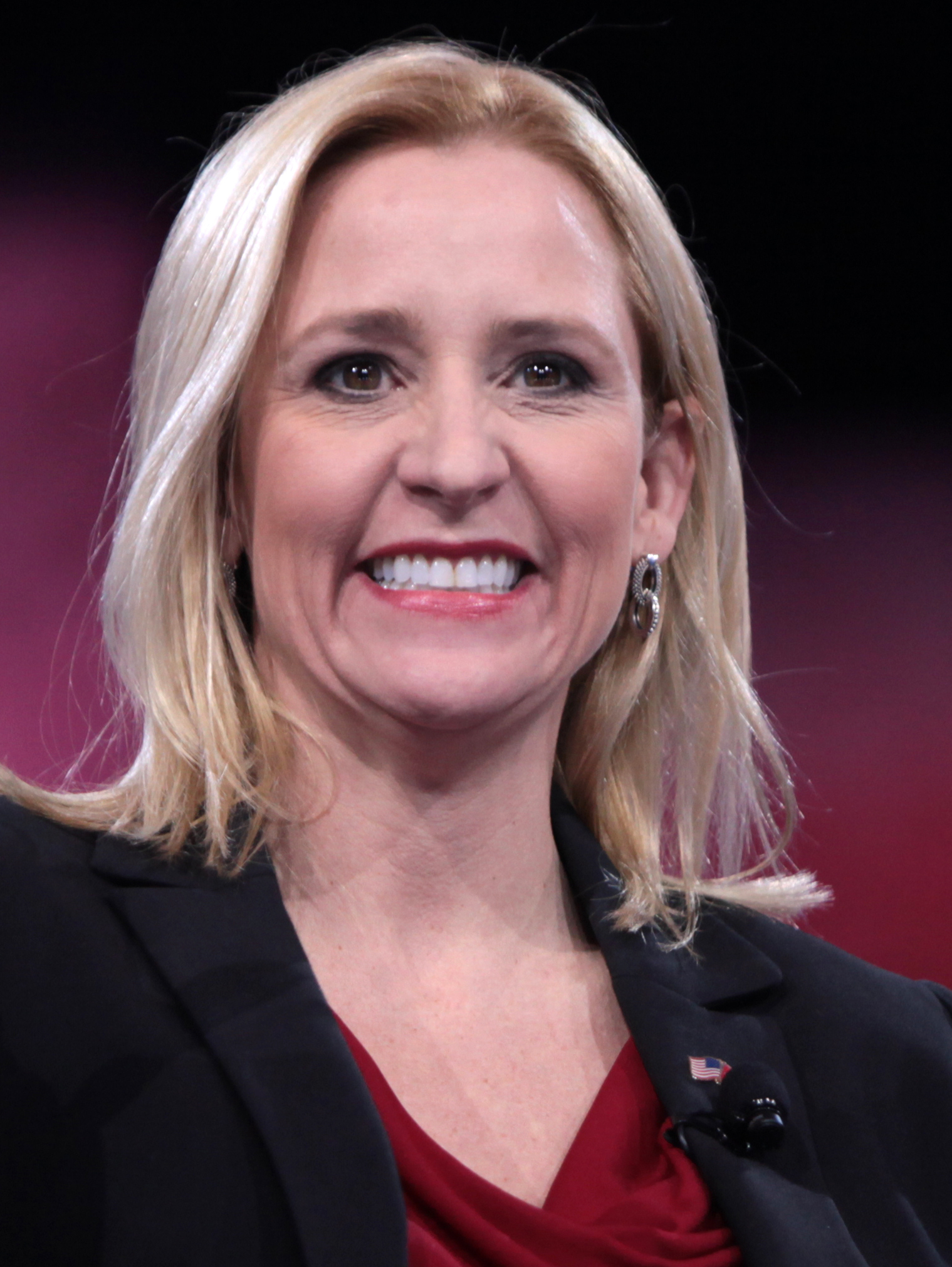

Candidate	Leslie Rutledge	Michael Kalagias
Party	Republican	Libertarian
Popular vote	537,118	304,115
Percentage	63.85%	36.15%
- Rutledge: 50–60% 60–70% 70–80% 80–90% Kalagias: 50–60%
Lieutenant Governor before election
Leslie Rutledge
Republican
Elected Lieutenant Governor
Leslie Rutledge
Republican

The 2026 Arkansas lieutenant gubernatorial election was held on November 3, 2026, to elect the lieutenant governor of Arkansas. Incumbent Republican Leslie Rutledge won re-election. Rutledge won the Republican nomination unopposed. She defeated Libertarian nominee Michael Kalagias in the general election. The Democratic Party did not contest this election.

== Republican primary ==
=== Candidates ===
==== Nominee ====
- Leslie Rutledge, incumbent lieutenant governor (2023–present)

== Third-party candidates ==
=== Libertarian Party ===
==== Nominee ====
- Michael Kalagias, perennial candidate

== General election ==
=== Results ===
2026 Arkansas lieutenant gubernatorial election
Party	Candidate	Votes	%	±%
Republican	Leslie Rutledge (incumbent)	537,118	63.85	–0.36
Libertarian	Michael Kalagias	304,115	36.15	+32.46
Total votes		841,233	100.00	
Republican hold				
