= Goose Creek (Cedar Creek tributary) =

Stream in Washington, Missouri

Coordinates: 37.7828270°N 90.7392946°W

Goose Creek is a stream in Washington County in the U.S. state of Missouri. It is a tributary of Cedar Creek.

Goose Creek was so named on account of geese in the area.

== See also ==
- List of rivers of Missouri
