= Saline Creek (Cedar Creek tributary) =

Stream in the American state of Missouri

Coordinates: 37.74366°N 90.75846°W

Saline Creek is a stream in Iron and Washington Counties in the U.S. state of Missouri. it is a tributary of Cedar Creek.

Saline Creek most likely was named for mineral licks along its course.

== See also ==
- List of rivers of Missouri
