= Ruttledge =

Ruttledge is a surname. Notable people with the surname include:

- Hugh Ruttledge (1884–1961), English civil servant and mountaineer
- P. J. Ruttledge (1892–1952), Irish politician
- Robert Francis Ruttledge (1899–2002), Irish ornithologist
- Tara Ruttledge (born 1991), Irish camogie player

== See also ==
- Routledge (surname)
