= Governor Rutledge =

Governor Rutledge may refer to:

- Edward Rutledge (1749–1800), 39th Governor of South Carolina
- John Rutledge (1739–1800), 31st Governor of South Carolina
