= Rutledge Run =

Stream in the American state of Missouri

Coordinates: 37°44′22″N 90°46′36″W

Rutledge Run is a stream in Iron and Washington Counties in the U.S. state of Missouri. It is a tributary of Cedar Creek.

Rutledge Run has the name of the local Rutledge family.

== See also ==
- List of rivers of Missouri
