= Nate Steel =

American politician

Member of the Arkansas House of Representatives from the 19th district
- In office November 1, 2010 – 2015
- Succeeded by: Justin Gonzales

Personal details
- Party: Democratic
- Education: University of Arkansas (BA, JD)

Nate Steel is an American attorney and politician who served as a member of the Arkansas House of Representatives from 2011 to 2015. During the 89th General Assembly session from 2013 to 2015, Steel served on the Judiciary committee.

== Education ==
Steel graduated from Nashville High School in Nashville, Arkansas. He earned his undergraduate degree from the University of Arkansas at Fayetteville and his Juris Doctor from the University of Arkansas School of Law.

== Career ==
Steel ran unsuccessfully for Attorney General of Arkansas in 2014. Steel's introductory campaign commercial, posted on YouTube, identifies prison overcrowding in Arkansas as a problem because the state has the second-worst meth rate in America. Steel lost to the Republican nominee, Leslie Rutledge. He left office in 2015 and was succeeded in the Arkansas House by Justin Gonzales.

Steel is an attorney and deputy prosecuting attorney. He is a member of the Howard Memorial Hospital Foundation board of directors, the Cossatot Community College U of A Foundation board of directors, and CASA for Children board of advisors.

== Personal life ==
Steel is a Methodist.

Party political offices
Preceded by Dustin McDaniel	Democratic nominee for Arkansas Attorney General; 2014	Succeeded by Tim Griffin
