= Dustin McDaniel =

American lawyer and politician

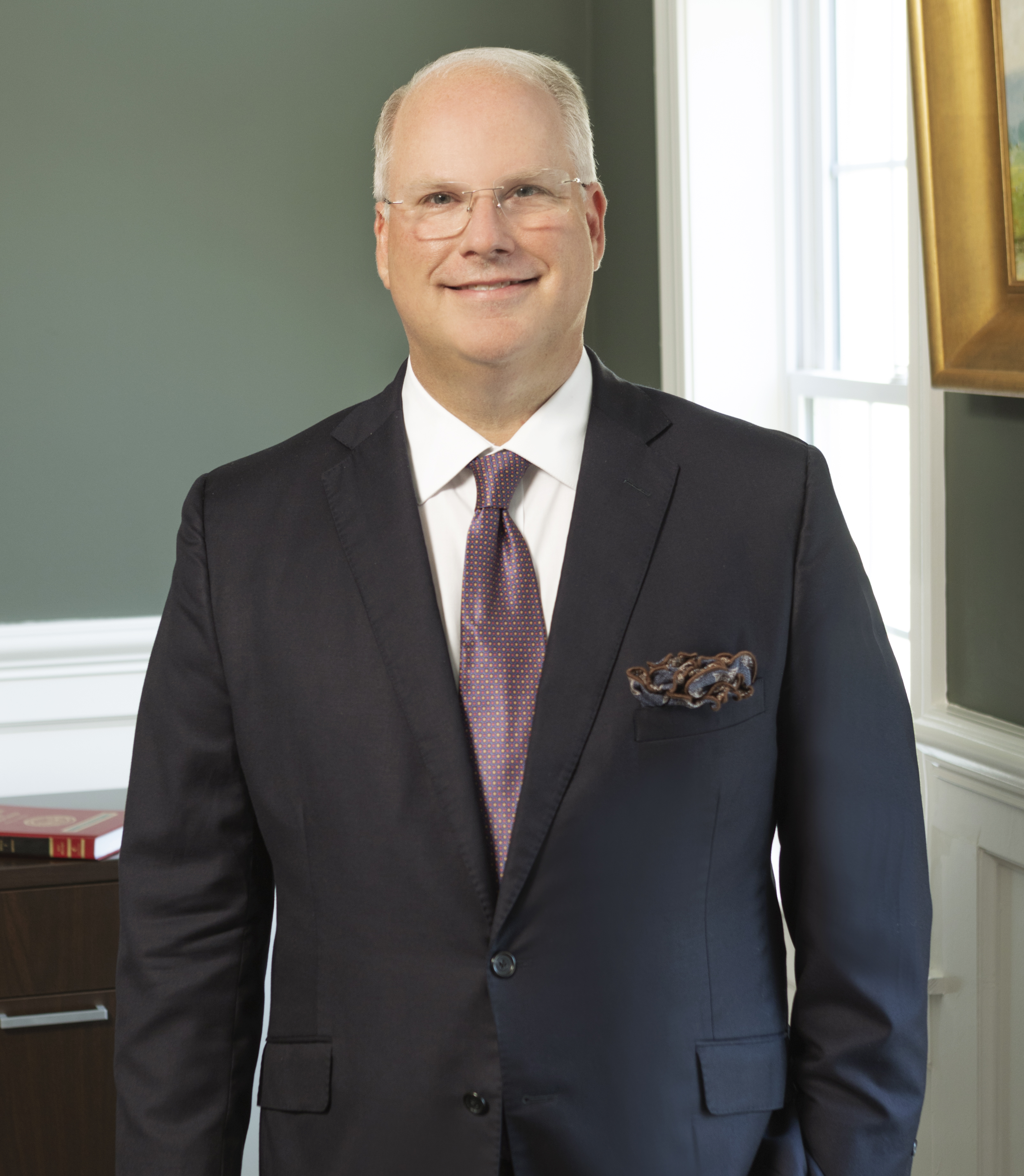

55th Attorney General of Arkansas
- In office January 9, 2007 – January 13, 2015
- Governor: Mike Beebe
- Preceded by: Mike Beebe
- Succeeded by: Leslie Rutledge

Member of the Arkansas House of Representatives from the 75th district
- In office January 10, 2005 – January 8, 2007
- Preceded by: Paul Bookout
- Succeeded by: Joan Cash

Personal details
- Born: Dustin Blake McDaniel; April 29, 1972 (age 54) Fayetteville, Arkansas, U.S.
- Party: Democratic
- Spouse: Bobbi McDaniel
- Children: 3
- Education: University of Arkansas; University of Arkansas at Little Rock
- Website: Official Website

Dustin Blake McDaniel (born April 29, 1972) is an American lawyer and politician who served as the 55th Attorney General of Arkansas from 2007 to 2015. McDaniel is the co-chair of Cozen O’Connor’s State Attorneys General Group. He is also the Office Managing Partner of Cozen O’Connor’s Little Rock, Arkansas office. To date, McDaniel is the last Democrat to have held the office of Arkansas Attorney General.

McDaniel's practice focuses on attorney general investigations, consumer protection and administrative law issues, multi-state litigation, antitrust laws, tobacco laws, gaming laws, Medicaid fraud and digital privacy laws. He is licensed in Arkansas, South Dakota, and the District of Columbia and enjoys a national law practice representing individuals and some of America's largest law firms and corporations. He advises clients across a wide range of industries from healthcare to technology, with a focus on highly regulated industries. McDaniel assists his clients with their interactions with state attorneys general from both parties across the country. He has successfully argued before the U.S. Supreme Court. He is recognized by Arkansas Business as one of the Arkansas 250, the state's most influential leaders. He has also been listed in the Best Lawyers in America for his government relations practice. He has served as an adjunct professor of law at the UALR William H. Bowen School of Law.

== Early life and education ==
Dustin McDaniel was born in Fayetteville, Arkansas. He is the oldest son of Bobby McDaniel and Melody Gammon Konnerth. McDaniel has one sibling, Brett Anthony McDaniel, an attorney in Jonesboro, Arkansas. After Dustin was born, his father, Bobby, graduated from the University of Arkansas School of Law. Mike Beebe, the 45th Governor of Arkansas, was a fellow law student and friend of the family.

McDaniel attended Jonesboro, Arkansas Public Schools, graduating from Jonesboro High School in 1990. He attended the University of Arkansas at Fayetteville, where he was a student at the Sam M. Walton College of Business. He is a member of the Xi Chapter Kappa Sigma fraternity and the President of the Interfraternity Council. He graduated with a Bachelor of Science in Public Administration in 1994.

In 1996, McDaniel enrolled at the University of Arkansas at Little Rock's William H. Bowen School of Law. He was elected Honor Council Prosecutor at Bowen and served as Assistant Articles Editor for the UALR Law Review. After two and a half years, he graduated cum laude with his Juris Doctor in January 1999. McDaniel continues to serve on the law school's Dean's Advisory Council.

== Career ==
=== Jonesboro Police Department ===
After college, McDaniel joined the Jonesboro Police Department (JPD) in Jonesboro, Arkansas. He attended the Arkansas Law Enforcement Training Academy (ALETA) in Camden, Arkansas. He is a graduate of ALETA Class 94-D. He served as a full-time patrolman with JPD from 1994 to 1996. From 1996 to 2000, he served as a part-time uniformed officer while attending law school. From 2000 to 2017, McDaniel was assigned to the Department's Training Division as a Part-Time Category II member of the force. He has served as a part-time volunteer deputy to the Poinsett County Sheriff’s Department from 2017 to the present.

In 1998, a mass shooting occurred at Westside Middle School, killing four students and one teacher and wounding ten other students. McDaniel saw the news breaking on CNN and drove to Jonesboro to report for duty and go to the scene. He spoke of it often in his public life. McDaniel's father, Bobby McDaniel, filed suit on behalf of the families of the dead against the shooters and the manufacturers of the firearms used. The suit was filed before Dustin McDaniel had a law license. Still, it was used by former Senator Gunner DeLay in 2006 as evidence of McDaniel's lack of trustworthiness on Second Amendment Issues. McDaniel fought back by touting his law enforcement background and being an avid hunter. In 2017, the families were awarded an uncollectible judgment of $150 million against perpetrators Mitchell Johnson and Andrew Golden.

=== Private practice ===
After law school, McDaniel joined his father's law firm, McDaniel & Wells, P.A. (now McDaniel Law Firm) in Jonesboro, Arkansas. He remained at McDaniel & Wells, P.A. from 1999 to 2007.

McDaniel received several awards during his private practice career, including a Golden Gavel Award from the Arkansas Bar Association for serving as Chair of the Consumer Law Handbook Committee in 2000 and a Distinguished Service Award from the Arkansas Bar Association for overseeing the Consumer Law Handbook's translation into Spanish in 2001. He also received the UALR William H. Bowen School of Law Young Alumnus Award in 2002. The same year, he was appointed to the Arkansas Bar Association Law School Committee and admitted into the Million Dollar Advocates Forum. In 2003, McDaniel was the only attorney in Arkansas to serve on the Arkansas Bar Association's Legislation committees and the Arkansas Trial Lawyers Association.

McDaniel served as Legal Counsel for the Craighead County Democratic Central Committee and as a member of the Democratic Party of Arkansas State Committee from 2002 to 2005.

Under Arkansas law, the Attorney General is prohibited from engaging in the private practice of law. McDaniel left McDaniel & Wells, P.A. in January 2007 and formed McDaniel, Richardson & Calhoun, PLLC in 2015 after he was term-limited.

In 2019, the UALR William H. Bowen School of Law presented him with its Distinguished Alumnus Award.

== Arkansas House of Representatives ==
On July 1, 2003, McDaniel announced his candidacy for the 75th District Arkansas House of Representatives. The 75th District encompassed the metropolitan Jonesboro area. His primary opponent was veteran and school administrator Paul House. After securing the Democratic primary, McDaniel went on to face Billie Sue Hoggard (R) in the general election. McDaniel won, receiving 53% of votes. In that same election, President George W. Bush (R) defeated Sen. John Kerry (D) 53% to 46% in Arkansas House District 75 (Craighead County).

May 18, 2004 Democratic Primary Results

Candidate	Total Votes Received
Paul House	1,992 (42%)
Dustin McDaniel	2,745 (58%)

November 2, 2004 General Election Results

Candidate	Total Votes Received
Dustin McDaniel (D)	6,361 (53%)
Billie Sue Hoggard (R)	5,655 (47%)

McDaniel was sworn into the 85th Arkansas General Assembly in January 2005. From 2005 to 2007, he served on the House Public Health, Welfare, and Labor Committee. During his one term, he authored and passed complicated and controversial legislation, including bills regarding Tax Increment Financing (TIF) and establishing a prescription drug program for working, uninsured Arkansans called “Arkansas Rx,” which was never fully implemented.

During his term, McDaniel was the only freshman named to the Top Ten Legislators list by the Arkansas Democrat-Gazette. He was also appointed co-chair of the Joint Select Committee on Health Insurance and Prescription Drugs.

== 55th Attorney General of Arkansas ==
On June 29, 2005, McDaniel announced his candidacy for Attorney General. He faced two primary opponents, Paul Suskie and Robert Leo Herzfeld. During the campaign, 16 former Presidents of the Arkansas Bar Association endorsed McDaniel, as well as former State Treasurer and 2002 Democratic Candidate for Governor, Jimmie Lou Fisher, who served as McDaniel's campaign chair.

Democratic Primary, 2006

[null Candidate]	Total Votes Received
Dustin McDaniel	104,364 (38.4%)
Paul Suskie	86,970 (32.0%)
Robert Leo Herzfeld	80,448 (29.6%)

Democratic Primary Run-off, 2006

Candidate	Total Votes Received
Dustin McDaniel	87,038 (50.8%)
Paul Suskie	84,296 (49.2%)

In the general election, McDaniel faced two opponents: Republican candidate former State Senator Gunner DeLay and Green Party candidate attorney Rebekah Kennedy. McDaniel won his bid for Attorney General and became the youngest attorney general in the nation when he was sworn in at the age of 34.

November 7, 2006 General Election Results

Candidate	Total Votes Received
Dustin McDaniel	443,699 (58.5%)
Gunner DeLay	281,389 (37.1%)
Rebekah Kennedy	33,372 (4.4%)

=== First term ===
During his first term as Attorney General, McDaniel expanded consumer protection litigation and Medicaid fraud enforcement and established the Arkansas Attorney General's Office as a law enforcement agency. He also instigated the "Be Street Smart" Program to raise consumer awareness of scams and cybercrimes.

McDaniel reorganized the Criminal Department of the Attorney General's Office to better address an increase in the caseload of habeas corpus and 1983 civil rights cases brought by or on behalf of death row inmates.

In 2007, McDaniel helped resolve Lake View School District No. 25 v. Huckabee, a fifteen-year-old case filed by the Lake View School District that examined the structure for the funding of Arkansas schools. This case led to the subsequent overhaul of public school funding to be more fair and exact and to benefit all Arkansas students equally. McDaniel worked closely with legislators during his first two years as Attorney General. In April 2006, the Arkansas General Assembly passed legislation that gave the public schools additional funding. The special masters’ final report in 2007 was positive, leading the court to declare the funding program for education to be constitutional. The Lake View School District was consolidated with the Barton-Lexa School District through a final series of reforms.

McDaniel demanded that payday lenders in Arkansas shut down or face legal action, ordering nearly 156 outlets to shut down and stating, "In addition, I hereby demand you void any and all current and past-due obligations of your borrowers and refrain from any collection activities related to these payday loans." Through litigation on behalf of payday loan customers, more than $7 million was awarded.

In 2009, after a year of debate and discussion between agriculture advocates and animal welfare organizations, McDaniel brokered a successful bill to address animal cruelty. The bill, SB 77, called for a felony charge of aggravated animal cruelty for a first offense when committed against a dog, cat, or horse. The bill defined animal cruelty as mistreating an animal, killing or injuring an animal that is not your own, abandonment, starvation, failure to provide adequate shelter, or dragging an animal behind a vehicle. SB 77 included stiffer penalties when the abuse is committed in front of a child, increased penalties for subsequent misdemeanor charges (the fourth misdemeanor charge would result in a felony), and required psychological evaluations for offenders. The bill also outlawed all animal fighting as, at the time, only dog fighting was illegal. The bill became Act 33 of 2009.

McDaniel passed legislation empowering the Attorney General's Office as the statewide law enforcement agency, allowing for the creation for a cyber division that pursued online sex offenders.

=== Second term ===
McDaniel was unopposed in the 2010 Democratic Party Primary. During the general election, he again faced Green Party candidate Rebekah Kennedy. McDaniel easily defended his seat, capturing 72.8% of the vote to secure a second term.

Candidate	Total Votes Received
Dustin McDaniel (D)	526,209 (72.8%)
Rebekah Kennedy (G)	196,605 (26.8%)

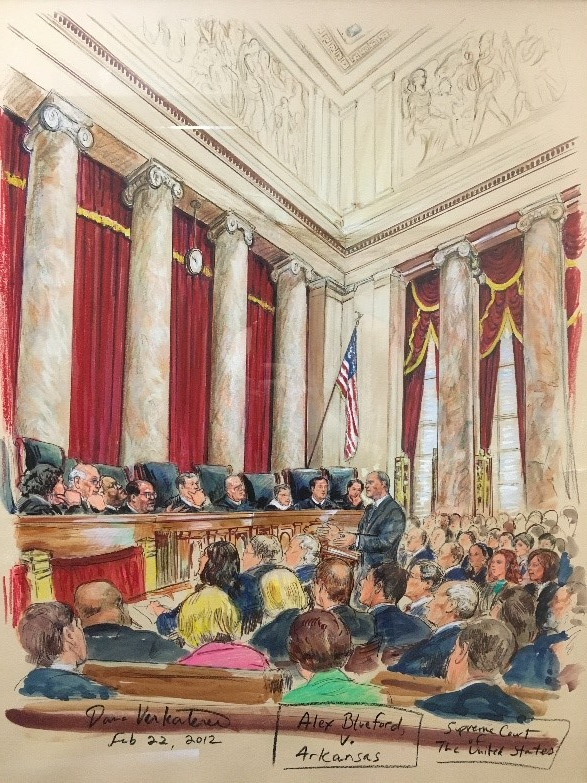
Dustin McDaniel presenting his arguments to the justices of the U.S. Supreme Court in Blueford v. Arkansas.

During his second term, McDaniel became the first Arkansas Attorney General to argue before the U.S. Supreme Court in nearly 16 years, successfully arguing the State's position in Blueford v. Arkansas (2012).

The term also included multiple settlements he procured for the State of Arkansas. In March 2013, McDaniel announced that an arbitration panel issued a ruling allowing a settlement between Arkansas and the tobacco companies that signed the 1998 Master Settlement Agreement. Arkansas received the entire settlement money in escrow, which amounted to $22.7 million. That November, McDaniel successfully negotiated a settlement agreement with North Little Rock School District, Pulaski County Special School District, and the Little Rock School District that phased out millions in ongoing, annual desegregation payments. The state would pay the districts $65.8 million for four years, with the final year's funds used only to construct academic facilities. In January 2014, U.S. District Judge D. Price Marshall accepted the agreement.

Positions held as Attorney General

- National Association of Attorneys General's Southern Region, Chairman (2009-2011)
- National Association of Attorneys General's Tobacco Committee, Co-chairman (2009-2013)
- National Association of Attorneys General's Energy and Environment Committee, Co-chairman (2013-2014)
- Democratic Attorneys General Association, Co-chairman (2009-2011)
- Democratic Attorneys General Association's DNC representative (2009-2013)
- State chair of Hillary Clinton's 2008 presidential campaign
- Rodel Fellow, The Aspen Institute (2007–Present)

In June 2012, McDaniel filed paperwork to start raising money for his 2014 campaign for Governor of Arkansas. In the first six months, McDaniel raised over $1.5 million. Early polling showed McDaniel as an overwhelming favorite for the Democratic nomination. However, in 2010 and 2012, Republicans took over Arkansas politics, and early polling showed McDaniel as a long shot against Republican opponent Asa Hutchinson. In 2013, McDaniel announced he would not run for governor, instead endorsing former Congressman Mike Ross for the Democratic nomination. In 2014, Asa Hutchinson defeated Mike Ross to become the 46th Governor of Arkansas.

== Return to private practice ==
After being term-limited in January 2015, McDaniel founded McDaniel, Richardson & Calhoun, PLLC, now McDaniel Wolff, PLLC, in Little Rock, Arkansas, with partners Scott Richardson and Bart Calhoun, former colleagues in the Arkansas AG Office.

In July 2024, McDaniel left McDaniel Wolff to co-chair the State Attorneys General Group at Cozen O’Connor with Jerry Kilgore, the former Attorney General of Virginia.

McDaniel is the national co-chair of the Society of Attorneys General Emeritus (SAGE) and serves on the board of trustees of the Central Arkansas Library System.

== Personal life ==
McDaniel married Amanda Gail Miller McDaniel in 1996. They have one daughter, Emma Grace McDaniel (b. 2001). Dustin and Amanda divorced in 2008.

On June 12, 2009, McDaniel married Bobbi Pualani Fowler. Bobbi had two children from a prior marriage, Chris Eugene “C.J.” Fowler Jr. (b. 1999) and Alexandra Rose Fowler (b. 2001).

McDaniel is an avid sportsman. He is passionate about Arkansas duck hunting and South Dakota pheasant hunting. He also has his pilot's license.

Party political offices
Preceded by Mike Beebe	Democratic nominee for Arkansas Attorney General; 2006, 2010	Succeeded by Nate Steel
Political offices
Preceded by Mike Beebe	Attorney General of Arkansas; 2007–2015	Succeeded by Leslie Rutledge
