= Cedar Creek (Big River tributary) =

Stream in the American state of Missouri

Location
- Country: United States
- State: Missouri
- Region: Washington and Iron counties

Physical characteristics
- Source
  - location: Iron County, Missouri
  - coordinates: 37°41′06″N 90°52′16″W
- Mouth
  - location: Washington County
  - coordinates: 37°48′42″N 90°43′15″W
  - elevation: 238 m (781 ft)

Basin features
- Tributaries
  - left: Rutledge Run, Goose Creek
  - right: McClurg Branch, Saline Creek, Lost Creek

Cedar Creek is a stream in Iron and Washington counties in the U.S. state of Missouri. It is a tributary to Big River.

The stream headwaters are in northern Iron County just southeast of the intersection of Missouri Route 32 and Missouri Route A and it flows northeast parallel to Route 32 past Banner. It crosses under Route 32 and enters Washington County to the east of Logan Mountain. It continues northeast passing under Missouri Route 21 and southeast of Caledonia and on to its confluence with the Big River southwest of Irondale in southern Washington County.

Cedar Creek was named for the cedar timber along its course.

== See also ==
- List of rivers of Missouri
