= Banner, Missouri =

- Unincorporated community
- Location within Missouri Location within the United States
- Coordinates: 37°41′49″N 90°50′04″W
- Country: United States
- State: Missouri
- County: Iron
- Elevation: 1,034 ft (315 m)
- Time zone: UTC-6 (Central (CST))
  - Summer (DST): UTC-5 (CDT)
- Area code: 573
- GNIS feature ID: 784661

Banner is an unincorporated community in northern Iron County, in the U.S. state of Missouri.

The community is located on the banks of Keesling Branch one half mile from that stream's confluence with Cedar Creek on Missouri Route 32 approximately 5 miles (8.0 km) west of Belleview.

== History ==
A post office called Banner was established in 1924 in Kaolin Township and remained in operation until 1956. It is unknown why the name "Banner" was applied to this community. A variant name was "Brule".
