= Leslie Rutledge =

American politician (born 1976)

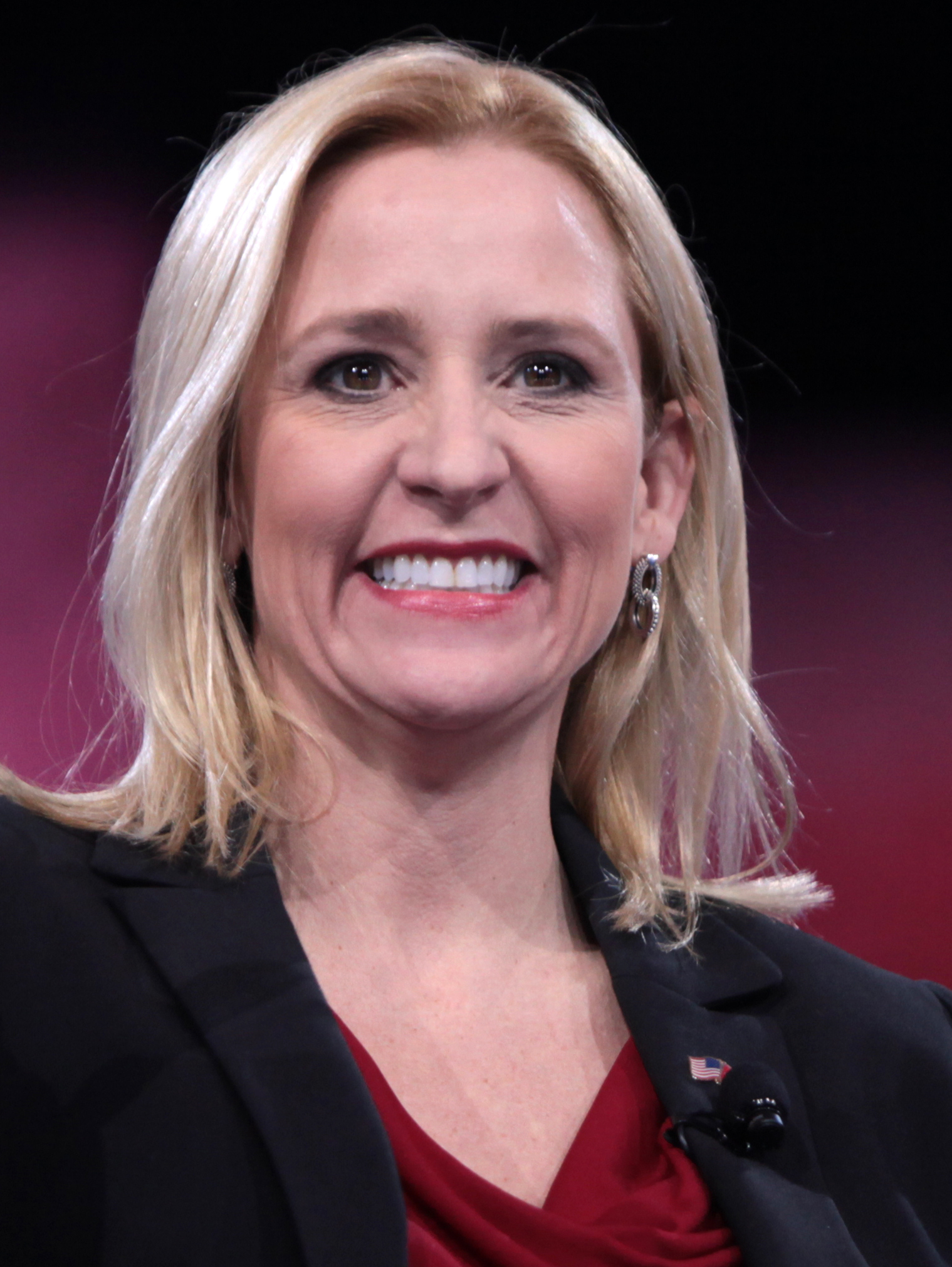
- Rutledge in 2016

21st Lieutenant Governor of Arkansas
- Incumbent
- Assumed office January 10, 2023
- Governor: Sarah Huckabee Sanders
- Preceded by: Tim Griffin

56th Attorney General of Arkansas
- In office January 13, 2015 – January 10, 2023
- Governor: Asa Hutchinson
- Preceded by: Dustin McDaniel
- Succeeded by: Tim Griffin

Personal details
- Born: Leslie Carol Rutledge; June 9, 1976 (age 50) Batesville, Arkansas, U.S.
- Party: Republican
- Spouse: Boyce Johnson (m. 2015)
- Children: 1
- Education: University of Arkansas (BA, JD)

Leslie Carol Rutledge (born June 9, 1976) is an American attorney and politician who has served as the 21st lieutenant governor of Arkansas since 2023. A member of the Republican Party, she was previously the 56th attorney general of Arkansas from 2015 to 2023.

Rutledge served as counsel for Governor Mike Huckabee before she was elected to be Arkansas attorney general in 2014. She was reelected as attorney general in 2018, and elected lieutenant governor in the 2022 after withdrawing from gubernatorial election and endorsing Sarah Huckabee Sanders. Rutledge was the first Republican since Thomas D. W. Yonley and first woman elected attorney general for Arkansas, and is the first female lieutenant governor of Arkansas.

== Early life and education ==
Rutledge was born in Batesville, Arkansas, on June 9, 1976. She graduated from Southside High School, the University of Arkansas, and the William H. Bowen School of Law at the University of Arkansas at Little Rock.

== Early career ==
Rutledge began her legal career as law clerk to the Arkansas Court of Appeals Judge Josephine Hart, a family friend. Rutledge worked on Hart's successful campaigns for election as associate justice of the Arkansas Supreme Court. Before seeking office herself, Rutledge also worked for the national Republican Party, as a lawyer for the National Republican Congressional Committee and Republican National Committee. For a time, she was also a deputy prosecuting attorney in Lonoke County.

Rutledge was hired as an attorney for the Division of Children and Family Services within the Arkansas Department of Human Services (DHS) in October 2006, and resigned with immediate effect on December 3, 2007. A partial set of personnel records obtained by the press in 2014 under Arkansas' freedom of information law showed that Rutledge was flagged by DHS with "do not rehire" status. Rutledge said that she resigned to work for Arkansas Governor Mike Huckabee's presidential campaign, suggested the "do not hire" status was not related to any incident at work, and suggested that the notation, "My guess is that it was because I did not give a two weeks notice." In 2018, an employee of the Democratic Party of Arkansas filed a FOIA lawsuit to compel the release of Rutledge's DHS personnel file; Rutledge said the lawsuit was "dragging up decade-old fake news." The agency had initially withheld the records, but a state judge ruled that Rutledge's file must be released under the Arkansas' freedom of information law. The remaining eight pages of Rutledge's personnel file were then released, reflecting that her DHS employment was terminated for "gross misconduct"; Rutledge said the notation was incorrect. Other records released in 2018 included one document evaluating Rutledge's performance as "satisfactory"; one non-disciplinary "counseling statement" critiquing her handling of a case; and a "notice of disciplinary action."

Rutledge was a lawyer for Huckabee's unsuccessful 2008 campaign for the Republican presidential nomination, and campaigned for him in Iowa ahead of the caucus there.

== Political career ==
=== Attorney General of Arkansas ===
==== 2014 election and 2018 re-election ====
Rutledge sought the Republican nomination for Attorney General of Arkansas in the 2014 election. She faced fellow attorneys Patricia Nation and David Sterling. Rutledge finished with a plurality in the May 2014 primary but finished with less than 50 percent of the vote. She hence faced second-place finisher Sterling (the former city manager of Hope) in a runoff election. Nation endorsed Rutledge, and she defeated Sterling.

In September 2014, Pulaski County Clerk Larry Crane canceled Rutledge's voter registration when he discovered that Rutledge had registered to vote in Washington, D.C., and Virginia. Rutledge protested (saying that the cancellation of her registration "was improper, invalid and illegal") but nevertheless re-registered to vote in Pulaski County.

In the November 2014 general election, Rutledge defeated Democratic Party nominee Nate Steel, a member of the Arkansas House of Representatives, and Libertarian Party nominee Aaron Cash, in the general election. Rutledge won 51.61% of the vote, Steel 43.21%, and Cash 5.18%.

In 2018, Rutledge won re-election. She received 61.8% of the vote, defeating Democratic nominee Mike Lee (who received 35.43%) and Libertarian nominee Kerry Hicks (who received 2.77%).

==== LGBT laws ====
In 2015, the state legislature passed the Intrastate Commerce Improvement Act, a law blocking local governments from passing anti-discrimination laws protecting from discrimination based on sexual orientation or gender identity. Several Arkansas local governments, including Fayetteville, Eureka Springs, Hot Springs, and Texarkana, passed anti-discrimination ordinances. Rutledge defended the state's law, opposed the local governments' ordinances, and appealed a ruling by a circuit judge that the Fayetteville ordinance did not violate state law. The Arkansas Supreme Court, in decisions in 2017 and 2018, sided with Rutledge, ruling that the local anti-discrimination ordinance was void.

In February 2021, Rutledge proposed a bill that would prohibit transgender athletes from playing on girls' sports teams in K–12 schools.

Rutledge defended Arkansas House Bill 1570, a law enacted by the Arkansas Legislature in 2021 that banned gender-affirming care for minors. The law was enacted in 2021 amid an anti-transgender movement; in the subsequent court challenge, Rutledge defended the law. She was interviewed on The Problem with Jon Stewart about the law, which the federal courts blocked.

==== Immigration ====
In July 2017, Rutledge joined Texas Attorney General Ken Paxton, as well as nine other Republican state attorneys general and Republican Idaho Governor Butch Otter, in threatening the Donald Trump administration that they would litigate if the president did not terminate the Deferred Action for Childhood Arrivals policy that had been put into place by President Barack Obama.

Rutledge was a speaker at the 2018 CPAC in Maryland; in her speech, Rutledge introduced herself as a "Christian, pro-life, gun-carrying conservative woman" and cited the Bible as a reason to limit immigration, mentioning the construction of city walls by Nehemiah referenced in the Book of Nehemiah.

==== Gambling ====
In June 2017, Rutledge again rejected a proposed state constitutional amendment to legalize casino gambling. She rejected the proposal by Barry Emigh of Hot Springs, writing that the proposed popular name and ballot title are "misleading and wholly deficient."

==== Healthcare ====
As AG, Rutledge frequently targeted the Affordable Care Act (ACA), seeking to dismantle it through court challenges. In 2018, she joined 19 other Republican-led states in a challenge to the ACA, saying, "It's time that we remove the Affordable Care Act from the backs of the American people." Rutledge, along with then-President Donald Trump, asked the U.S. Supreme Court to strike down the entire ACA, which provides health insurance coverage to about 300,000 Arkansans. The Supreme Court rejected the states' claims in a 7–2 decision in 2021.

Rutledge defended an Arkansas law that regulated pharmacy benefit managers. In 2020, the U.S. Supreme Court upheld the Arkansas law, ruling unanimously in Rutledge v. Pharmaceutical Care Management Association that the Employee Retirement Income Security Act (ERISA) did not preempt state laws regulating PBMs.

==== Abortion ====
In June 2022, the U.S. Supreme Court decided Dobbs v. Jackson Women's Health Organization, which overturned Roe v. Wade (1973) and ruled that there is no federal constitutional right to abortion. Under an Arkansas "trigger law" enacted in 2019 (Arkansas Act 180 of 2019), abortion was effectively banned in the state, except to save the life of the mother, immediately after the ruling. Rutledge celebrated the ruling and, under the 2019 law, she signed the formal certification that Roe had been overturned, implementing the abortion ban. Rutledge said that "it is my greatest honor to officially end abortion in Arkansas."

==== Student debt ====
In 2022, after President Joe Biden took executive action to forgiving a portion of student loan debt, Rutledge joined a lawsuit (Biden v. Nebraska) brought by five other Republican state attorneys general. The debt-relief program was ultimately blocked by a divided Supreme Court in 2023; Rutledge celebrated the ruling on Facebook, describing the program as "a way to erase the debt of privileged college grads."

==== Role as Trump surrogate ====
Rutledge was a campaign surrogate for Donald Trump during the 2016 presidential campaign. In a speech at the Republican National Convention in July 2016, she declared "I proudly stand with Donald Trump" and blasted his opponent, Hillary Rodham Clinton, saying: "How can you support someone who has had an FBI investigation?" At the first presidential debate between Trump and Clinton, in September 2016, Rutledge sat on a CBS News panel and stated people did not care about Trump's tax returns, leading to an extended exchange with journalist Bob Schieffer. Asked about the discussion in an Arkansas Money and Politics interview, Rutledge stated it was to be expected because the other panelists were part of the "liberal elite media." In October 2016, after the Access Hollywood tape came to light (in which Trump made lewd comments about women); Rutledge said that Trump's remarks were "offensive" but reiterated her support for his candidacy.

As AG, Rutledge aligned herself with Trump, including on the lawsuit seeking repeal of the Affordable Care Act.

In November 2016, Rutledge was appointed to the executive committee of the Republican Attorneys General Association; she became the group's vice chairwoman the following year.

==== Attempt to overturn 2020 presidential election result ====
In the November 2020 United States presidential election, Joe Biden defeated Donald Trump. After his election loss, Trump and his allies attempted to subvert the election result. In December 2020, after the electoral college had already voted, Rutledge was one of 18 Republican state attorneys general who filed a failed lawsuit, Texas v. Pennsylvania, that sought to nullify the election outcome in four key states won by Biden (Georgia, Michigan, Pennsylvania, and Wisconsin) and thus keep Trump in power. The U.S. Supreme Court rejected the lawsuit, which was predicated on baseless claims. Rutledge did not publicly acknowledge the legitimacy of Biden's election victory until February 2021, after he had already taken office.

In September 2022, The 65 Project, a legal activism group, submitted an ethics complaint against Rutledge to the Arkansas Office of the Committee on Professional Conduct. The complaint said that, by advancing false and frivolous claims to undermine the election result, Rutledge violated the rules of professional conduct governing lawyers. Rutledge denied wrongdoing, framing the ethics complaint as a "political attack" against her.

==== State-sponsored television ads ====
As attorney general, Rutledge ramped up her office's spending on taxpayer-funded ads. The public relations ads, in which Rutledge appeared on camera discussing vaping and other issues, were seen as a precursor to a likely bid for governor. The ads (which in 2020 were branded "Rutledge Report") prompted criticism, including from some state legislators, such as Republican state senator Jim Hickey, who termed the ads a form of self-promotion. Rutledge's office spent $2.2 million on radio and television ads in fiscal year 2020, nearly $1 million in fiscal year 2021, and $3.28 million in fiscal year 2022.

In July 2020, Rutledge removed her name, image and voice from the AG Office television ads. By September 2021, however, she resumed using her voice and image on the ads. In January 2021, eight Arkansans filed a taxpayers' suit, alleging that Rutledge illegally spent public money to benefit Trump and herself politically through ad funding and through her involvement in out-of-state lawsuits, such as seeking to intervene in suits involving the National Rifle Association of America in Texas and New York. Rutledge denied the allegations; a state judge denied her motion to dismiss the suit in September 2021. In April 2022, the Arkansas Supreme Court dismissed most claims in the suit against Rutledge, ruling that she enjoyed sovereign immunity. However, the court allowed the plaintiffs' claim against Rutledge in her official capacity for "illegal exaction" (i.e., unauthorized spending of taxpayer funds) to proceed.

==== Restrictive voting laws ====
In 2021, following Trump's false claims of fraud in the 2020 presidential election, Arkansas's Republican-led Legislature enacted four laws that made it more difficult for voters to cast ballots. The League of Women Voters of Arkansas, Arkansas United, and five individual voters challenged the legislation. In 2022, a state judge ruled that the laws unconstitutionally infringed the right to vote and issued a permanent injunction barring enforcement of the laws. Rutledge defended the state's laws, called the trial court's decision "erroneous," and appealed the ruling. The Arkansas Supreme Court granted Rutledge's emergency motion for a stay, allowing the challenged laws to go into effect pending the appeal.

=== Lieutenant governor ===
==== 2022 election ====
In July 2020, Rutledge announced her candidacy for the Republican nomination for Arkansas governor in 2022. The incumbent, Republican Governor Asa Hutchinson, was barred by term limits from seeking another term in office. While campaigning for the nomination, Rutledge called for an amendment to the Arkansas Constitution to abolish Arkansas's individual state income tax.

Rutledge initially dismissed the likelihood that she would join the race for lieutenant governor, saying in a February 2021 interview that "after working a full-time job with a staff of 180 people, I'd be bored with a part-time job and a staff of two." However, after badly trailing Sarah Huckabee Sanders in fundraising, Rutledge switched in November 2021 to the lieutenant governor race, where she faced a crowded field of rivals in the Republican primary, including state Senator Jason Rapert, state Surgeon General Greg Bledsoe, Washington County Judge Joseph Wood, Little Rock businessman Chris Bequette, and former Arkansas Republican Party chairman Doyle Webb.

She won the nomination in the May 2022 Republican primary, winning 54% of the vote; Rapert came in second place with 14.70%, with other candidates trailing in the single digits. Rutledge defeated Democrat Kelly Krout in the November 8, 2022, general election; in the same election, Sanders, a fellow Republican, was elected governor. In the election, Rutledge swapped places with Lieutenant Governor Tim Griffin, a former congressman who was elected to replace her as AG.

==== 2026 election ====
Rutledge is running for reelection in 2026. She was unopposed in the Republican primary and will face Libertarian nominee Michael Kalagias in the general election.

==== Tenure ====
Rutledge took office as lieutenant governor on January 10, 2023. In her position, Rutledge presides over the state Senate.

Upon taking office, Rutledge requested a security detail; under a 1973 state law, the lieutenant governor is entitled to state-funded security provided by the Arkansas State Police, but previous lieutenant governors did not have it. In March 2023, the president pro tempore of the state Senate, Bart Hester, proposed legislation to eliminate the provision entitling the lieutenant governor to State Police security, and instead shifting funding for the lieutenant governor's security to the appropriation for her office, adding two security officers for the next fiscal year. Rutledge opposed the bill.

In March 2023, Arkansas Attorney General Tim Griffin accused Rutledge of misspending state funds during her time as AG. In testimony before the state legislature's Joint Budget Committee personnel subcommittee, Griffin reported that his office determined that Rutledge had exceeded the $25 million-per-fiscal year limit on spending from the proceeds of lawsuit settlement fees, exceeding the limit by some $11.1 million in fiscal year 2023, before Griffin became AG. Griffin said the spending over the limit was a clear violation of state law, while Rutledge maintained that the transfers were "in accordance with the law." Griffin said he had hired a certified public accountant/attorney to oversee his office's audit and would attempt to recoup some funds that had been disbursed or transferred to other state agencies.

== Personal life ==
Rutledge lives in Maumelle. In December 2015, Rutledge married Boyce Johnson, a farmer. In July 2018, Rutledge gave birth to a daughter, becoming the first statewide Arkansas elected official to give birth while holding office.

== Electoral history ==
Arkansas Attorney General Republican primary election, 2014
Party	Candidate	Votes	%
Republican	Leslie Rutledge	79,347	47.21
Republican	David Sterling	65,733	39.11
Republican	Patricia Nation	22,986	13.68

Arkansas Attorney General Republican primary runoff election, 2014
Party	Candidate	Votes	%
Republican	Leslie Rutledge	43,898	58.89
Republican	David Sterling	30,643	41.11

Arkansas Attorney General Election, 2014
Party	Candidate	Votes	%
Republican	Leslie Rutledge	430,799	51.61
Democratic	Nate Steel	360,680	43.21
Libertarian	Aaron Cash	43,245	5.18

Arkansas Attorney General election, 2018
Party	Candidate	Votes	%
Republican	Leslie Rutledge	549,668	61.97
Democratic	Mike Lee	315,099	35.25
Libertarian	Kerry Hicks	24,652	2.78

2022 Arkansas lieutenant gubernatorial Republican primary
Party	Candidate	Votes	%
Republican	Leslie Rutledge	183,888	54.00
Republican	Jason Rapert	50,063	14.70
Republican	Greg Bledsoe	33,722	9.90
Republican	Joesph Wood	29,277	8.60
Republican	Doyle Webb	23,188	6.81
Republican	Chris Bequette	20,411	5.99
Total votes		340,549	100.00

2022 Arkansas lieutenant gubernatorial election
Party	Candidate	Votes	%	±%
Republican	Leslie Rutledge	577,316	64.21%	+0.03
Democratic	Kelly Krout	288,631	32.10%	–0.93
Libertarian	Frank Gilbert	33,163	3.69%	+0.90
Total votes		899,110	100.00%	N/A
Republican hold				

== See also ==
- List of female state attorneys general in the United States

Party political offices
Preceded by Gunner DeLay	Republican nominee for Attorney General of Arkansas; 2014, 2018	Succeeded by Tim Griffin
Preceded by Tim Griffin	Republican nominee for Lieutenant Governor of Arkansas; 2022, 2026	Most recent
Legal offices
Preceded by Dustin McDaniel	Attorney General of Arkansas; 2015–2023	Succeeded by Tim Griffin
Political offices
Preceded by Tim Griffin	Lieutenant Governor of Arkansas; 2023–present	Incumbent
