= Converse, Texas =

City in Texas, US

- City
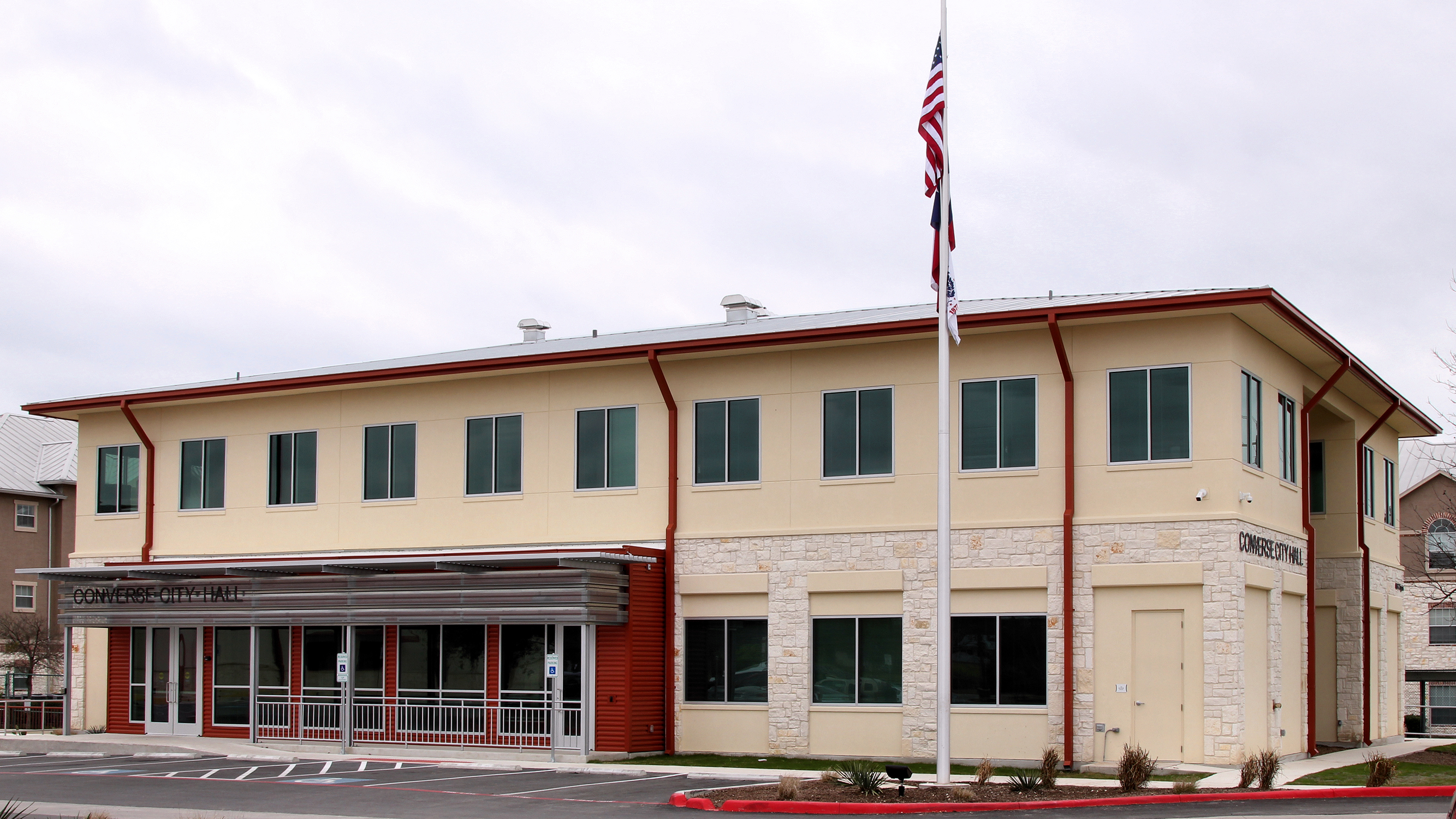
- City Hall

- Flag Seal Logo
- Motto: "Expanding Horizons"
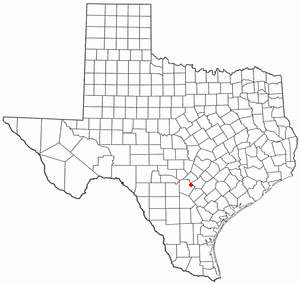
- Location of Converse, Texas

- Coordinates: 29°31′2″N 98°18′50″W
- Country: United States
- State: Texas
- County: Bexar

Government
  - Type: Council-Manager
  - City Council: Mayor Al Suarez; Mayor Pro Tem Kathy Richel; Chris L. Clark; Shawn Russell; Nancy Droneburg; Jeff Beehler; Marc Gilbert
  - City Manager: Wayne Reed

Area
  - Total: 8.55 sq mi (22.14 km^{2})
  - Land: 8.46 sq mi (21.91 km^{2})
  - Water: 0.093 sq mi (0.24 km^{2})
- Elevation: 719 ft (219 m)

Population (2020)
  - Total: 27,466
  - Estimate (2021): 29,960
  - Density: 3,330.8/sq mi (1,286.03/km^{2})
- Time zone: UTC-6 (Central (CST))
  - Summer (DST): UTC-5 (CDT)
- ZIP code: 78109
- Area codes: 210, 726
- FIPS code: 48-16468
- GNIS feature ID: 1333257
- ANSI Code: 2410219
- Website: www.conversetx.gov

Converse is a city in Bexar County, Texas, United States, 15 miles (24 km) northeast of downtown San Antonio. As of the 2020 census, it had a population of 27,466. It is part of the San Antonio metropolitan statistical area.

== History ==
Converse is on Farm to Market Road 1976, thirteen miles northeast of downtown San Antonio in northeastern Bexar County. It was named for the chief engineer of the Southern Pacific Railroad, a Major Converse, who in 1877 bought a tract of land including the townsite. A post office was established in 1878, and by 1885 a population of thirty was reported. In 1896 the town had a saloon, two cotton gins, and a grocery. In 1990, the community, originally settled by German farmers, reportedly had the oldest 4-H Club in Texas. A singing society, the Salatrillo Liederkranz, had been active for many years. The population in 1946 was 175; by 1965 the town had twenty-two businesses and 900 residents. Over time, Converse has become a suburb of San Antonio. In the 1980s, an influx of middle-class African Americans most of them first-time homeowners were attracted to developing communities northeast of San Antonio. Today, Converse is a prime example of wealthy, Black suburbs in the U.S. In 1990, the community had a population of 8,887, and in 1991 it had seventy-three businesses. In 2000 the population had grown to 11,508 with 390 businesses.

In 2017, Converse proposed the annexation of 12 mi^{2} of territory near Randolph Air Force Base in northeastern Bexar County. Several large commercial areas are included in the annexation. The additional land would be taken in a series of phased expansions until 2033. Once completed, the area of Converse would triple in size. Municipal services would become available to an often neglected part of the county. The San Antonio City Council has unanimously approved the annexation; now the measure goes before the Converse City Council and the county commissioners.

== Geography ==
Converse is located in eastern Bexar County. The Charles W. Anderson Loop highway around San Antonio passes along the eastern edge of Converse, separating it from Randolph Air Force Base. Converse is bordered by the cities of Live Oak and Universal City to the north, the city of Schertz to the southeast, and the city of San Antonio and unincorporated parts of Bexar County to the south and west.

According to the United States Census Bureau, Converse has a total area of 7.1 square miles (18.3 km^{2}), of which 7.0 square miles (18.1 km^{2}) are land and 0.077 square miles (0.2 km^{2}), or 1.28%, is covered by water.

== Demographics ==
Historical population
Census	Pop.	Note	%±
1970	1,383		—
1980	5,150		272.4%
1990	8,887		72.6%
2000	11,508		29.5%
2010	18,198		58.1%
2020	27,466		50.9%
U.S. Decennial Census

=== 2020 census ===
As of the 2020 census, Converse had a population of 27,466; the median age was 34.1 years, 27.8% of residents were under the age of 18, 10.7% were 65 years of age or older, and there were 93.1 males for every 100 females (89.2 males for every 100 females age 18 and over).

Ninety-nine point seven percent of residents lived in urban areas, while 0.3% lived in rural areas.

There were 9,206 households in Converse, of which 43.2% had children under the age of 18 living in them, 52.2% were married-couple households, 14.7% were households with a male householder and no spouse or partner present, and 26.3% were households with a female householder and no spouse or partner present; 18.6% of all households were made up of individuals and 6.2% had someone living alone who was 65 years of age or older.

There were 9,682 housing units, of which 4.9% were vacant; among occupied housing units, 70.0% were owner-occupied and 30.0% were renter-occupied, with homeowner and rental vacancy rates of 1.3% and 8.6%, respectively.

Racial composition as of the 2020 census
Race	Number	Percent
White	10,901	39.7%
Black or African American	6,079	22.1%
American Indian and Alaska Native	280	1.0%
Asian	791	2.9%
Native Hawaiian and Other Pacific Islander	154	0.6%
Some other race	3,280	11.9%
Two or more races	5,981	21.8%
Hispanic or Latino (of any race)	11,786	42.9%

== Climate ==
The climate in this area is characterized by hot, humid summers and generally mild to cool winters. According to the Köppen climate classification system, Converse has a humid subtropical climate, Cfa on climate maps.

== Education ==
Most of Converse is in the Judson Independent School District. A portion in the south is in the East Central Independent School District. The public high school of the latter is the East Central High School.

== Notable people ==
- NaLyssa Smith (born 2000), WNBA power forward who formally played for Indiana Fever. She is currently playing for the Dallas Wings. Smith was the winner of the Wade Trophy for 2020–21

== See also ==
- List of municipalities in Texas
