= National Register of Historic Places listings in Washington County, Missouri =

Location of Washington County in Missouri

This is a list of the National Register of Historic Places listings in Washington County, Missouri.

This is intended to be a complete list of the properties and districts on the National Register of Historic Places in Washington County, Missouri, United States. Latitude and longitude coordinates are provided for many National Register properties and districts; these locations may be seen together in a map.

There are 11 properties and districts listed on the National Register in the county.

This National Park Service list is complete through NPS recent listings posted August 7, 2026.

== Current listings ==
	Name on the Register	Image	Date listed	Location	City or town	Description
1	Caledonia Historic District	Caledonia Historic District	October 27, 1986 (#86003389)	Roughly bounded by Patrick, College, and Alexander Sts., and MO 21; 37°45′48″N 90°46′18″W	Caledonia	
2	Cresswell Petroglyph Archeological Site		February 12, 1971 (#71000482)	Address restricted	Fertile	
3	George Cresswell Furnace		May 23, 1988 (#88000613)	MO F 38°02′27″N 90°50′20″W	Potosi	
4	Land Archeological Site		May 5, 1972 (#72000734)	Address restricted	Caledonia	
5	Lost Creek Pictograph Archeological Site		January 25, 1971 (#71000481)	Address restricted	Caledonia	
6	Palmer Historic Mining District		November 29, 2010 (#10000964)	Surrounding Palmer for several miles in all directions 37°50′40″N 90°59′15″W	Potosi	More than 15 miles (24 km) of land in the Mark Twain National Forest
7	Harrison Queen House	Harrison Queen House	June 27, 2002 (#02000700)	Hwy C, 1.3 mi. W of MO 21; 37°46′48″N 90°47′55″W	Caledonia	
8	Susan Cave (23WA190)		July 8, 1989 (#89000758)	Address restricted	Shirley	
9	Washington County Courthouse	Washington County Courthouse	October 25, 2011 (#11000765)	102 N. Missouri St. 37°56′12″N 90°47′17″W	Potosi	
10	Washington State Park CCC Historic District	Washington State Park CCC Historic District	March 4, 1985 (#85000517)	Roughly bounded by MO 102 and MO 104; 38°05′01″N 90°41′13″W	Potosi	
11	Washington State Park Petroglyph Archeological Site	Washington State Park Petroglyph Archeological Site	April 3, 1970 (#70000352)	Address restricted	Fertile	

== See also ==
- List of National Historic Landmarks in Missouri
- National Register of Historic Places listings in Missouri
