= Allen Branch (Fourche a Renault tributary) =

Stream in Missouri, U.S.

Allen Branch Tributary to Fourche a Renault
- Location of Allen Branch mouth

Location
- Country: United States
- State: Missouri
- County: Washington

Physical characteristics
- Source: Lost Creek divide
  - location: about 5 miles south-southeast of Shirley, Missouri
  - coordinates: 37°51′54″N 90°54′09″W
  - elevation: 1,170 ft (360 m)
- Mouth: Fourche a Renault
  - location: about 0.5 miles south of Shirley, Missouri
  - coordinates: 37°55′43″N 90°55′01″W
  - elevation: 850 ft (260 m)
- Length: 3.15 mi (5.07 km)
- Basin size: 11.41 square miles (29.6 km^{2})
- Discharge
  - location: Fourche a Renault
  - average: 11.41 cu ft/s (0.323 m^{3}/s) at mouth with Fourche a Renault

Basin features
- Progression: Fourche a Renault → Mineral Fork → Big River → Meramec River → Mississippi River → Gulf of Mexico
- River system: Big River
- Tributaries
  - left: Race Creek
  - right: unnamed tributaries
- Bridges: Briar Patch Lane, MO 8, Sunnen Lake Road (x2)

Allen Branch is a stream in Washington County, Missouri. It is a tributary of Fourche a Renault.

Allen Branch has the name of John Allen, the original owner of the site.

== Course ==
Allen Branch rises approximately five miles south-southeast of the community of Shirley. The stream flows generally north passing under Missouri Route 8 past Shirley to join the Fourche a Renault about one half mile north of Shirley.

== Watershed ==
Allen Branch drains 11.41 square miles (29.6 km^{2}) of area, receives about 42.7 in/year of precipitation, has a wetness index of 334.51, and is about 88% forested.

== See also ==
- List of rivers of Missouri
