= Mine a Breton Creek =

Stream in the American state of Missouri

Mine a Breton Creek is a stream in Washington County in the U.S. state of Missouri. It is a tributary of Mineral Fork.

The stream headwaters arise at 37°53′07″N 90°47′22″W south of Potosi and its confluence with the Fourche a Renault at 38°01′44″N 90°51′12″W forms the Mineral Fork.

Mine a Breton Creek took its name from a nearby mine of the same name, which in turn has the name of Francois Azor dit Breton, a pioneer citizen.

== See also ==
- List of rivers of Missouri
