= Fertile (disambiguation) =

Fertile is a condition whereby organisms (including animals and humans) are able to produce physically healthy offspring.

Fertile may also refer to:

- Fertile, Iowa, a small city in the United States
- Fertile, Minnesota, a small city in the United States
- Fertile, Missouri, an unincorporated community
- Fertile, Saskatchewan, an unincorporated community in Canada
- "Fertile", a song by The Throes on Ameroafriasiana
- "Fertile", a landscape with the core area between the Syrian towns of Raqqa & - on the Turkish border - Ra's al-'Ayn

== See also ==
- Fertile material, nuclides from which fissile material can be generated
- Fertile soil, soil that can support plant growth
