= Race Creek =

Stream in the American state of Missouri

Race Creek is a stream in western Washington County in the U.S. state of Missouri. It is a tributary to Allen Branch.

The stream headwaters arise at 37°54′43″N 90°56′39″W. The stream flows east along the south side of Missouri Route 8 for approximately one mile then turns northeast crossing under Route 8 to its confluence with Allen Branch just north of the community of Shirley, Missouri at 37°55′05″N 90°55′17″W.

Race Creek was named for an old mill race along its course.

== See also ==
- List of rivers of Missouri
