= Scott Branch =

Stream in Washington County, Missouri, U.S.

Coordinates: 37.956714°N 90.927911°W

Scott Branch is a stream in Washington County in the U.S. state of Missouri. It is a tributary of Fourche a Renault.

Scott Branch has the name of Indigo Scott, a pioneer settler.

== See also ==
- List of rivers of Missouri
