= The 6000 lb Diaries with Dr. Now =

American reality television series

- Created by: Jonathan Nowzaradan
- Starring: Younan Nowzaradan, MD
- Theme music composer: MIBE Music
- Country of origin: United States
- Original language: English
- No. of seasons: 1
- No. of episodes: 10

Production
- Executive producers: Jonathan Nowzaradan; Paul Hogan
- Producer: Samantha Pennell
- Production locations: Houston, Texas
- Cinematography: Taylor Rudd
- Editors: Scott Hinsley; Dane Depinho
- Camera setup: Multi-camera
- Running time: 86 minutes
- Production company: Megalomedia

Original release
- Network: Lifetime
- Release: January 6, 2025 – present

The 6000 lb Diaries with Dr. Now is a reality series on Lifetime similar to My 600-lb Life. The series follows ten morbidly obese individuals, whose combined weight exceeds 6,000 pounds, as they pursue bariatric surgery and a chance at a new life with the help of surgeon Younan Nowzaradan. The show uses diary cams and confessionals to document the participants' emotional and physical struggles, with Dr. Now providing the tools and team of specialists needed to address their weight-related issues.

== Episodes ==
| No. | Title | Original release date | U.S. viewers (millions) |
|---|---|---|---|
| 1 | "Chelsey" | January 6, 2025 | N/A |
| 2 | "Destinee & Dynastiee - Part 1" | May 26, 2025 | N/A |
| 3 | "Destinee & Dynastiee - Part 2" | May 26, 2025 | N/A |
| 4 | "Grace" | June 2, 2025 | N/A |
| 5 | "Trista" | June 9, 2025 | N/A |
| 6 | "Caleb" | June 16, 2025 | N/A |
| 7 | "Crystal" | June 23, 2025 | N/A |
| 8 | "Sam" | June 30, 2025 | N/A |
| 9 | "Lauren" | July 7, 2025 | N/A |
| 10 | "Nefi" | July 14, 2025 | N/A |

== Subject outcomes ==
Season 1 subjects
| Episode | Patient | Age | Location | Starting weight | Ending weight | Weight loss |
|---|---|---|---|---|---|---|
| 1 | Chelsey Hall | 25 | Brenham, Texas | 628.4 lbs (296.2 kg) | | |
| 2/3 | Destinee Lewis | 27 | Little Rock, Arkansas | 606 lbs (274.9 kg) | | |
| 2/3 | Dynastiee Lewis | | Little Rock, Arkansas | 614 lbs (278.5 kg) | | |
| 4 | Grace Cox | | Coal Grove, Ohio | 621.5 lbs (281.7 kg) | | |
| 5 | Trista Klugh | | Lawrenceville, Georgia | 634.6 lbs (287.9 kg) | 591 lbs | 43.6 lbs |
| 6 | Caleb Turley | 20 | Webster Groves, Missouri | 804.5 lbs (364.9 kg) | 542 lbs | 262.5 lbs |
| 7 | Crystal Hedricks | | Mount Holly, North Carolina | 611 pounds | | |
| 8 | Sam | 42 | | 665 pounds | 482 lbs | 183 lbs |
| 9 | Lauren Ramos | | | 679.5 lbs (308.2 kg) | | |
| 10 | Nefi Edwin Cerpa | 25 | Houston, Texas | 626.9 lbs (284.4 kg) | | |
