= List of My 600-lb Life episodes =

My 600-lb Life is an American reality television series that airs on TLC. The series premiered in February 2012. The show also has its own spinoff: Where Are They Now?

As of February 12, 2025, 152 episodes of My 600-lb Life have aired, concluding the thirteenth season.

== Series overview ==
Season	Episodes	Originally released	
Season	Episodes	First released	Last released
1	6	February 1, 2012	March 26, 2012
2	8	January 7, 2014	February 25, 2014
3	10	January 7, 2015	April 8, 2015
4	12	January 6, 2016	May 18, 2016
5	14	January 4, 2017	April 16, 2017
6	16	January 3, 2018	May 9, 2018
7	20	January 2, 2019	May 15, 2019
8	16	January 1, 2020	April 15, 2020
9	13	December 30, 2020	March 24, 2021
10	15	November 3, 2021	February 9, 2022
11	8	February 1, 2023	March 22, 2023
12	7	March 6, 2024	April 17, 2024
13	7	January 1, 2025	February 12, 2025

== Episodes ==
=== Season 1 (2012) ===
No. overall	No. in season	Title	Original release date	U.S. viewers (millions)
1	1	"Melissa's Story (Part 1)"	February 1, 2012	N/A
2	2	"Melissa's Story (Part 2)"	February 1, 2012	N/A
3	3	"Donald's Story"	February 8, 2012	N/A
4	4	"Henry's Story"	February 15, 2012	N/A
5	5	"Ashley's Story"	February 22, 2012	N/A
6	6	"Where Are They Now?"	March 26, 2012	N/A

Season 1 subjects
Episode	Patient name	Starting age	Location	Starting weight	Ending weight (7 yrs)	Total weight loss (7 yrs.)	Notes
1/2	Melissa Morris	31 years old	Livingston, Texas	653 pounds (296 kg)	214 pounds (97 kg)	439 pounds (199 kg)	
3	Donald Shelton	34 years old	Pasadena, Texas	675 pounds (306 kg)	390 pounds (180 kg)	285 pounds (129 kg)	
4	Henry Foots	47 years old	Houston, Texas	715 pounds (324 kg)	275 pounds (125 kg)	440 pounds (200 kg)	Died of an illness unrelated to his weight on May 16, 2013. He was 54 years old.
5	Ashley Randall	24 years old	Killeen, Texas	617 pounds (280 kg)	253.1 pounds (114.8 kg)	364 pounds (165 kg)	Died of sepsis, complications related to sepsis, and pneumonia on October 2, 2021. She was 40 years old.

=== Season 2 (2014) ===
No. overall	No. in season	Title	Original release date	U.S. viewers (millions)
7	1	"Zsalynn's Story"	January 7, 2014	N/A
8	2	"Olivia's Story"	January 14, 2014	1.194
9	3	"Penny's Story"	January 21, 2014	N/A
10	4	"Chuck's Story"	January 28, 2014	1.537
11	5	"Christina's Story"	February 4, 2014	1.462
12	6	"Paula's Story"	February 11, 2014	1.486
13	7	"James' Story"	February 18, 2014	1.119
14	8	"Tara's Story"	February 25, 2014	1.177

Season 2 subjects
Episode	Patient name	Starting age	Location	Starting weight	Ending weight (12 mos.)	Total weight loss (12 mos. or from later peak weight (LPW))	Notes
1	Zsalynn Whitworth	42 years old	San Antonio, Texas	597.9 pounds (271.2 kg)	349.9 pounds (158.7 kg)	248 pounds (112 kg)	
2	Olivia Cruz	46 years old	Chicago, Illinois	580.5 pounds (263.3 kg)	241 pounds (109 kg)	339 pounds (154 kg)	
3	Penny Saeger	45 years old	Elkton, Maryland	530 pounds (240 kg)	495 pounds (225 kg)	35 pounds (16 kg)	
4	Chuck Turner	45 years old	Beaumont, Texas	693.7 pounds (314.7 kg)	268.5 pounds (121.8 kg)	425 pounds (193 kg)	
5	Christina Phillips	22 years old	Southaven, Mississippi	639.7 pounds (290.2 kg) (was 656.1 pounds before filming (297.1 kg))	390.1 pounds (176.9 kg)	266 pounds (121 kg) (EPW-earlier peak weight)	
6	Paula Jones	39 years old	Jonesboro, Georgia	533.8 pounds (242.1 kg) (later 550 pounds (249.4 kg))	379 pounds (172 kg)	171 pounds (78 kg) (LPW)	
7	James Jones	37 years old	Frankston, Texas	728.7 pounds (330.5 kg)	376.7 pounds (170.9 kg)	352 pounds (160 kg)	
8	Tara Taylor	35 years old	Lafayette, Louisiana	606.1 pounds (274.9 kg)	328 pounds (149 kg)	278 pounds (126 kg)	

=== Season 3 (2015) ===
No. overall	No. in season	Title	Original release date	U.S. viewers (millions)
15	1	"Amber's Story"	February 4, 2015	1.010
16	2	"Susan's Story"	February 11, 2015	0.936
17	3	"Pauline's Story"	February 18, 2015	0.786
18	4	"Bettie Jo's Story"	February 25, 2015	1.321
19	5	"Angel's Story"	March 4, 2015	1.043
20	6	"Joe's Story"	March 11, 2015	1.136
21	7	"Laura's Story"	March 18, 2015	1.280
22	8	"Charity's Story"	March 25, 2015	1.446
23	9	"Chay's Story"	April 1, 2015	1.200
24	10	"Marla's Story"	April 8, 2015	1.624

Season 3 subjects
Episode	Patient name	Starting age	Location	Starting weight	Ending weight (12 mos.)	Total weight loss (12 mos. or from later peak weight (LPW))	Notes
1	Amber Rachdi	23 years old	Troutdale, Oregon	657.6 pounds (298.3 kg)	390.5 pounds (177.1 kg)	267 pounds (121 kg)	
2	Susan Farmer	37 years old	Eddy, Texas	607.6 pounds (275.6 kg)	340 pounds (150 kg)	267 pounds (121 kg)	
3	Pauline Potter	50 years old	Sacramento, California	673.5 pounds (305.5 kg) (later 677 pounds (307 kg))	529 pounds (240 kg)	149 pounds (68 kg) (LPW)	Deceased, age 62
4	Bettie Jo Elmore	24 years old	Potosi, Missouri	654 pounds (297 kg)	498.7 pounds (226.2 kg)	156 pounds (71 kg)	
5	Angel Parrish	42 years old	Kerrville, Texas	570 pounds (260 kg)	261.8 pounds (118.8 kg)	309 pounds (140 kg)	
6	Joe Wexler	31 years old	Johnson City, Tennessee	777 pounds (352 kg) (later 792.6 pounds (359.5 kg))	592.6 pounds (268.8 kg)	200 pounds (91 kg) (LPW)	
7	Laura Perez	41 years old	San Antonio, Texas	594.6 pounds (269.7 kg)	357.8 pounds (162.3 kg)	237 pounds (108 kg)	Deceased, age 48
8	Charity Pierce	39 years old	Cedar Rapids, Iowa	778.8 pounds (353.3 kg)	496.6 pounds (225.3 kg)	282 pounds (128 kg)	Deceased, age 50
9	Chay Guillory	23 years old	Charenton, Louisiana	597.5 pounds (271.0 kg)	478.7 pounds (217.1 kg)	119 pounds (54 kg)	
10	Marla McCants	43 years old	Nashville, Tennessee	800 pounds (360 kg) (estimated)	534.2 pounds (242.3 kg)	266 pounds (121 kg) (estimated)	

=== Season 4 (2016) ===
No. overall	No. in season	Title	Original release date	U.S. viewers (millions)
25	1	"Nikki's Story"	January 6, 2016	N/A
26	2	"Brittani's Story"	January 13, 2016	N/A
27	3	"Chad's Story"	January 20, 2016	N/A
28	4	"June's Story"	January 27, 2016	N/A
29	5	"Dottie's Story"	February 3, 2016	N/A
30	6	"Gideon's Story"	February 10, 2016	N/A
31	7	"Ashley D's Story"	February 17, 2016	N/A
32	8	"Teretha's Story"	February 24, 2016	N/A
33	9	"Randy's Story"	March 2, 2016	N/A
34	10	"Milla's Story"	March 9, 2016	N/A
35	11	"Sean's Story"	March 16, 2016	N/A
36	12	"Lupe's Story"	March 23, 2016	N/A

Season 4 subjects
Episode	Patient name	Starting age	Location	Starting weight	Ending weight (12 mos.)	Total weight loss (12 mos. or from later peak weight (LPW))	Notes
1	Nikki Webster	33 years old	Little Rock, Arkansas	649.7 pounds (294.7 kg)	443.4 pounds (201.1 kg)	206 pounds (93 kg)	
2	Brittani Fulfer	32 years old	Tualatin, Oregon	605 pounds (274 kg)	375.6 pounds (170.4 kg)	230 pounds (100 kg)	
3	Chad Dean	42 years old	Hagerstown, Maryland	701.4 pounds (318.1 kg)	441.5 pounds (200.3 kg)	260 pounds (120 kg)	
4	June McCamey	43 years old	Houston, Texas	590.5 pounds (267.8 kg)	389.2 pounds (176.5 kg)	201 pounds (91 kg)	
5	Dottie Perkins	34 years old	Oxford, Mississippi	641 pounds (291 kg) (later 669 pounds (303.4 kg))	520 pounds (240 kg)	149 pounds (68 kg) (LPW)	Deceased, aged 44. Died on June 14th 2025.
6	Gideon Yeakley	33 years old	Mustang, Oklahoma	649.9 pounds (294.8 kg)	429.6 pounds (194.9 kg)	220 pounds (100 kg)	
7	Ashley Dunn-Bratcher	27 years old	Kemp, Texas	725.1 pounds (328.9 kg)	470.5 pounds (213.4 kg)	255 pounds (116 kg)	
8	Teretha Hollis-Neely	47 years old	Detroit, Michigan	800 pounds (360 kg) (estimated)	461 pounds (209 kg)	339 pounds (154 kg) (estimated)	
9	Randy Statum	35 years old	Hull, Texas	655.9 pounds (297.5 kg)	441.9 pounds (200.4 kg)	214 pounds (97 kg)	
10	Milla Clark	47 years old	Fayetteville, Tennessee	751 pounds (341 kg)	598 pounds (271 kg)	153 pounds (69 kg)	
11	Sean Milliken	26 years old	Cameron Park, California	919 pounds (417 kg) (later 1,003 pounds (455 kg))	548 pounds (249 kg)	455 pounds (206 kg) (LPW)	Died February 17, 2019 from cardiac arrest due to an infection from poor hygiene, after having gained over 150 lbs during the previous four weeks. He was 29 years old.
12	Lupe Samano	39 years old	San Bernardino, California	642 pounds (291 kg) (later 655 pounds (297.1 kg))	360 pounds (160 kg)	295 pounds (134 kg) (LPW)	Deceased, age 50.

=== Season 5 (2017) ===
No. overall	No. in season	Title	Original release date	U.S. viewers (millions)
37	1	"Brandi and Kandi's Story"	January 4, 2017	1.498
38	2	"Ashley R's Story"	January 11, 2017	1.278
39	3	"Cynthia's Story"	January 18, 2017	1.365
40	4	"Kirsten's Story"	January 25, 2017	1.317
41	5	"Doug's Story"	February 1, 2017	1.396
42	6	"Erica's Story"	February 8, 2017	1.421
43	7	"Diana's Story"	February 15, 2017	1.230
44	8	"Michael's Story"	February 22, 2017	1.200
45	9	"Nicole's Story"	March 1, 2017	1.321
46	10	"Tanisha's Story"	March 8, 2017	1.092
47	11	"James K's Story"	March 15, 2017	1.311
48	12	"Tracey's Story"	March 22, 2017	1.334
49	13	"Steven and Justin's Story Part 1"	March 29, 2017	1.394
50	14	"Steven and Justin's Story Part 2"	April 5, 2017	1.722

Season 5 subjects
Episode	Patient name	Starting age	Location	Starting weight	Ending weight (12 mos.)	Total weight loss (12 mos. or from later peak weight (LPW))	Notes
1	Brandi Dreier	29 years old	Vancouver, Washington	587.9 pounds (266.7 kg)	360 pounds (160 kg)	228 pounds (103 kg)	
1	Kandi Dreier	29 years old	Vancouver, Washington	604.7 pounds (274.3 kg)	384 pounds (174 kg)	220 pounds (100 kg)	
2	Ashley Reyes	30 years old	West Hills, California	668.8 pounds (303.4 kg)	414 pounds (188 kg)	254 pounds (115 kg)	
3	Cynthia Wells	42 years old	Oklahoma City, Oklahoma	610.3 pounds (276.8 kg)	454 pounds (206 kg)	156 pounds (71 kg)	
4	Kirsten Perez	38 years old	Longview, Washington	612.5 pounds (277.8 kg)	442 pounds (200 kg)	170 pounds (77 kg)	
5	Doug Armstrong	36 years old	Wichita Falls, Texas	684.8 pounds (310.6 kg)	462.4 pounds (209.7 kg)	222 pounds (101 kg)	
6	Erica Wall	44 years old	Lompoc, California	661.6 pounds (300.1 kg)	471 pounds (214 kg)	190 pounds (86 kg)	
7	Diana Bunch	55 years old	Seattle, Washington	601.1 pounds (272.7 kg)	336 pounds (152 kg)	265 pounds (120 kg)	
8	Michael Dominguez	32 years old	Glendale, Arizona	635.9 pounds (288.4 kg)	348.7 pounds (158.2 kg)	287 pounds (130 kg)	
9	Nicole Lewis	23 years old	Marion, Ohio	684.6 pounds (310.5 kg)	521.3 pounds (236.5 kg)	163 pounds (74 kg)	
10	Tanisha Cleveland	32 years old	Silsbee, Texas	588.7 pounds (267.0 kg) (later 603 pounds (274 kg))	484 pounds (220 kg)	119 pounds (54 kg)	Took place over 2 years
11	James King	46 years old	Paducah, Kentucky	735 pounds (333 kg) (later 843 pounds (382 kg))	788.6 pounds (357.7 kg), dismissed from program in Month 11	55 pounds (25 kg) (LPW)	Died on April 3, 2020, from multiple organ failure due to his obesity at age 49
12	Tracey Matthews	45 years old	Lorain, Ohio	605.9 pounds (274.8 kg)	388 pounds (176 kg)	218 pounds (99 kg)	
13/14	Steven Assanti	33 years old	Cranston, Rhode Island	730.8 pounds (331.5 kg) (later 808.5 pounds (366.7 kg))	677.5 pounds (307.3 kg)	131 pounds (59 kg) (LPW)	Took place over 1 year and 10 months
13/14	Justin Assanti	27 years old	Cranston, Rhode Island	604.2 pounds (274.1 kg)	432.0 pounds (195.9 kg)	172 pounds (79 kg)	

=== Season 6 (2018) ===
No. overall	No. in season	Title	Original release date	U.S. viewers (millions)
51	1	"Rena & Lee's Story"	January 10, 2018	1.594
52	2	"Janine's Story"	January 17, 2018	1.567
53	3	"Alicia's Story"	January 24, 2018	1.507
54	4	"Liz's Story"	January 31, 2018	1.467
55	5	"Karina's Story"	February 7, 2018	1.376
56	6	"James B's Story"	February 14, 2018	1.226
57	7	"Lisa's Story"	February 21, 2018	1.366
58	8	"Robert's Story"	February 28, 2018	1.407
59	9	"Tamy Lyn's Story"	March 7, 2018	1.475
60	10	"Benji & David's Story"	March 14, 2018	1.328
61	11	"Renee's Story"	March 21, 2018	1.451
62	12	"Sarah's Story"	March 28, 2018	1.238
63	13	"Schenee's Story"	April 4, 2018	1.423
64	14	"Jennifer & Marissa's Story"	April 11, 2018	1.353
65	15	"One Ton Family: Part 1"	May 2, 2018	1.276
66	16	"One Ton Family: Part 2"	May 9, 2018	1.179

Season 6 subjects
Episode	Patient name	Starting age	Location	Starting weight	Ending weight (12 mos.)	Total weight loss (12 mos. or from later peak weight (LPW))	Notes
1	Rena Kiser	39 years old	Houston, Missouri	549 pounds (249 kg)	278 pounds (126 kg)	271 pounds (123 kg)	
1	Lee Sutton	42 years old	Houston, Missouri	714 pounds (324 kg)	411 pounds (186 kg)	303 pounds (137 kg)	Deceased, aged 51
2	Janine Mueller	53 years old	Seattle, Washington	678.2 pounds (307.6 kg)	566 pounds (257 kg)	112 pounds (51 kg)	
3	Liz Evans	35 years old	Freeport, Texas	721.3 pounds (327.2 kg)	368 pounds (167 kg)	353 pounds (160 kg)	
4	Alicia Kirgan	32 years old	Madison, Illinois	622.3 pounds (282.3 kg)	436 pounds (198 kg)	186 pounds (84 kg)	
5	Karina Garcia	38 years old	Converse, Texas	633.2 pounds (287.2 kg)	398 pounds (181 kg)	235 pounds (107 kg)	
6	James "L.B." Bonner	29 years old	Lexington, South Carolina	642.3 pounds (291.3 kg)	326 pounds (148 kg)	316 pounds (143 kg)	Died by suicide on August 2, 2018, at the age of 30
7	Lisa Fleming	49 years old	Mobile, AL	704.3 pounds (319.5 kg)	628 pounds (285 kg), dismissed from program in Month 6	76 pounds (34 kg)	Died of an undisclosed illness on August 23, 2018, unrelated to her weight, at the age of 50
8	Robert Buchel	41 years old	Forked River, New Jersey	842.1 pounds (382.0 kg)	502 pounds (228 kg)	340 pounds (150 kg)	Died of a heart attack during filming in Month 9 at the age of 41.
9	Tamy Lyn Murrell	45 years old	Covington, Kentucky	591.7 pounds (268.4 kg)	346.2 pounds (157.0 kg)	246 pounds (112 kg)	
10	David Bolton	35 years old	Houston, Texas	747.1 pounds (338.9 kg)	386 pounds (175 kg)	361 pounds (164 kg)	
10	Benji Bolton	32 years old	Houston, Texas	582.5 pounds (264.2 kg)	218 pounds (99 kg)	364 pounds (165 kg)	
11	Renee Biran	53 years old	Valdosta, Georgia	631.8 pounds (286.6 kg)	381 pounds (173 kg)	250 pounds (110 kg)	Died, aged 56
12	Sarah Neeley	25 years old	Dayton, Ohio	642.3 pounds (291.3 kg) (later 653 pounds (296 kg))	393 pounds (178 kg)	260 pounds (120 kg)	
13	Schenee Murry-Hawkins	27 years old	Indianapolis, IN	665.2 pounds (301.7 kg)	664.4 pounds (301.4 kg), dismissed from program in Month 8	0.8 pounds (0.36 kg)	
14	Jennifer Jess	42 years old	Bend, Oregon	636.3 pounds (288.6 kg)	426 pounds (193 kg)	210 pounds (95 kg)	
14	Marissa Jess	26 years old	Bend, Oregon	573.1 pounds (260.0 kg)	341 pounds (155 kg)	232 pounds (105 kg)	
15/16	Roshanda Perrio	30 years old	Lafayette, Louisiana	803.7 pounds (364.6 kg)	605.7 pounds (274.7 kg) (@11 mos.)	198 pounds (90 kg) (@11 mos.)	
15/16	Brandie Perrio	29 years old	Lafayette, Louisiana	620.6 pounds (281.5 kg)	382.3 pounds (173.4 kg) (@11 mos.)	238 pounds (108 kg) (@11 mos.)	
15/16	Clarence Perrio	33 years old	Lafayette, Louisiana	582.7 pounds (264.3 kg)	437.9 pounds (198.6 kg) (@11 mos.)	145 pounds (66 kg) (@11 mos.)	

=== Season 7 (2019) ===
No. overall	No. in season	Title	Original release date	U.S. viewers (millions)
67	1	"Octavia's Story"	January 2, 2019	1.195
68	2	"Brianne's Story"	January 9, 2019	1.256
69	3	"Robin's Story"	January 16, 2019	1.300
70	4	"Justin's Story"	January 23, 2019	1.141
71	5	"Holly's Story"	January 30, 2019	1.132
72	6	"Lacey's Story"	February 6, 2019	1.203
73	7	"Brandon's Story"	February 13, 2019	1.219
74	8	"Maja's Story"	February 20, 2019	1.250
75	9	"Tiffany's Story"	February 27, 2019	N/A
76	10	"Destinee's Story"	March 6, 2019	N/A
77	11	"Jeanne's Story"	March 13, 2019	N/A
78	12	"Aaron's Story"	March 20, 2019	N/A
79	13	"Kelly's Story"	March 27, 2019	N/A
80	14	"Annjeanette's Story"	April 3, 2019	N/A
81	15	"Angela's Story"	April 10, 2019	N/A
82	16	"LaShanta's Story"	April 17, 2019	N/A
83	17	"Cillas' Story"	April 24, 2019	N/A
84	18	"Mercedes' Story"	May 1, 2019	N/A
85	19	"Angie J's Story"	May 8, 2019	N/A
86	20	"Vianey and Allen's Story"	May 15, 2019	N/A

Season 7 subjects
Episode	Patient name	Starting age	Location	Starting weight	Ending weight (12 mos.)	Total weight loss (12 mos. or from later peak weight (LPW))	Notes
1	Octavia Gahagans	42 years old	Kansas City, Missouri	692.3 pounds (314.0 kg)	456 pounds (207 kg)	236 pounds (107 kg)	
2	Brianne Dias	30 years old	Florence, Oregon	742.2 pounds (336.7 kg)	358 pounds (162 kg) (@11 mos.)	384 pounds (174 kg) (@11 mos.)	
3	Robin Mckinley	40 years old	Meade, Kansas	648.7 pounds (294.2 kg)	395 pounds (179 kg)	253 pounds (115 kg)	
3	Garrett Rogers	20 years old	Meade, Kansas	607.3 pounds (275.5 kg)	337 pounds (153 kg)	270 pounds (120 kg)	
4	Justin McSwain	27 years old	Rock Hill, South Carolina	687.5 pounds (311.8 kg)	353.5 pounds (160.3 kg)	334 pounds (151 kg)	
5	Holly Hager	38 years old	Ellijay, Georgia	658.1 pounds (298.5 kg)	418 pounds (190 kg)	240 pounds (110 kg)	
6	Lacey Hodder	29 years old	Bay City, Michigan	691.2 pounds (313.5 kg)	435 pounds (197 kg)	256 pounds (116 kg)	
7	Brandon Scott	33 years old	Columbus, Ohio	718.4 pounds (325.9 kg)	383.7 pounds (174.0 kg)	335 pounds (152 kg)	
8	Maja Radanovic	33 years old	Portland, Oregon	689.4 pounds (312.7 kg)	592.5 pounds (268.8 kg), left program in Month 8	96.9 pounds (44.0 kg)	
9	Tiffany Barker	28 years old	Marysville, Washington	672.5 pounds (305.0 kg)	415 pounds (188 kg)	257 pounds (117 kg)	
10	Destinee LaShaee	27 years old	Pineville, Louisiana	669 pounds (303 kg)	440 pounds (200 kg)	229 pounds (104 kg)	First out transgender patient on the show. Deceased, age 31
11	Jeanne Covey	39 years old	Big Sandy, Texas	702.4 pounds (318.6 kg)	670.7 pounds (304.2 kg), left program in Month 6	32 pounds (15 kg)	
12	Aaron Washer	30 years old	New Braunfels, Texas	718.1 pounds (325.7 kg)	402.7 pounds (182.7 kg)	316 pounds (143 kg)	
13	Kelly Mason	41 years old	Greensboro, North Carolina	725.5 pounds (329.1 kg)	383 pounds (174 kg)	342 pounds (155 kg)	Died of heart failure during filming in Month 10 on the eve of her 42nd birthday. Deceased, age 41
14	Annjeanette Whaley	30 years old	Hillsboro, Oregon	679.1 pounds (308.0 kg)	405 pounds (184 kg)	274 pounds (124 kg)	
15	Angela Gutierrez	44 years old	Ross, Ohio	608.4 pounds (276.0 kg)	No second weigh-in, left program in Month 8	Unknown	Deceased, age 49
16	LaShanta White	39 years old	Kenner, Louisiana	662 pounds (300 kg) (later 689.5 pounds (312.7 kg))	529.5 pounds (240.2 kg), briefly dismissed from program in Month 9	160 pounds (73 kg) (LPW)	
17	Cillas Givens	35 years old	Fairview, Oklahoma	729 pounds (331 kg)	313 pounds (142 kg)	416 pounds (189 kg)	
18	Mercedes Cephas	37 years old	Cincinnati, Ohio	773.2 pounds (350.7 kg)	692 pounds (314 kg)	81 pounds (37 kg)	
19	Angela Johns	39 years old	Massillon, Ohio	643.3 pounds (291.8 kg)	594.6 pounds (269.7 kg), dismissed from program in Month 8	49 pounds (22 kg)	
20	Vianey Rodriguez	35 years old	Chicago, Illinois	594.8 pounds (269.8 kg) (1st weigh-in at month 4)	369 pounds (167 kg) (@month 12)	225 pounds (102 kg) (@month 12)	Died due to complicatons of pneumonia, age 41
20	Allen Lewis	51 years old	Chicago, Illinois	648.1 pounds (294.0 kg) (1st weigh-in at month 4)	376 pounds (171 kg) (@month 12)	272 pounds (123 kg) (@month 12)	

=== Season 8 (2020) ===
No. overall	No. in season	Title	Original release date	U.S. viewers (millions)
87	1	"John and Lonnie's Story"	January 1, 2020	N/A
88	2	"Lindsey's Story"	January 8, 2020	N/A
89	3	"Bethany's Story"	January 15, 2020	N/A
90	4	"JT's Story"	January 22, 2020	N/A
91	5	"Gina's Story"	January 29, 2020	N/A
92	6	"Travis's Story"	February 5, 2020	N/A
93	7	"Joyce's Story"	February 12, 2020	N/A
94	8	"Carlton and Shantel's Story"	February 19, 2020	N/A
95	9	"Seana's Story"	February 26, 2020	N/A
96	10	"Ashley B's Story"	March 4, 2020	N/A
97	11	"Tommy's Story"	March 11, 2020	N/A
98	12	"Coliesa's Story"	March 18, 2020	N/A
99	13	"Dominic's Story"	March 25, 2020	N/A
100	14	"Megan's Story"	April 1, 2020	N/A
101	15	"Ashley T's Story"	April 8, 2020	N/A
102	16	"Leneatha's Story"	April 15, 2020	N/A

Season 8 subjects
Episode	Patient name	Starting age	Location	Starting weight	Ending weight (12 mos.)	Total weight loss (12 mos. or from later peak weight (LPW))	Notes
1	John Hambrick	34 years old	Wylie, Texas	686.5 pounds (311.4 kg)	393 pounds (178 kg)	294 pounds (133 kg)	
1	Lonnie Hambrick	35 years old	Haltom City, Texas	612.7 pounds (277.9 kg)	368 pounds (167 kg)	245 pounds (111 kg)	
2	Lindsey Witte	39 years old	Hills, Iowa	647.6 pounds (293.7 kg)	438 pounds (199 kg)	209 pounds (95 kg)	
3	Bethany Stout	40 years old	Alva, Oklahoma	607.9 pounds (275.7 kg)	502.2 pounds (227.8 kg), left the program in Month 11	105 pounds (48 kg)	
4	Julius (J.T.) Clark	32 years old	Claremore, Oklahoma	892.2 pounds (404.7 kg)	491 pounds (223 kg)	401 pounds (182 kg)	
5	Gina Krasley	28 years old	Tuckerton, New Jersey	606.7 pounds (275.2 kg)(later 614.4 pounds (278.7 kg))	556.2 pounds (252.3 kg)	58.2 pounds (26.4 kg)	Deceased, age 30.
6	Travis Henry	31 years old	Carrollton, Texas	617.3 pounds (280.0 kg)	379 pounds (172 kg)	238 pounds (108 kg)	
7	Joyce Del Viscovo	44 years old	Gardner, Kansas	759.2 pounds (344.4 kg)	623.8 pounds (283.0 kg), left the program in month 9	134.4 pounds (61.0 kg)	
8	Carlton Oglesby	24 years old	Columbus, Ohio	786 pounds (357 kg)	544 pounds (247 kg)	242 pounds (110 kg) (@6 mos.)	ended at 6 mos.
8	Shantel Oglesby	31 years old	Columbus, Ohio	638 pounds (289 kg)	424 pounds (192 kg)	214 pounds (97 kg) (@6 mos.)	ended at 6 mos.
9	Seana Collins	22 years old	Kansas City, Missouri	659 pounds (299 kg)	661.3 pounds (300.0 kg)	−2.3 pounds (−1.0 kg) (gained weight)	
10	Ashley Bernard	31 years old	Carencro, Louisiana	637 pounds (289 kg)	504 pounds (229 kg)	133 pounds (60 kg)	
11	Tommy Johnson	38 years old	Winnsboro, Louisiana	641 pounds (291 kg)	423 pounds (192 kg)	218 pounds (99 kg)	
12	Coliesa McMillian	41 years old	New Roads, Louisiana	643 pounds (292 kg)	499 pounds (226 kg)	144 pounds (65 kg) (@6 mos.)	Died on September 22, 2020, after being treated in ICU for two weeks due to acute kidney failure and other complications related to weight loss surgery.
13	Dominic Hernandez	37 years old	Fresno, California	672 pounds (305 kg)	650 pounds (290 kg) (@month 6)	22 pounds (10.0 kg) (@month 6)	Removed from program at month 6. First patient in the show to be currently homeless.
14	Megan Davis	24 years old	Taylorville, Illinois	604.7 pounds (274.3 kg)	481 pounds (218 kg)	123 pounds (56 kg)	
15	Ashley Taylor	24 years old	Temple, Texas	486 pounds (220 kg)	469 pounds (213 kg)	17 pounds (7.7 kg) (@ 6 mos.)	ended at 6 mos.
16	Leneatha Reed	40 years old	Meridian, Mississippi	604 pounds (274 kg)	575 pounds (261 kg) (@month 6)	29 pounds (13 kg) (@month 6)	left the program at month 9

=== Season 9 (2020–2021) ===
No. overall	No. in season	Title	Original release date	U.S. viewers (millions)
103	1	"Samantha's Story"	December 30, 2020	N/A
104	2	"Thederick's Story"	January 6, 2021	N/A
105	3	"Carrie's Story"	January 13, 2021	N/A
106	4	"Cindy's Story"	January 20, 2021	N/A
107	5	"Melissa M's Story"	January 27, 2021	N/A
108	6	"Kenae's Story"	February 3, 2021	N/A
109	7	"Krystal's Story"	February 10, 2021	N/A
110	8	"Isaac's Story"	February 17, 2021	N/A
111	9	"Michael's Story"	February 24, 2021	N/A
112	10	"Shannon's Story"	March 3, 2021	0.81
113	11	"Irene's Story"	March 10, 2021	N/A
114	12	"Tammy's Story"	March 17, 2021	N/A
115	13	"Chrystal's Story"	March 24, 2021	N/A

Season 9 subjects
Episode	Patient name	Starting age	Location	Starting weight	Ending weight (12 mos.)	Total weight loss (12 mos. or from later peak weight (LPW))	Notes
1	Samantha Mason	35 years old	Denver, Colorado	940.1 pounds (426.4 kg) (later 974 pounds (442 kg))	496 pounds (225 kg)	478 pounds (217 kg) (LPW)	Largest weight loss of any patient featured in the show
2	Thederick Barnes	32 years old	Gretna, Florida	740.2 pounds (335.7 kg)	615 pounds (279 kg) (@5th month)	125.2 pounds (56.8 kg) (@5th month)	last weighing at 5th month
3	Carrie Johnson	37 years old	Huntington, Texas	603 pounds (274 kg)	409 pounds (186 kg)	194 pounds (88 kg)	
4	Cindy Vela	45 years old	Portland, Texas	614 pounds (279 kg)(later 617 pounds (280 kg))	575 pounds (261 kg)	42 pounds (19 kg)	
5	Melissa Marescot	36 years old	Sunrise, Florida	592.8 pounds (268.9 kg)	440.3 pounds (199.7 kg)	152.5 pounds (69.2 kg)	
6	Kenae Dolphus	41 years old	Nacogdoches, Texas	614.6 pounds (278.8 kg)	543.8 pounds (246.7 kg)	70.8 pounds (32.1 kg)	
7	Krystal Hall	34 years old	Frankfort, Ohio	618.4 pounds (280.5 kg)	556 pounds (252 kg)	62 pounds (28 kg)	
8	Isaac Martinez	23 years old	Hutchins, Texas	661.1 pounds (299.9 kg)	539.0 pounds (244.5 kg)	122.1 pounds (55.4 kg)	
9	Michael Blair	43 years old	Conroe, Texas	609.5 pounds (276.5 kg)	474.0 pounds (215.0 kg)	135.5 pounds (61.5 kg)	
10	Shannon Lowery	39 years old	Tucson, Arizona	739 pounds (335 kg)	698 pounds (317 kg)	41 pounds (19 kg)	Took place over 1 year and 2 months
11	Irene Walker	39 years old	Houston, Texas	603.7 pounds (273.8 kg)	535.1 pounds (242.7 kg)	68.6 pounds (31.1 kg)	Took place over 1 year and 4 months
12	Tammy Patton	41 years old	Wichita Falls, Texas	594 pounds (269 kg)	468 pounds (212 kg)	126 pounds (57 kg)	Took place over 1 year and 5 months
13	Chrystal Rollins	39 years old	Spring Valley, California	610.8 pounds (277.1 kg)	498.3 pounds (226.0 kg) (@8th month)	113.5 pounds (51.5 kg) (@8th month)	Ended at Month 9

=== Season 10 (2021–2022) ===
No. overall	No. in season	Title	Original release date	U.S. viewers (millions)
116	1	"Nathan's Journey"	November 3, 2021	N/A
117	2	"Julian's Journey"	November 10, 2021	N/A
118	3	"Bianca's Journey"	November 17, 2021	N/A
119	4	"Mike's Journey"	November 24, 2021	N/A
120	5	"Lacey's Journey"	December 1, 2021	N/A
121	6	"Paul's Story"	December 8, 2021	N/A
122	7	"Ryan's Story"	December 15, 2021	N/A
123	8	"James B's Journey"	December 22, 2021	N/A
124	9	"Lucas' Journey"	December 29, 2021	N/A
125	10	"Margaret's Journey"	January 5, 2022	N/A
126	11	"Ontreon's Journey"	January 12, 2022	N/A
127	12	"Dolly's Journey"	January 19, 2022	N/A
128	13	"Larry's Journey"	January 26, 2022	N/A
129	14	"Lisa E's Journey"	February 2, 2022	0.88
130	15	"David's Journey"	February 9, 2022	0.81

Season 10 subjects
Episode	Patient name	Starting age	Location	Starting weight	Ending weight (12 mos.)	Total weight loss (12 mos. or from later peak weight (LPW))	Notes
1	Nathan Prater	35 years old	Palestine, Texas	607.2 pounds (275.4 kg)	414 pounds (188 kg)	193 pounds (88 kg)	
2	Julian Valentine	33 years old	Tucson, Arizona	830.2 pounds (376.6 kg)	639 pounds (290 kg)	191 pounds (87 kg)	
3	Bianca Hayes	36 years old	Fayetteville, Tennessee	604.2 pounds (274.1 kg)	448.4 pounds (203.4 kg)	155.8 pounds (70.7 kg)	
4	Mike Meginness	37 years old	Marion, Ohio	745.7 pounds (338.2 kg)	510.1 pounds (231.4 kg)	235.6 pounds (106.9 kg)	
5	Lacey Buckingham	36 years old	Kennewick, Washington	593.2 pounds (269.1 kg)	581.9 pounds (263.9 kg)	11.3 pounds (5.1 kg)	Ended at Month 6
6	Paul MacNeill	35 years old	Auburndale, Florida	757.0 pounds (343.4 kg)	641.0 pounds (290.8 kg)	116.0 pounds (52.6 kg)	Ended at Month 6. Died in a car crash in September 2023, aged 37.
7	Ryan Barkdoll	31 years old	Columbia Falls, Montana	740 pounds (340 kg)	Estimated above 660 pounds (300 kg)	80.0 pounds (36.3 kg)	Ended at Month 10. First patient to have failed to show up for Dr. Nowzaradan's appointments for the entirety of the episode
8	James Bedard	38 years old	New York, New York	625.0 pounds (283.5 kg)	506.1 pounds (229.6 kg)	119 pounds (54 kg)	Ended at Month 12
9	Lucas Higdon	33 years old	Conroe, Texas	619.3 pounds (280.9 kg)	401.0 pounds (181.9 kg)	218 pounds (99 kg)	
10	Margaret Johnson	35 years old	Baytown, Texas	752 pounds (341 kg)	516 pounds (234 kg)	236 pounds (107 kg)	
11	Ontreon Shannon	36 years old	Plano, Texas	702.4 pounds (318.6 kg)	704.3 pounds (319.5 kg)	−1.9 pounds (−0.86 kg) (gained weight)	
12	Dolly Martinez	25 years old	Fort Worth, Texas	593.2 pounds (269.1 kg)	552.8 pounds (250.7 kg)	40.4 pounds (18.3 kg) (@month 10)	Died of congestive heart failure, aged 30
13	Larry Myers	45 years old	Albany, New York	648 pounds (294 kg)	529.9 pounds (240.4 kg)	118.1 pounds (53.6 kg)	Died of a heart attack, age 49
14	Lisa Ebberson	51 years old	Fairbury, Nebraska	637 pounds (289 kg)	554 pounds (251 kg)	83 pounds (38 kg)	Quit in month 4, briefly reconnected in month 8, never saw Dr Now in person
15	David Nelson	30 years old	Idaho Falls, Idaho	762 pounds (346 kg)	608 pounds (276 kg)	154 pounds (70 kg)	

=== Season 11 (2023) ===
No. overall	No. in season	Title	Original release date	U.S. viewers (millions)
131	1	"Geno and Nico's Journey"	February 1, 2023	N/A
132	2	"Latonya's Journey"	February 8, 2023	N/A
133	3	"Wess' Journey"	February 15, 2023	N/A
134	4	"Syreeta's Journey"	February 22, 2023	N/A
135	5	"Mark's Journey"	March 1, 2023	N/A
136	6	"Stephanie's Journey"	March 8, 2023	N/A
137	7	"Chris P's Journey"	March 15, 2023	N/A
138	8	"Patrick's Journey"	March 22, 2023	N/A

Season 11 subjects
Episode	Patient name	Starting age	Location	Starting weight	Ending weight (12 mos.)	Total weight loss (12 mos. or from later peak weight (LPW))	Notes
1	Geno Dacunto	30 years old	New Haven, Connecticut	684.8 pounds (310.6 kg)	422 pounds (191 kg)	262 pounds (119 kg)	
1	Nico Martone	about 30 years old	New Haven, Connecticut	431.0 pounds (195.5 kg)	302 pounds (137 kg)	129 pounds (59 kg)	
2	Latonya Pottain	37 years old	Shreveport, Louisiana	632.6 pounds (286.9 kg)(later 642 pounds (291 kg))	599.1 pounds (271.7 kg) (@month 8)	43 pounds (20 kg) (LPW)	Deceased, aged 40
3	Wess Schulze	36 years old	Danevang, Texas	705.1 pounds (319.8 kg)	477.6 pounds (216.6 kg) (@month 10)	227.5 pounds (103.2 kg)	
4	Syreeta Covington	31 years old	Columbus, Ohio	603.0 pounds (273.5 kg)	506 pounds (230 kg)	97 pounds (44 kg)	
5	Mark Rutland	42 years old	Orlando, Florida	715.2 pounds (324.4 kg)	578.0 pounds (262.2 kg) (@month 11)	137.2 pounds (62.2 kg)	
6	Stephanie Smith	36 years old	Anacortes, Washington	611.2 pounds (277.2 kg)	596.4 pounds (270.5 kg) (@month 8)	14.8 pounds (6.7 kg)	
7	Chris Parsons	36 years old	Oklahoma City, Oklahoma	620.1 pounds (281.3 kg)	364 pounds (165 kg)	256 pounds (116 kg)	
8	Patrick Macon	42 years old	Columbus, Georgia	656.9 pounds (298.0 kg)	531 pounds (241 kg)	126 pounds (57 kg)	Deceased, aged 46

=== Season 12 (2024) ===
No. overall	No. in season	Title	Original release date	U.S. viewers (millions)
139	1	"Krystal S's Journey"	March 6, 2024	N/A
140	2	"William's Journey"	March 13, 2024	N/A
141	3	"Delana's Journey"	March 20, 2024	N/A
142	4	"Abi's Journey"	March 27, 2024	N/A
143	5	"Rose's Journey"	April 3, 2024	N/A
144	6	"Shakyia's Journey"	April 10, 2024	N/A
145	7	"Charles' Journey"	April 17, 2024	N/A

Season 12 subjects
Episode	Patient name	Starting age	Location	Starting weight	Ending weight (12 mos.)	Total weight loss (12 mos. or from later peak weight (LPW))	Notes
1	Krystal Stoor	36 years old	Menan, Idaho	690.8 pounds (313.3 kg)	505 pounds (229 kg)	185 pounds (84 kg)	
2	William Keefer	34 years old	Round Rock, Texas	592.6 pounds (268.8 kg)(later 598.7 pounds (271.6 kg))	588.4 pounds (266.9 kg)	10.3 pounds (4.7 kg)	
3	Delana Boyer	43 years old	Greeneville, Tennessee	646 pounds (293 kg)(later 651 pounds (295 kg))	539 pounds (244 kg)	112 pounds (51 kg)	
4	Abi Ruiz	37 years old	Austin, Texas	728 pounds (330 kg)	403 pounds (183 kg)	325 pounds (147 kg)	
5	Rose Perrine	58 years old	Jonesboro, Arkansas	564.6 pounds (256.1 kg)	393.5 pounds (178.5 kg)	171.1 pounds (77.6 kg)	last weighing at month 10
6	Shakyia Jackson	26 years old	Charlotte, North Carolina	655.7 pounds (297.4 kg)	635.1 pounds (288.1 kg)	20.6 pounds (9.3 kg)	Took place over 1 year and 4 months
7	Charles Bridgeman	29/31 years old	Everett, Washington	677.8 pounds (307.4 kg)	604.9 pounds (274.4 kg)	72.9 pounds (33.1 kg)	last weighing at month 9

=== Season 13 (2025) ===
No. overall	No. in season	Title	Original release date	U.S. viewers (millions)
146	1	"Jonathan's Journey"	January 1, 2025	N/A
147	2	"Krystal A's Journey"	January 8, 2025	N/A
148	3	"Karen's Journey"	January 15, 2025	N/A
149	4	"Gary's Journey"	January 22, 2025	N/A
150	5	"Jacky's Journey"	January 29, 2025	N/A
151	6	"Deshaun's Journey"	February 5, 2025	N/A
152	7	"Juan's Journey"	February 12, 2025	N/A

Season 13 subjects
Episode	Patient name	Starting age	Location	Starting weight	Ending weight (12 mos.)	Total weight loss (12 mos. or from later peak weight (LPW))	Notes
1	Jonathan Colp	36 years old	Macedonia, Illinois	641.5 pounds (291.0 kg)	425 pounds (193 kg)	216 pounds (98 kg)	
2	Krystal Armintor	36 years old	Pasadena, Texas	592.6 pounds (268.8 kg)	387 pounds (176 kg)	205 pounds (93 kg)	
3	Karen Suffern	42 years old	Rocky Mount, North Carolina	604.0 pounds (274.0 kg)	552 pounds (250 kg)	52 pounds (24 kg)	First weight at 3.5 mos and last weight at 9 mos
4	Gary Hawkins	32 years old	Oakland, California	764.00 pounds (346.54 kg)	753.90 pounds (341.96 kg)	10.10 pounds (4.58 kg)	First weight at 5 mos and last weight at 10 mos
5	Jacky Rodgers	27 years old	Linden, Texas	709.8 pounds (322.0 kg)	556 pounds (252 kg)	153 pounds (69 kg)	
6	Deshaun Davis	28 years old	Omaha, Nebraska	???	???	???	No weight was recorded
7	Juan Adams	47 years old	Metarie, Louisiana	627.2 pounds (284.5 kg)	505.0 pounds (229.1 kg)	122.2 pounds (55.4 kg)	Last weight at 9 mos

== Where Are They Now? ==
No. overall	No. in season	Title	Original release date
1	S1E1	"Zsalynn and Christina"	January 7, 2015
2	S1E2	"Olivia and James"	January 14, 2015
3	S1E3	"Penny and Tara"	January 21, 2015
4	S1E4	"Chuck and Paula"	January 28, 2015
5	S2E1	"Melissa and Ashley"	March 30, 2016
6	S2E2	"Christina and Paula"	April 6, 2016
7	S2E3	"Zsalynn and Olivia"	April 13, 2016
8	S2E4	"Bettie Jo and Susan"	April 20, 2016
9	S2E5	"Joe"	April 27, 2016
10	S2E6	"Angel and Charity"	May 4, 2016
11	S2E7	"Laura and Marla"	May 11, 2016
12	S2E8	"Chay and Pauline"	May 18, 2016
13	S3E1	"Lupe and Ashley D."	April 12, 2017
14	S3E2	"Brittani and Sean"	April 19, 2017
15	S3E3	"Teretha and Chad"	April 26, 2017
16	S3E4	"Nikki"	May 3, 2017
17	S3E5	"Dottie and June"	May 10, 2017
18	S3E6	"Milla and Charity Part 1"	May 17, 2017
19	S3E7	"Joe W. and Pauline"	May 24, 2017
20	S3E8	"Laura and Chay"	May 31, 2017
21	S4E1	"Steven and Justin Assanti Part 3"	January 3, 2018
22	S4E2	"Bettie Jo and Susan"	April 18, 2018
23	S4E3	"Melissa Morris"	April 25, 2018
24	S4E4	"Kandi and Brandi"	May 23, 2018
25	S4E5	"Erica"	May 30, 2018
26	S4E6	"Diana and Ashley R."	June 6, 2018
27	S4E7	"Kirsten, Michael, and Roni"	June 13, 2018
28	S4E8	"James and Cynthia"	June 20, 2018
29	S4E9	"Doug"	June 27, 2018
30	S4E10	"Nicole and Ashley D."	July 11, 2018
31	S4E11	"Lupe and Brittani"	July 18, 2018
32	S4E12	"Sean and Dottie"	July 25, 2018
33	S4E13	"Milla and Charity Part 2"	March 27, 2019
34	S5E1	"Steven and Justin Assanti Part 4"	May 22, 2019
35	S5E2	"Janine"	May 29, 2019
36	S5E3	"Lee & Rena & Sarah"	June 5, 2019
37	S5E4	"Sean"	June 12, 2019
38	S5E5	"Jennifer & Marissa & Liz"	June 19, 2019
39	S5E6	"Milla"	June 26, 2019
40	S5E7	"June, Chad, & Pauline"	July 3, 2019
41	S5E8	"Tamy & Karina"	December 18, 2019
42	S6E1	"David, Benji, & Erica"	April 22, 2020
43	S6E2	"Alicia & Pauline"	April 29, 2020
44	S6E3	"Dottie & Cynthia"	May 6, 2020
45	S6E4	"Charity, Charly & Teretha"	May 13, 2020
46	S6E5	"The One-Ton Family"	May 20, 2020
47	S6E6	"Steven and Justin Assanti The Final Chapter"	May 27, 2020
48	S7E1	"Maja and Justin"	March 31, 2021
49	S7E2	"Brianne and Annjeanette"	April 7, 2021
50	S7E3	"Angie J. Part 1"	April 14, 2021
51	S7E4	"Angie J. Part 2"	April 21, 2021
52	S7E5	"Jeanne and Brandon"	April 28, 2021
53	S7E6	"Cillas and Tiffany"	May 5, 2021
54	S8E1	"John and Lonnie"	December 14, 2022
55	S8E2	"Holly and Lashanta"	December 21, 2022
56	S8E3	"Robin and Garrett"	January 4, 2023
57	S8E4	"Vianey and Allen"	January 11, 2023
58	S8E5	"Octavia and Aaron"	January 18, 2023
59	S8E6	"Lacey and Mercedes"	January 25, 2023
60	S9E1	"Nathan and Amber"	May 1, 2024
61	S9E2	"Ontreon and Wess"	May 8, 2024
62	S9E3	"Julian and Cindy"	May 15, 2024
63	S9E4	"David and Syreeta"	May 22, 2024
64	S9E5	"Margaret and Megan"	May 29, 2024
65	S9E6	"Seana and J.T."	June 5, 2024
66	S10E1	"Carlton and Shantel"	February 19, 2025
67	S10E2	"Thederick and Lindsey"	February 26, 2025
68	S10E3	"Paul and Carrie"	March 26, 2025
69	S10E4	"Mike and Chrystal"	April 2, 2025
70	S10E5	"Isaac and Irene"	April 9, 2025
71	S10E6	"Michael and Lucas"	April 16, 2025
