= Jeremy Boyer =

American stadium organist (born 1980)

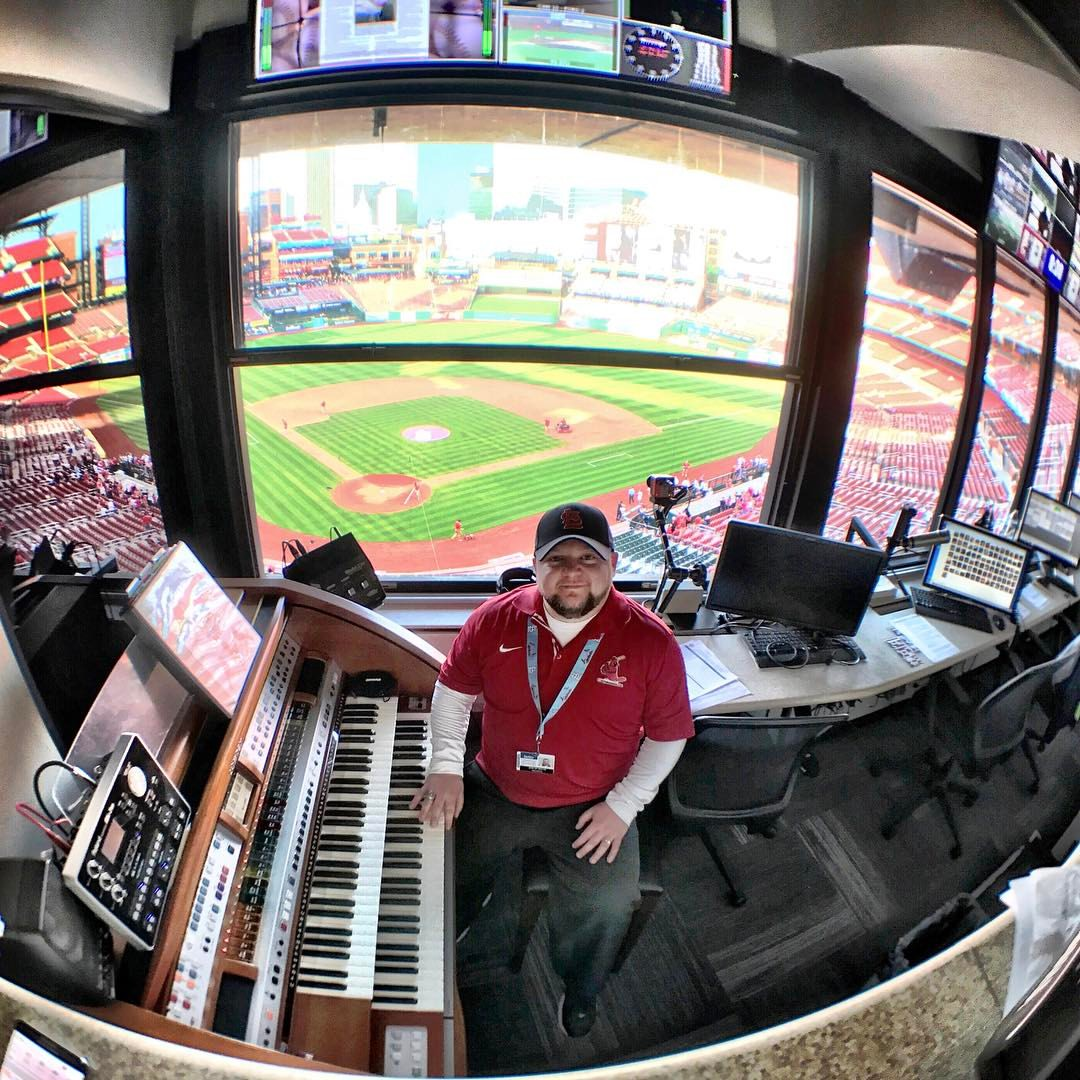
- Boyer in 2017
- Born: May 12, 1980 (age 45); Potosi, Missouri, US
- Occupation: Organist • Church music director
- Organization(s): St. Louis Blues, NHL St. Louis Cardinals, MLB

Jeremy A. Boyer (born May 12, 1980) is an American musician best known for being the stadium organist for the National Hockey League's St. Louis Blues and the Major League Baseball's St. Louis Cardinals.

== Early life ==
Boyer was born and raised in Potosi, Missouri. He was a self-taught organist as a young man and then studied under St. Louis organist Ernie Hays. Boyer is a 1998 graduate of Potosi High School and an inaugural member of the Potosi Trojans Hall of Fame. He attended Mineral Area College from 1998-2000.

He first played for sports teams when he was a student at Southeast Missouri State University, playing for their baseball team's games. He participated in the Southeast Show Band while in college and attributes that experience with helping him learn "what kinds of music got the crowd going." When he graduated in 2004 with a Bachelor of Music Education, his first musician jobs were working as an organist and music director at local schools and churches. He has three daughters.

== Career ==
Boyer's first professional stadium organist job was working for the Memphis Redbirds. A person from the St. Louis Blues organization saw a video of his work and offered him a tryout. He performed “Come On Eileen” by Dexy's Midnight Runners and “Holiday” by Green Day. His first Blues game was on January 19, 2008.

Boyer had worked in Busch Stadium for the Cardinals since 2011; he wears a Cardinals 2013 National League championship team ring. He plays occasional Retro Nights for the Kansas City Royals, who otherwise do not have a live organist; and he has played for the St. Louis Ambush in the Major Indoor Soccer League.

The Blues were in last place in the NHL at the beginning of 2019. During their comeback in this season, the song “Gloria” by Laura Branigan became associated with them doing well. Boyer recorded the song for the team and put it on YouTube for them to hear during the playoffs and regularly played it for every team win, calling it part of his "victory playlist," retiring it after the Blues won the Stanley Cup. He played for the St. Louis Blues’ 2019 Stanley Cup Championship, the first Stanley Cup in franchise history.

Boyer played the organ during "watch parties" held at Enterprise Center during the 2019 playoff season, and regularly plays at watch parties at Ballpark Village in St. Louis when the team is on the road. He is active on social media with his cover songs played on this organ. A video he posted to TikTok of him playing Rage Against the Machine's "Killing in the Name" during a game received over two million views.

During the COVID-19 pandemic, the Blues played in the Western Conference quarterfinals against the Vancouver Canucks at Rogers Place in Edmonton because of the NHL's "bubble plan." Boyer worked with the team's management pre-recording music that could be played to give the game a "home feel" from a distance. Boyer said, "I put it in a Dropbox and sent it to the Blues and they shared it with the NHL.... it's cool to be 1,500 miles [2,400 km] away and seeing yourself playing in Edmonton on the big screen." He is the second-longest tenured organist in the St. Louis Blues franchise history, behind his teacher Ernie Hays. He played for the 2017 NHL Winter Classic at Busch Stadium and the 2020 NHL All-Star Game at Enterprise Center.

Boyer feels his music is also a form of prayer and a way of getting closer to God, saying, "At times, we can get stuck in ruts and go through the motions in praying, saying the same prayers over and over. Through music, you can pick a different piece or song and it gives you a chance to really express yourself in a different way or keep you focused in a different way." In addition to his stadium organist work, Boyer is also music director for St. Francis of Assisi Catholic Church in Oakville, Missouri. When Pope John Paul II visited to St. Louis in 1999, Boyer was selected to sing for him.
