= Wayne Crump =

American politician

Member of the Missouri House of Representatives from the 152nd district
- In office 1983–2001

Personal details
- Born: June 26, 1949 or 1950 Belleville, Illinois
- Party: Democratic

Wayne Crump (born June 26, 1949 or 1950) is an American Democratic politician who served in the Missouri House of Representatives at times as Majority Floor Leader and Assistant Majority Floor Leader.

== Biography ==
Born in Belleville, Illinois, Crump attended Mascoutah High School and Belleville Area College. He has worked as a cattle ranch and a deputy sheriff in Washington County, Missouri. He has resided near Potosi, Missouri.
