= Younan Nowzaradan =

Iranian-American surgeon, television personality, and author (born 1944)

- یونان نوزرادان
- Born: October 11, 1944 (age 82); Tehran, Iran
- Other name: Dr. Now
- Education: University of Tehran (MD)
- Occupations: Surgeon; TV personality; author
- Known for: Appearances on My 600-lb Life & The 6000 lb Diaries with Dr. Now
- Spouse: Delores McRedmond (m. 1975; div. 2004)
- Children: 3

Younan Nowzaradan (Pronounced Navzaradan; Persian: یونان نوزرادان; born October 11, 1944), also known professionally as Dr. Now, is an Iranian-born American doctor, TV personality, and author. He specializes in vascular surgery and bariatric surgery. He is best known for helping morbidly obese people lose weight on the former TLC reality television series My 600-lb Life (2012–2025) and The 6000 lb Diaries with Dr. Now (2025).

== Education and medical career ==
Nowzaradan was born and raised in Tehran, Iran to ethnic Assyrian parents. In 1970, he graduated from the University of Tehran with a Doctor of Medicine degree. He then moved to the United States. He participated in the Medical Orientation Program at Saint Louis University in 1971 and completed a Rotating Surgical Internship at St. John Hospital (operated by St. John Providence Health System) in Detroit. Nowzaradan is currently affiliated with Houston Obesity Surgery in Houston, and practices at several local hospitals. He is the author of several scholarly publications on obesity and laparoscopy.

== Media appearances ==
Nowzaradan has been on My 600-lb Life since 2012 and The 6000 lb Diaries with Dr. Now since 2025. He has also appeared on installments of Body Shock, including the episodes "Half Ton Dad", "Half Ton Teen", and "Half Ton Mum". He also published two books titled Last Chance to Live (2017) and The Scale Does Not Lie, People Do (2019).

== Personal life ==
Nowzaradan married Delores McRedmond in 1975. The couple had three children together. Delores petitioned for divorce in 2002, and the divorce was finalized in 2004. His son, Jonathan Nowzaradan (b. 1978), works as a director and producer for My 600-lb Life.

== Publications ==
=== Books ===
- Nowzaradan, Younan. Last Chance to Live. Younan Nowzaradan. ISBN 978-0-9972252-0-4.
- Nowzaradan, Younan (2019). The Scale Does Not Lie, People Do: Reversing Obesity Now : Dr. Nowzaradan Takes a Closer Look at Obesity and the Essential Solutions for the 21st Century. Younan Nowzaradan M.D. ISBN 978-0-9972252-1-1.

=== Articles ===
- Castillo Silva, Ana Karen; Nowzaradan, Younan; Varon, Joseph (March 27, 2018). "Editorial: The Malignant Obesity Hypoventilation Syndrome (MOHS): An Unrecognized Critical Care Syndrome?". Current Respiratory Medicine Reviews. 13 (3): 124–125. doi:10.2174/1573398X1303180327163522.
- Muñoz, Sebastian; Nowzaradan, Younan; Varon, Joseph (March 2013). "Extreme Obesity in the Intensive Care Unit: The Malignant Obesity Hypoventilation Syndrome". Journal of Intensive Care Medicine. 28 (2): 134–135. doi:10.1177/1559827612445707. PMID 22781965. S2CID 44438360.
- Nowzaradan, Younan; Barnes, J. Peyton Jr (December 1993). "Current Techniques in Laparoscopic Appendectomy". Surgical Laparoscopy Endoscopy & Percutaneous Techniques. 3 (6): 470–476. PMID 8269267.
- Nowzaradan, Younan; Barnes, J. Peyton Jr; Westmoreland, Jack; Hojabri, Mohsen (October 1993). "Laparoscopic Appendectomy: Treatment of Choice for Suspected Appendicitis". Surgical Laparoscopy Endoscopy & Percutaneous Techniques. 3 (5): 411–416. PMID 8261273.
- Meador, John H.; Nowzaradan, Younan; Matzelle, Wayne (February 1991). "Laparoscopic Cholecystectomy: Report of 82 Cases". Southern Medical Journal. 84 (2): 186–189. doi:10.1097/00007611-199102000-00008. PMID 1824963.
