= Fourche a Renault, Missouri =

Fourche a Renault
- Location within Missouri
- Coordinates: 38.0133814°N 90.8776333°W
- Country: United States
- State: Missouri
- County: Washington County
- Post office established: 1831
- Post office ceased operation: 1905
- Named after: Fourche a Renault (stream of the same name)

Fourche a Renault is an extinct town in Washington County, in the U.S. state of Missouri.

A post office was established at Fourche a Renault in 1831, and remained in operation until 1905. The community took its name from the nearby creek of the same name.
