= Harrison Queen House =

Historic house in Missouri, United States

- U.S. National Register of Historic Places
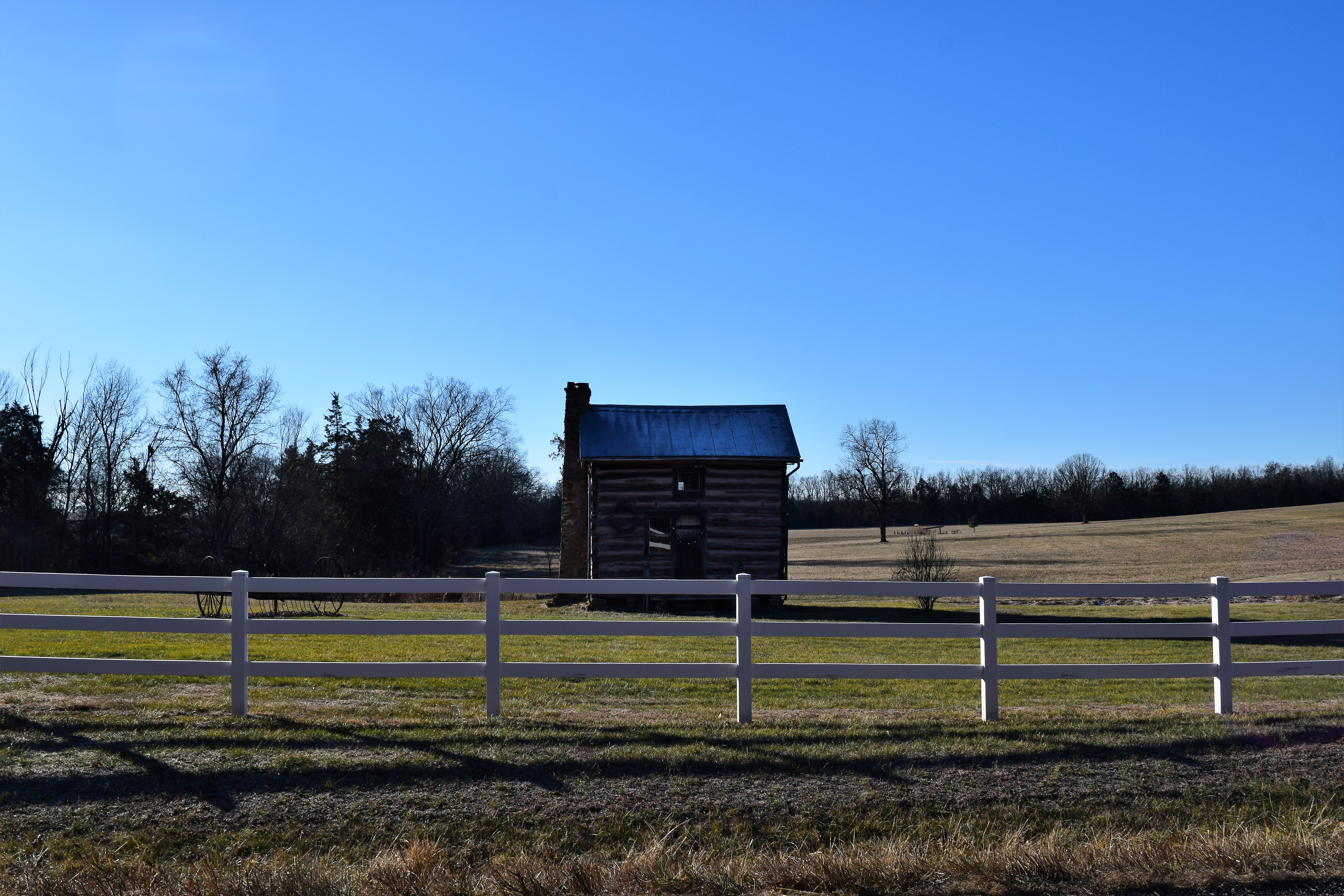

- Location within Missouri Location within the United States
- Nearest city: Caledonia, Missouri
- Coordinates: 37°46′48″N 90°47′55″W
- Area: less than one acre
- Built: c. 1875
- Built by: Harrison Queen
- Architectural style: Single-pen log house
- NRHP reference No.: 02000700
- Added to NRHP: June 27, 2002

Harrison Queen House is a historic home located near Caledonia, Missouri. It was built about 1875, and is a 1 1/2-story, single-pen log house, measuring 16 by 18 feet (4.9 by 5.5 m). It features an exterior limestone chimney.

It was listed on the National Register of Historic Places in 2002.
