= Caledonia, Missouri =

- Village
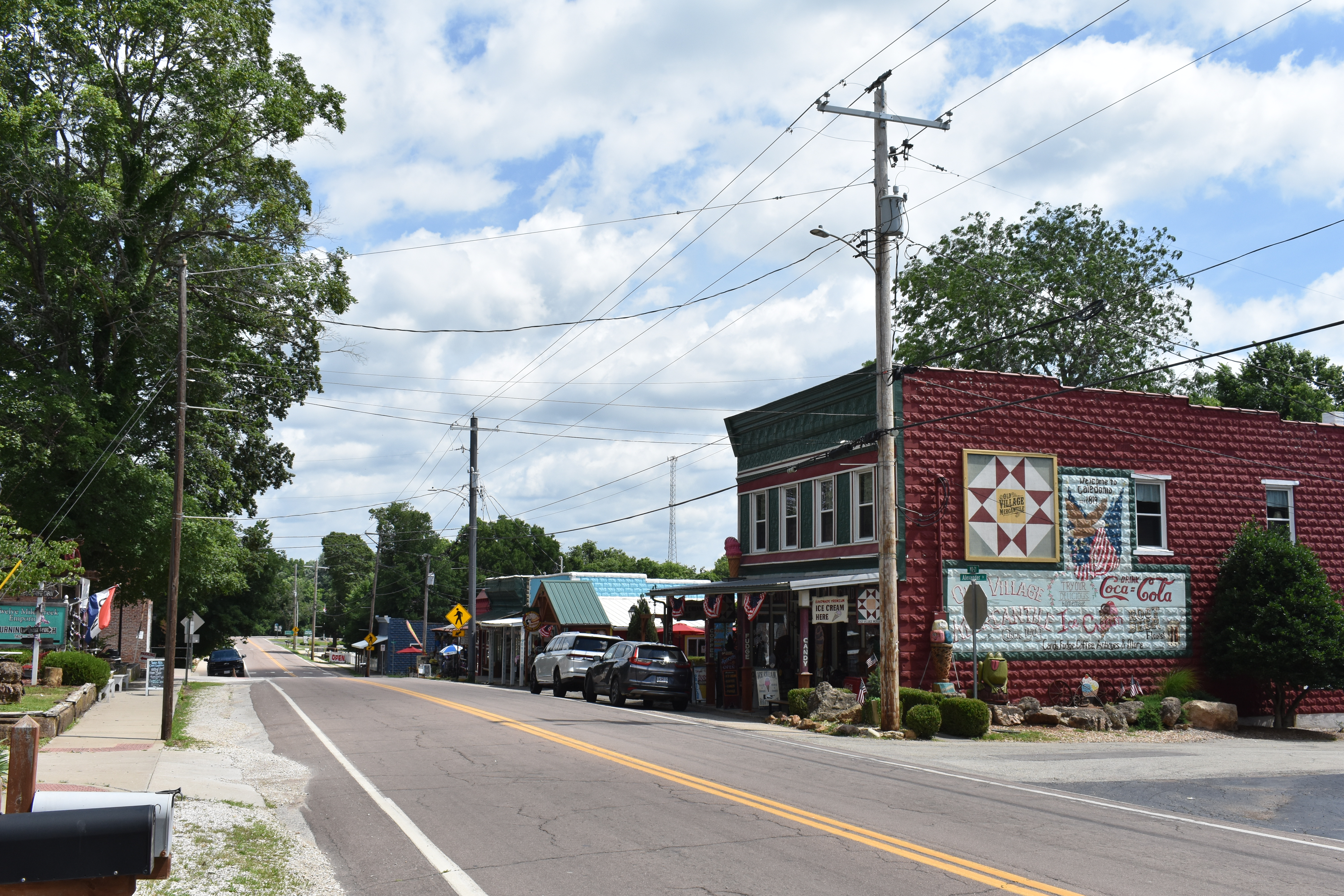
- Caledonia in June 2026
- Nickname: Caley
- Location of Caledonia, Missouri
- Coordinates: 37°45′53″N 90°46′20″W
- Country: United States
- State: Missouri
- County: Washington
- Incorporated: 1819

Area
  - Total: 0.16 sq mi (0.42 km^{2})
  - Land: 0.16 sq mi (0.42 km^{2})
  - Water: 0 sq mi (0.00 km^{2})
- Elevation: 902 ft (275 m)

Population (2020)
  - Total: 131
  - Density: 799.6/sq mi (308.71/km^{2})
- Time zone: UTC-6 (Central (CST))
  - Summer (DST): UTC-5 (CDT)
- ZIP code: 63631
- Area code: 573
- FIPS code: 29-10432
- GNIS feature ID: 2397530
- Website: www.caledoniamo.org

Caledonia is a village in southern Washington County, Missouri, United States. The population was 131 at the 2020 census. Caledonia is located 4 miles (6.4 km) east of Belgrade.

== History ==
Caledonia was laid out in 1819. The village is named after the Roman Empire's Latin name for Scotland. A post office has been in operation at Caledonia since 1819.

The Caledonia Historic District, Land Archeological Site, Lost Creek Pictograph Archeological Site, and Harrison Queen House are listed on the National Register of Historic Places.

== Geography ==
Caledonia is located at the intersection of Missouri Route 32 and Missouri Route 21. Goose Creek flows through the community and Spring Glen Lake is approximately one mile to the northeast along Goose Creek.

According to the United States Census Bureau, the village has a total area of 0.16 square miles (0.41 km^{2}), all land.

== Demographics ==
Historical population
Census	Pop.	Note	%±
1880	236		—
1900	166		—
1910	128		−22.9%
1920	133		3.9%
1930	143		7.5%
1940	139		−2.8%
1950	143		2.9%
1960	119		−16.8%
1970	113		−5.0%
1980	162		43.4%
1990	142		−12.3%
2000	158		11.3%
2010	130		−17.7%
2020	131		0.8%
U.S. Decennial Census

=== 2010 census ===
As of the census of 2010, there were 130 people, 58 households, and 39 families living in the village. The population density was 812.5 inhabitants per square mile (313.7/km^{2}). There were 76 housing units at an average density of 475.0 per square mile (183.4/km^{2}). The racial makeup of the village was 100.0% White. Hispanic or Latino of any race were 0.8% of the population.

There were 58 households, of which 25.9% had children under the age of 18 living with them, 55.2% were married couples living together, 3.4% had a female householder with no husband present, 8.6% had a male householder with no wife present, and 32.8% were non-families. 31.0% of all households were made up of individuals, and 17.2% had someone living alone who was 65 years of age or older. The average household size was 2.24 and the average family size was 2.72.

The median age in the village was 46 years. 17.7% of residents were under the age of 18; 6.1% were between the ages of 18 and 24; 24.6% were from 25 to 44; 30% were from 45 to 64; and 21.5% were 65 years of age or older. The gender makeup of the village was 53.1% male and 46.9% female.

=== 2000 census ===
As of the census of 2000, there were 158 people, 66 households, and 40 families living in the village. The population density was 1,133.9 inhabitants per square mile (437.8/km^{2}). There were 79 housing units at an average density of 567.0 per square mile (218.9/km^{2}). The racial makeup of the village was 100.00% White.

There were 66 households, out of which 31.8% had children under the age of 18 living with them, 50.0% were married couples living together, 12.1% had a female householder with no husband present, and 37.9% were non-families. 30.3% of all households were made up of individuals, and 16.7% had someone living alone who was 65 years of age or older. The average household size was 2.39 and the average family size was 3.00.

In the village, the population was spread out, with 25.3% under the age of 18, 13.9% from 18 to 24, 27.2% from 25 to 44, 20.3% from 45 to 64, and 13.3% who were 65 years of age or older. The median age was 29 years. For every 100 females, there were 100.0 males. For every 100 females age 18 and over, there were 87.3 males.

The median income for a household in the village was $24,833, and the median income for a family was $28,125. Males had a median income of $20,179 versus $15,625 for females. The per capita income for the village was $10,685. About 19.1% of families and 29.3% of the population were below the poverty line, including 40.0% of those under the age of 18 and 6.7% of those 65 or over.

== Schools ==
Valley R-VI is the local school, whose mascot is the Viking. There are two sets of buildings for the elementary (K-6) and the junior high & high school (7-12). The elementary buildings have a distinctive dome shape. The reason for the unconventional structures are because of their ability to withstand severe weather. “They are tornado proof – hurricane proof – fire proof and so our kids are very safe,“ stated Brad Crocker, who was Valley's superintendent at the time.

== Nearest airport ==
Washington County Airport, Airport Road, Mineral Point, Missouri 63660
