= Shirley, Missouri =

Unincorporated community in Missouri, U.S.

Coordinates: 37°54′54″N 90°55′09″W

Shirley is an unincorporated community in Washington County, in the U.S. state of Missouri.

The community is on Missouri Route 8 approximately six miles west of Potosi. Allen Branch flows through the community and enters the Sunnen Reservoir one mile to the north.

== History ==
A post office called Shirley was established in 1894, and remained in operation until 1955. The community has the name of James Shirley, a local merchant.

Susan Cave (23WA190) was listed on the National Register of Historic Places in 1989.
