= Mineral Fork =

Stream in the American state of Missouri

Mineral Fork is a stream in Washington County, Missouri. It is a tributary of the Big River.

The source which is the confluence of the Mine a Breton Creek and the Fourche a Renault is located at 38°01′44″N 90°51′12″W and the confluence with Big River is at: 38°06′09″N 90°40′53″W.

Mineral Fork was so named on account of deposits of the lead ore minerals near its course.

== See also ==
- List of rivers of Missouri
