= My 600-lb Life =

American reality television series

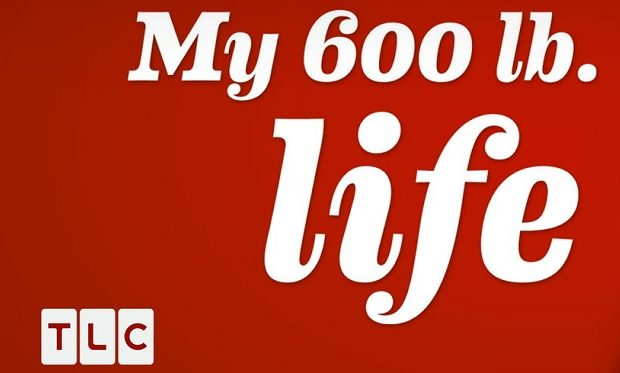
- Created by: Jonathan Nowzaradan
- Starring: Younan Nowzaradan, MD
- Composers: Britton Beisenherz, David Hamburger
- Country of origin: United States
- Original language: English
- No. of seasons: 13
- No. of episodes: 152 (list of episodes)

Production
- Executive producers: Jack Tarantino; Cameo Wallace; Ron Bowman; Jeff Keels; Graham Davidson; Tom Mireles; Jonathan Nowzaradan
- Producers: Leslie Appleyard; Amy Yerrington; Dawn Cooper Johnson
- Production locations: Houston, Texas
- Cinematography: Taylor Rudd
- Editors: Shrader Thomas; Jennifer Kovacs; Gareth Dawson; John Gehrke; Knox Hughes; Matt Waguespack
- Camera setup: Multi-camera
- Running time: 45 minutes (seasons 1–4, excluding advertisements); 85 minutes (season 5–13, excluding advertisements)
- Production company: Megalomedia

Original release
- Network: TLC
- Release: February 1, 2012 – February 12, 2025

My 600-lb Life is an American reality television series that has aired on the TLC television network from 2012 to 2025. Each episode follows a year in the life of morbidly obese individuals, who usually begin the episode weighing at least 600 pounds (270 kg), and documents their attempts to reduce their weight to a healthy level. Update episodes, called "Where Are They Now?", feature one or more previous patients, picking up a year or more after their original episodes aired.

Patients are placed under the care of Houston surgeon Younan Nowzaradan (often referred to as "Dr. Now"), who first has them attempt losing weight on their own by following a strict diet, and then depending on the patient's progress may offer gastric bypass surgery or sleeve gastrectomy to further assist in weight loss.

== Concept ==
This series was originally a five-part miniseries involving four morbidly obese patients. Because of its popularity, new episodes were filmed, including a "Where Are They Now?" retrospective in Season 4 that follows up on previous patients to track their weight-loss journey months or years after bariatric surgery.

In Season 1, patients were filmed over seven years (2004–2011). Beginning with Season 2, patients were filmed for only one year. In Season 8, certain patients' stories were filmed for only six months.

Beginning with Season 5, new episodes were two hours long instead of one hour. This was previously done with "Melissa's Story" (which was in two parts) and "Lupe's Story". Recap episodes titled "Supersized" and "Extended", which include additional facts and footage respectively, also aired during this season.

== Series overview ==
Season	Episodes	Originally released	
Season	Episodes	First released	Last released
1	6	February 1, 2012	March 26, 2012
2	8	January 7, 2014	February 25, 2014
3	10	January 7, 2015	April 8, 2015
4	12	January 6, 2016	May 18, 2016
5	14	January 4, 2017	April 16, 2017
6	16	January 3, 2018	May 9, 2018
7	20	January 2, 2019	May 15, 2019
8	16	January 1, 2020	April 15, 2020
9	13	December 30, 2020	March 24, 2021
10	15	November 3, 2021	February 9, 2022
11	8	February 1, 2023	March 22, 2023
12	7	March 6, 2024	April 17, 2024
13	7	January 1, 2025	February 12, 2025

== Subject outcomes ==
Twenty-five patients are known to have died since appearing on the show.

Patient name	Season	Episode	Age	Date	Cause	Sources	Notes
Henry Foots	1	4	54	May 16, 2013	Illness unrelated to weight		He suffered a medical episode one year prior to his death while working as a bus driver, killing a pedestrian.
Robert Buchel	6	8	41	November 15, 2017	Heart attack		Occurred during the filming of the show while staying in a skilled nursing facility in Houston
L.B. Bonner	6	6	30	August 2, 2018	Suicide by gunshot		
Lisa Fleming	6	7	50	August 23, 2018	Illness unrelated to weight		
Kelly Mason	7	13	41	February 15, 2019	Heart failure		Occurred during the filming of the show
Sean Milliken	4	11	29	February 17, 2019	Cardiac arrest due to infection complications from poor hygiene		Occurred during the filming of the WATN spin-off while staying in a physical rehabilitation center in Houston
James King	5	11	49	April 3, 2020	Multiple organ failure due to obesity		
Coliesa McMillian	8	12	41	September 22, 2020	Acute kidney failure and other complications related to weight loss surgery		
Renee Biran	6	11	56	May 14, 2021	Undisclosed		
Gina Krasley	8	5	30	August 1, 2021	Undisclosed		
Ashley Randall	1	5	40	October 2, 2021	Sepsis, complications related to sepsis, and pneumonia		
Laura Ann Perez	3	7	48	November 17, 2021	Undisclosed		
Destinee LaShaee	7	10	31	February 8, 2022	Implied to be suicide		Although the cause of death was not revealed, LaShaee and her family had stated she struggled with depression and suicidal ideation, according to her brother Wayne Compton, who stated "I'm sorry you felt like you had no other choice".
Angela Gutierrez	7	15	49	March 21, 2023	Undisclosed		
Larry Myers Jr.	10	13	49	June 13, 2023	Heart attack		
Paul MacNeill	10	6	37	September 21, 2023	Automobile accident		
Vianey Rodriguez	7	20	41	November 20, 2023	Pneumonia complications		
Latonya Pottain	11	2	40	May 17, 2025	Congestive heart failure		She was in a rehab center when it occurred.
Dottie Perkins	4	5	44	June 14, 2025	Unspecified long-term illness		
Lupe Samano	4	12	50	September 12, 2025	Undisclosed		
Patrick Macon	11	8	46	September 17, 2025	Cancer		
Pauline Potter	3	3	62	November 27, 2025	Complications from an automobile accident		
Charity Pierce	3	8	50	January 27, 2026	Undisclosed		She was in hospice care due to medical conditions that were ongoing at the time of her death.
Lee Sutton	6	1	51	January 29, 2026	Undisclosed		
Dolly Martinez	10	12	30	April 11, 2026	Congestive heart failure		

== Spin-offs ==
Beginning in January 2015, TLC began airing My 600-lb Life: Where Are They Now? The purpose of this spin-off was to update viewers on the weight loss journeys of people featured in previous seasons. As of 2024, nine seasons of the Where Are They Now? follow-ups have aired.

In 2016, a second spin-off, Skin Tight, began airing, showing people who struggle with the excess skin remaining after their weight loss successes. Dr. Nowzaradan appears along with other plastic surgeons.

== Lawsuits ==
In 2018, several news outlets reported that several former patients of Dr. Nowzaradan who appeared on the series, as well as the family of one patient, L.B. Bonner, who died by suicide, had brought suits against the show's production company, Megalomedia, alleging negligence and claiming that the company failed to cover medical costs. Plaintiff Destinee LaShaee, the first transgender participant to appear on the show, sued the show after claiming it did not provide the mental health treatments it promised. She died on February 8, 2022, after posting messages on social media "indicative of her depression and possibly suicidal thoughts."

A total of ten lawsuits were filed, which were later consolidated into a single proceeding on May 20, 2020. Megalomedia requested summary judgment, which was denied via the judge not ruling on its motion within the time required under Texas law. Megalomedia then appealed its motion to the appellate court.

On April 14, 2022, all ten of the lawsuits were dismissed by the 13th Appellate Court of Texas.
