= Washington County Courthouse (Missouri) =

- U.S. National Register of Historic Places
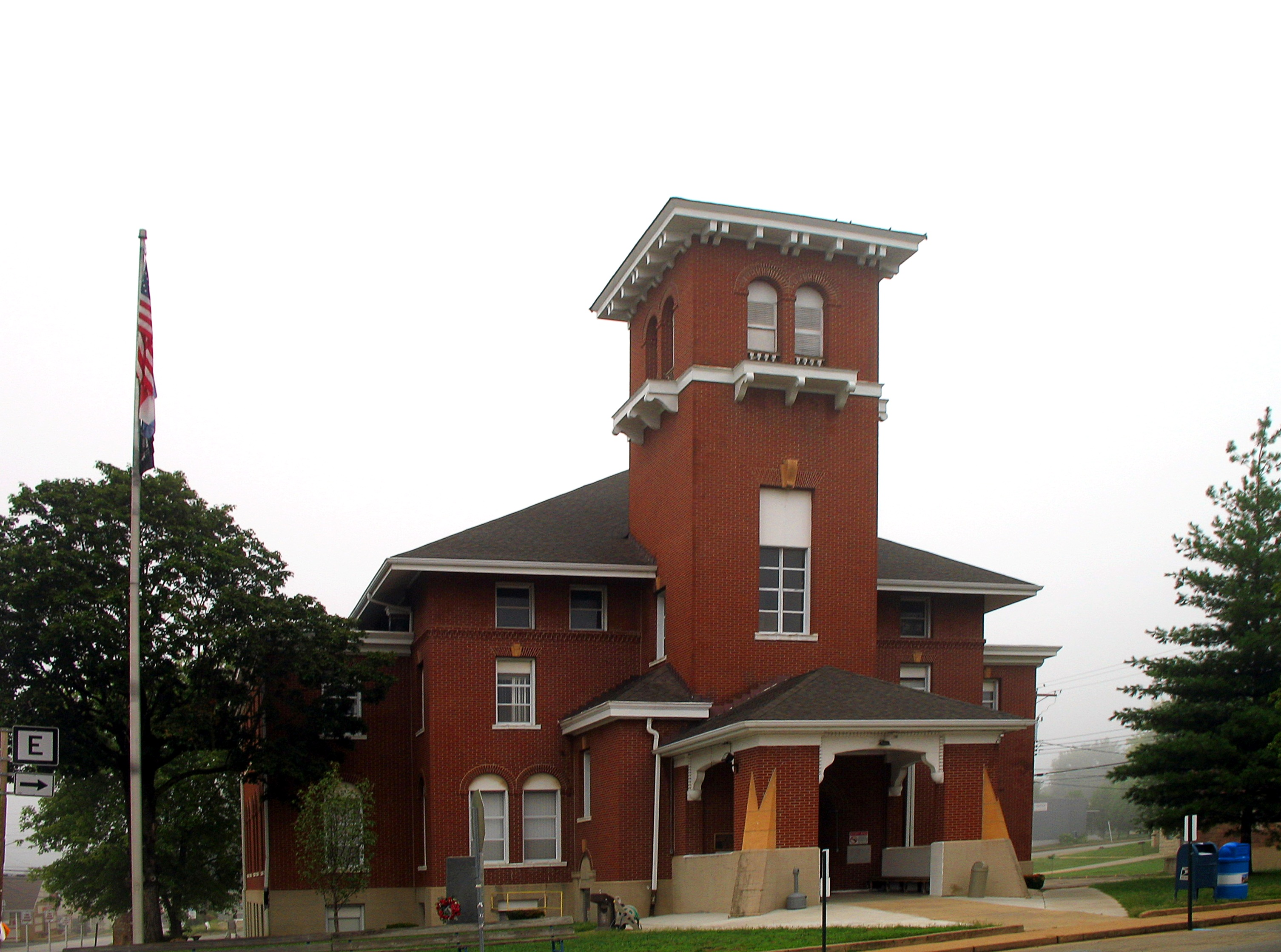
- Washington County Courthouse, September 2007

- Location within Missouri Location within the United States
- Interactive map showing the location of Washington County Courthouse
- Location: 102 N. Missouri St., Potosi, Missouri
- Coordinates: 37°56′12″N 90°47′17″W
- Area: Less than 1 acre (0.40 ha)
- Built: 1908
- Architect: Hohenschild, Henry H.; Oder, W. R.
- Architectural style: Italian Renaissance
- NRHP reference No.: 11000765
- Added to NRHP: October 25, 2011

Washington County Courthouse is a historic courthouse located at Potosi, Washington County, Missouri. It was built in 1908, and is a two-story, Renaissance Revival style brick building with a hipped roof. It features a projecting three-story entrance tower topped by a belfry.

It was listed on the National Register of Historic Places in 2011.
