= George Cresswell Furnace =

- U.S. National Register of Historic Places
- Location within Missouri Location within the United States
- Location: MO F, near Potosi, Missouri
- Coordinates: 38°2′27″N 90°50′20″W
- Area: less than one acre
- Built: c. 1840
- Architectural style: American Scotch hearth
- NRHP reference No.: 88000613
- Added to NRHP: May 23, 1988

George Cresswell Furnace, also known as the George Cresswell Furnace Stack, is a historic lead furnace located near Potosi, Washington County, Missouri. It was built about 1840, and is an open hearth furnace measuring about 100 feet square at its base and constructed of massive limestone blocks interlaced with mortar. The stack rises to a height of approximately 25 feet.

It was listed on the National Register of Historic Places in 1988.
