= Caledonia Historic District =

Historic district in Missouri, United States

- U.S. National Register of Historic Places
- U.S. Historic district
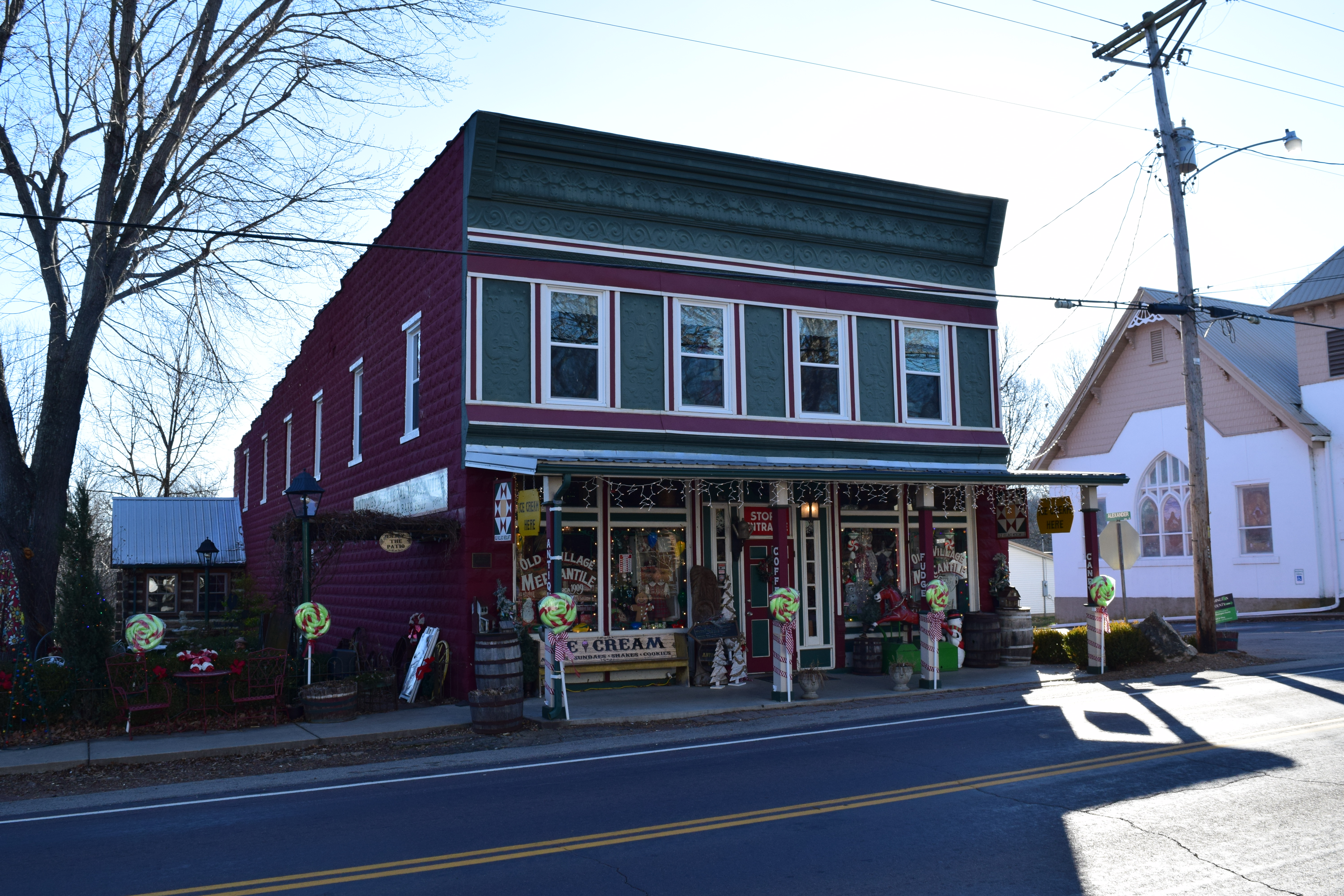
- McSpaden's Golden Rule Store

- Location within Missouri Location within the United States
- Location: Roughly bounded by Patrick, College, and Alexander Sts., and MO 21, Caledonia, Missouri
- Coordinates: 37°45′48″N 90°46′18″W
- Area: 26 acres (11 ha)
- Architectural style: Classical Revival, Greek Revival, I-house
- NRHP reference No.: 86003389
- Added to NRHP: October 27, 1986

Caledonia Historic District is a national historic district located at Caledonia, Washington County, Missouri. It encompasses 33 in the central business district and surrounding residential sections of Caledonia. It developed between about 1818 and 1936 and includes representative examples of Greek Revival and Neoclassical style architecture. Notable buildings include the Ruggles-Evans-Dent house (c. 1830), Conoco service station (c. 1930), Tyro Masonic Lodge (1919), Eversole House (1854), Post office (c. 1909), Benton Sinclair store (c. 1909), McSpaden's Golden Rule Store (c. 1909), Methodist Church (c. 1852), Presbyterian Church (1872), and Caledonia School (1936).

It was listed on the National Register of Historic Places in 1986.
