= Washington State Park =

State park in Missouri, United States

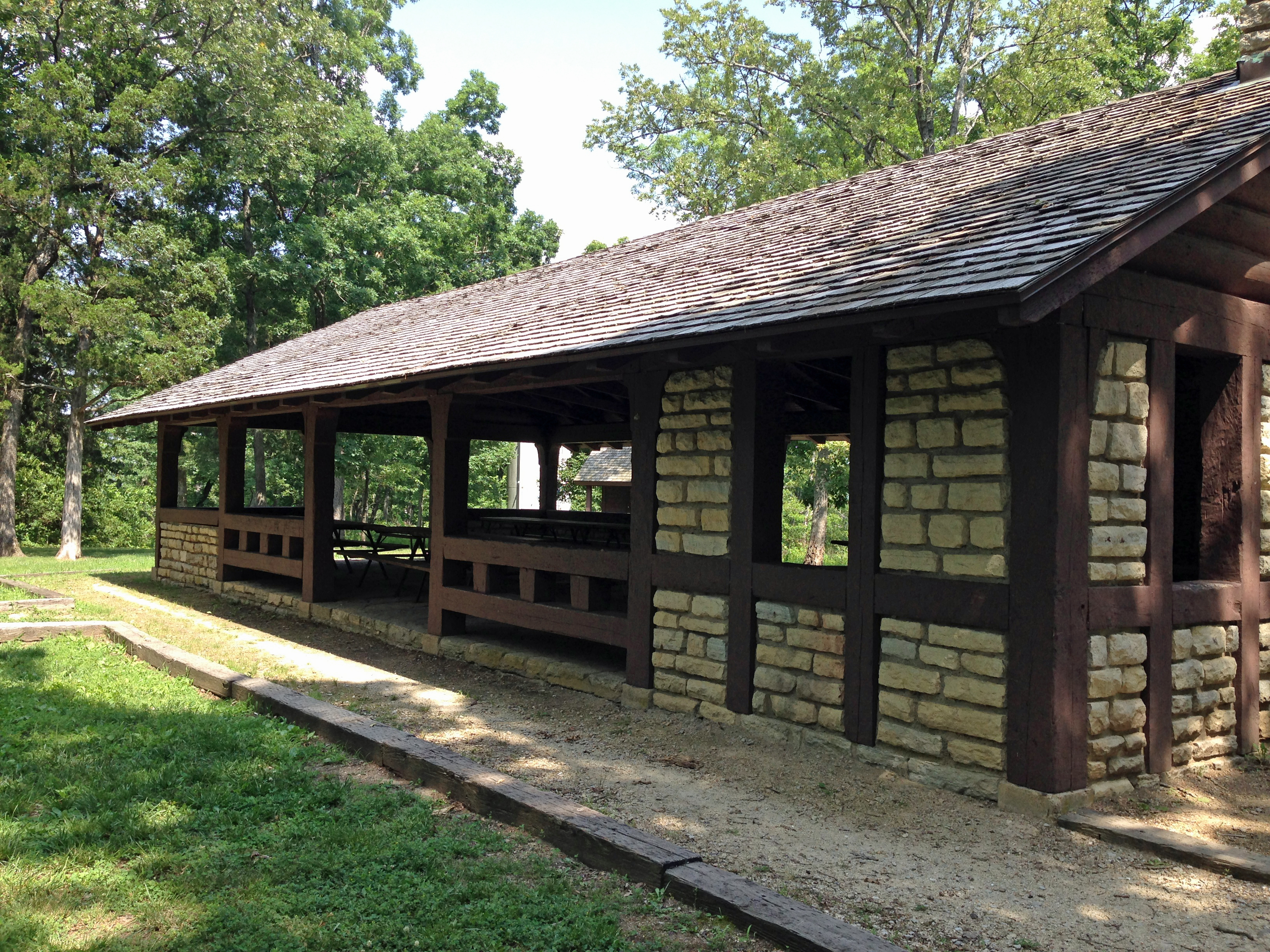
- Washington State Park CCC pavilion

- Location within Missouri Location within the United States
- Location: Washington County, Missouri, United States
- Coordinates: 38°05′02″N 90°40′27″W
- Area: 2,157.57 acres (873.14 ha)
- Elevation: 673 ft (205 m)
- Established: 1932
- Administrator: Missouri Department of Natural Resources
- Visitors: 306,387 (in 2023)
- Website: Official website
- Washington State Park Petroglyph Archeological Site
- U.S. National Register of Historic Places
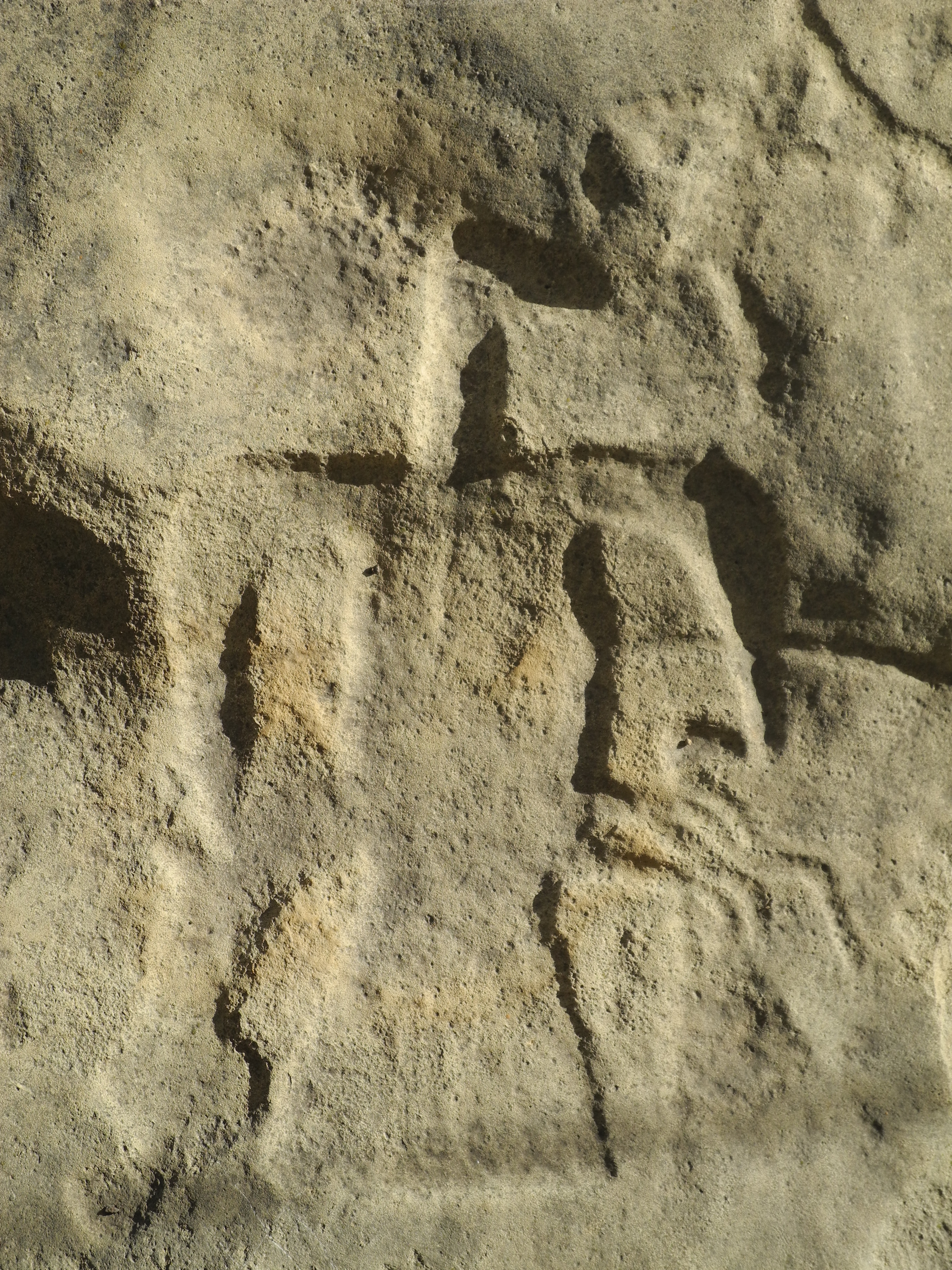
- An eagle petroglyph at Washington State Park
- Nearest city: Fertile, Missouri
- Area: 25 acres (10 ha)
- NRHP reference No.: 70000352
- Added to NRHP: April 3, 1970
- Washington State Park CCC Historic District
- U.S. National Register of Historic Places
- U.S. Historic district
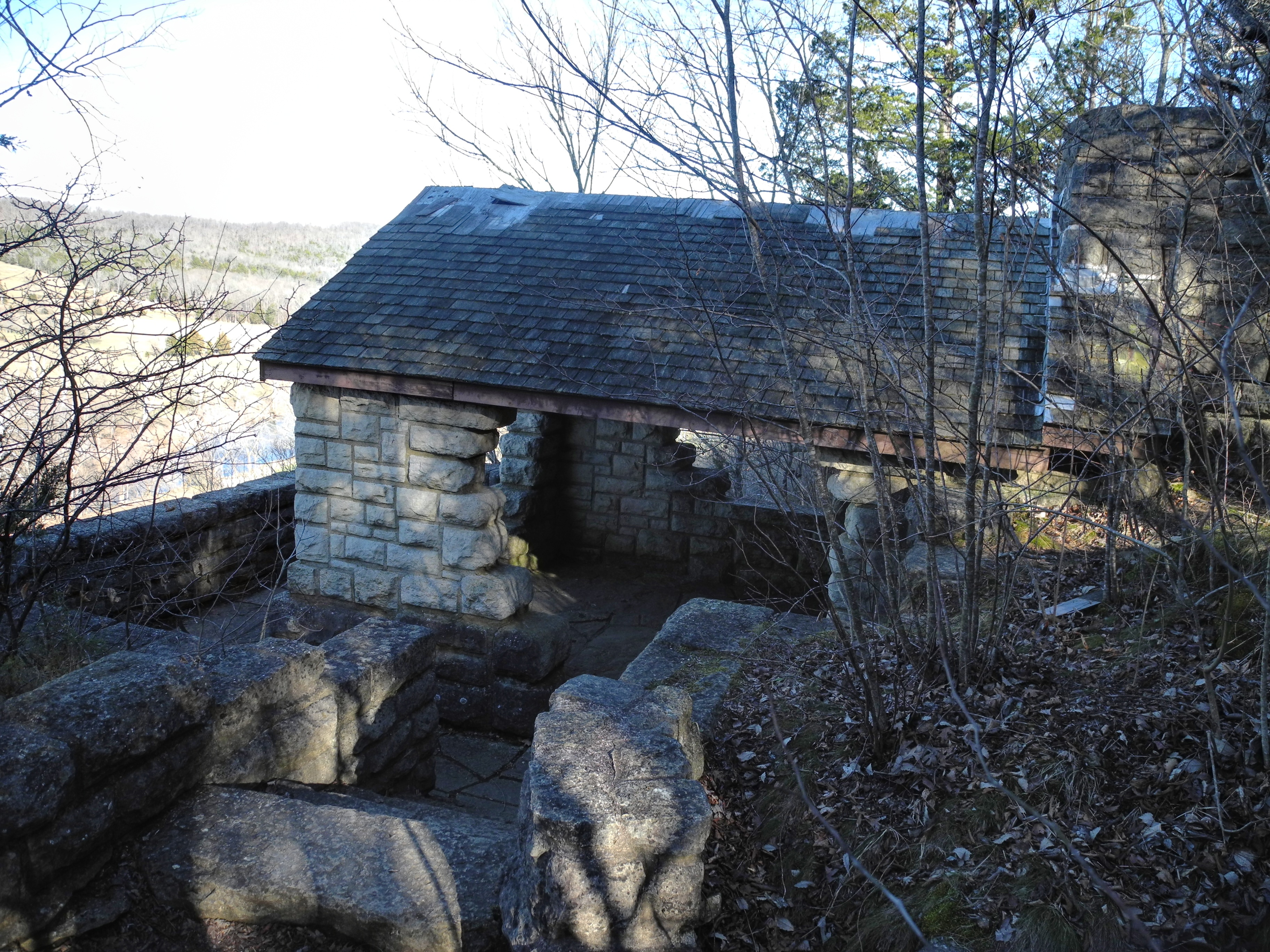
- Stone shelter built by the CCC
- Nearest city: Potosi, Missouri
- Area: 710 acres (290 ha)
- Built: 1934
- Built by: Civilian Conservation Corps
- Architectural style: Rustic
- MPS: ECW Architecture in Missouri State Parks 1933-1942 TR
- NRHP reference No.: 85000517
- Added to NRHP: March 4, 1985

Washington State Park is a public recreation area covering 2,157 acres (873 ha) in Washington County in the central eastern part of the state of Missouri. It is located on Highway 21 about 14 miles (23 km) northeast of Potosi or 7 miles (11 km) southwest of De Soto on the eastern edge of the Ozarks. The state park is noted for its Native American rock carvings and for its finely crafted stonework from the 1930s.

== Stone carvings ==
The carvings, or petroglyphs, carved in fixed dolomite rock, are believed to have been made around 1000 to 1600 CE and to give clues to the lives of the prehistoric Native Americans who once inhabited this part of Missouri. It is also believed that the park served as ceremonial grounds for these Middle Mississippi people who were related to the builders of the Cahokia Mounds in Illinois.

Most of the carvings are of birds, arrows, footprints, turkey tracks, human figures, and various geometric shapes and patterns. The three petroglyph sites in the park are thought to be all that is left of a more extensive site. They make up almost 75 percent of the known petroglyphs in Missouri and contain over 350 symbols.

The petroglyphs were listed on the National Register of Historic Places in 1970 as the Washington State Park Petroglyph Archeological Site.

== Stone structures ==
The park was built during the Great Depression of the 1930s by the African-American stonemasons of the Civilian Conservation Corps known as Company 1743. Their efforts left the park with the historical stone structures that still stand today: hiking shelters, picnic pavilions, and the stones that make up the 1,000 Steps Trail. Fourteen buildings and stone structures are included in the Washington State Park CCC Historic District, a national historic district listed on the National Register of Historic Places in 1985.

== Activities and amenities ==
Park activities include camping, fishing, canoeing, hiking, and swimming in both the Big River and an olympic-sized pool.
