= Fertile, Missouri =

Unincorporated community in Missouri, U.S.

Coordinates: 38°04′26″N 90°41′08″W

Fertile is an unincorporated community in Washington County, in the U.S. state of Missouri.

== History ==
A post office called Fertile was established in 1884, and remained in operation until 1928. The name "Fertile" is commendatory.

The Cresswell Petroglyph Archeological Site and Washington State Park Petroglyph Archeological Site are listed on the National Register of Historic Places.
