= Fourche a Renault =

Stream in the American state of Missouri

Location
- Country: United States
- State: Missouri
- County: Washington County

Physical characteristics
- Mouth
  - coordinates: 38°01′44″N 90°51′12″W

Fourche a Renault is a stream in Washington County in the U.S. state of Missouri. It is a tributary of Mineral Fork.

The stream emerges from the confluence of the Middle Fork Fourche a Renault and North Fork Fourche a Renault at 37°54′45″N 90°53′16″W and its confluence with Mine a Breton Creek to form Mineral Fork is at 38°01′44″N 90°51′12″W.

Fourche a Renault has the name of Philip Francois Renault, a pioneer citizen.

== See also ==
- Fourche a Renault, Missouri
- List of rivers of Missouri
