= Potosi, Missouri =

City in Missouri, U.S.

- City
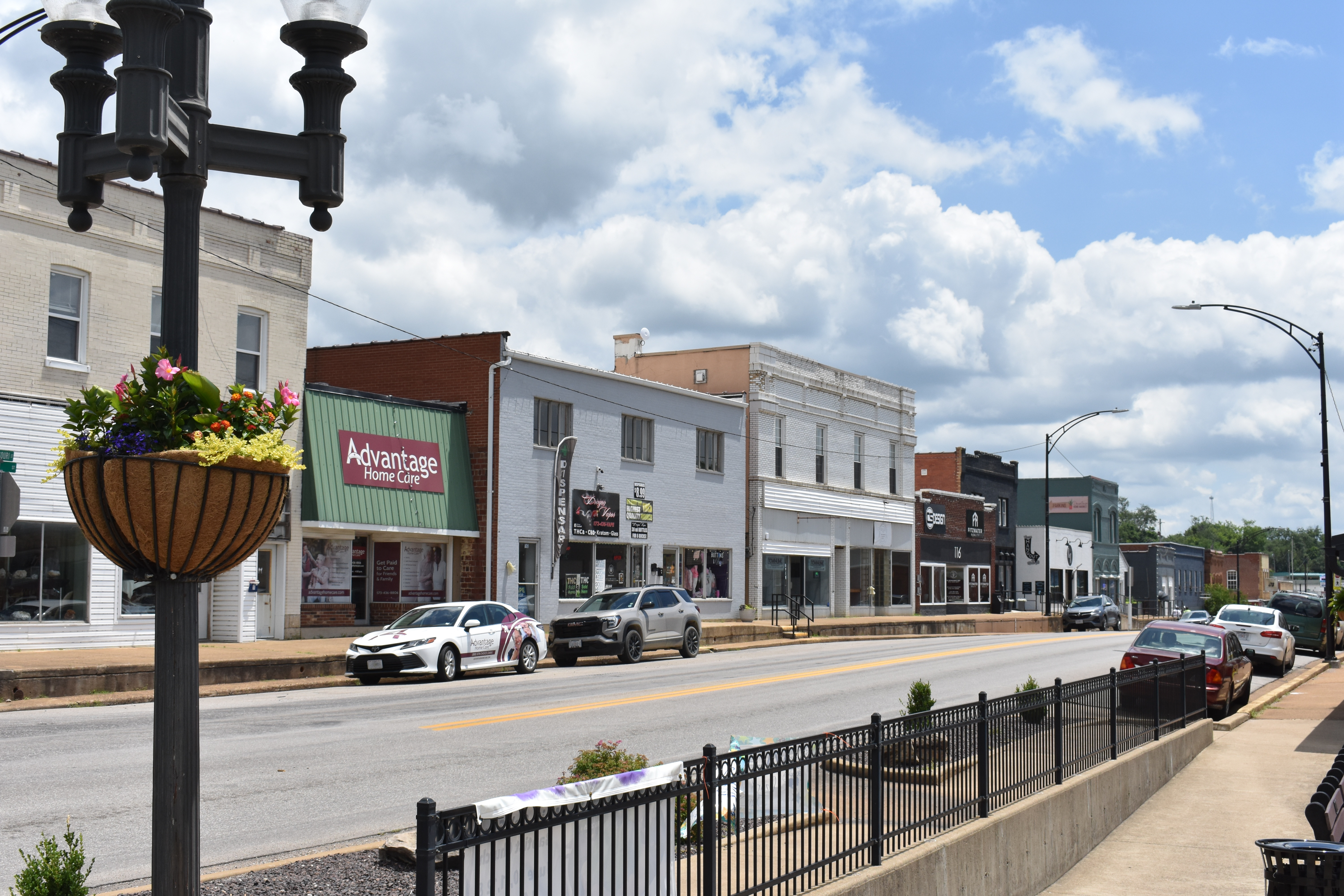
- Downtown
- Motto: A City for All Seasons
- Location of Potosi, Missouri
- Coordinates: 37°56′01″N 90°46′30″W
- Country: United States
- State: Missouri
- County: Washington
- Incorporated: 1826

Area
  - Total: 2.33 sq mi (6.03 km^{2})
  - Land: 2.33 sq mi (6.03 km^{2})
  - Water: 0 sq mi (0.00 km^{2})
- Elevation: 991 ft (302 m)

Population (2020)
  - Total: 2,538
  - Density: 1,090.0/sq mi (420.86/km^{2})
- Time zone: UTC−6 (Central (CST))
  - Summer (DST): UTC−5 (CDT)
- ZIP code: 63664
- Area code: 573
- FIPS code: 29-59330
- GNIS feature ID: 2396262
- Website: potosicity.com

Potosi (/pəˈtoʊsi/ pə-TOH-see) is a city and the county seat of Washington County, Missouri, United States. Potosi is 72 miles (116 km) southwest of St. Louis. The population was 2,538 as of the 2020 census.

Located in the Lead Belt, the city was founded in 1763 by French colonists as Mine à Breton or Mine au Breton. After the United States acquired this area, American Moses Austin renamed the community for the Bolivian silver-mining city of Potosí. He was involved in lead mining.

== History ==
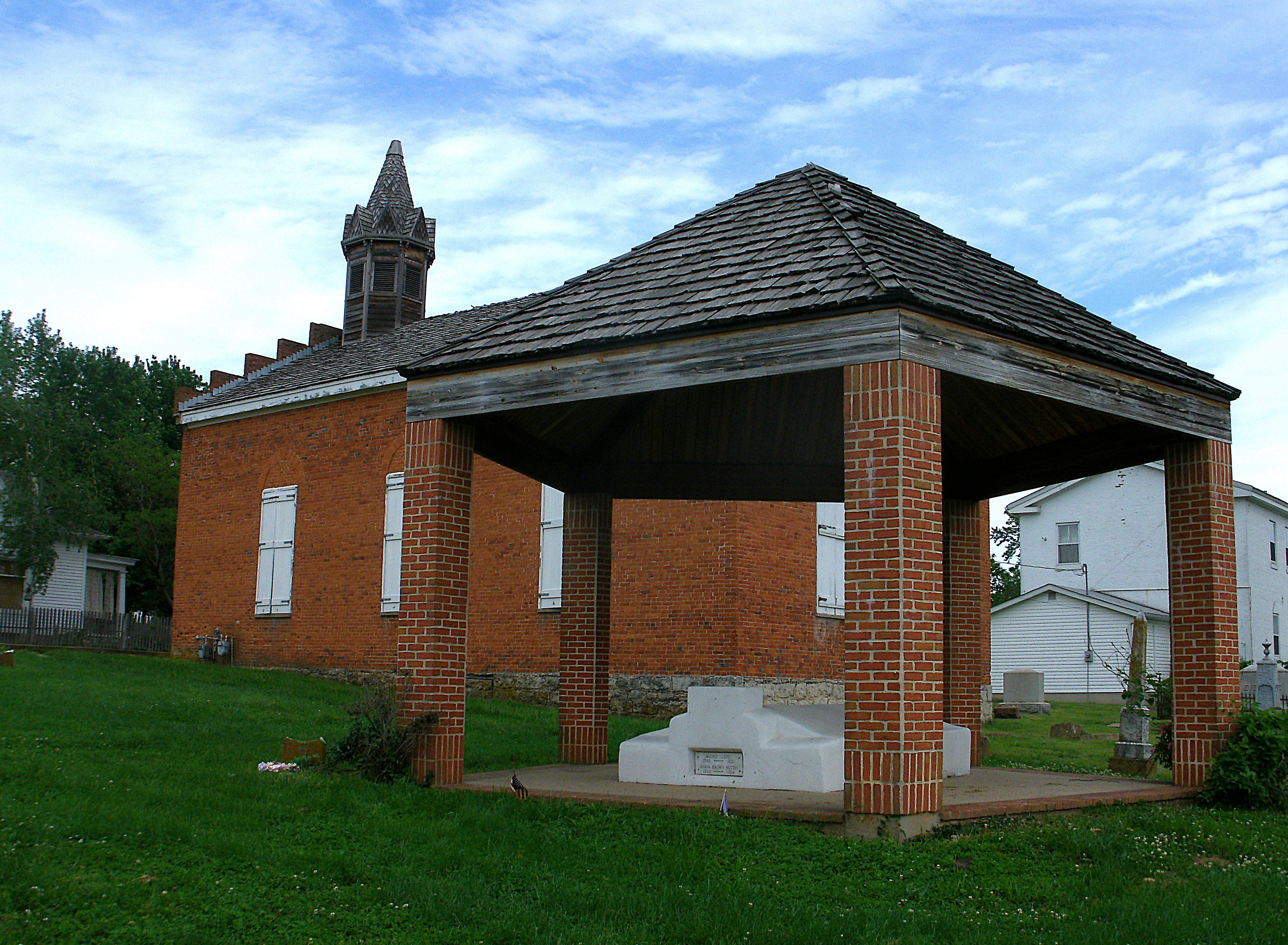
Tomb of Moses Austin and Maria Brown Austin in Potosi, behind the Presbyterian church built in 1832

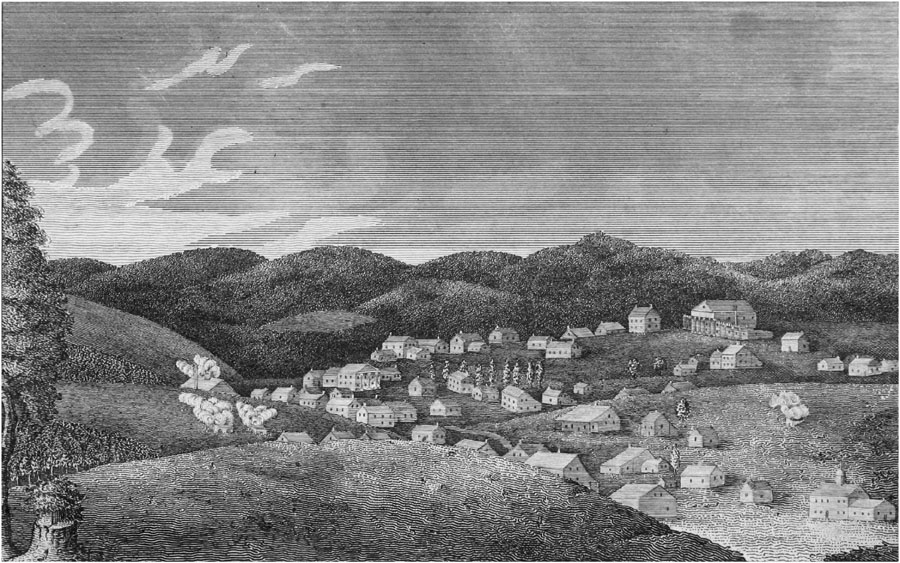
A view of Potosi published in 1819 by H.R. Schoolcraft, captioned Potosi, alias Mine á Burton

A lead mining settlement at this spot, "Mine à Breton" or Mine au Breton, was founded between 1760 and 1780 by Francis Azor, of Brittany, France. Moses Austin came here in 1798 with his family, including his son Stephen F. Austin. Moses obtained a grant of 7,153 arpents of land from the Spanish Empire and started large-scale mining operations, building his town to support it. Moses named the town after Potosí in Bolivia, which was famous for its vast silver mines. Austin's tomb and the foundation of his home Durham Hall can still be seen. Another mining entrepreneur in Potosi at the time of Moses Austin was James Bryan. Firmin Rene Desloge, who emigrated from Nantes, France in 1822 as the progenitor of the Desloge Family in America, settled in Potosi and established a mercantile, distillery, fur trading and lead smelting business. The Desloge lead mining business, Desloge Lead Company (later Desloge Consolidated Lead Company) was eventually relocated to Bonne Terre, and eventually Desloge, by Firmin V. Desloge.

Potosi was designated county seat in 1814.

Potosi is also home to the oldest standing Presbyterian church west of the Mississippi River. It is located on West Breton Street, also home to the graveyard that contains the tomb of Moses Austin and his wife Maria Brown Austin.

The Potosi Correctional Center, which opened in 1989, housed Missouri's death row until 2005. The Potosi Center conducted all but one of the sixty-two Missouri executions between 1989 and 2005, when executions were moved to the Eastern Reception, Diagnostic and Correctional Center in Bonne Terre.

The George Cresswell Furnace, Palmer Historic Mining District, Washington County Courthouse, and Washington State Park CCC Historic District are listed on the National Register of Historic Places.

== Geography ==
According to the United States Census Bureau, the city has a total area of 2.33 square miles (6.03 km^{2}), all land.

Potosi is located in the Lead Belt region of Missouri; as such, it has mining operations in the area. It is also geographically considered part of the St. Francois Mountain Range, meaning it has hilly terrain typical of the region.

The city is within proximity to many nature areas, including Mark Twain National Forest and Washington State Park.

=== Climate ===
Climate data for Potosi 4 SW, Missouri (1991–2020 normals, extremes 1893–present)
Month	Jan	Feb	Mar	Apr	May	Jun	Jul	Aug	Sep	Oct	Nov	Dec	Year
Record high °F (°C)	74 (23)	80 (27)	88 (31)	93 (34)	94 (34)	106 (41)	112 (44)	104 (40)	101 (38)	92 (33)	84 (29)	77 (25)	112 (44)
Mean maximum °F (°C)	65.1 (18.4)	70.1 (21.2)	77.7 (25.4)	84.5 (29.2)	87.7 (30.9)	90.9 (32.7)	94.5 (34.7)	94.5 (34.7)	90.4 (32.4)	83.8 (28.8)	74.3 (23.5)	64.7 (18.2)	96.4 (35.8)
Mean daily maximum °F (°C)	39.6 (4.2)	45.3 (7.4)	55.1 (12.8)	66.3 (19.1)	74.0 (23.3)	81.9 (27.7)	86.0 (30.0)	85.2 (29.6)	77.8 (25.4)	67.5 (19.7)	54.1 (12.3)	43.4 (6.3)	64.7 (18.2)
Daily mean °F (°C)	30.5 (−0.8)	35.2 (1.8)	44.3 (6.8)	55.3 (12.9)	64.1 (17.8)	72.3 (22.4)	76.3 (24.6)	75.1 (23.9)	67.4 (19.7)	56.9 (13.8)	44.7 (7.1)	34.9 (1.6)	54.8 (12.7)
Mean daily minimum °F (°C)	21.4 (−5.9)	25.2 (−3.8)	33.5 (0.8)	44.3 (6.8)	54.1 (12.3)	62.8 (17.1)	66.7 (19.3)	65.0 (18.3)	56.9 (13.8)	46.2 (7.9)	35.3 (1.8)	26.4 (−3.1)	44.8 (7.1)
Mean minimum °F (°C)	0.6 (−17.4)	6.3 (−14.3)	14.8 (−9.6)	28.5 (−1.9)	38.5 (3.6)	50.5 (10.3)	56.0 (13.3)	54.8 (12.7)	42.4 (5.8)	29.4 (−1.4)	17.4 (−8.1)	7.1 (−13.8)	−3.0 (−19.4)
Record low °F (°C)	−18 (−28)	−28 (−33)	−3 (−19)	12 (−11)	26 (−3)	36 (2)	42 (6)	41 (5)	16 (−9)	11 (−12)	0 (−18)	−26 (−32)	−28 (−33)
Average precipitation inches (mm)	2.84 (72)	2.69 (68)	4.09 (104)	5.11 (130)	5.29 (134)	4.15 (105)	3.64 (92)	4.00 (102)	3.89 (99)	3.07 (78)	3.72 (94)	2.97 (75)	45.46 (1,155)
Average snowfall inches (cm)	3.6 (9.1)	2.9 (7.4)	1.9 (4.8)	0.0 (0.0)	0.0 (0.0)	0.0 (0.0)	0.0 (0.0)	0.0 (0.0)	0.0 (0.0)	0.0 (0.0)	0.7 (1.8)	2.4 (6.1)	11.5 (29)
Average precipitation days (≥ 0.01 in)	7.2	7.9	10.7	10.7	12.6	10.0	8.5	8.5	7.4	8.4	7.9	8.8	108.6
Average snowy days (≥ 0.1 in)	2.4	2.7	1.0	0.1	0.0	0.0	0.0	0.0	0.0	0.0	0.5	2.0	8.7
Source: NOAA

== Demographics ==
Historical population
Census	Pop.	Note	%±
1860	548		—
1870	897		63.7%
1880	715		−20.3%
1890	599		−16.2%
1900	638		6.5%
1910	772		21.0%
1920	984		27.5%
1930	1,279		30.0%
1940	2,017		57.7%
1950	2,359		17.0%
1960	2,805		18.9%
1970	2,761		−1.6%
1980	2,528		−8.4%
1990	2,683		6.1%
2000	2,662		−0.8%
2010	2,660		−0.1%
2020	2,538		−4.6%
U.S. Decennial Census

=== 2020 census ===
As of the 2020 census, Potosi had a population of 2,538. The median age was 39.9 years. 22.9% of residents were under the age of 18 and 21.5% of residents were 65 years of age or older. For every 100 females there were 81.8 males, and for every 100 females age 18 and over there were 78.6 males age 18 and over.

0.0% of residents lived in urban areas, while 100.0% lived in rural areas.

There were 1,043 households in Potosi, of which 31.2% had children under the age of 18 living in them. Of all households, 33.5% were married-couple households, 19.6% were households with a male householder and no spouse or partner present, and 37.2% were households with a female householder and no spouse or partner present. About 35.0% of all households were made up of individuals and 14.5% had someone living alone who was 65 years of age or older.

There were 1,193 housing units, of which 12.6% were vacant. The homeowner vacancy rate was 4.3% and the rental vacancy rate was 8.9%.

Racial composition as of the 2020 census
Race	Number	Percent
White	2,282	89.9%
Black or African American	49	1.9%
American Indian and Alaska Native	4	0.2%
Asian	8	0.3%
Native Hawaiian and Other Pacific Islander	0	0.0%
Some other race	25	1.0%
Two or more races	170	6.7%
Hispanic or Latino (of any race)	33	1.3%

=== 2010 census ===
As of the census of 2010, there were 2,660 people, 1,114 households, and 657 families living in the city. The population density was 1,141.6 inhabitants per square mile (440.8/km^{2}). There were 1,230 housing units at an average density of 527.9 per square mile (203.8/km^{2}). The racial makeup of the city was 95.2% White, 2.2% African American, 0.4% Native American, 0.4% Asian, 0.3% from other races, and 1.6% from two or more races. Hispanic or Latino of any race were 1.6% of the population.

There were 1,114 households, of which 32.2% had children under the age of 18 living with them, 37.0% were married couples living together, 17.8% had a female householder with no husband present, 4.2% had a male householder with no wife present, and 41.0% were non-families. 36.4% of all households were made up of individuals, and 14.9% had someone living alone who was 65 years of age or older. The average household size was 2.23 and the average family size was 2.86.

The median age in the city was 39.1 years. 24.2% of residents were under the age of 18; 8.8% were between the ages of 18 and 24; 23.9% were from 25 to 44; 24.3% were from 45 to 64; and 18.7% were 65 years of age or older. The gender makeup of the city was 44.1% male and 55.9% female.

=== 2000 census ===
As of the census of 2000, there were 2,662 people, 1,103 households, and 677 families living in the city. The population density was 1,218.9 inhabitants per square mile (470.6/km^{2}). There were 1,211 housing units at an average density of 554.5 per square mile (214.1/km^{2}). The racial makeup of the city was 95.60% White, 2.14% African American, 0.45% Native American, 0.15% Asian, 0.23% from other races, and 1.43% from two or more races. Hispanic or Latino of any race were 0.83% of the population.

There were 1,103 households, out of which 33.3% had children under the age of 18 living with them, 40.1% were married couples living together, 17.7% had a female householder with no husband present, and 38.6% were non-families. 35.7% of all households were made up of individuals, and 17.8% had someone living alone who was 65 years of age or older. The average household size was 2.30 and the average family size was 2.97.

In the city, the population was spread out, with 26.7% under the age of 18, 9.2% from 18 to 24, 25.9% from 25 to 44, 20.2% from 45 to 64, and 18.0% who were 65 years of age or older. The median age was 36 years. For every 100 females there were 81.5 males. For every 100 females age 18 and over, there were 75.9 males.

The median income for a household in the city was $17,702, and the median income for a family was $23,958. Males had a median income of $31,548 versus $16,976 for females. The per capita income for the city was $12,417. About 28.1% of families and 31.4% of the population were below the poverty line, including 42.7% of those under age 18 and 13.9% of those age 65 or over.

== Government and infrastructure ==
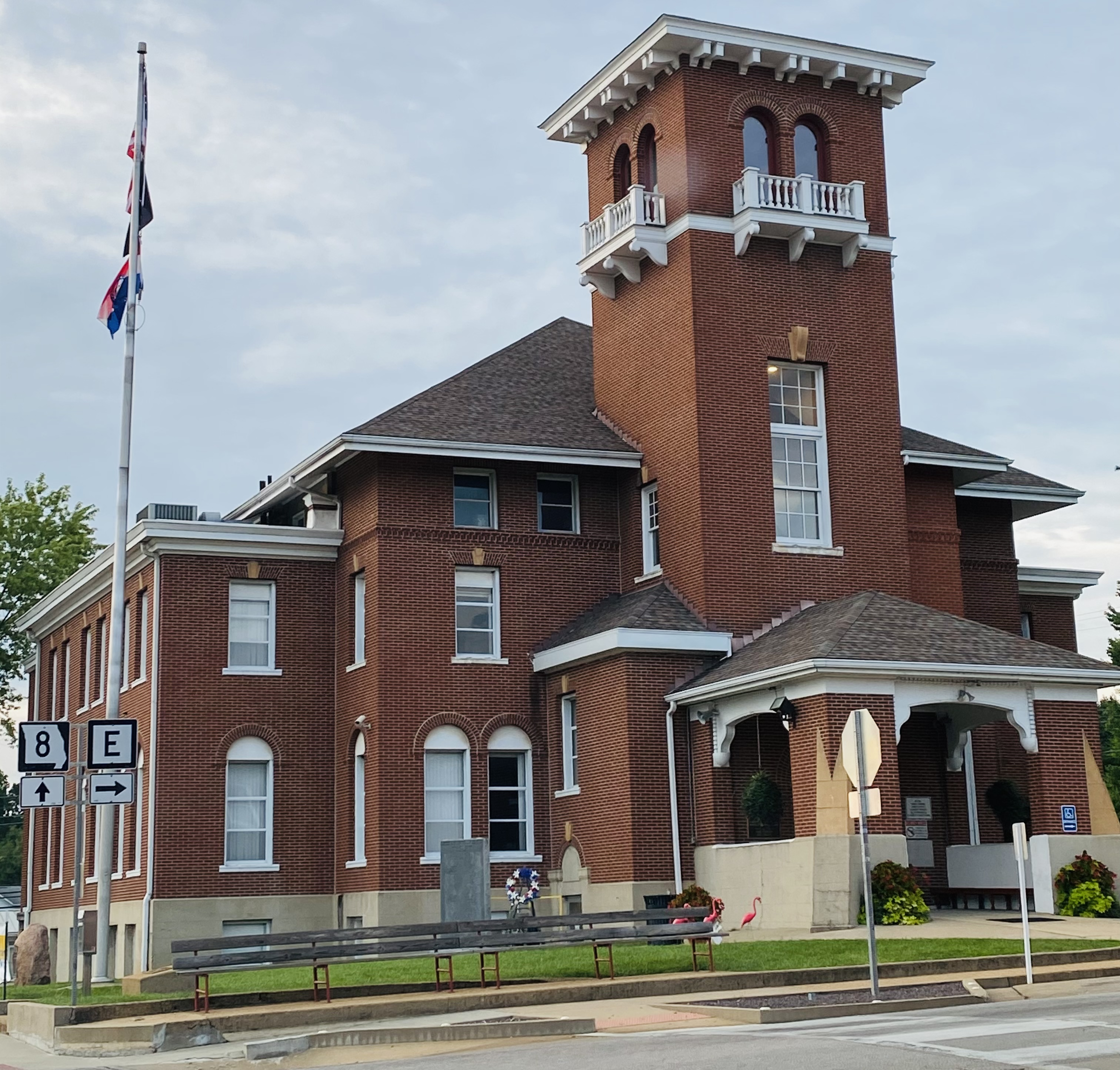
Washington County Courthouse

Potosi is the county seat of Washington County, and therefore contains both city and county government offices in City Hall and the Washington County Courthouse, respectively.

The United States Postal Service operates the Potosi Post Office.

The Potosi Correctional Center of the Missouri Department of Corrections is located in an unincorporated area in Washington County, near Potosi. The prison houses male death row inmates.

== Education ==
Public education in Potosi is administered by the Potosi R-III School District. Potosi has a public library, the Washington County Library.

== Notable people ==
- Moses Austin (1761–1821), businessman and empressario
- Parke M. Banta (1891–1970), politician
- Wilson Bell (1897–1947), politician
- Jeremy Boyer (born 1980), stadium organist
- Pete Casey (1895–1976), American football player
- Don Choate (1938–2018), baseball player
- Dylan Coleman (born 1996), baseball player
- Nathan Cooper (born 1973), politician
- Wayne Crump (born 1949 or 1950), politician
- Firmin René Desloge (1803–1856), businessman
- Firmin V. Desloge (1843–1929), industrialist
- Paul Fitzwater (born 1959), politician
- Tom Huck (born 1971), printmaker
- Jim LaMarque (1921–2000), baseball player
- John A. Lankford (1874–1946), architect
- Stephen Samuel Perry (1825–1874), plantation manager
- William B. Teasdale (1856–1907), politician and judge
- Donne Wall (born 1967), baseball player
- Rodney Charles Wilson (born 1965), educator

== See also ==
- List of cities in Missouri
