= Whites Creek (Brazil Creek tributary) =

Stream in the American state of Missouri

Whites Creek is a stream in eastern Crawford County in the U.S. state of Missouri. It is a tributary of Brazil Creek.

The stream headwaters arise at 38°01′27″N 91°06′15″W and it flows to the north-northeast crossing under Missouri Route N just south of its confluence with Brazil Creek at 38°05′10″N 91°06′07″W.

Anthonies Mill on Brazil Creek is one mile east of the confluence in Washington County. The community of Vilander was about 1.5 miles to the west of the confluence. Bourbon lies about nine miles to the northwest on Route N.

Whites Creek most likely has the name of a local family.

== See also ==
- List of rivers of Missouri
