= Dry Creek (Huzzah Creek tributary) =

Stream in the US state of Missouri

Dry Creek is a stream in southern Crawford County in southeast Missouri. It is a tributary of Huzzah Creek.

The stream headwaters arise about three miles northwest of Dillard and it meanders to the north crossing under routes H and 49 about one mile southeast of Cherryville. The stream continues to the north passing the community of Westover and on to its confluence with Huzzah Creek just south of Missouri Route 8 about 3.5 miles east of Elayer.

The stream source is at 37°45′07″N 91°14′19″W and its confluence is at 37°58′27″N 91°12′20″W.

The stream was named Dry Creek due to the stretches along the stream course where the stream is dry or flows under the streambed sediments.
