= Cherry Valley Creek (Missouri) =

River in Missouri, United States

Cherry Valley Creek is a stream in Crawford County in the U.S. state of Missouri. It is a tributary of Dry Creek.

The stream headwaters arise just north of Missouri Route 19 about two miles southwest of Cherryville (at 37°50′22″N 91°18′25″W) and it meanders to the northeast and north passing under route 19 north of Cherryville. The stream continues to the northeast to enter Dry Creek about seven miles east of Steelville and two miles north of the community of Westover (at 37.9°N 91.2°W).

Cherry Valley Creek was named for the cherry-tree lined valley which surrounds it.

== See also ==
- List of rivers of Missouri
