= Delhi, Missouri =

Unincorporated community in Missouri, U.S.

Coordinates: 38°07′42″N 91°20′52″W

Delhi is an unincorporated community in Crawford County, in the U.S. state of Missouri. The community was located west-southwest of Bourbon on the Little Bourbeuse River. The community of Argo was also on the river, approximately three miles to the north (downstream).

== History ==
A post office called Delhi was established in 1883, and remained in operation until 1905. The community's name is a transfer from Delhi, India.
