= Whittenburg Creek =

Stream in the US state of Missouri

Whittenburg Creek is a stream in Crawford County in the U.S. state of Missouri.

The stream headwaters are at 37°52′46″N 91°20′34″W and its confluence with the Meramec River is at 37°59′57″N 91°21′07″W. The stream source area lies between Steelville and Cherryville. The stream flows generally north passing under Route 19 south of Steelville and under Route 8 just east of Steelville. The stream flows past the historic community of Sankey and on north to join the Meramec at Birds Nest.

Whittenburg Creek has the name of a local family.

== Tributaries ==
- Yadkin Creek

== See also ==
- List of rivers of Missouri
