= Cherry Valley =

Cherry Valley may refer to:

Places in the United States:

- Cherry Valley, Arkansas
- Cherry Valley, California, in Riverside County
- Cherry Valley, Illinois
- Cherry Valley, Massachusetts, neighbourhood of Leicester
- Cherry Valley, Missouri
- Cherry Valley National Wildlife Refuge, in eastern Pennsylvania
- Cherry Valley, New York, site of:
  - The Cherry Valley massacre, an event during the American Revolutionary War
- Cherry Valley (village), New York
- Cherry Valley Creek (New York)
  - Cherry Valley (valley), New York, valley running along Cherry Valley Creek
- Cherry Valley, Pennsylvania, borough in western Pennsylvania
- Cherry Valley, Tennessee
- Cherry Valley Township, Winnebago County, Illinois
- Cherry Valley Township, Michigan
- Cherry Valley Township, Ohio
- Camp Cherry Valley in California, on Catalina Island

Places in Canada:

- Cherry Valley, Prince Edward County, Ontario

== See also ==
- Cherryvalley
- Cherry Valley (album), a 2025 album by Carter Faith
- Cherry Valley O-scale Model Railroad Club, in Merchantville, New Jersey
