= Brush Creek (Bourbeuse River tributary) =

Stream in the U.S. state of Missouri

Brush Creek is a stream in Crawford and Gasconade counties in the U.S. state of Missouri. It is a tributary to the Bourbeuse River.

The stream headwaters arise in western Crawford County at 38°02′20″N 91°30′29″W just south of Interstate 44 west of Fanning and east of Rosati in adjacent Phelps County. The stream flows northeast under I-44 and turns north adjacent to the Cuba airport. The stream is impounded in the small Indian Lake. Below the Indian Lake dam the stream meanders parallel to and then passes under Missouri Route 19 past Oak Hill and enters southeastern Gasconade County. The stream confluence with the Bourbeuse is about one mile north of the Crawford-Gasconade county line at 38°13′35″N 91°26′16″W.

Brush Creek was named for the brush lining its course.

== See also ==
- List of rivers of Missouri
