= Midland, Missouri =

Unincorporated community in Missouri, U.S.

Coordinates: 37°58′42″N 91°19′38″W

Midland is an unincorporated community in Crawford County, in the U.S. state of Missouri. The community was located along Missouri Route 8 near the Missouri Route TT intersection approximately two miles east of Steelville. The Midland School was about one-half mile to the northwest on a bluff above Whittenburg Creek.

== History ==
A post office called Midland was established in 1875, and remained in operation until 1896. The community took its name from the Midland Blast Furnace Company.
