= Service, Missouri =

Unincorporated community in Missouri, U.S.

Coordinates: 37°58′17″N 91°08′45″W

Service is an unincorporated community in eastern Crawford County, in the U.S. state of Missouri. The community is located on a small tributary along the east bank of Courtois Creek, approximately 2.5 miles west of the Crawford-Washington county line. Missouri Route 8 passes on the ridge about one-half mile to the southwest. The community of Butts lies about 1.5 miles downstream (northwest) and Berryman is about four miles to the southeast (upstream). The old Service School was located at the site in the 1940s.

== History ==
A post office called Service was established in 1886, and remained in operation until 1896. The origin of the name Service is unknown.
