= Whites Creek =

Whites Creek may refer to:

- Whites Creek (Brazil Creek), a stream in Missouri
- Whites Creek (Eleven Point River), a stream in Missouri
- Whites Creek (Hunter Creek), a stream in Missouri
- Whites Creek, Tennessee, an unincorporated community
- Whites Creek Historic District NRHP listed district in Nashville, Tennessee
- Whites Creek (West Virginia), a stream
- Whites Creek (Annandale), a stream in Australia
- Whites Creek High School, Nashville, Tennessee

== See also ==
- White Creek (disambiguation)
