= Coffeyton, Missouri =

Unincorporated community in Missouri, US

Coordinates: 38°07′00″N 91°16′23″W

Coffeyton is an unincorporated community in northern Crawford County, in the U.S. state of Missouri. The community is located on the railroad line, approximately two miles northeast of Leasburg and three miles southwest of Bourbon.

== History ==
A post office called Coffeyton was established in 1882, and remained in operation until 1918. The community was named after Joel T. Coffee, a local physician.
