= Butts, Missouri =

Unincorporated community in Missouri, U.S.

Coordinates: 37°59′45″N 91°09′23″W

Butts is an unincorporated community in eastern Crawford County, in the U.S. state of Missouri. The community is on the north side of Henpeck Hollow about one-half mile east of Courtois Creek. Access is via a county road from Missouri Route 8, approximately five miles east of Elayer. The location is within the Mark Twain National Forest and a campground is located on the Courtois River to the west of the site.

== History ==
A post office called Butts was established in 1902, and remained in operation until 1954. The community has the name of the local Butts family.
