= Little Bourbeuse River =

Stream in the state of Missouri

The Little Bourbeuse River is a stream in Crawford, Gasconade and Franklin counties in the Ozarks of Missouri. It is a tributary of the Bourbeuse River.

The stream headwaters arise in Crawford County just south of the community of Leasburg at 38°05′14″N 91°17′34″W. The stream flows generally north passing under Interstate 44 approximately three miles northeast of Cuba. It enters southwestern Franklin County 1.5 miles north of the community of Argo. The stream flows north adjacent to the Franklin-Gasconade county line and crosses into Gasconade County for a short distance before turning east and north to enter the Bourbeuse River 2.5 miles northeast of the community of Japan at 38°15′52″N 91°20′30″W.
