= Canaan Hollow =

Valley in Missouri, United States

Coordinates: 37.8175438°N 91.434869°W

Canaan Hollow is a valley in Crawford County in the U.S. state of Missouri.

Canaan Hollow took its name from the local Canaan Cumberland Presbyterian Church.
