= Fort Diggings Hollow =

Valley in Missouri, United States

Coordinates: 37.9797676°N 91.1606944°W

Fort Diggings Hollow is a valley in Crawford County in the U.S. state of Missouri.

Fort Diggings Hollow derives its name from Pat Fort, a local prospector.
