= Cicero Creek =

Cicero Creek is the name of the following American streams:

- Cicero Creek (Indiana)
- Cicero Creek (Missouri)
