= Cherry Valley, Missouri =

Unincorporated community in the US state of Missouri

Coordinates: 37°57′17″N 91°16′00″W

Cherry Valley is an unincorporated community in Crawford County, in the U.S. state of Missouri.

The community is at the intersection of Cherry Valley Road with Missouri Route BB. The Cherry Valley cemetery is approximately one mile to the southeast. The community of Elayer is about 1.5 miles to the northeast and Steelville is five miles to the west-northwest.

== History ==
A post office called Cherry Valley was established in 1853, and remained in operation until 1857. The community was named for the valley of the Cherry Valley Creek.
