= Harrison Mills =

Harrison Mills may refer to:

- Harrison Mills, British Columbia
- Harrison Mills, Ohio
- Harrison Mills, Missouri
- Harrison Mills, member of American electronic music duo, Odesza
