= Hofflins, Missouri =

Unincorporated community in Missouri, US

Coordinates: 38°05′45″N 91°21′39″W

Hofflins is an unincorporated community in western Crawford County, in the U.S. state of Missouri. The community is adjacent to I-44 approximately three miles northeast of Cuba and Leasburg lies three miles to the east. The St. Louis and San Francisco Railroad line passes through the location.

== History ==
A post office called Hofflin was established in 1903, and remained in operation until 1943. The community has the name of the original owner of the site.
