= Scotia Iron Furnace Stack =

- U.S. National Register of Historic Places
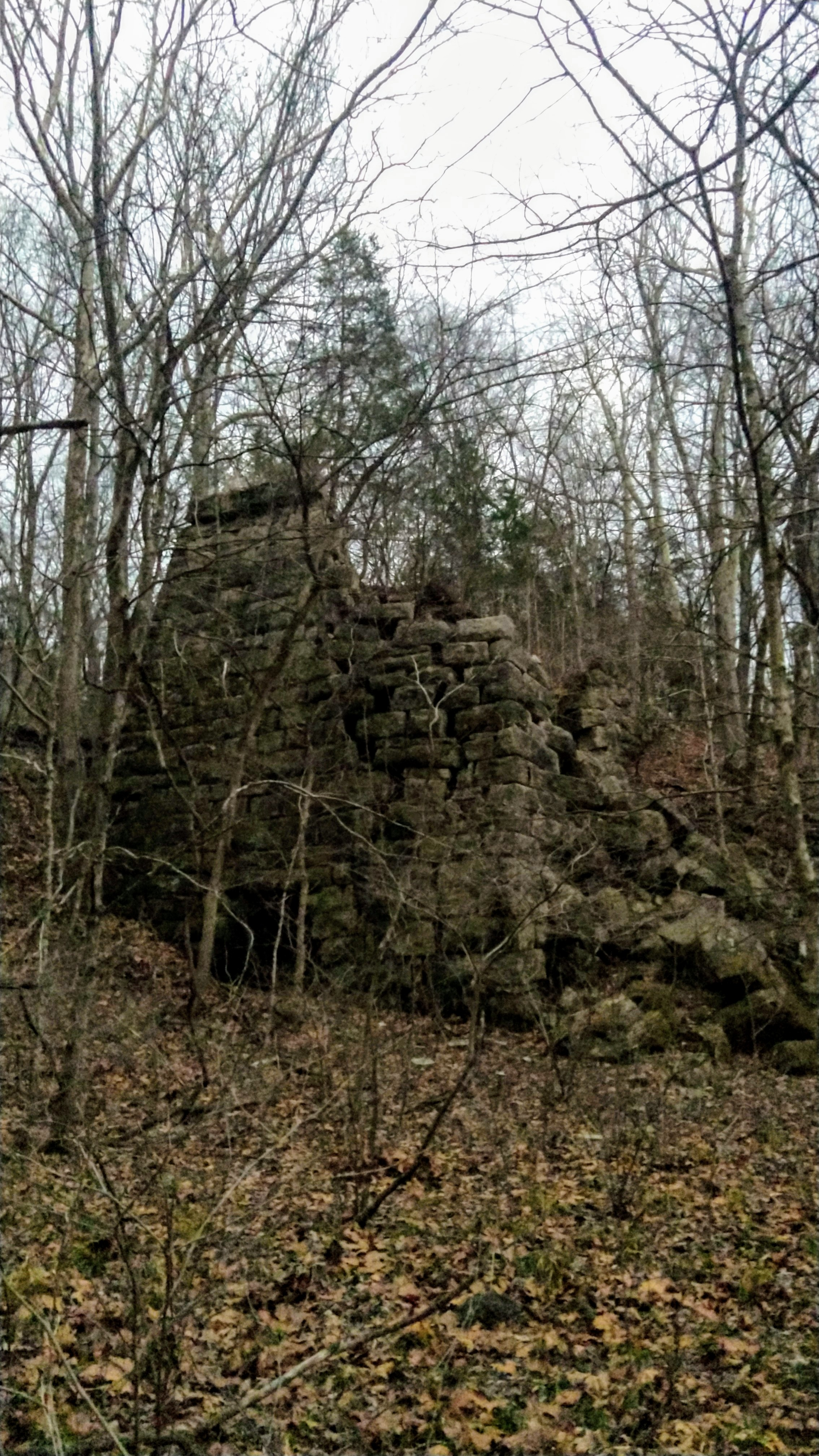

- Location within Missouri Location within the United States
- Location: 6.3 miles (10.1 km) south east of Leasburg on County Road H, near Leasburg, Missouri
- Coordinates: 38°02′15″N 91°11′47″W
- Area: 0 acres (0 ha)
- Built: c. 1870
- NRHP reference No.: 69000099
- Added to NRHP: May 21, 1969

Scotia Iron Furnace Stack is a historic iron furnace stack located near Leasburg, Crawford County, Missouri. It was built about 1870 by the Scotia Iron Works, and is 35 feet wide at the base, and approximately 40 feet high. It is constructed of native limestone blocks. The furnace remained in operation until 1880.

It was listed on the National Register of Historic Places in 1969.
