= Cherry Valley Creek =

Cherry Valley Creek may refer to:

- Cherry Valley Creek (Missouri)
- Cherry Valley Creek (New York)
