= Yadkin Creek =

Stream in the US state of Missouri

Location
- Country: United States
- State: Missouri

Physical characteristics
- Source
  - location: Crawford County, Missouri
  - coordinates: 37°53′40″N 91°22′26″W
- Mouth: Whittenburg Creek
  - location: east of Steelville, Missouri
  - coordinates: 37°58′25″N 91°20′27″W

Yadkin Creek is a stream in Crawford County in the U.S. state of Missouri.

The stream headwaters are at 37°53′40″N 91°22′26″W and its confluence with Whittenburg Creek just east of Steelville is at 37°58′25″N 91°20′27″W.

The name may be a transfer from the Yadkin River in North Carolina.

== See also ==
- List of rivers of Missouri
