= Hinch, Missouri =

Unincorporated community in the U.S. state of Missouri

Coordinates: 38°03′46″N 91°09′20″W

Hinch is an unincorporated community in eastern Crawford County, in the U.S. state of Missouri.

The community is on Hinch Branch, a small tributary of the Meramec River. Onondaga Cave State Park is 3.5 miles to the west and the community of Vilander is 2.5 miles to the northeast.

== History ==
A post office called Hinch was established in 1896, and remained in operation until 1954. The community was named after William Hinch, an early settler.
