= Patsy, Missouri =

Unincorporated community in Missouri, U.S.

Coordinates: 37°57′43″N 91°16′21″W

Patsy is an unincorporated community in Crawford County, in the U.S. state of Missouri. The community is located on Missouri Route BB, along a ridge southeast of Elayer.

== History ==
A post office called Patsy was established in 1894, and remained in operation until 1927. The community was named after Patsy Whalen, a mining official.
