= Cicero Creek (Missouri) =

Stream in the US state of Missouri

Coordinates: 38°01′33″N 91°03′37″W

Cicero Creek is a stream in western Washington County in the U.S. state of Missouri. It is a tributary of Brazil Creek.

The stream headwaters arise at approximately at an elevation of approximately 1040 feet. The stream flows generally west for 2.5 miles to its confluence with Brazil Creek at at an elevation of 780 feet. The confluence is adjacent to Missouri Route W four miles south-southeast of Anthonies Mill.

Cicero Creek took its name from the nearby extinct community of Cicero.

== See also ==
- List of rivers of Missouri
