= Oak Hill Township, Crawford County, Missouri =

Township in Crawford County, Missouri, U.S.

Coordinates: 38.1728°N 91.4119°W

Oak Hill Township is an inactive township in Crawford County, in the U.S. state of Missouri.

Oak Hill Township was named after the community of Oak Hill, Missouri.
