= Indian Creek (Huzzah Creek tributary) =

Stream in the U.S. state of Missouri

Indian Creek is a stream in Crawford and Dent counties in the U.S. state of Missouri. It is a tributary of Huzzah Creek. The stream headwaters arise in northern Dent County at 37°40′28″N 91°17′02″W at an elevation of 1300 feet. The stream flows northeast into Crawford County and enters Hazzah Creek about one mile south of the community of Dillard and Missouri Route 49 at 37°43′02″N 91°12′21″W and an elevation of 899 feet.

Indian Creek was named for the fact traces of Native American settlement were found along its course.

== See also ==
- List of rivers of Missouri
