= List of killings by law enforcement officers in the United States, May 2016 =

This is a list of people reported killed by non-military law enforcement officers in the United States in May 2016, whether in the line of duty or not, and regardless of reason or method. The listing documents the occurrence of a death, making no implications regarding wrongdoing or justification on the part of the person killed or officer involved. Killings are arranged by date of the incident that caused death. Different death dates, if known, are noted in the description. The table below lists 87 people.

== May 2016 ==
Date	Name (age) of deceased	State (city)	Description
2016-05-31	Berger, Nicholas (36)	Oregon (Bend)	Berger was shot after he held a woman around the neck with a knife held to her throat, threatening to kill her inside the High Desert Museum. The events leading up to the incident have not been disclosed.
2016-05-30	Wickizer, Robert (70)	Oregon (Tualatin)	
2016-05-30	Calix, Osee (33)	Arizona (Tucson)	Calix was detained for crashing his bike and lying about his name. He apparently gave police a false name. He pulled a gun and was shot and killed.
2016-05-29	Todero, Charles (30)	Indiana (Greenwood)	Police said they were responding to a call that Todero was acting erratically, walking in between traffic. They tased him and he fell unconscious. He died after being in a coma for two weeks. He was unarmed.
2016-05-29	Burroughs, Todd (38)	North Carolina (Stoneville)	
2016-05-29	Coffey, John (53)	North Carolina (Clinton)	
2016-05-29	Garza, Dionisio (25)	Texas (Houston)	Army veteran Dionisio Garza III from Rancho Cucamonga started to shoot randomly at a Conoco gas station at the corner of Wycliffe and Memorial Drive around 10:15 a.m., killing 56-year-old Eugene Linscomb who sat in his Mercedes and injuring six people, among them two responding officers, before being fatally shot by a SWAT officer.
2016-05-29	Brown, Ronald (32)	Florida (DeLand)	
2016-05-28	Hudson, Dennis (50)	Alabama (Eastaboga)	
2016-05-28	Humphrey, Dennis (58)	New Mexico (Albuquerque)	
2016-05-28	Carraman, Ernesto (41)	Texas (San Antonio)	
2016-05-28	Brooks, Ollie (64)	Oklahoma (Tulsa)	
2016-05-27	Edwards, Terry (59)	Indiana (Indianapolis)	
2016-05-26	Christian, Warren (43)	Illinois (Lansing)	
2016-05-26	Unnamed woman (possibly Tonnia Davis (48) )	Florida (Sneads)	
2016-05-26	Gates, Devonte (21)	Illinois (Washington Park)	
2016-05-26	Navarro, Angel (25)	New Mexico (Socorro)	
2016-05-26	Castro, Fernando (19)	California (Solvang)	Castro was wanted on an Amber Alert for kidnapping. After a chase and a carjacking, he was shot and killed inside a vehicle. The girl he had allegedly kidnapped, 15-year-old Pearl Pinson, was not with him and as of 2024 has never been found.
2016-05-26	Smith, Eugene (29)	Minnesota (St. Paul)	
2016-05-26	Garcia, Donovan (44)	Texas (San Antonio)	
2016-05-25	Louis, Doll (24)	Florida (Miami Gardens)	
2016-05-25	Prophet, Derek (43)	Oklahoma (Oklahoma City)	
2016-05-24	Goletz, Leslie (57)	Missouri (Peculiar)	
2016-05-24	Montoya, Mario (31)	New Mexico (Albuquerque)	
2016-05-24	Phelps, Bodhi (22)	Oregon (Gresham)	Wilson was fatally shot by officers after allegedly assaulting and forcing a woman into a car in a Gresham.
2016-05-23	Bedonie, Verl (26)	Arizona (Flagstaff)	
2016-05-23	Zambrano, Jorge (35)	Massachusetts (Auburn)	After killing 42-year-old officer Ronald Tarentino during a traffic stop at 00:30 a.m. on May 22 in Auburn, Zambrano fled into a duplex apartment in Oxford, about 7 miles south of Auburn, where he was killed in the early hours of May 23 by members of a STOP team raiding the apartment.
2016-05-22	Fischer, Bryson (28)	Colorado (Boulder)	
2016-05-22	Wilson, Michael (27)	Florida (Hallandale Beach)	
2016-05-22	Bing, Vernell (22)	Florida (Jacksonville)	
2016-05-21	Moore, Travis (38)	Oregon (Oregon City)	
2016-05-21	Campbell, Norman (63)	South Carolina (Chesterfield)	
2016-05-21	Nelson, Mark (31)	Arizona (Flagstaff)	
2016-05-20	Beebee, Joshua (31)	Nebraska (Omaha)	
2016-05-19	Williams, Jessica (29)	California (San Francisco)	Williams was shot while fleeing in a suspected stolen car. She was unarmed.
2016-05-19	Carraway, Kentrill (22)	Florida (Miami)	
2016-05-19	Ide, Jaime (35)	California (Citrus Heights)	
2016-05-19	Stacy, Timothy (36)	Kentucky (Fisty)	
2016-05-19	Cruz, Jeremias (30)	Nevada (North Las Vegas)	Cruz beat a man to death and allegedly refused to follow orders. He attacked an officer and was shot and killed.
2016-05-18	Santos-Banos, Israel (20)	Arizona (Phoenix)	
2016-05-18	Weatherby, Joseph (44)	Missouri (West Sullivan)	Weatherby fled a traffic stop, likely because he was wanted for a probation violation. There was a car chase, then a foot chase, and then Weatherby displayed a handgun and was shot and killed.
2016-05-18	Conrad, Garry (46)	New York (New York City)	"According to accounts from police, witnesses and video footage, once outside the supermarket Conrad lunged at an officer with an 8-inch knife. That's when two cops fired a combined nine shots, killing Conrad."
2016-05-17	Sanders, Luke L. (36)	California (Siskiyou County)	On May 17 Sanders cut off his hand with an axe and was found acting in an irrational and threatening manner along the A-12 Road in rural Siskiyou County. Passersby were unable to assist Sanders, and alerted law enforcement. A California Highway Patrol officer and two county sheriff deputies responded. Sanders, armed with an axe, failed to follow commands and acted in a threatening manner. A confrontation ensued and the deputies shot Sanders multiple times. Despite life-saving efforts, Sanders died at the scene.
2016-05-16	Robinson, Jabril (23)	Georgia (Riverdale)	Robinson was shot and killed after trying to run away from officers who were responding to a domestic dispute between him and his girlfriend. Police said he had a gun; family members disputed this.
2016-05-16	Macomber, Scott (48)	Massachusetts (Fall River)	
2016-05-15	Pendleton, Dracy "Clint" (35)	Illinois (Golconda)	
2016-05-14	Johnson, Ryan (34)	Georgia (Stockbridge)	
2016-05-14	Sims, Jeffrey (59)	Florida (Osteen)	
2016-05-14	Clark, Francis (43)	Arizona (Phoenix)	Clark chased and then fatally shot a woman. He was killed by police when he began firing at them.
2016-05-14	Marsh, Cody (19)	Florida (Jacksonville)	After posting suicidal thoughts on Facebook, Marsh went to a McDonalds armed with knives and was shot and killed by police.
2016-05-13	Diaz, Robert (28)	California (Los Angeles)	
2016-05-13	Martinez, Mylynda (27)	Florida (Mascotte)	
2016-05-13	Gaffney, Michael (37)	New Jersey (Union)	Gaffney was unarmed when he got into a fight with an off-duty police officer who had been drinking. The officer shot and killed him.
2016-05-11	Schuster, Stephen "Lucifer" (35)	Colorado (Aurora)	
2016-05-11	Godfrey, Stephen (69)	Oklahoma (Byng)	
2016-05-11	Vilaysane, Thongsoune (33)	California (San Diego)	
2016-05-11	Mondragon, Sean (24)	Colorado (Evans)	
2016-05-10	DaRosa, Arthur (28)	Massachusetts (Taunton)	
2016-05-10	Friedrich, Nancy (35)	Texas (Kennedale)	During a welfare check on Friedrich, she allegedly threatened a deputy with a log and was behaving erratically. The deputy tasered her twice and she died shortly after.
2016-05-09	Napoli, Joseph (59)	Florida (Fort McCoy)	
2016-05-09	Stotts, Jamie (29)	Texas (Nacogdoches)	
2016-05-09	Smith, Jaffort (33)	Minnesota (St. Paul)	
2016-05-09	Johnson, Michael (26)	Illinois (Chicago)	
2016-05-09	Williams, Arthur (33)	Texas (El Paso)	Williams was shot by two officers when he ran out of a house waving a BB gun.
2016-05-09	Bowman, Christian (23)	Mississippi (Biloxi)	
2016-05-08	Larmon, Alexander (44)	Oklahoma (Cromwell)	Larmon was killed when his car was knocked off the road by a pursuing state trooper.
2016-05-08	Gibson, Lionel (21)	California (Long Beach)	
2016-05-07	Wilson, Kelly (26)	Illinois (Decatur)	
2016-05-07	Sam, Derek	Maine (Presque Isle)	
2016-05-07	Witchard, Alton (37)	Florida (St. Petersburg)	
2016-05-07	Cates, Nathan (29)	Washington (Lake Stevens)	
2016-05-06	Johnson, Burt (38)	Wisconsin (Milwaukee)	Milwaukee Police Department officers saw an armed robbery suspect after he robbed an auto parts store, and a foot chase ensued. The suspect turned around and fired at police, striking one officer in the chest. The 38-year-old wounded officer, who was wearing body armor, was taken to the hospital with "significant contusions." The officer was released from the hospital Friday morning. In the return fire, Johnson was killed.
2016-05-06	Williams, R.J. (23)	West Virginia (Reirton)	Suicide by cop. Notable for the police department firing the officer who recognized that the distressed African-American man, who was pleading with the white officer to "Just shoot me", did not pose an immediate threat, and therefore refused to shoot him. The man was killed after another police officer arrived, came to a different conclusion, and shot him dead within seconds of arriving on the scene.
2016-05-05 and 2016-05-06	Tordil, Gladys (44)	Maryland (Beltsville)	Eulalio Tordil shootings: Over the course of two days, Eulalio Tordil, a Federal Protective Service officer, shot six people, killing three of them. The first victim was his estranged wife, Gladys, who was shot outside their daughter's high school. The second, on May 6, was Winfell, who was shot outside the Westfield Montgomery after trying to stop Tordil from carjacking a vehicle. The last was Molina, who was carjacked and shot by Tordil. Tordil was arrested, charged, and found guilty.
2016-05-05 and 2016-05-06	Winfell, Malcom (45)	Maryland (Bethesda)	Eulalio Tordil shootings: Over the course of two days, Eulalio Tordil, a Federal Protective Service officer, shot six people, killing three of them. The first victim was his estranged wife, Gladys, who was shot outside their daughter's high school. The second, on May 6, was Winfell, who was shot outside the Westfield Montgomery after trying to stop Tordil from carjacking a vehicle. The last was Molina, who was carjacked and shot by Tordil. Tordil was arrested, charged, and found guilty.
2016-05-05 and 2016-05-06	Molina, Claudina (65)	Maryland (Aspen Hill)	Eulalio Tordil shootings: Over the course of two days, Eulalio Tordil, a Federal Protective Service officer, shot six people, killing three of them. The first victim was his estranged wife, Gladys, who was shot outside their daughter's high school. The second, on May 6, was Winfell, who was shot outside the Westfield Montgomery after trying to stop Tordil from carjacking a vehicle. The last was Molina, who was carjacked and shot by Tordil. Tordil was arrested, charged, and found guilty.
2016-05-05	Armstrong, Deresha (26)	Florida (Orlando)	
2016-05-05	DiGiovanni, Corey (36)	Louisiana (Gretna)	The shooting occurred as members of the West Bank Major Crimes Task Force pursued DiGiovanni, who fled as officers served a warrant as part of an investigation into heroin distribution in the New Orleans area. The department did not identify the officer who fired his gun.
2016-05-04	Thompson, Gerry (40)	Missouri (Buffalo)	
2016-05-04	Tucker, Matthew (18)	California (Temecula)	
2016-05-04	Ferretti, Richard (52)	Pennsylvania (Overbrook)	College students called police when they saw a man circling the neighborhood in a minivan and thought he was casing homes. A marked unit turned on its emergency lights behind the minivan while an unmarked police car stopped in front of the minivan. Police say both officers exited their vehicle and ordered the driver of the minivan to turn off the engine. The driver allegedly drove toward one of the officers, who fired four shots, hitting Ferretti in the chest. No weapons were found on him or in the minivan.
2016-05-04	DiTullio, Cayce (39)	Burien, Washington	After a report of gunshots, a deputy began following DiTullio's truck. DiTullio pulled into a driveway and opened his truck door. A deputy stated that he could see an "AR-15 style rifle" pointed at him. DiTullio was struck and killed when a deputy opened fire at him.
2016-05-03	Hopper, Raymond (59)	California (Visalia)	A Visalia Police officer, called to the scene of a domestic disturbance, shot and killed Raymond Hopper about 7:30 AM Tuesday. Hopper was carrying a knife as he approached the officer in front of the residence. When Hopper did not drop the knife as ordered, the officer shot three times, striking him in the chest and killing him.
2016-05-02	Dogan, Reginald (52)	South Carolina (Taylors)	
2016-05-01	Branch, Ronald (28)	Tennessee (Alamo)	
2016-05-01	Charles, Charlin (25)	Florida (Orlando)	Charles was shot by two officers after a 911 call reported him walking down the road with a fake firearm.
2016-05-01	Clinkscales, Benston (26)	South Carolina (Anderson)	Clinkscales died after being tased and arrested by police.

== See also ==
- Death in custody § United States
- Henry A. Wallace Police Crime Public Database
- List of cases of police brutality
- List of countries with annual rates and counts for killings by law enforcement officers
- List of law enforcement officers killed in the line of duty in the United States
- List of law enforcement officers convicted for an on-duty killing in the United States
- List of shootings by US immigration agents
- List of police reforms related to the George Floyd protests
- List of unarmed African Americans killed by law enforcement officers in the United States
- Lists of killings by law enforcement officers
- Police brutality in the United States
- Police misconduct § United States
- Police riot § United States
- Police use of deadly force in the United States
