= Indian Lake, Missouri =

- Census-designated place
- Location within Missouri Location within the United States
- Coordinates: 38°05′37″N 91°27′11″W
- Country: United States
- State: Missouri
- County: Crawford
- Townships: Knobview; Benton

Area
  - Total: 1.92 sq mi (4.96 km^{2})
  - Land: 1.44 sq mi (3.72 km^{2})
  - Water: 0.48 sq mi (1.24 km^{2})
- Elevation: 925 ft (282 m)

Population (2020)
  - Total: 689
  - Density: 479.8/sq mi (185.26/km^{2})
- Time zone: UTC-6 (Central (CST))
  - Summer (DST): UTC-5 (CDT)
- ZIP Code: 65453 (Cuba)
- Area code: 573
- FIPS code: 29-35180
- GNIS feature ID: 2804684

Indian Lake is an unincorporated community and census-designated place (CDP) in Crawford County, Missouri, United States. It is in the northwestern part of the county, surrounding a lake of the same name, a reservoir on Brush Creek, a north-flowing tributary of the Bourbeuse River. The community is 5 miles (8 km) northwest of Cuba and Interstate 44.

Indian Lake was first listed as a CDP prior to the 2020 census.

== Demographics ==
Historical population
Census	Pop.	Note	%±
2020	689		—
U.S. Decennial Census

Indian Lake first appeared as a census designated place in the 2020 U.S. census.

== Education ==
It is in the Crawford County R-II School District.
