= Iron Center, Missouri =

Unincorporated community in Missouri, U.S.

Coordinates: 38°02′05″N 91°27′05″W

Iron Center is an unincorporated community in Crawford County, in the U.S. state of Missouri. The community was located adjacent to the railroad on what is now Missouri Route ZZ (old Route 66) approximately three miles southwest of Cuba.

Iron Center was a shipping point of iron, hence the name.
