= Union Township, Crawford County, Missouri =

Township in the US state of Missouri

Coordinates: 37.8372°N 91.4164°W

Union Township is a township in Crawford County, in the U.S. state of Missouri.

The township was previously known as Watkins Township sometime before 1870.
