= Meramec Township, Crawford County, Missouri =

Inactive township in the US state of Missouri

Coordinates: 37.9750°N 91.3914°W

Meramec Township is an inactive township in Crawford County, in the U.S. state of Missouri.

Meramec Township takes its name from the Meramec River. Its largest city is Steelville, which is also the county seat of Crawford County.
