= Wesco, Missouri =

Unincorporated community in Missouri, U.S.

Coordinates: 37°51′34″N 91°25′56″W

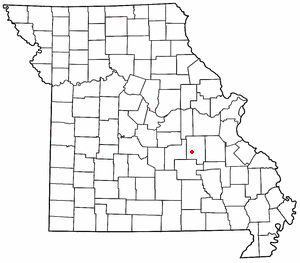

Wesco is an unincorporated community in southwest Crawford County, Missouri, United States. It is located on the Meramec River, approximately eight miles southwest of Steelville.

Wesco was first named Wilson's Mills, after James Wilson, the proprietor of a local mill. A post office called Wilsons Mills was established in 1877, and the name was changed to Wesco in 1907. The present name is a contraction of the Western Electric Supply Company, a telephone utility.
