= Argo, Missouri =

Unincorporated community in Missouri, U.S.

Coordinates: 38°11′02″N 91°19′50″W

Argo is an unincorporated community in northwest Crawford County, in the U.S. state of Missouri. The community is on a ridge northwest of the Little Bourbeuse River. The site is located on Missouri Route C about five miles northwest of Bourbon and Interstate 44.

== History ==
A post office called Argo was established in 1849, and discontinued in 1906. The community most likely was named after the mythological ship Argo.

In 1925, Argo had 24 inhabitants.
