= Courtois Township, Crawford County, Missouri =

Inactive township in the US state of Missouri

Coordinates: 37.9403°N 91.1883°W

Courtois Township is an inactive township in Crawford County, in the U.S. state of Missouri.

Courtois Township takes its name from Courtois Creek and is located in the Courtois Hills region of the Ozarks.
