= Czar, Missouri =

Unincorporated community in Missouri, U.S.

Coordinates: 37°45′11″N 91°07′06″W

Czar is an unincorporated community in southeastern Crawford County, in the U.S. state of Missouri. The community was located on the east side of Shoal Creek on Missouri Route Y, approximately four miles north of Viburnum. The Czar church and cemetery are about one-half mile northwest and the Czar Lookout Tower is on a ridge about one mile northeast on Route Y.

== History ==
A post office called Czar was established in 1889, and remained in operation until 1916. The origin of the name Czar is obscure.
