= White Creek (disambiguation) =

White Creek may refer to:

== Places ==
- White Creek, New York, a town in New York
- White Creek, Wisconsin, an unincorporated community

== Rivers ==
- White Creek (Chattahoochee River), a stream in Tennessee
- White Creek (Oriskany Creek tributary), a creek located in Oneida County, New York
- White Creek (Otsego Lake), a creek located in New York that flows into Otsego Lake

== See also ==
- Whites Creek (disambiguation)
