= Jake Prairie, Missouri =

Unincorporated community in Missouri, U.S.

Coordinates: 38°09′48″N 91°30′41″W

Jake Prairie is an unincorporated community in northwest Crawford County, in the U.S. state of Missouri. The community is located on Missouri Route F approximately eight miles northwest of Cuba.

== History ==
A post office called Jakes Prairie was established in 1875, and remained in operation until 1933. Tradition states the community was named after an Indian who lived near the site.
