= Missouri Route 68 =

State highway in Missouri, U.S.

Route 68

Route information
- Maintained by MoDOT
- Length: 40.845 mi (65.734 km)
- Existed: 1926–present

Major junctions
- West end: US 63 in Vichy
- I-44 / Route 8 in St. James
- East end: Route 19 / Route 32 / Route 72 in Salem

Location
- Country: United States
- State: Missouri

Highway system
- Missouri State Highway System; Interstate; US; State; Supplemental
← US 67	→ US 69

Route 68 is a highway in central and southern Missouri. Its eastern (or southern) terminus is at Route 19 in Salem; its western (or northern) terminus is at U.S. Route 63 north of Rolla. Even though it is an even- numbered route, it tends to run more north–south than east–west.

Between its northern terminus and St. James, Route 68 was Route 65 from 1922 to 1926, and has since been extended to the south.

== Route description ==
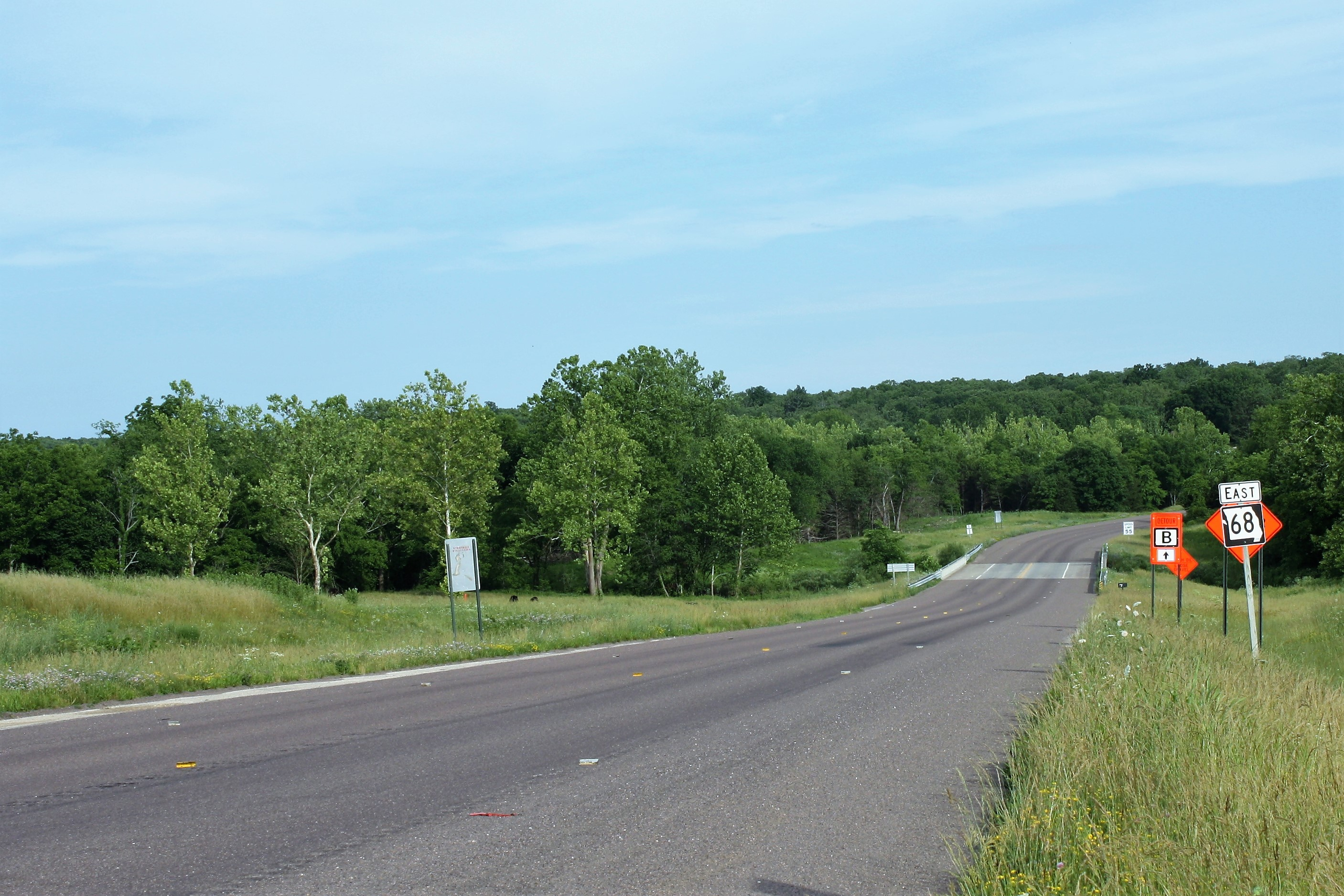
First Route 68 reassurance marker south of the junction with Route H in Maries County

== Major intersections ==
County	Location	mi	km	Destinations	Notes
Maries	Vichy	0.000	0.000	US 63 – Vienna, Rolla	
Phelps	St. James	12.301	19.797	I-44 – Rolla, St. Louis Route 8 begins	Northern end of Route 8 overlap
Phelps	Meramec Township	17.035	27.415	Route 8 east – Steelville	Southern end of Route 8 overlap
Dent	Salem	39.323	63.284	Route 19 north – Steelville	Northern end of Route 19 overlap
Dent	Salem	40.845	65.734	Route 19 south (Main Street) to Route 32 / Route 72 – Licking, Boss, Eminence	Southern end of Route 19 overlap
1.000 mi = 1.609 km; 1.000 km = 0.621 mi: Concurrency terminus
