= Huzzah, Missouri =

Unincorporated community in Missouri, U.S.

- Unincorporated community
- Location in the state of Missouri
- Coordinates: 37°54′15″N 91°09′26″W
- Country: U. S. A.
- State: Missouri
- County: Crawford County
- Elevation: 227 m (745 ft)
- Time zone: UTC-6 (CST)
  - Summer (DST): UTC-5 (CDT)
- GNIS feature ID: 750437

Huzzah is an unincorporated community in eastern Crawford County, Missouri, United States. It is located 11.6 miles (18.7 km) southeast of Steelville in the Mark Twain National Forest.

A post office called Huzzah was established in 1898, and remained in operation until 1967. The community takes its name from nearby Huzzah Creek.
