= West Sullivan, Missouri =

- Village
- Interactive map of West Sullivan, Missouri
- Coordinates: 38°11′31″N 91°11′30″W
- Country: United States
- State: Missouri
- County: Crawford

Area
  - Total: 0.36 sq mi (0.94 km^{2})
  - Land: 0.36 sq mi (0.94 km^{2})
  - Water: 0 sq mi (0.00 km^{2})
- Elevation: 974 ft (297 m)

Population (2020)
  - Total: 285
  - Density: 782.6/sq mi (302.18/km^{2})
- ZIP code: 63080 and 65441
- FIPS code: 29-79000
- GNIS feature ID: 2400145

West Sullivan is a village on former U.S. Route 66 in northern Crawford County, Missouri, United States. The community was incorporated in 2000. The population was 119 at the 2010 census.

== Geography ==
The community lies adjacent to Interstate 44 on the east and south of Missouri Route WW. The village limits are between Sullivan to the northeast and St. Cloud to the southwest.

According to the United States Census Bureau, the village has a total area of 0.36 square miles (0.93 km^{2}), all land.

== Demographics ==
Historical population
Census	Pop.	Note	%±
2010	119		—
2020	285		139.5%
U.S. Decennial Census

=== 2010 census ===
As of the census of 2010, there were 119 people, 41 households, and 31 families residing in the village. The population density was 330.6 inhabitants per square mile (127.6/km^{2}). There were 49 housing units at an average density of 136.1 per square mile (52.5/km^{2}). The racial makeup of the village was 98.32% White and 1.68% from other races. Hispanic or Latino of any race were 1.68% of the population.

There were 41 households, of which 46.3% had children under the age of 18 living with them, 56.1% were married couples living together, 17.1% had a female householder with no husband present, 2.4% had a male householder with no wife present, and 24.4% were non-families. 19.5% of all households were made up of individuals, and 9.8% had someone living alone who was 65 years of age or older. The average household size was 2.90 and the average family size was 3.26.

The median age in the village was 31.5 years. 34.5% of residents were under the age of 18; 8.4% were between the ages of 18 and 24; 26.9% were from 25 to 44; 23.5% were from 45 to 64; and 6.7% were 65 years of age or older. The gender makeup of the village was 47.1% male and 52.9% female.

== Education ==
West Sullivan is divided between Crawford County R-I School District and Sullivan C-2 School District.
