= Knobview Township, Crawford County, Missouri =

Inactive township in the US state of Missouri

Coordinates: 38.0617°N 91.5031°W

Knobview Township is an inactive township in Crawford County, in the U.S. state of Missouri. It contains the census-designated place of Indian Lake.

Knobview Township took its name from the community of Rosati, Missouri, formerly called Knobview.

It has a population of 1,813, and its residents tend to be politically conservative.
