= Westover, Missouri =

Unincorporated community in Missouri

Coordinates: 37°55′21″N 91°13′41″W

Westover is an unincorporated community in Crawford County, in the U.S. state of Missouri. The community is on Dry Creek at the end of Missouri Route BB, approximately seven miles south-southeast of Steelville and five miles northeast of Cherryville.

The community has a fish hatchery on Dry Creek which is supported by the Westover Springs that arise within the Dry Creek valley to the south of the community.

== History ==
A post office called Westover was established in 1901, and remained in operation until 1927. The community was named after J. I. H. Westover, the proprietor of a local mill.
