= Oak Hill, Missouri =

Unincorporated community in Missouri, U.S.

Coordinates: 38°12′21″N 91°25′15″W

Oak Hill is an unincorporated community in northwest Crawford County, in the U.S. state of Missouri. The community is located on the east bank of Brush Creek, one-quarter mile south of the Crawford-Gasconade county line and is on Missouri Route CC, one mile east of Missouri Route 19.

== History ==
The community of Oak Hill had its start circa 1860, and was likely named for the character of the local terrain. A post office called Oak Hill was established in 1870, and remained in operation until 1944.
