= Dillard, Missouri =

Unincorporated community in Missouri, U.S.

Coordinates: 37°44′12″N 91°12′15″W

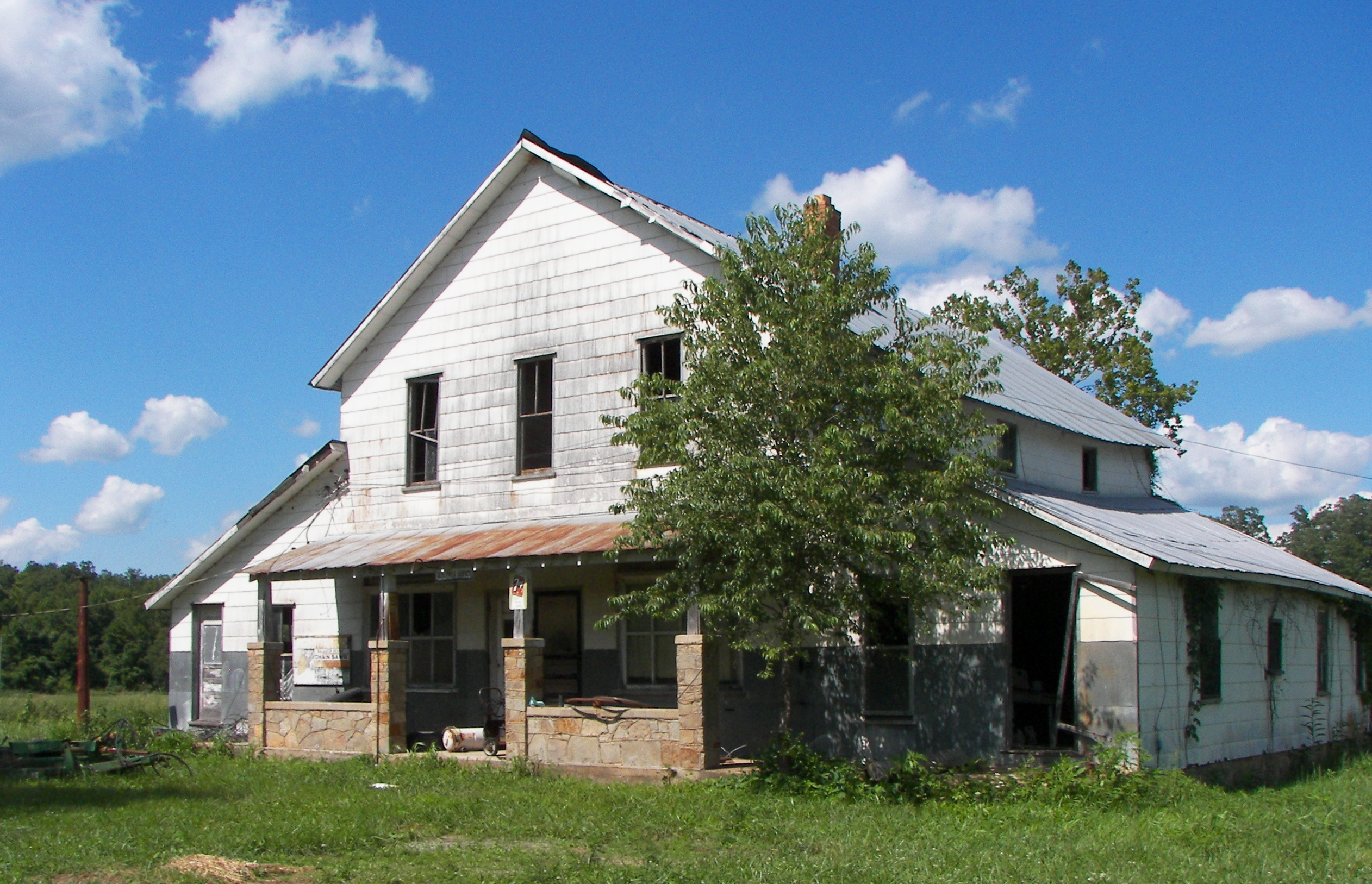
This building formerly served as the local post office in Dillard.

Dillard is an unincorporated community in southern Crawford County, Missouri, United States. It is located on Huzzah Creek and Missouri Route 49, approximately 22 miles south of Steelville in the Mark Twain National Forest. The Dillard Mill State Historic Site lies about one mile south of the community at the confluence of Indian Creek with Huzzah Creek.

A post office called Dillard was established in 1886, and remained in operation until 1976. The community was named after Joseph Dillard Cottrell, proprietor of nearby Dillard Mill.
