= Cherry Valley National Wildlife Refuge =

National Wildlife Refuge in Pennsylvania, US

- IUCN category IV (habitat/species management area)
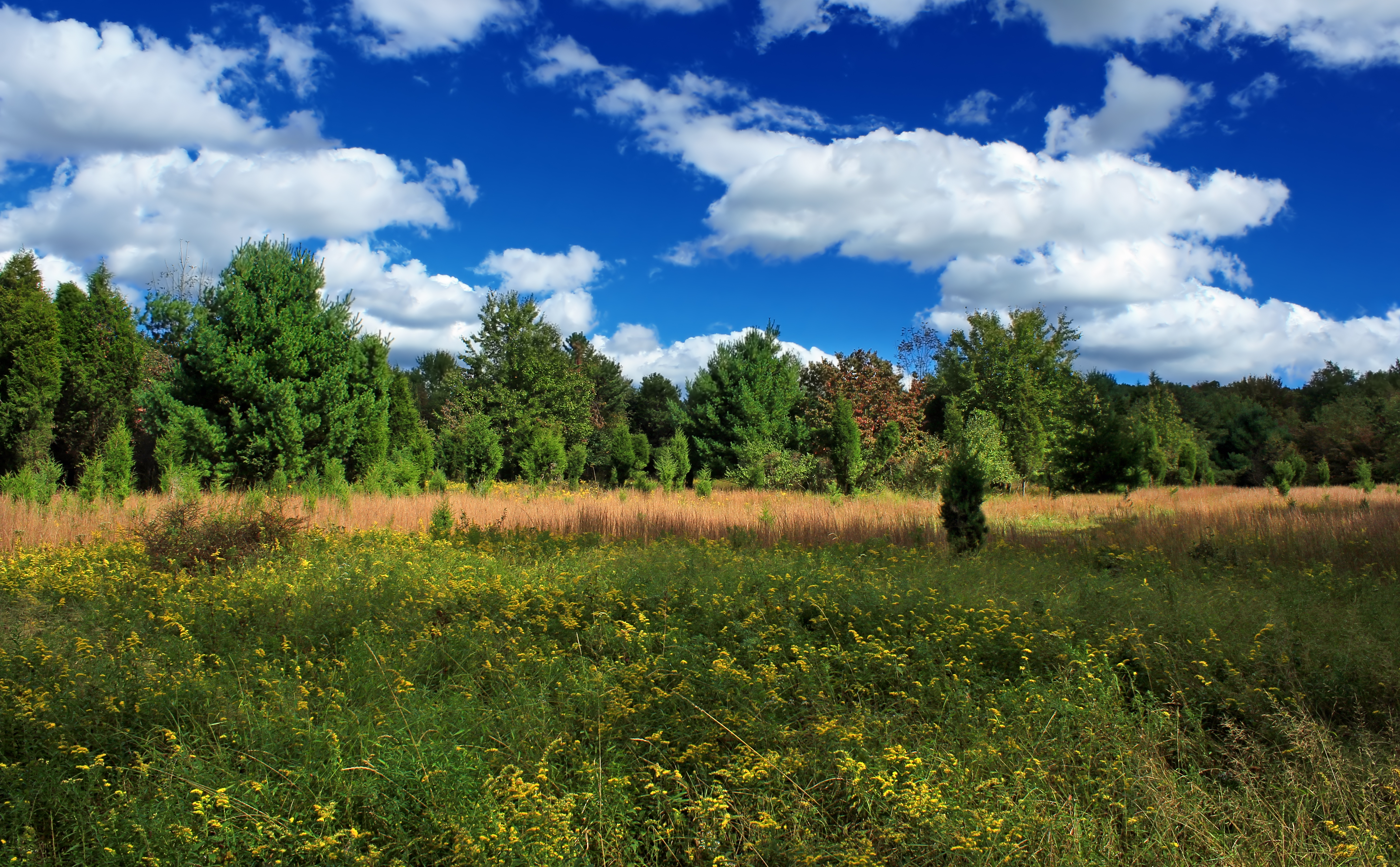

- Location within Pennsylvania Location within the United States
- Location: Monroe County, Pennsylvania, United States
- Nearest city: Wind Gap, Pennsylvania
- Coordinates: 40.8811°N 75.3073°W
- Area: 185 acres (0.75 km^{2})
- Established: 2008
- Governing body: U.S. Fish and Wildlife Service
- Website: Cherry Valley National Wildlife Refuge

The Cherry Valley National Wildlife Refuge is a National Wildlife Refuge in Monroe County, Pennsylvania.

Pennsylvania’s Cherry Valley is rich in natural resources and wildlife diversity. Cherry Creek flows through southern Monroe County in northeastern Pennsylvania, flowing into the Delaware River. For generations, local landowners and conservation organizations safeguarded the valley’s clean waters and important natural communities. Recent rapid residential and commercial growth in Monroe County, however, has outpaced efforts to protect these resources. The county is within a two-hour drive of millions of people.

In December 2008, the Director of the U.S. Fish and Wildlife Service approved the establishment of the Cherry Valley National Wildlife Refuge in Monroe County, Pennsylvania after a Finding of No Significant Impact (FONSI) was issued by the Northeast Regional Director.

== Habitat ==
The 30,000-acre valley harbors nationally significant ecosystems and many protected plant and animals, including federally listed threatened or endangered species. The Kittatinny Ridge, following the creek’s path, is a major avenue for migrating birds of prey, songbirds, waterfowl and bats.

According to the A. W. Kuchler U.S. potential natural vegetation types, Cherry Valley National Wildlife Refuge would have a dominant vegetation type of Appalachian Oak (104) with a dominant vegetation form of Eastern Hardwood Forest (25).

== Wildlife ==
Federal Trust Species in Cherry Valley: American eel, bald eagle, Northeastern bulrush, dwarf wedge mussel, spreading globeflower.

Mammalian species that roam in this refuge are black bear, coyote, white-tailed deer, squirrel, raccoon, beaver, fox, river otter, woodchuck, bobcat, skunk, opossum and muskrat.

== Climate ==
According to the Trewartha climate classification system, Cherry Valley National Wildlife Refuge has a Temperate Continental climate (Dc) with warm summers (b), cold winters (0) and year-around precipitation. Dcbo climates are characterized by at least one month having an average mean temperature ≤ 32.0 °F (0 °C), four to seven months with an average mean temperature ≥ 50.0 °F (10 °C), all months with an average mean temperature < 72.0 °F (22 °C) and no significant precipitation difference between seasons. Although summers are typically comfortably humid at Cherry Valley National Wildlife Refuge, episodes of heat and high humidity can occur with heat index values > 94 °F (34 °C). Since 1981, the highest air temperature was 98.0 °F (37 °C) on 07/22/2011, and the highest average mean dew point was 71.6 °F (22 °C) on 08/28/2018. The annual peak in thunderstorm activity occurs in the month of July. Since 1981, the wettest calendar day was 6.20 inches (157 mm) on 10/08/2005. During the winter months, the plant hardiness zone is 6a with an average annual extreme minimum air temperature of −9.0 °F (−23 °C). Since 1981, the coldest air temperature was −18.5 °F (−28 °C) on 01/21/1994. Episodes of extreme cold and wind can occur with wind chill values < −21 °F (−29 °C). Ice storms and large snowstorms depositing ≥ 12 inches (30 cm) are somewhat frequent, particularly during nor’easters from December through February.

Climate data for Cherry Valley National Wildlife Refuge. 1981-2010 Averages (1981-2018 Records).
Month	Jan	Feb	Mar	Apr	May	Jun	Jul	Aug	Sep	Oct	Nov	Dec	Year
Record high °F (°C)	66.0 (18.9)	74.9 (23.8)	83.5 (28.6)	91.0 (32.8)	91.9 (33.3)	92.2 (33.4)	98.0 (36.7)	96.1 (35.6)	94.0 (34.4)	86.3 (30.2)	76.5 (24.7)	68.9 (20.5)	98.0 (36.7)
Mean daily maximum °F (°C)	31.6 (−0.2)	35.0 (1.7)	43.8 (6.6)	56.7 (13.7)	67.3 (19.6)	75.0 (23.9)	79.4 (26.3)	77.6 (25.3)	70.8 (21.6)	59.2 (15.1)	47.6 (8.7)	35.6 (2.0)	56.7 (13.7)
Daily mean °F (°C)	23.7 (−4.6)	26.3 (−3.2)	34.3 (1.3)	46.3 (7.9)	56.4 (13.6)	64.7 (18.2)	69.1 (20.6)	67.7 (19.8)	60.8 (16.0)	49.5 (9.7)	39.6 (4.2)	28.3 (−2.1)	47.3 (8.5)
Mean daily minimum °F (°C)	15.8 (−9.0)	17.6 (−8.0)	24.9 (−3.9)	35.9 (2.2)	45.4 (7.4)	54.4 (12.4)	58.9 (14.9)	57.9 (14.4)	50.7 (10.4)	39.7 (4.3)	31.5 (−0.3)	20.9 (−6.2)	37.9 (3.3)
Record low °F (°C)	−18.5 (−28.1)	−8.0 (−22.2)	−0.4 (−18.0)	14.4 (−9.8)	29.5 (−1.4)	36.6 (2.6)	42.0 (5.6)	37.7 (3.2)	30.8 (−0.7)	19.9 (−6.7)	6.2 (−14.3)	−6.3 (−21.3)	−18.5 (−28.1)
Average precipitation inches (mm)	3.66 (93)	3.18 (81)	3.88 (99)	4.38 (111)	4.51 (115)	4.94 (125)	4.78 (121)	4.30 (109)	5.08 (129)	4.93 (125)	4.21 (107)	4.20 (107)	52.05 (1,322)
Average relative humidity (%)	72.0	66.9	62.5	60.3	63.3	70.8	70.5	73.7	74.1	72.1	71.9	73.1	69.3
Average dew point °F (°C)	16.0 (−8.9)	16.8 (−8.4)	22.8 (−5.1)	33.3 (0.7)	44.1 (6.7)	55.0 (12.8)	59.1 (15.1)	59.0 (15.0)	52.5 (11.4)	40.9 (4.9)	31.3 (−0.4)	20.8 (−6.2)	37.7 (3.2)
Source: PRISM
