= Vilander, Missouri =

Extinct town in the U.S. state of Missouri

Coordinates: 38°05′47″N 91°07′54″W

Vilander is an extinct town in eastern Crawford County, in the U.S. state of Missouri. The GNIS classifies it as a populated place.

The town site lies on the south bank of Brazil Creek about two miles upstream (southeast) of that stream's confluence with the Meramec River. Anthonies Mill lies 2.5 miles upstream in adjacent Washington County.

A post office called Vilander was established in 1885, and remained in operation until 1920. An early postmaster gave the community the middle name of her husband, Calvin Vilander Lynch.
