= Harrison Mills, Missouri =

Unincorporated community in Missouri, U.S.

Coordinates: 38°04′49″N 91°08′48″W

Harrison Mills is an unincorporated community in Crawford County, in the U.S. state of Missouri.

== History ==
A post office called Harrison's Mills was established in 1832, and remained in operation until 1880. B. Harrison, an early postmaster, gave the community his last name.
