= Dillard Mill State Historic Site =

Historic site in Missouri, United States

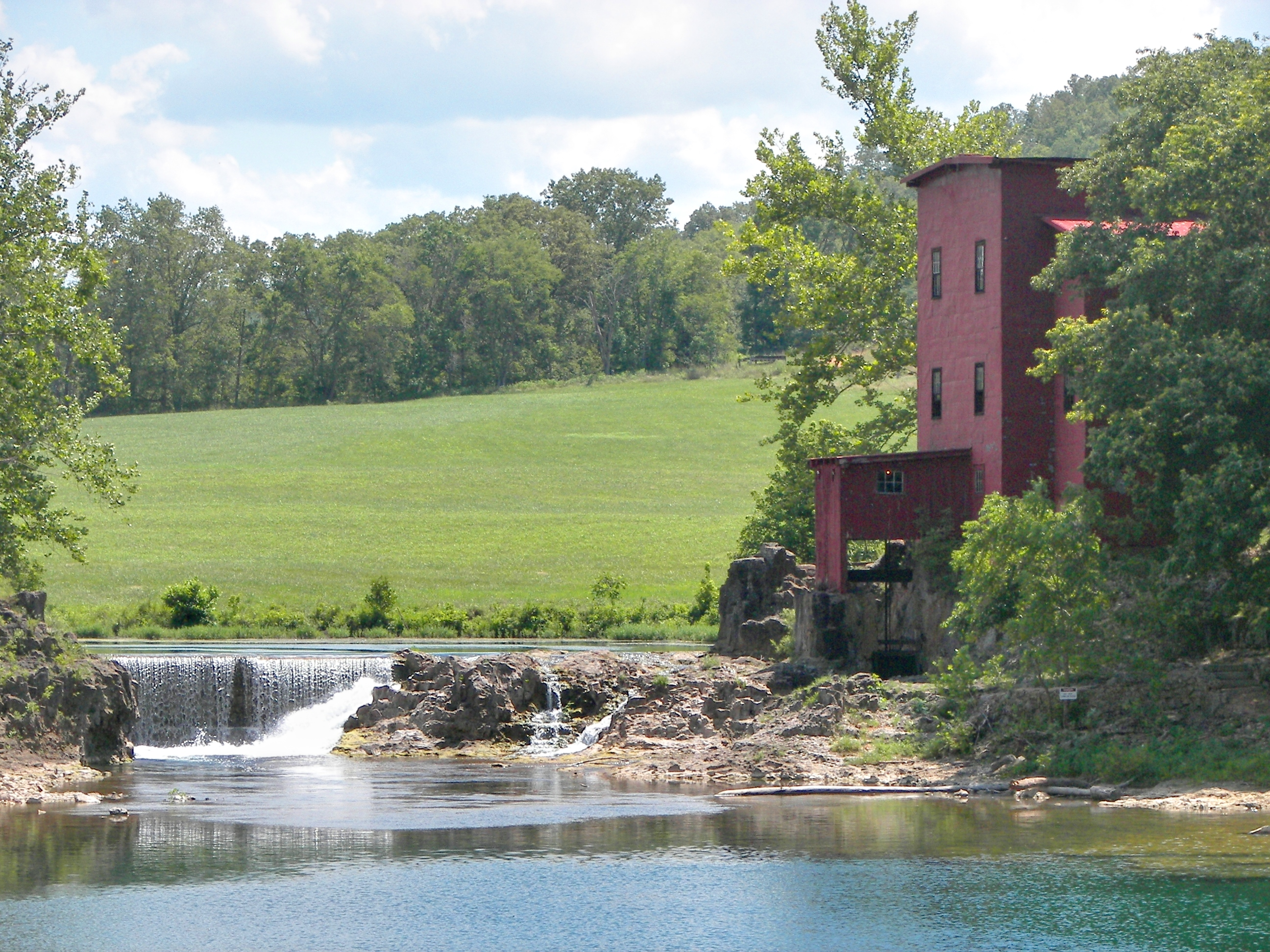

- Location within Missouri Location within the United States
- Location: Crawford County, Missouri, United States
- Coordinates: 37°43′03″N 91°12′24″W
- Area: 131.77 acres (53.33 ha)
- Elevation: 906 ft (276 m)
- Established: 1977
- Visitors: 23,331 (in 2022)
- Governing body: Missouri Department of Natural Resources
- Website: Dillard Mill State Historic Site
- Dillard Mill Historic District
- U.S. National Register of Historic Places
- U.S. Historic district
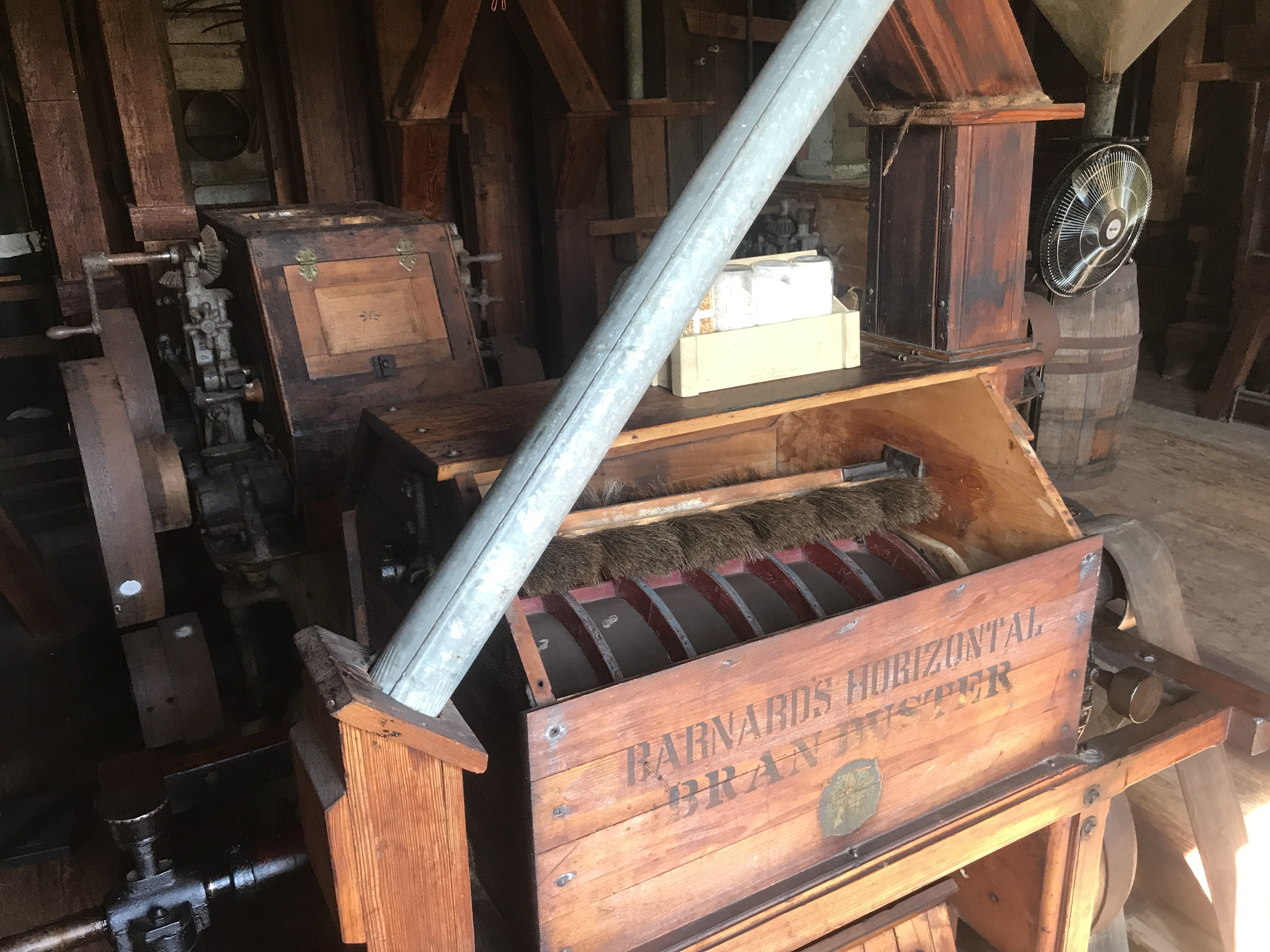
- The mill's still working Barnard's Horizontal Bran Duster
- Location: 142 Dillard Mill Rd., near Davisville, Missouri
- Area: 58 acres (23 ha)
- Built by: Adams, Jacob; Mischke, Emil; Klemme, Lester
- Architectural style: I-house, Bungalow
- NRHP reference No.: 14001157
- Added to NRHP: January 14, 2015

The Dillard Mill State Historic Site is a privately owned, state-administered property on Huzzah Creek in Crawford County, Missouri, that preserves a water-powered gristmill. The 132-acre (53 ha) site has been operated as a state historic site by the Missouri Department of Natural Resources under a lease agreement with the L-A-D Foundation since 1975. The site was listed on the National Register of Historic Places in 2015.

== History ==
A mill was built on Huzzah Creek in 1853 by Francis Wisdom and it was known as the Wisdom Mill. It was destroyed by fire in 1895. The property changed hands, and a new mill, the Mische Mill, was built in 1908. The Mische Mill used an underwater turbine rather than the old waterwheel, and the owners altered the course of the stream and the bluff at the site. The mill was in operation until 1956. It was renamed the Dillard Mill in 1975 when the state took over management of the property. It was dedicated as a historic site in 1977. Restoration of the mill was completed in 1980.

== See also ==
- National Register of Historic Places listings in Crawford County, Missouri
