= Anthonies Mill, Missouri =

Unincorporated community in Missouri, U.S.

Coordinates: 38°04′47″N 91°05′10″W

Anthonies Mill is an unincorporated community in Washington County, in the U.S. state of Missouri. The community is located at the confluence of Ashley Branch with Brazil Creek on the western border of the county. The site is at the junction of routes N and W. The old community of Vilander lies in Crawford County just 2.5 miles downstream to the west.

== History ==
A post office called Anthonies Mill was established in 1901, and remained in operation until 1955. The community has the name of Jonas M. Anthony, the proprietor of a local gristmill.

In 1925, Anthonies Mill had 26 inhabitants.
