= Cherry Valley O-scale =

American model railroading club

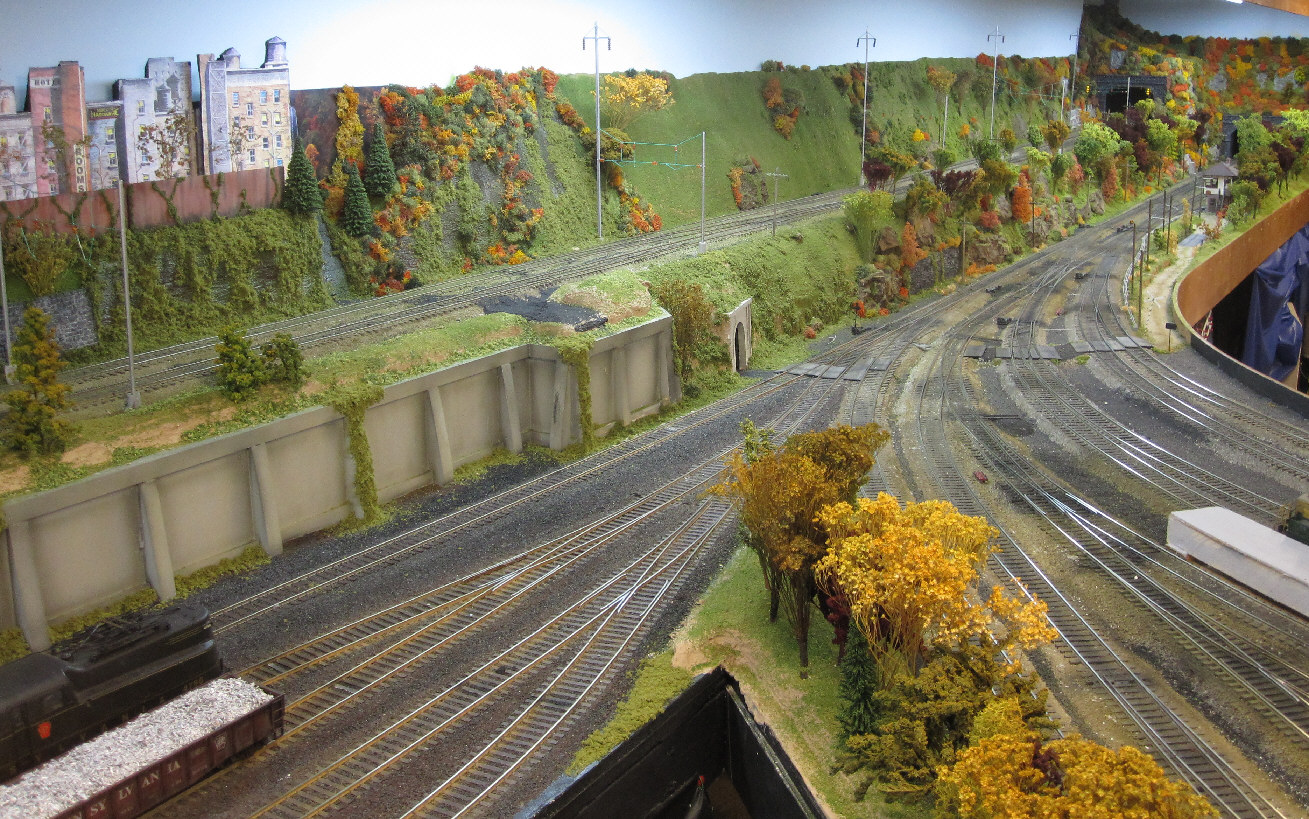
Part of the passenger station throat on the new layout

Cherry Valley O Scale is a not-for-profit club dedicated to the promotion of 2-rail O-scale (1:48) model railroading, located in Merchantville, New Jersey, United States, in the basement/undercroft of the Grace Episcopal Church.

== History ==
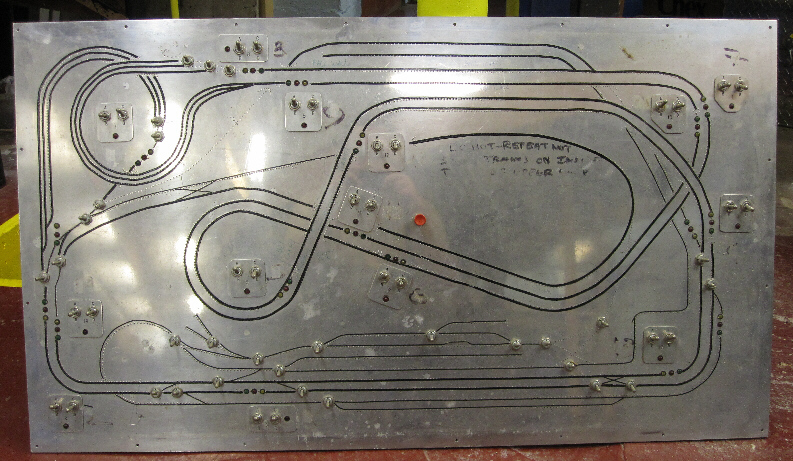
Control panel from the old layout

The club was started in March 1962, by members of the former Philadelphia Model Railroad Club, which had been located in the B&O passenger station on Chestnut St. in Philadelphia, after the B&O station was demolished (some members of the PMRC also went on to start the East Penn Traction Club several years later).

When first started, the space was an 80' x 35' unfinished crawl space directly under the original 1890s chapel. Finishing the space took weeks, with the removal of 4' of dirt before 20 cubic yards of concrete was used for the new floor. The first layout in the space was started in July 1962, with the framing and scenery built before the track was laid, and the first spike driven on August 30, 1962. This layout was 27 by 55 feet in size, and was of a double-track folded dogbone design, built with traditional square tabletop framing, plaster scenery, and relay control. Eventually it grew to have over 4000 linear feet of track, in both standard and 3-foot gauges, with some dual gauge mixed in.

It existed through to January 1999, when it was torn down due to growing problems with accessibility and electrical characteristics. Many of the original structures and switches have been saved, for eventual inclusion on the new layout. Most notable of these is a 1940s train station model which had previously been salvaged from the layout at the PMRC location on Chestnut Street.

In 2012, the club's 50th anniversary was celebrated with a proclamation of the Merchantville Town Council, at their October public session.

== New layout ==
The new layout was started in 2001, is of a double-track looped-8 design; but has been built around the walls, with several reversing loops, curved laminate benchwork, more than 2000 linear feet of track, and a scale model of Philadelphia's 30th Street Station. Scenery has been built with a mix of hydrocal and extruded styrofoam board, and North Coast Engineering (NCE) Digital Command Control has been installed to allow running of multiple trains without the need for complex relay systems. The layout also features working signals that display proper occupancy, as well as scale-sized lighting fixtures for night scenes.

A new On30 narrow gauge branchline is being constructed at one end of the layout, with plans to expand it as time and resources allow. Rolling stock is owned by the individual members, with the club jointly owning the layout and control system. This rolling stock represents all periods of history, and is a mixture of brass, bronze, tin, white metal, plastic, resin, wood, paper, cardboard, and die-cast models; most of which has been extensively kitbashed/modified, features custom paint and water-slide decals; and has been weathered to better replicate real-world conditions.

== Catenary ==
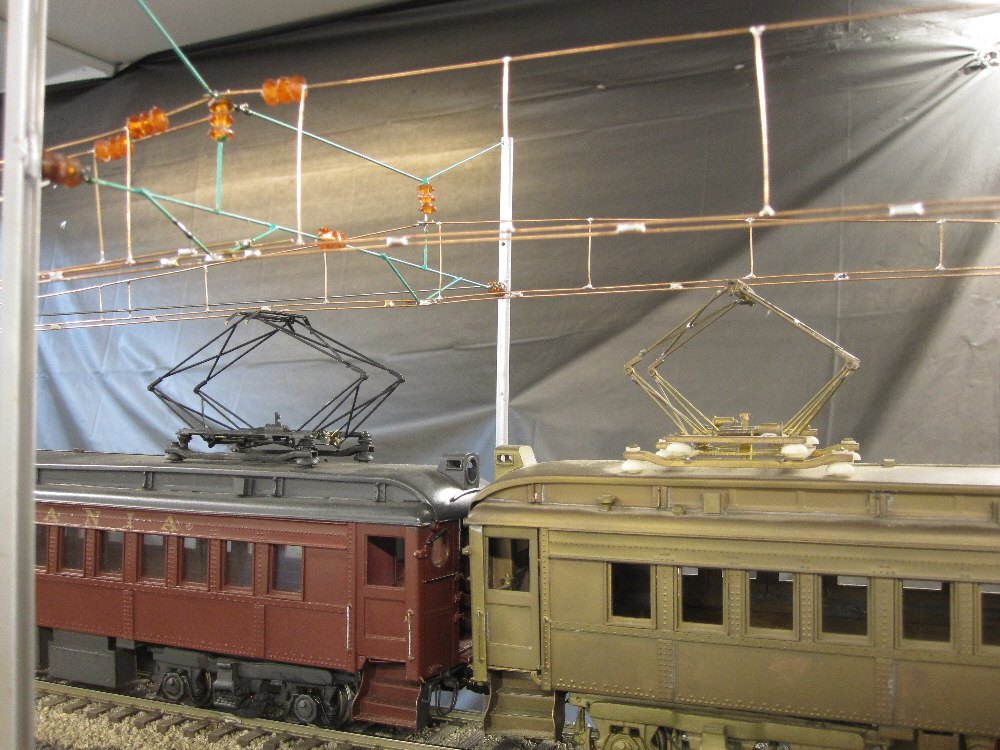
PRR-style compound catenary being installed on new layout

Although the original layout did have a short section of catenary, most of it was destroyed when the layout was torn down. However, the new layout is being constructed with a full PRR-Style compound catenary system over the entire layout. This catenary system is being integrated into the power distribution, so that the electric locomotives and MU cars will receive power via their operating pantographs.

== Board of directors ==
The club is governed by president, vice president, treasurer, and secretary. All officers serve, on a voluntary basis, as the organization's Board of Directors.

== Meetings ==
Meetings are held each Tuesday evening. Business meetings are typically held on the second Tuesday of the month.

== Open House events ==
Every year, the club traditionally has several "Open House" weekends near the end of the year. Some years in conjunction with the Merchantville annual Christmas parade and Tree Lighting ceremony. The first such Open House weekends were held Friday and Saturday, November 9–10 and 16-17, 1962. Current open house schedule is usually the first weekend(s) in December and January. Additional date(s) is during the church's annual fall festival. Admission is free (donations appreciated).

== O-scale Swap Meet events ==
The Club formerly held two O-scale-only "Swap Meets" a year, usually on a single first Saturday in both March and October. Admission was charged to the Dealer's Hall, and included a tour of the club layout. Meets were discountinued after 2016.

== Membership ==
Club membership is open to everyone over the age of 18 with an interest in scale model railroading. Prior experience is encouraged. Annual dues is $150.00. New members have a six-month probation period to fulfill for consideration as full membership.
