= Davisville, Missouri =

Unincorporated community in Missouri, U.S.

Coordinates: 37°48′28″N 91°11′06″W

Davisville is an Unincorporated community in southeastern Crawford County, Missouri, United States. It is located in the Mark Twain National Forest, approximately 13 miles southeast of Steelville.

A post office called Davisville has been in operation since 1880. The community bears the name of the local Davis family, who were instrumental in securing the town a post office.

The Dillard Mill Historic District was listed on the National Register of Historic Places in 2015.
