= Brazil Creek =

Stream in the U.S. state of Missouri

Brazil Creek is a stream in Crawford and Washington counties in the U.S. state of Missouri. It is a tributary to the Meramec River.

The stream headwaters are at 37°59′50″N 90°59′10″W in Washington County and its confluence with the Meramec River is at 38°07′21″N 91°08′59″W in Crawford County.

The stream flows past the communities of Anthonies Mill in western Washington County and Vilander in eastern Crawford County.

According to the State Historical Society of Missouri, the source of the name of Brazil Creek is obscure.

== See also ==
- List of rivers of Missouri
