= Missouri Route 19 =

State highway in Missouri, U.S.

Route 19

Route information
- Maintained by MoDOT
- Length: 262.825 mi (422.976 km)
- Existed: 1922–present

Major junctions
- North end: US 61 (Avenue of the Saints) in New London
- US 54 near Laddonia; I-70 / US 40 near New Florence; US 50 in Drake; I-44 in Cuba; US 60 in Winona; US 160 in Alton
- South end: US 63 in Thayer

Location
- Country: United States
- State: Missouri

Highway system
- Missouri State Highway System; Interstate; US; State; Supplemental
← Route 18	→ Route 20

Route 19 is a long state highway in Missouri. Its northern terminus is at U.S. Route 61 in New London and its southern terminus is at U.S. Route 63 on the north side of Thayer. Route 19 is one of Missouri's original 1922 highways, though it initially had a northern terminus at Route 14 (now Interstate 44) in Cuba and was later extended north.

== Route description ==
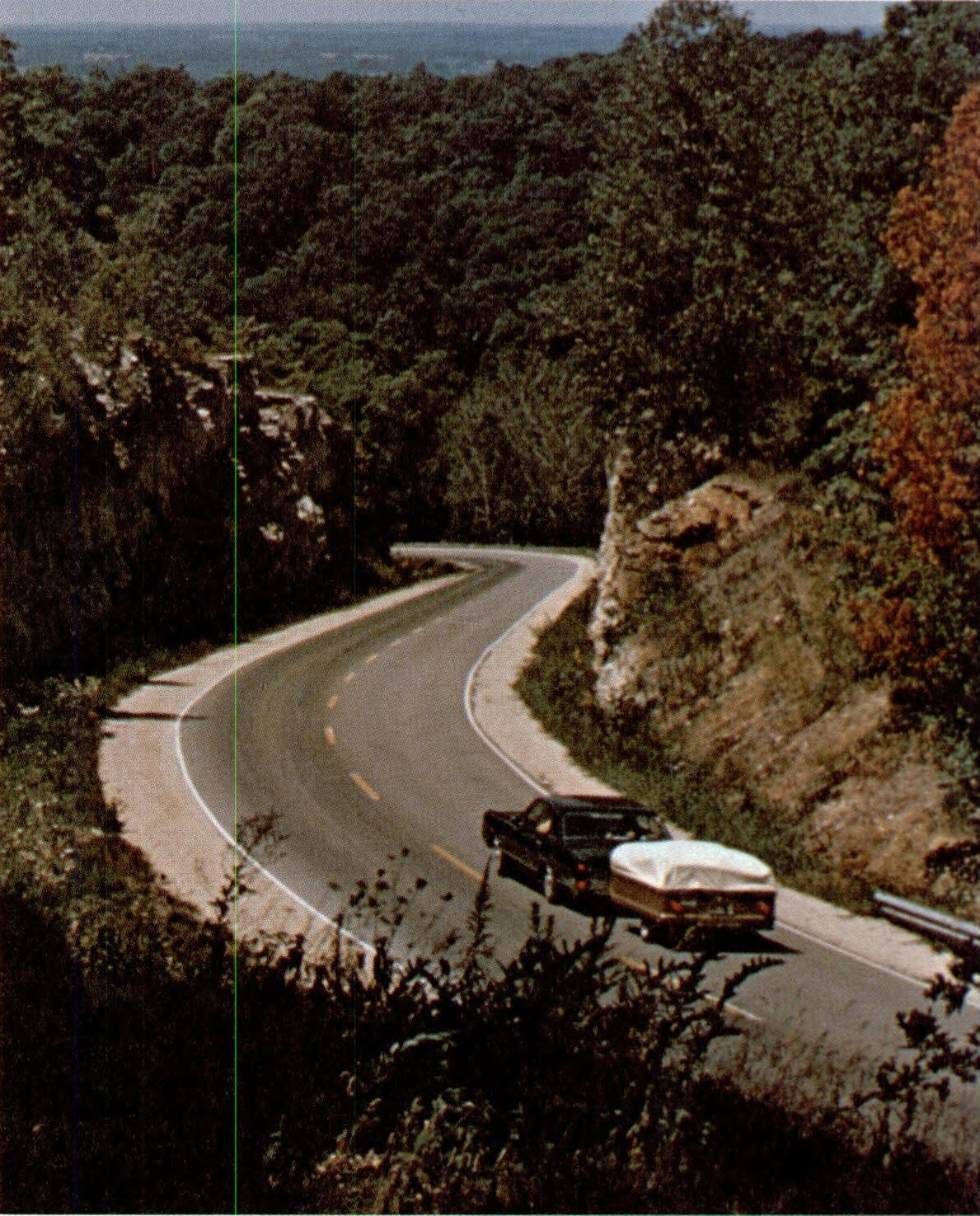
Route 19 in 1977

Route 19 begins at U.S. Route 61 in New London. It then travels mainly south, forming an 8-mile concurrency with U.S. Route 54, 3 miles west of Farber. The highway intersects Interstate 70 near New Florence. It crosses the Missouri River on the Christopher S. Bond Bridge at Hermann. There is a concurrency with Missouri Route 100 through Hermann. It then forms a brief 1 mile concurrency with U.S. Route 50 at Drake. Through Owensville there is a concurrency with Route 28. The highway intersects Interstate 44 at Cuba. South of Cuba, the highway is designated as a scenic highway. It forms a concurrency with Route 8 through Steelville. It passes through the Ozark National Scenic Riverways and portions of the Mark Twain National Forest. The highway overlaps U.S. Route 60 in Winona and U.S. Route 160 in Alton. The highway terminates at U.S. Route 63 in Thayer.

== History ==
The part from Drake north to US 54 east of Mexico was Route 45 from 1922 until about 1930.

== Major intersections ==
County	Location	mi	km	Destinations	Notes
Oregon	Thayer	0.000	0.000	US 63 / US 63 Bus. south – Thayer, Koshkonong	
Oregon	Alton	15.218	24.491	US 160 east – Doniphan	Southern end of US 160 overlap
Oregon	Alton	15.389	24.766	US 160 west – West Plains	Northern end of US 160 overlap
Shannon	Winona	41.268	66.414	US 60 west – Birch Tree	Southern end of US 60 overlap
Shannon	Winona	42.073	67.710	US 60 east – Fremont	Northern end of US 60 overlap
Shannon	Eminence	53.961	86.842	Route 106	
Dent	Salem	96.476	155.263	Route 32 / Route 72 – Licking, Boss Route 68 begins	Southern end of Route 68 overlap
Dent	Salem	97.998	157.712	Route 68 west – St. James	Northern end of Route 68 overlap
Dent		110.376	177.633	Route 117 south	
Crawford	Cherryville	121.366	195.320	Route 49 south – Davisville, Viburnum, Dillard Mill State Historic Site	
Crawford	Steelville	131.428	211.513	Route 8 east – Potosi	Southern end of Route 8 overlap
Crawford	Steelville	132.104	212.601	Route 8 west – St. James	Northern end of Route 8 overlap
Crawford	Cuba	139.215	224.045	Route ZZ west (Washington Street / Historic Route 66) – Fanning	
Crawford	Cuba	139.955	225.236	I-44 – Rolla, Sullivan, St. Louis	I-44 exit 208
Gasconade	Owensville	160.265	257.922	Route 28 west – Bland	Southern end of Route 28 overlap
Gasconade	Owensville	161.305	259.595	Route 28 east – Rosebud	Northern end of Route 28 overlap
Gasconade		169.334	272.517	US 50 east – Rosebud	Southern end of US 50 overlap
Gasconade	Drake	169.927	273.471	US 50 west – Mount Sterling	Northern end of US 50 overlap
Gasconade	Hermann	188.022	302.592	Route 100 west / Lewis and Clark Trail west – Gasconade	Southern end of Route 100 / Lewis and Clark Trail overlap. Access to Hermann Area District Hospital
Gasconade	Hermann	188.870	303.957	Route 100 east / Lewis and Clark Trail east – Washington	Northern end of Route 100 / Lewis and Clark Trail overlap
Montgomery		190.451	306.501	Route 94 / Lewis and Clark Trail – Rhineland, Treloar	
Montgomery		204.379	328.916	I-70 / US 40 – Danville, Columbia, Jonesburg, St. Louis	I-70 exit 175
Montgomery	Montgomery City	210.551	338.849	Route 161 south – Danville	Southern end of Route 161 overlap
Montgomery	Montgomery City	210.626	338.970	Route 161 north – Middletown	Northern end of Route 161 overlap
Audrain	Scotts Corner	227.636	366.345	US 54 west / Route BB east – Mexico, Middletown	Southern end of US 54 overlap
Audrain	Bassinger Corner	235.792	379.470	US 54 east / Route J west – Vandalia	Northern end of US 54 overlap
Ralls		240.773	387.487	Route 154 east	Southern end of Route 154 overlap
Ralls		246.107	396.071	Route 154 west – Perry	Northern end of Route 154 overlap
Ralls		262.825	422.976	US 61 (Avenue of the Saints) / US 61 Bus. north – Hannibal, Bowling Green	Interchange
1.000 mi = 1.609 km; 1.000 km = 0.621 mi

== See also ==
- List of state highways in Missouri
