= Whites Creek (Eleven Point River tributary) =

Stream in the American state of Missouri

Whites Creek is a stream in Carter and Oregon counties in the Ozarks of southern Missouri. It is a tributary of the Eleven Point River.

The stream headwaters are at 36°50′11″N 91°11′13″W and the confluence with the Eleven Point is at 36°43′29″N 91°12′39″W.

Whites Creek has the name of the local White family.

== See also ==
- List of rivers of Missouri
