= Fanning, Missouri =

Unincorporated community in Missouri, U.S.

- Unincorporated community
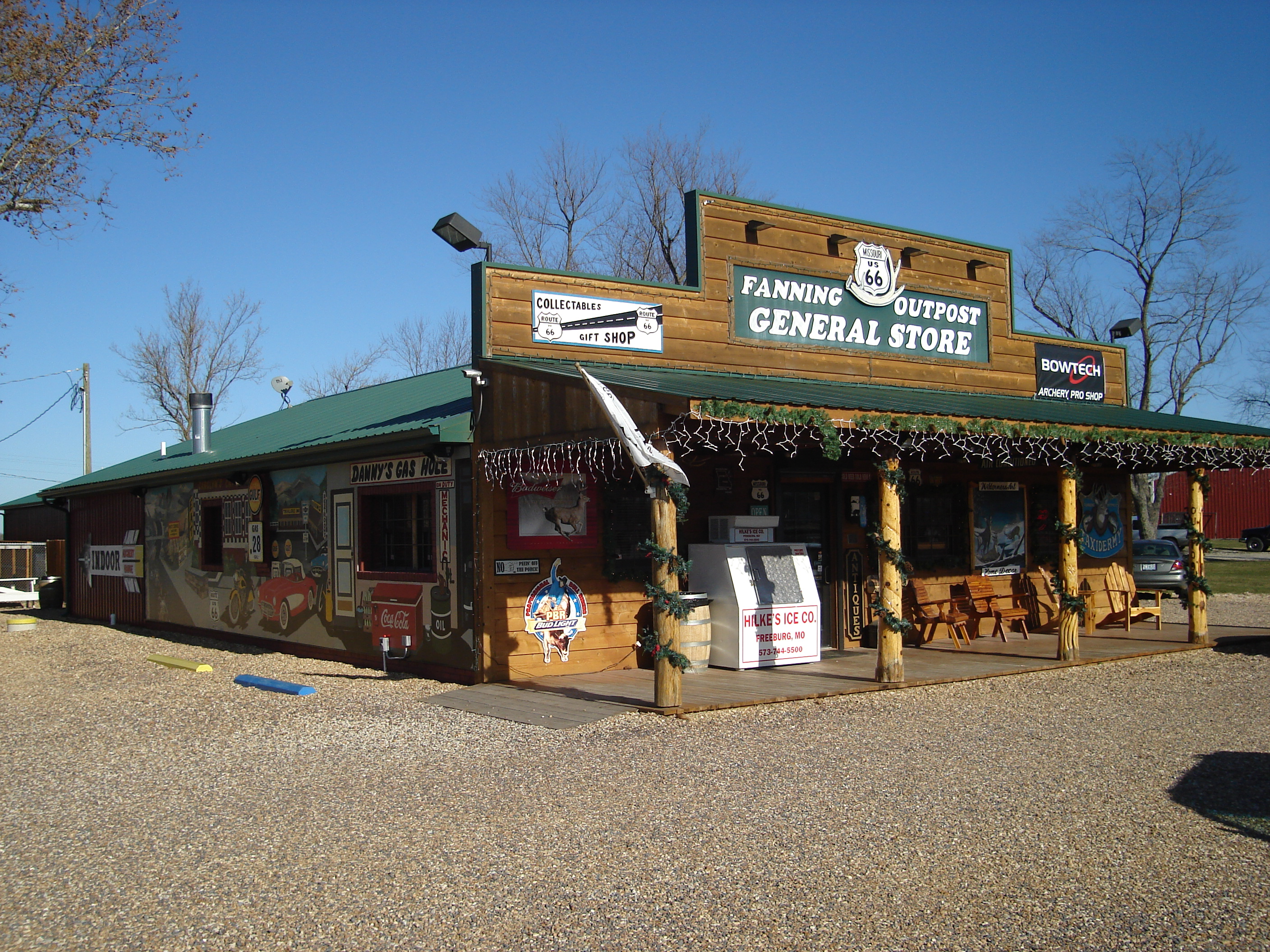
- Interactive map of Fanning, Missouri
- Coordinates: 38°02′14″N 91°28′12″W
- Country: United States
- State: Missouri
- County: Crawford

Fanning is an unincorporated community in western Crawford County, Missouri, United States. It lies along former U.S. Route 66, now Missouri Supplemental Route ZZ, four miles southwest of Cuba. Fanning is also home to the world's second largest rocking chair, located outside of the Fanning 66 Outpost.

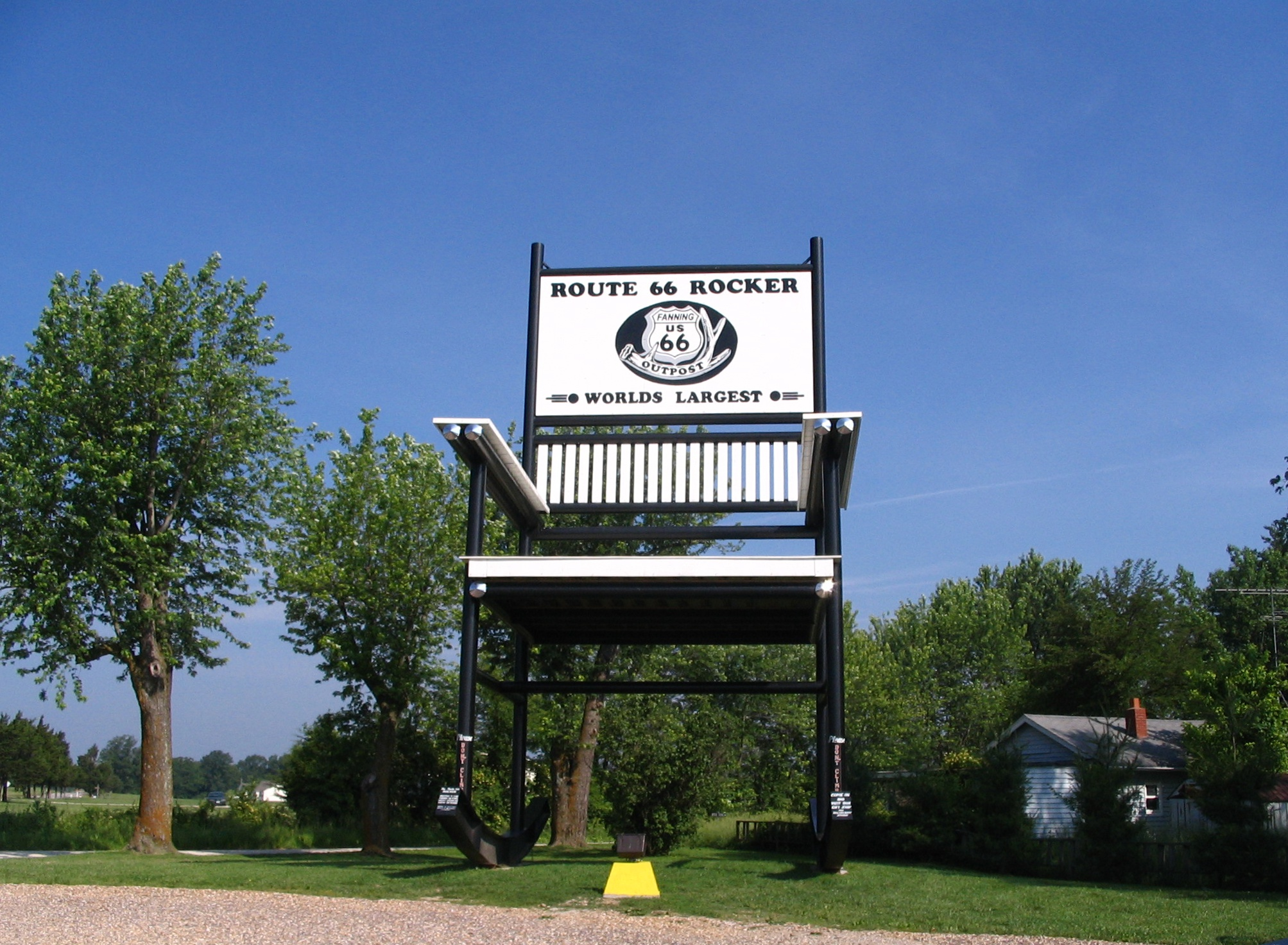
World's Largest Rocking Chair

A post office called Fanning was established in 1887, and remained in operation until 1953. Fanning is named for John Fanning (1821-1906), originally of Limerick, Ireland. John Fanning was the founding railway section foreman beginning in the mid-19th century when the St. Louis-San Francisco Railway (Frisco) was first built through the region. His home, which still stands in Fanning, was for many decades the railway station, church, post office, and social center of the community.
