= Leasburg, Missouri =

- Village
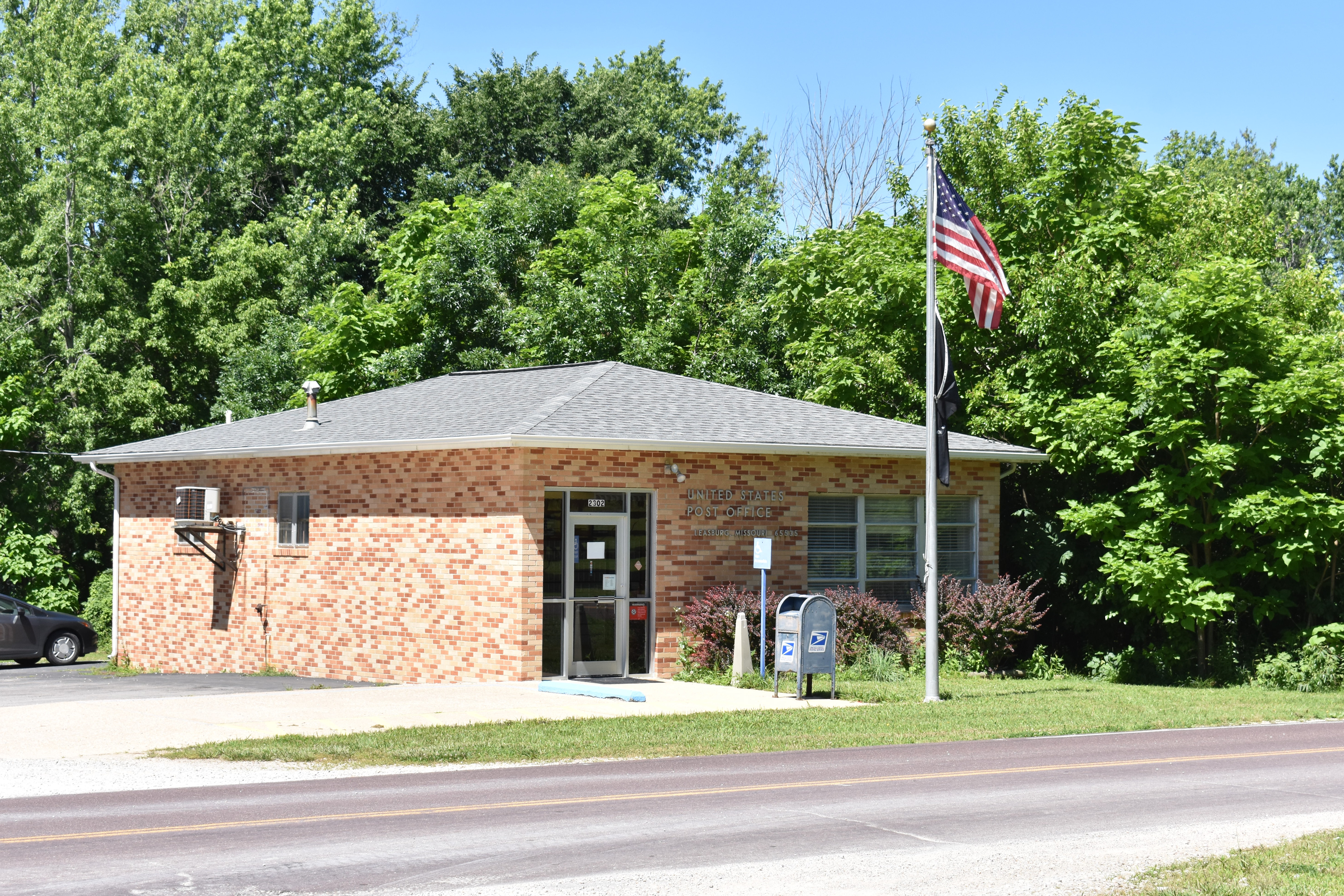
- Leasburg Post Office

- Location of Leasburg, Missouri
- Coordinates: 38°05′41″N 91°17′43″W
- Country: United States
- State: Missouri
- County: Crawford
- Incorporated: 1919

Area
  - Total: 0.43 sq mi (1.12 km^{2})
  - Land: 0.43 sq mi (1.12 km^{2})
  - Water: 0 sq mi (0.00 km^{2})
- Elevation: 1,037 ft (316 m)

Population (2020)
  - Total: 326
  - Density: 753.9/sq mi (291.08/km^{2})
- Time zone: UTC-6 (Central (CST))
  - Summer (DST): UTC-5 (CDT)
- ZIP code: 65535
- Area code: 573
- FIPS code: 29-41114
- GNIS feature ID: 2398407

Leasburg is a village in Crawford County, Missouri, United States. As of the 2020 census, Leasburg had a population of 326.

== History ==
Leasburg was laid out in 1859, and named after Samuel Lea, a pioneer settler. An early variant name was Harrison Station. A post office called Leasburg has been in operation since 1860.

The Scotia Iron Furnace Stack was listed on the National Register of Historic Places in 1969.

== Geography ==
Leasburg is located on Missouri Route H two miles south of I-44. Cuba is six miles to the west and Bourbon is five miles to the northeast. Onondaga Cave State Park is four miles to the southeast along Missouri Route H.

According to the United States Census Bureau, the village has a total area of 0.43 square miles (1.11 km^{2}), all land.

== Demographics ==
Historical population
Census	Pop.	Note	%±
1880	79		—
1930	130		—
1940	173		33.1%
1950	178		2.9%
1960	176		−1.1%
1970	218		23.9%
1980	304		39.4%
1990	289		−4.9%
2000	323		11.8%
2010	338		4.6%
2020	326		−3.6%
U.S. Decennial Census

=== 2010 census ===
As of the census of 2010, there were 338 people, 144 households, and 80 families living in the village. The population density was 786.0 inhabitants per square mile (303.5/km^{2}). There were 155 housing units at an average density of 360.5 per square mile (139.2/km^{2}). The racial makeup of the village was 98.52% White, 0.30% Native American, 0.30% Native Hawaiian or Pacific Islander, and 0.89% from two or more races.

There were 144 households, of which 31.9% had children under the age of 18 living with them, 40.3% were married couples living together, 11.1% had a female householder with no husband present, 4.2% had a male householder with no wife present, and 44.4% were non-families. 41.7% of all households were made up of individuals, and 19.4% had someone living alone who was 65 years of age or older. The average household size was 2.35 and the average family size was 3.26.

The median age in the village was 37.2 years. 27.5% of residents were under the age of 18; 7.9% were between the ages of 18 and 24; 24.3% were from 25 to 44; 25.7% were from 45 to 64; and 14.5% were 65 years of age or older. The gender makeup of the village was 49.7% male and 50.3% female.

=== 2000 census ===
As of the census of 2000, there were 323 people, 144 households, and 88 families living in the village. The population density was 750.2 inhabitants per square mile (289.7/km^{2}). There were 162 housing units at an average density of 376.3 per square mile (145.3/km^{2}). The racial makeup of the village was 98.45% White, 0.62% from other races, and 0.93% from two or more races. Hispanic or Latino of any race were 0.62% of the population.

There were 144 households, out of which 27.8% had children under the age of 18 living with them, 48.6% were married couples living together, 7.6% had a female householder with no husband present, and 38.2% were non-families. 35.4% of all households were made up of individuals, and 16.0% had someone living alone who was 65 years of age or older. The average household size was 2.24 and the average family size was 2.83.

In the village, the population was spread out, with 24.1% under the age of 18, 8.0% from 18 to 24, 26.3% from 25 to 44, 22.3% from 45 to 64, and 19.2% who were 65 years of age or older. The median age was 38 years. For every 100 females, there were 94.6 males. For every 100 females age 18 and over, there were 91.4 males.

The median income for a household in the village was $19,750, and the median income for a family was $29,250. Males had a median income of $27,188 versus $11,875 for females. The per capita income for the village was $11,878. About 14.6% of families and 21.0% of the population were below the poverty line, including 29.1% of those under age 18 and 17.2% of those age 65 or over.

== Education ==
It is in the Crawford County R-I School District.
