= Elayer, Missouri =

Unincorporated community in Missouri, U.S.

Coordinates: 37°58′07″N 91°16′43″W

Elayer (also known as Elaver) is an unincorporated community in Crawford County, in the U.S. state of Missouri.

The community is located on Missouri Route 8, approximately four miles east of Steelville.

The community was named after William Elayer, a railroad official.
