= Cherryville, Missouri =

Unincorporated community in the US state of Missouri

Coordinates: 37°51′07″N 91°16′37″W

Cherryville is an unincorporated community in southeastern Crawford County, Missouri, United States. It is located on Route 19, approximately ten miles south of Steelville, at the northern terminus of Route 49. It is near the Mark Twain National Forest.

A post office called Cherryville has been in operation since 1862. The community most likely was named for cherry trees near the original town site.
