= Missouri Route 8 =

State highway in Missouri, U.S.

Route 8

Route information
- Maintained by MoDOT
- Length: 72.061 mi (115.971 km)

Major junctions
- West end: I-44 / Route 68 in St. James
- Route 19 in Steelville
- East end: US 67 / US 67 Bus. in Desloge

Location
- Country: United States
- State: Missouri
- Counties: Phelps, Crawford, Washington, St. Francois

Highway system
- Missouri State Highway System; Interstate; US; State; Supplemental
← Route 7	→ Route 9

Route 8 is a 69-mile-long (111 km) state highway in the eastern part of the U.S. state of Missouri. It travels from Interstate 44 (I-44) in St. James to U.S. Route 67 (US 67) and US 67 Business in Desloge. It acts as a bypass, from I-44 in St. James, to US 67 in Desloge. Those who want to go to Ste. Genevieve can take US 67 Bus. through Park Hills to US 67, to Farmington, then take Route 32 to Ste. Genevieve.

== Route description ==
Beginning at I-44 in St. James, Route 8 travels eastward through Phelps County, running concurrent with Route 68 for approximately four miles before Route 68 splits off toward Salem. Continuing east, Route 8 passes near Maramec Spring Park, a popular natural attraction, before entering Crawford County and reaching Steelville. In Steelville, the highway briefly overlaps with Route 19 before separating east of town.

Leaving Steelville, Route 8 continues eastward through the Mark Twain National Forest, passing through rolling hills and wooded areas before entering Washington County. The highway reaches Potosi, where it intersects Route 21 and Route 185. East of Potosi, Route 8 continues through rural landscapes, crossing several small creeks and valleys as it approaches St. Francois County.

In St. Francois County, Route 8 enters Desloge, where it runs concurrent with US 67 Bus. for a short distance before terminating at the interchange with US 67. The highway serves as a key east-west corridor in eastern Missouri, connecting several towns and providing access to major highways and scenic areas.

== History ==
Between Steelville and Potosi, Route 8 was initially Route 62 from 1922 to 1926. The route was renumbered because US 60 had been planned as US 62. Originally, it was an earthen road but was improved to gravel by the 1930s. The portion from Steelville to Potosi was first paved in the early 1940s with the rest of the route paved by the 1950s.

== Major intersections ==
County	Location	mi	km	Destinations	Notes
Phelps	St. James	0.000	0.000	I-44 / Route 68 west / Historic US 66 west – St. Louis, Rolla	I-44 exit 195; western end of Route 68 / Historic US 66 overlap
Phelps	St. James	0.466	0.750	Route KK / Historic US 66 east (James Boulevard) – Rosati	Eastern end of Historic US 66 overlap
Phelps		4.785	7.701	Route 68 east – Salem	Eastern end of Route 68 overlap
Crawford	Steelville	17.363	27.943	Route 19 north – Cuba	Western end of Route 19 overlap
Crawford	Steelville	18.039	29.031	Route 19 south	Eastern end of Route 19 overlap
Washington	Potosi	53.132	85.508	Route 185 north – Sullivan	
Washington	Potosi	54.610	87.886	Route 21 – St. Louis, Caledonia	
St. Francois	Park Hills–Desloge line	70.048	112.731	US 67 Bus. south	Western end of US 67 Bus. overlap
St. Francois	Desloge	72.031	115.923	US 67	Interchange; eastern end of US 67 Bus. overlap
St. Francois	Desloge	72.061	115.971	Cedar Falls Road	Eastern end of state maintenance
1.000 mi = 1.609 km; 1.000 km = 0.621 mi
