= Bourbon, Missouri =

- City
- City of Bourbon
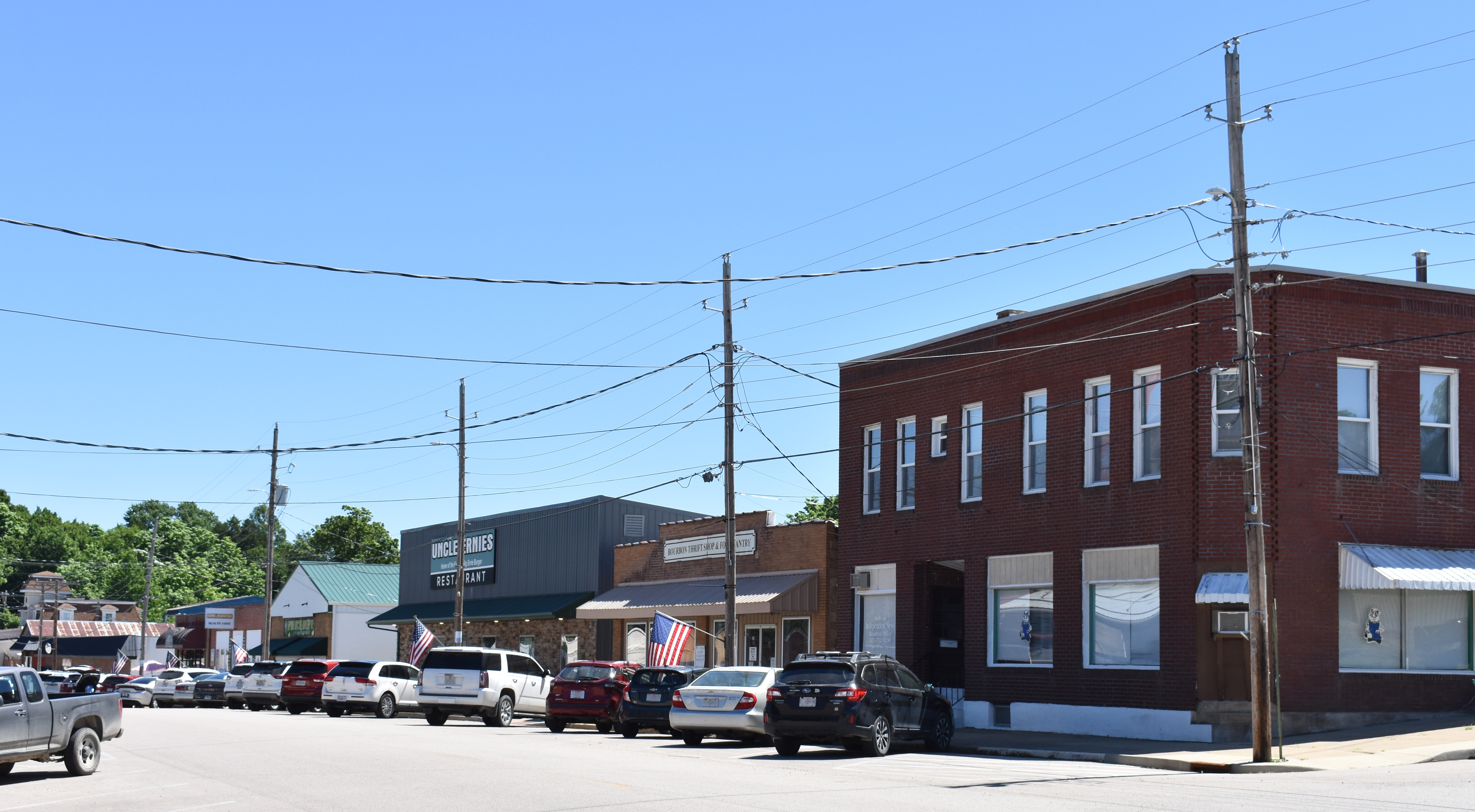
- Downtown

- Location of Bourbon, Missouri
- Coordinates: 38°9′02″N 91°14′57″W
- Country: United States
- State: Missouri
- County: Crawford

Area
  - Total: 1.34 sq mi (3.46 km^{2})
  - Land: 1.34 sq mi (3.46 km^{2})
  - Water: 0 sq mi (0.00 km^{2})
- Elevation: 938 ft (286 m)

Population (2020 United States census)
  - Total: 1,567
  - Density: 1,172.1/sq mi (452.56/km^{2})
- Time zone: UTC-6 (Central (CST))
  - Summer (DST): UTC-5 (CDT)
- ZIP code: 65441
- Area code: 573
- FIPS code: 29-07534
- GNIS feature ID: 2394225

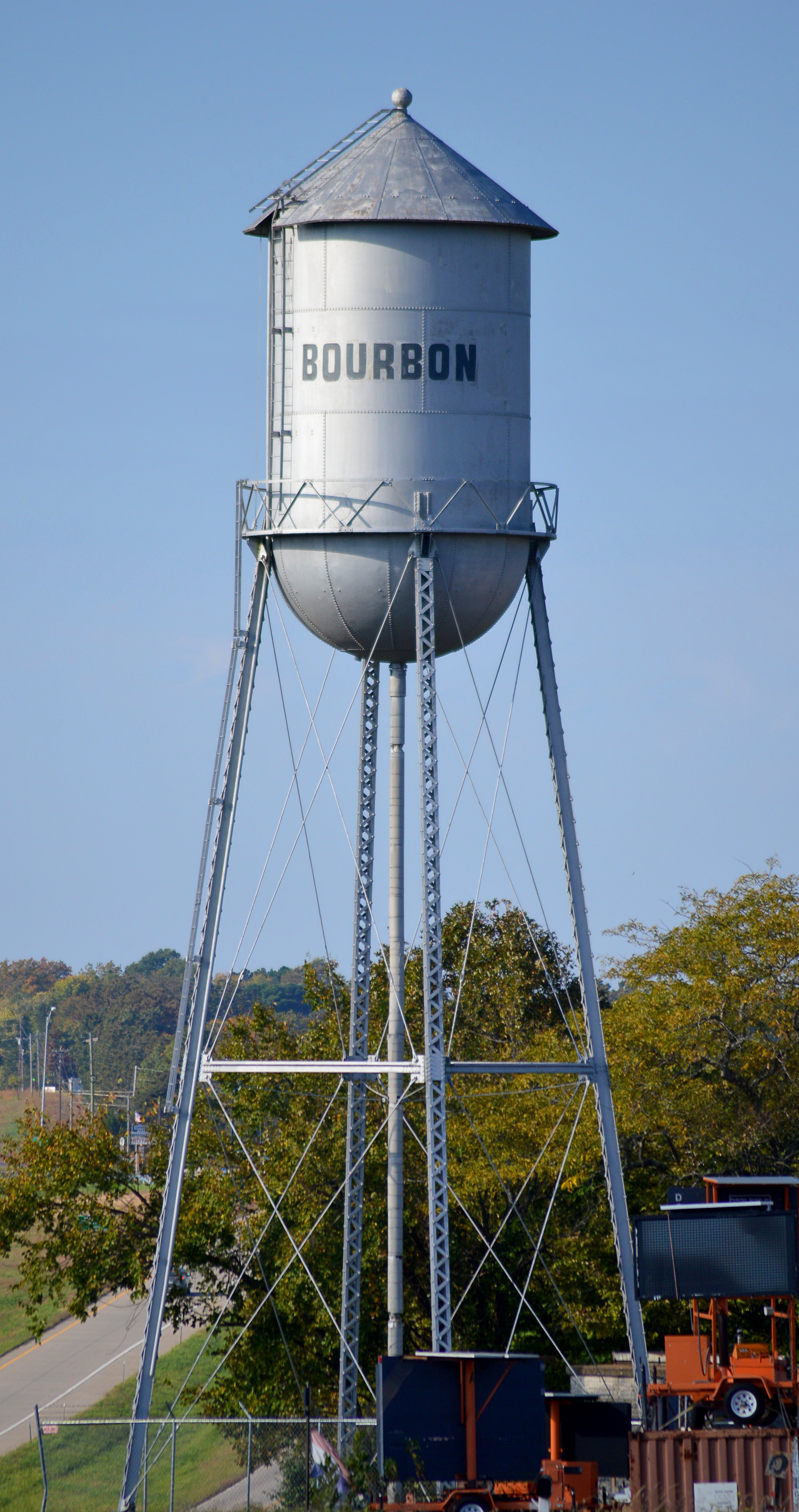
The historic water tower, no longer in use, is a landmark along Interstate 44.

Bourbon is a city in Crawford County, Missouri, United States. As of the 2020 census, Bourbon had a population of 1,567.

== History ==
A post office called Bourbon has been in operation since 1853. The name Bourbon refers to bourbon whiskey and is believed to be the only town in the United States to be named after bourbon whiskey.

== Geography ==
The city is located in northern Crawford County on I-44 between Sullivan to the northeast and Cuba to the southwest.

According to the United States Census Bureau, the city has a total area of 1.34 square miles (3.47 km^{2}), all land.

== Demographics ==
Historical population
Census	Pop.	Note	%±
1880	31		—
1910	382		—
1920	377		−1.3%
1930	379		0.5%
1940	360		−5.0%
1950	543		50.8%
1960	779		43.5%
1970	955		22.6%
1980	1,259		31.8%
1990	1,188		−5.6%
2000	1,348		13.5%
2010	1,632		21.1%
2020	1,567		−4.0%
U.S. Decennial Census

=== 2020 census ===
As of the 2020 census, Bourbon had a population of 1,567. The median age was 35.9 years. 24.9% of residents were under the age of 18 and 15.4% of residents were 65 years of age or older. For every 100 females there were 95.9 males, and for every 100 females age 18 and over there were 91.7 males age 18 and over.

0.0% of residents lived in urban areas, while 100.0% lived in rural areas.

There were 641 households in Bourbon, of which 33.2% had children under the age of 18 living in them. Of all households, 38.2% were married-couple households, 20.1% were households with a male householder and no spouse or partner present, and 32.4% were households with a female householder and no spouse or partner present. About 32.0% of all households were made up of individuals and 14.4% had someone living alone who was 65 years of age or older.

There were 720 housing units, of which 11.0% were vacant. The homeowner vacancy rate was 3.2% and the rental vacancy rate was 9.4%.

Racial composition as of the 2020 census
Race	Number	Percent
White	1,443	92.1%
Black or African American	6	0.4%
American Indian and Alaska Native	2	0.1%
Asian	10	0.6%
Native Hawaiian and Other Pacific Islander	6	0.4%
Some other race	12	0.8%
Two or more races	88	5.6%
Hispanic or Latino (of any race)	28	1.8%

=== 2010 census ===
As of the census of 2010, there were 1,632 people, 652 households, and 433 families living in the city. The population density was 1,217.9 inhabitants per square mile (470.2/km^{2}). There were 718 housing units at an average density of 535.8 per square mile (206.9/km^{2}). The racial makeup of the city was 98.71% White, 0.12% Black or African American, 0.25% Native American, 0.37% Asian, 0.06% from other races, and 0.49% from two or more races. Hispanic or Latino of any race were 0.98% of the population.

There were 652 households, of which 36.2% had children under the age of 18 living with them, 43.9% were married couples living together, 16.6% had a female householder with no husband present, 6.0% had a male householder with no wife present, and 33.6% were non-families. 28.8% of all households were made up of individuals, and 13.2% had someone living alone who was 65 years of age or older. The average household size was 2.50 and the average family size was 3.03.

The median age in the city was 35 years. 27.9% of residents were under the age of 18; 9.1% were between the ages of 18 and 24; 25.5% were from 25 to 44; 22.4% were from 45 to 64; and 15.1% were 65 years of age or older. The gender makeup of the city was 48.8% male and 51.2% female.

=== 2000 census ===
As of the census of 2000, there were 1,348 people, 548 households, and 355 families living in the city. The population density was 1,135.9 inhabitants per square mile (438.6/km^{2}). There were 600 housing units at an average density of 505.6 per square mile (195.2/km^{2}). The racial makeup of the city was 98.89% White, 0.07% African American, 0.45% Native American, and 0.59% from two or more races. Hispanic or Latino of any race were 0.52% of the population.

There were 548 households, out of which 33.6% had children under the age of 18 living with them, 47.6% were married couples living together, 12.6% had a female householder with no husband present, and 35.2% were non-families. 31.8% of all households were made up of individuals, and 16.4% had someone living alone who was 65 years of age or older. The average household size was 2.46 and the average family size was 3.10.

In the city the population was spread out, with 28.8% under the age of 18, 8.1% from 18 to 24, 27.5% from 25 to 44, 19.7% from 45 to 64, and 15.9% who were 65 years of age or older. The median age was 35 years. For every 100 females, there were 98.5 males. For every 100 females age 18 and over, there were 88.6 males.

The median income for a household in the city was $30,240, and the median income for a family was $35,294. Males had a median income of $29,531 versus $20,391 for females. The per capita income for the city was $12,992. About 11.9% of families and 14.2% of the population were below the poverty line, including 19.4% of those under age 18 and 15.9% of those age 65 or over.

== Education ==
It is in the Crawford County R-I School District. Crawford County R-I School District operates one elementary school, one middle school, and Bourbon High School.

Meramec Valley Christian School is the only private Christian school in Bourbon.

Bourbon has a public library, a branch of the Crawford County Library District.

== Notable people ==
- Taylor Louderman, Broadway actress known for Bring it On and Mean Girls, was raised in Bourbon as a child.
- Ruthy Ross, Playboy Playmate, June 1973; born in Bourbon 1948
- Omar Toft, racing driver, born in Bourbon in 1886
