= Crawford County, Missouri =

County in Missouri, United States

- County
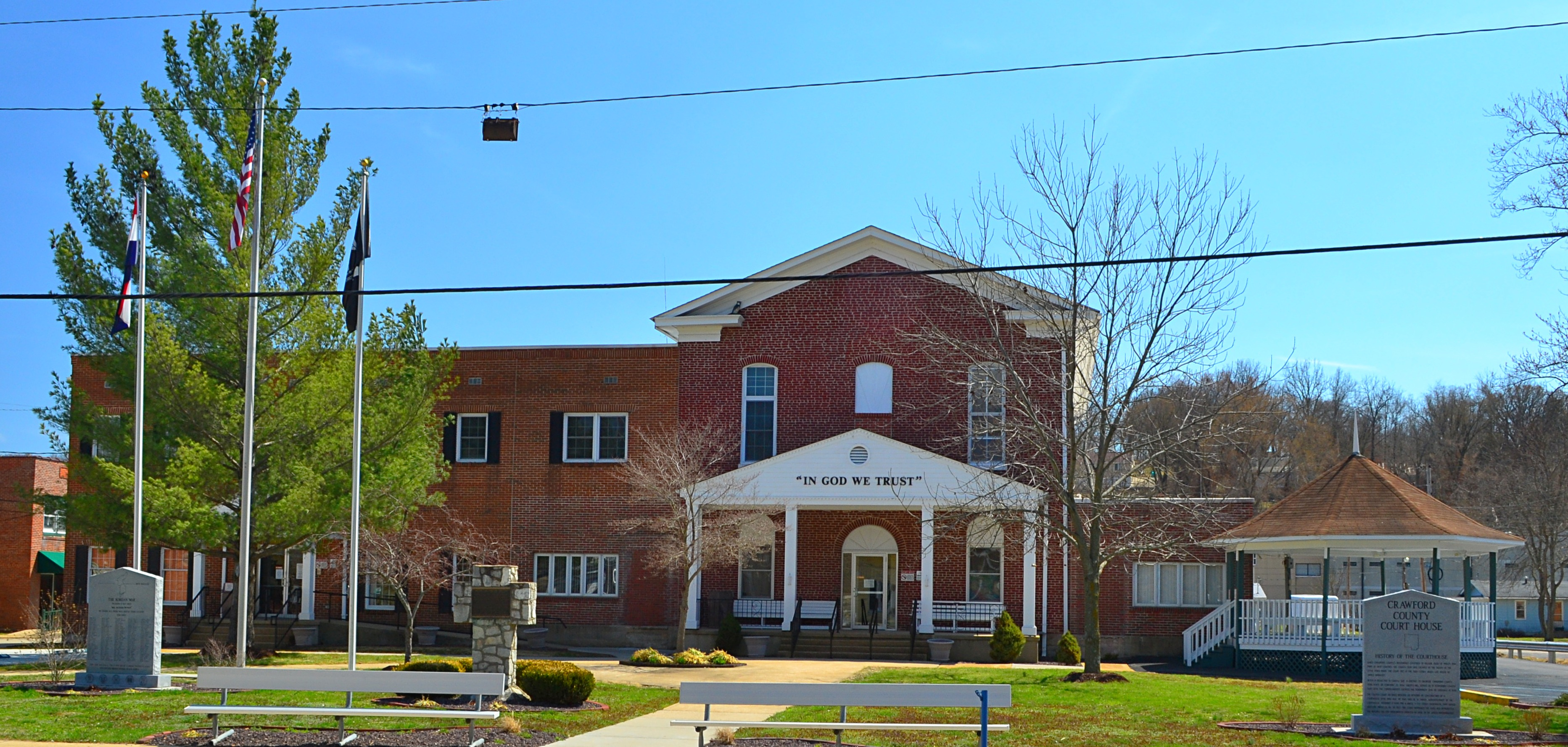
- Crawford County Courthouse in Steelville

- Location within the U.S. state of Missouri
- Coordinates: 37°59′N 91°18′W
- Country: United States
- State: Missouri
- Founded: January 23, 1829
- Named for: William H. Crawford
- Seat: Steelville
- Largest city: Cuba

Area
  - Total: 744 sq mi (1,930 km^{2})
  - Land: 743 sq mi (1,920 km^{2})
  - Water: 1.2 sq mi (3.1 km^{2}) 0.2%

Population (2020)
  - Total: 23,056
  - Estimate (2025): 22,929 ▼
  - Density: 31.0/sq mi (12.0/km^{2})
- Time zone: UTC−6 (Central)
  - Summer (DST): UTC−5 (CDT)
- Congressional district: 8th
- Website: crawfordcountymo.net

Crawford County is a county located in the east-central portion of the U.S. state of Missouri. At the 2020 Census, the population was 23,056. The county was organized in 1829 and is named after U.S. Senator William H. Crawford of Georgia. Its county seat, Steelville, was laid out in 1836.

The section of Sullivan which is located in Crawford County is included in the St. Louis, MO-IL metropolitan statistical area.

In 1990, the mean center of U.S. population was located in southwestern Crawford County.

== Geography ==
According to the U.S. Census Bureau, the county has a total area of 744 square miles (1,930 km^{2}), of which 743 square miles (1,920 km^{2}) is land and 1.2 square miles (3.1 km^{2}) (0.2%) is water.

=== Adjacent counties ===
- Franklin County (north)
- Washington County (east)
- Iron County (southeast)
- Dent County (south)
- Phelps County (west)
- Gasconade County (northwest)

=== Major highways ===
- I-44
- Route 8
- Route 19
- Route 49

=== National protected area ===
- Mark Twain National Forest (part)

== Demographics ==
Historical population
Census	Pop.	Note	%±
1830	1,712		—
1840	3,561		108.0%
1850	6,397		79.6%
1860	5,823		−9.0%
1870	7,982		37.1%
1880	10,756		34.8%
1890	11,961		11.2%
1900	12,959		8.3%
1910	13,576		4.8%
1920	12,355		−9.0%
1930	11,287		−8.6%
1940	12,693		12.5%
1950	11,615		−8.5%
1960	12,647		8.9%
1970	14,828		17.2%
1980	18,300		23.4%
1990	19,173		4.8%
2000	22,804		18.9%
2010	24,646		8.1%
2020	23,056		−6.5%
2025 (est.)	22,929	▼	−0.6%
U.S. Decennial Census; 1790–1960 1900–1990; 1990–2000 2010

=== 2020 census ===
As of the 2020 census, the county had a population of 23,056. The median age was 43.5 years. 22.6% of residents were under the age of 18 and 20.6% of residents were 65 years of age or older. For every 100 females there were 99.5 males, and for every 100 females age 18 and over there were 98.2 males age 18 and over.

The racial makeup of the county was 91.7% White, 0.6% Black or African American, 0.5% American Indian and Alaska Native, 0.4% Asian, 0.1% Native Hawaiian and Pacific Islander, 0.8% from some other race, and 5.9% from two or more races. Hispanic or Latino residents of any race comprised 2.1% of the population.

Crawford County, Missouri – Racial and ethnic composition Note: the US Census treats Hispanic/Latino as an ethnic category. This table excludes Latinos from the racial categories and assigns them to a separate category. Hispanics/Latinos may be of any race.
Race / Ethnicity (NH = Non-Hispanic)	Pop 1980	Pop 1990	Pop 2000	Pop 2010	Pop 2020	% 1980	% 1990	% 2000	% 2010	% 2020
White alone (NH)	18,143	18,995	22,281	23,804	20,980	99.14%	99.07%	97.71%	96.39%	91.00%
Black or African American alone (NH)	3	3	32	64	148	0.02%	0.02%	0.14%	0.26%	0.64%
Native American or Alaska Native alone (NH)	47	36	95	105	107	0.26%	0.19%	0.42%	0.43%	0.46%
Asian alone (NH)	19	24	30	73	81	0.10%	0.13%	0.13%	0.30%	0.35%
Native Hawaiian or Pacific Islander alone (NH)	x	x	12	11	14	x	x	0.05%	0.04%	0.06%
Other race alone (NH)	0	1	0	8	39	0.00%	0.01%	0.00%	0.03%	0.17%
Mixed race or Multiracial (NH)	x	x	178	266	1,205	x	x	0.78%	1.08%	5.23%
Hispanic or Latino (any race)	88	114	176	365	482	0.48%	0.59%	0.77%	1.48%	2.09%
Total	18,300	19,173	22,804	24,696	23,056	100.00%	100.00%	100.00%	100.00%	100.00%

6.8% of residents lived in urban areas, while 93.2% lived in rural areas.

There were 9,314 households in the county, of which 28.4% had children under the age of 18 living with them and 25.0% had a female householder with no spouse or partner present. About 29.0% of all households were made up of individuals and 13.6% had someone living alone who was 65 years of age or older.

There were 11,378 housing units, of which 18.1% were vacant. Among occupied housing units, 69.9% were owner-occupied and 30.1% were renter-occupied. The homeowner vacancy rate was 1.7% and the rental vacancy rate was 8.6%.

=== 2000 census ===
At the 2000 census, there were 22,804 people, 8,858 households and 6,351 families residing in the county. The population density was 31 per square mile (12/km^{2}). There were 10,850 housing units at an average density of 15 units per square mile (5.8/km^{2}). The racial makeup of the county was 98.26% White, 0.14% Black or African American, 0.43% Native American, 0.13% Asian, 0.06% Pacific Islander, 0.14% from other races, and 0.82% from two or more races. Approximately 0.77% of the population were Hispanic or Latino of any race.

There were 8,858 households, of which 32.80% had children under the age of 18 living with them, 58.70% were married couples living together, 9.00% had a female householder with no husband present, and 28.30% were non-families. 24.30% of all households were made up of individuals, and 11.30% had someone living alone who was 65 years of age or older. The average household size was 2.53 and the average family size was 3.00.

26.30% of the population were under the age of 18, 7.90% from 18 to 24, 26.90% from 25 to 44, 23.10% from 45 to 64, and 15.80% who were 65 years of age or older. The median age was 38 years. For every 100 females there were 97.30 males. For every 100 females age 18 and over, there were 94.60 males.

The median household income was $37,554 and the median family income was $45,059. Males had a median income of $28,005 compared with $18,736 for females. The per capita income was $18,203. About 12.70% of families and 16.30% of the population were below the poverty line, including 23.30% of those under age 18 and 14.10% of those age 65 or over.

== Education ==
K-12 school districts in the county include:

- Crawford County R-I School District
- Crawford County R-2 School District
- Gasconade County R-II School District
- Iron County C-4 School District
- St. James R-I School District
- Steelville R-III School District
- Sullivan C-2 School District

There are also two elementary school districts: North Wood R-IV School District and Strain-Japan R-XVI School District.

=== Public schools ===
- Crawford County R-I School District - Bourbon
  - Bourbon Elementary School (PK−4)
  - Bourbon Middle School (5−8)
  - Bourbon High School (9–12)
- Crawford County R-II School District - Cuba
  - Cuba Elementary School (K−4)
  - Cuba Middle School (5−8)
  - Cuba High School (9–12)
- Steelville R-III School District - Steelville
  - Steelville Elementary School (PK−4)
  - Steelville Middle School (5−8)
  - Steelville High School (9–12)

=== Private schools ===
- Meramec Valley Christian School - Sullivan - Baptist - (PK–12)
- Holy Cross Catholic School - Cuba - Catholic - (PK−8)

=== Public libraries ===
- Bourbon Branch Library
- Recklein Memorial Branch Library
- Steelville Branch Library

== Communities ==
=== Cities and towns ===
- Bourbon
- Cuba
- Leasburg
- St. Cloud
- Steelville (county seat)
- Sullivan (partial)
- West Sullivan

=== Census-designated place ===
- Indian Lake

=== Unincorporated communities ===
- Argo
- Berryman
- Butts
- Cherry Valley
- Cherryville
- Coffeyton
- Cook Station
- Czar
- Davisville
- Delhi
- Dillard
- Elayer
- Fanning
- Harrison Mills
- Hinch
- Hofflins
- Huzzah
- Iron Center
- Jake Prairie
- Keysville
- Midland
- Oak Hill
- Patsy
- Scotia
- Service
- Wesco
- Westover

=== Townships ===
- Benton
- Boone
- Courtois
- Knobview
- Liberty
- Meramec
- Oak Hill
- Osage
- Union

== Politics ==
=== Local ===
The Republican Party controls politics at the local level in Crawford County. Republicans hold all elected positions in the county.

Crawford County, Missouri

Elected countywide officials
Assessor	Kellie Vestal	Republican
Circuit Clerk	Karen R. Harlan	Republican
County Clerk	John G. Martin	Republican
Collector	Pat Schwent	Republican
Commissioner (presiding)	Leo Sanders	Republican
Commissioner (district 1)	Rob Cummings	Republican
Commissioner (district 2)	Jared Boast	Republican
Coroner	Paul Hutson	Republican
Prosecuting Attorney	David Smith	Republican
Public Administrator	Franky Todd	Republican
Recorder	Kimberly A. Cook	Republican
Sheriff	Darin Layman	Republican
Surveyor	Mark Mueller	Republican
Treasurer	Karen Sikes	Republican

=== State ===
Past Gubernatorial Elections Results
Year	Republican	Democratic	Third Parties
2024	79.84% 5,055	18.20% 726	1.95% 209
2020	77.57% 8,480	20.40% 2,230	2.03% 222
2016	59.72% 5,899	29.28% 2,892	11.00% 1,086
2012	52.23% 4,978	44.85% 4,275	2.92% 278
2008	46.18% 4,627	51.94% 5,204	1.88% 188
2004	57.70% 5,422	40.92% 3,845	1.38% 130
2000	52.53% 4,352	43.74% 3,624	3.73% 309
1996	44.72% 3,425	52.87% 4,049	2.42% 185
1992	42.17% 3,470	57.83% 4,758	0.00% 0
1988	66.26% 4,636	33.04% 2,312	0.70% 49
1984	60.87% 4,408	39.13% 2,834	0.00% 0
1980	53.65% 3,722	45.88% 3,183	0.46% 32
1976	49.50% 3,376	50.43% 3,439	0.07% 5
1972	57.31% 3,980	42.56% 2,956	0.13% 9
1968	47.84% 2,983	52.16% 3,253	0.00% 0
1964	46.22% 2,777	53.78% 3,231	0.00% 0
1960	56.30% 3,570	43.70% 2,771	0.00% 0

Crawford County is split between two of the districts that elect members of the Missouri House of Representatives, both of which are currently represented by Republicans.

- District 62 — Tom Hurst (R-Meta). Consists of the northwest corner of the county.

Missouri House of Representatives — District 62 — Crawford County (2018)
Party	Candidate	Votes	%	±%
Republican	Tom Hurst	175	75.75	
Democratic	Ashley D. Fajkowski	56	24.24	

Missouri House of Representatives — District 62 — Crawford County (2016)
Party	Candidate	Votes	%	±%
Republican	Tom Hurst	251	100.00%	

Missouri House of Representatives — District 62 — Crawford County (2014)
Party	Candidate	Votes	%	±%
Republican	Tom Hurst	152	100.00%	+38.55

Missouri House of Representatives — District 62 — Crawford County (2012)
Party	Candidate	Votes	%	±%
Republican	Tom Hurst	169	61.45%	
Democratic	Greg Stratman	106	38.55%	

- District 120 — Jason Chimpman (R- Steelville). Consists of almost of the county.

Missouri House of Representatives — District 120 — Crawford County (2018)
Party	Candidate	Votes	%	±%
Republican	Jason Chipman	5739	69.65	
Democratic	Theresa Schmitt	2500	30.34	

Missouri House of Representatives — District 120 — Crawford County (2016)
Party	Candidate	Votes	%	±%
Republican	Jason Chipman	8,374	100.00%	+23.09

Missouri House of Representatives — District 120 — Crawford County (2014)
Party	Candidate	Votes	%	±%
Republican	Jason Chipman	4,158	76.91%	+4.31
Democratic	Zechariah Hockersmith	1,248	23.09%	−4.31

Missouri House of Representatives — District 120 — Crawford County (Special Election 2013)
Party	Candidate	Votes	%	±%
Republican	Shawn Sisco	2,340	72.60%	−27.40
Democratic	Zechariah Hockersmith	883	27.40%	+27.40

Missouri House of Representatives — District 120 — Crawford County (2012)
Party	Candidate	Votes	%	±%
Republican	Jason T. Smith	7,799	100.00%	

In the Missouri Senate, all of Crawford County is a part of Missouri's 16th District and is represented by Republican Justin Brown.

Missouri Senate — District 16 — Crawford County (2014)
Party	Candidate	Votes	%	±%
Republican	Dan Brown	4,741	100.00%	

=== Federal ===
U.S. Senate — Missouri — Crawford County (2016)
Party	Candidate	Votes	%	±%
Republican	Roy Blunt	6,163	62.69%	+13.79
Democratic	Jason Kander	3,144	31.98%	−12.57
Libertarian	Jonathan Dine	236	2.40%	−4.15
Green	Johnathan McFarland	130	1.32%	+1.32
Constitution	Fred Ryman	158	1.61%	+1.61

U.S. Senate — Missouri — Crawford County (2012)
Party	Candidate	Votes	%	±%
Republican	Todd Akin	4,654	48.90%	
Democratic	Claire McCaskill	4,240	44.55%	
Libertarian	Jonathan Dine	623	6.55%	

All of Crawford County is included in Missouri's 8th Congressional District and is currently represented by Republican Jason T. Smith of Salem in the U.S. House of Representatives. Smith won a special election on Tuesday, June 4, 2013, to complete the remaining term of former Republican Jo Ann Emerson of Cape Girardeau. Emerson announced her resignation a month after being reelected with over 70 percent of the vote in the district. She resigned to become CEO of the National Rural Electric Cooperative.

U.S. House of Representatives — Missouri's 8th Congressional District — Crawford County (2016)
Party	Candidate	Votes	%	±%
Republican	Jason T. Smith	7,589	78.17%	+2.58
Democratic	Dave Cowell	1,849	19.04%	−0.69
Libertarian	Jonathan Shell	271	2.79%	+1.22

U.S. House of Representatives — Missouri's 8th Congressional District — Crawford County (2014)
Party	Candidate	Votes	%	±%
Republican	Jason T. Smith	4,294	75.59%	−7.32
Democratic	Barbara Stocker	1,121	19.73%	+3.88
Libertarian	Rick Vandeven	89	1.57	+1.05
Constitution	Doug Enyart	74	1.30%	+0.78
Independent	Terry Hampton	103	1.81%	+1.81

U.S. House of Representatives — Missouri's 8th Congressional District — Crawford County (Special Election 2013)
Party	Candidate	Votes	%	±%
Republican	Jason T. Smith	1,276	82.91%	+10.74
Democratic	Steve Hodges	244	15.85%	−9.13
Libertarian	Bill Slantz	8	0.52%	−2.32
Constitution	Doug Enyart	8	0.52%	+0.52
Write-In	Thomas Brown	2	0.13%	+0.13
Write-In	Wayne L. Byington	1	0.07%	+0.07

U.S. House of Representatives — Missouri's 8th Congressional District — Crawford County (2012)
Party	Candidate	Votes	%	±%
Republican	Jo Ann Emerson	6,757	72.17%	
Democratic	Jack Rushin	2,339	24.98%	
Libertarian	Rick Vandeven	266	2.84%	

==== Political culture ====
United States presidential election results for Crawford County, Missouri
Year	Republican		Democratic		Third party(ies)	
Year	No.	%	No.	%	No.	%
1888	1,255	51.48%	1,172	48.07%	11	0.45%
1892	1,269	50.94%	1,176	47.21%	46	1.85%
1896	1,447	50.91%	1,383	48.66%	12	0.42%
1900	1,470	51.94%	1,318	46.57%	42	1.48%
1904	1,535	53.97%	1,175	41.32%	134	4.71%
1908	1,752	56.77%	1,260	40.83%	74	2.40%
1912	1,045	42.04%	1,037	41.71%	404	16.25%
1916	1,642	54.35%	1,312	43.43%	67	2.22%
1920	2,634	60.44%	1,658	38.04%	66	1.51%
1924	2,336	55.77%	1,697	40.51%	156	3.72%
1928	2,926	66.08%	1,476	33.33%	26	0.59%
1932	2,213	40.79%	3,166	58.36%	46	0.85%
1936	3,041	51.01%	2,879	48.30%	41	0.69%
1940	3,615	56.79%	2,736	42.99%	14	0.22%
1944	3,077	58.45%	2,177	41.36%	10	0.19%
1948	2,650	53.55%	2,289	46.25%	10	0.20%
1952	3,753	60.34%	2,453	39.44%	14	0.23%
1956	3,594	59.41%	2,455	40.59%	0	0.00%
1960	4,065	63.00%	2,387	37.00%	0	0.00%
1964	2,660	43.58%	3,444	56.42%	0	0.00%
1968	3,525	55.78%	2,123	33.60%	671	10.62%
1972	4,595	67.15%	2,248	32.85%	0	0.00%
1976	3,224	47.18%	3,565	52.17%	44	0.64%
1980	4,081	58.21%	2,710	38.65%	220	3.14%
1984	4,716	64.37%	2,610	35.63%	0	0.00%
1988	3,856	55.19%	3,107	44.47%	24	0.34%
1992	2,831	33.76%	3,515	41.92%	2,039	24.32%
1996	2,990	39.05%	3,349	43.74%	1,317	17.20%
2000	4,754	57.26%	3,350	40.35%	198	2.38%
2004	5,686	60.61%	3,632	38.72%	63	0.67%
2008	6,007	59.56%	3,911	38.78%	167	1.66%
2012	6,434	67.17%	2,951	30.81%	194	2.03%
2016	7,724	77.86%	1,824	18.39%	372	3.75%
2020	8,725	79.51%	2,113	19.26%	135	1.23%
2024	8,742	80.73%	2,007	18.53%	80	0.74%

Crawford County is like most rural counties, socially conservative and vote in favor of the Republican Party. Bill Clinton was the last Democratic presidential nominee to win Crawford County in 1996. Since then, voters in the county have substantially supported Republicans at the national level.

==== 2008 Missouri presidential primary ====
In the 2008 Missouri Presidential Primary, voters in Crawford County from both political parties supported candidates who finished in second place in the state at large and nationally.

Republican

Former Governor Mike Huckabee (R-Arkansas) won Crawford County by just one vote with 32.71 percent of the vote. U.S. Senator John McCain (R-Arizona) finished in second place in Crawford County with 32.66 percent. Former Governor Mitt Romney (R-Massachusetts) came in third place, receiving 27.76 percent of the vote while libertarian-leaning U.S. Representative Ron Paul (R-Texas) finished fourth with 5.15 percent.

Democratic

Then-U.S. Senator Hillary Clinton (D-New York) won a decisive victory in Crawford County with 66.36 percent of the vote. Then-U.S. Senator Barack Obama (D-Illinois) received 30.07 percent of the vote from Crawford County Democrats. Although he withdrew from the race, former U.S. Senator John Edwards (D-North Carolina) still received 2.61 percent of the vote in Crawford County.

== See also ==
- National Register of Historic Places listings in Crawford County, Missouri
