= Sims Branch =

Stream in the American state of Missouri

Sims Branch is a stream in northern Greene County in the U.S. state of Missouri. It is a tributary of the North Dry Sac River.

The stream's headwaters arise just northwest of the community of Hickory Barren at 37°20′41″N 93°14′59″W and it flows northwest, passing under routes H and CC to its confluence with the North Dry Sac at 37°24′18″N 93°19′26″W.

Sims Branch bears the name of an early settler.

== See also ==
- List of rivers of Missouri
