= Wolf Branch =

Wolf Branch may refer to:

- Wolf Branch (Big Lake Creek), a stream in Missouri
- Wolf Branch (Little Bridge Creek), a stream in Missouri
