= Bagby Branch =

Stream in Missouri, U.S.

Coordinates: 39°20′49″N 92°39′22″W

Bagby Branch is a stream in Howard and Randolph counties in the U.S. state of Missouri. It is a tributary of Silver Creek.

Bagby Branch, historically called "Bagby's Creek" has the name of the local Bagby family.

== See also ==
- List of rivers of Missouri
