= Rollins Creek =

Rollins Creek may refer to:

- Rollins Creek (Des Moines River), a stream in Missouri
- Rollins Creek (Ray County, Missouri), a stream in Missouri
