= Bear Creek (Fabius River tributary) =

Stream in Missouri, U.S.

Coordinates: 40°15′10″N 91°52′30″W

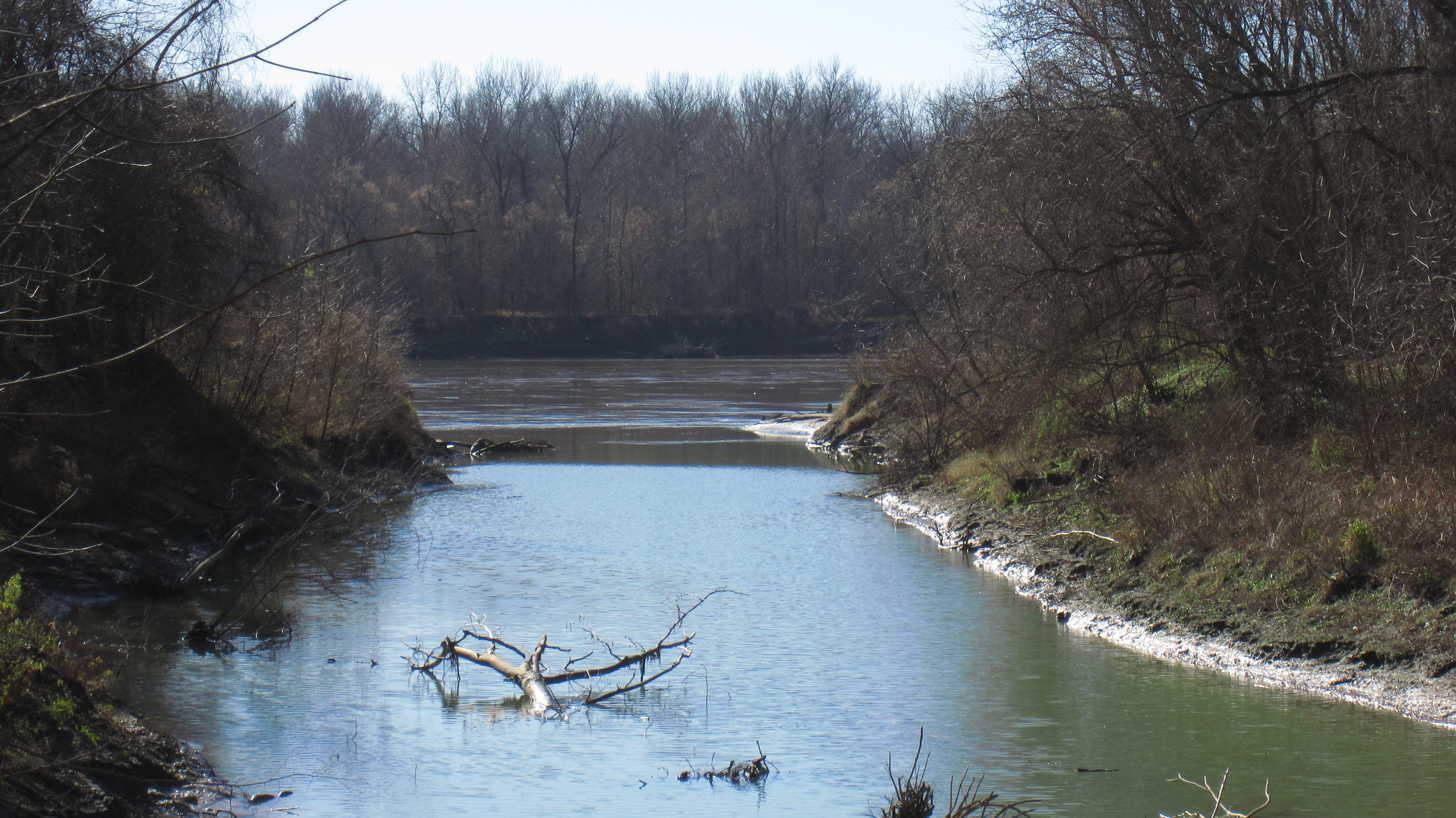

- Location within Missouri

Location
- Country: United States
- State: Missouri
- Counties: Clark, Lewis, Scotland

Physical characteristics
- Mouth: Fabius River

Bear Creek is a stream in Clark, Lewis, and Scotland counties in the U.S. state of Missouri. It is a tributary of the Fabius River.

Bear Creek was named due to the fact that it was a hunting ground of bears by pioneers.

== See also ==
- List of rivers of Missouri
