= Terrell Creek (Missouri) =

Stream in the American state of Missouri

Terrell Creek or Terril Creek is a stream in the "western panhandle" of Christian County in the Ozarks of southwest Missouri.

The stream headwaters arise northeast of Missouri Route 14 and southeast of Billings at 37°02′54″N 93°32′10″W and the stream flows north then east passing under Route P south of Republic. It continues east passing under Route ZZ just south of the community of Terrell and the southern border of Wilson's Creek National Battlefield to its confluence with Wilsons Creek at 37°05′01″N 93°24′16″W.

Terrell Creek has the name of the local Terril family.

== See also ==
- List of rivers of Missouri
