= Gartners Branch =

Stream in the American state of Missouri

Coordinates: 38°52′28″N 92°48′28″W

Gartners Branch is a stream in Cooper County in the U.S. state of Missouri. It is a tributary of Stephens Branch.

The source of the name Gartners is obscure.

Pilot Grove is the closest census-designated place (CDP) to Gartners Branch.

== See also ==
- List of rivers of Missouri
