= Silva, Missouri =

Silva
- Unincorporated community
- Location within the state of Missouri
- Coordinates: 37°10′34″N 90°27′49″W
- Country: United States
- State: Missouri
- County: Wayne
- Elevation: 404 ft (123 m)
- Time zone: UTC-6 (Central (CST))
  - Summer (DST): UTC-5 (CDT)
- ZIP code: 63964
- Area code: 573
- GNIS feature ID: 752158

Silva is an unincorporated community in Wayne County, Missouri, United States.

== History ==
A post office called Silva has been in operation since 1902. An early postmaster gave the community the name of one of her acquaintances.

Silva is home to Camp Lewallen, a Boy Scout Camp serving the Scouts of the Greater St. Louis Area Council. It has a replica statue of the Strengthen the Arm of Liberty.

Silva was struck by three tornadoes. The first one struck the town on May 21, 1957, hitting four farms, damaging other structures, and unroofing a few houses. The second one struck on May 25, 2011. A camper, a mobile home, and several vehicles were destroyed, churches were damaged, and many roads were blocked by fallen trees. Two people were injured by one of those fallen trees. In the 2011 Super Outbreak, it was also struck by an F1 tornado, which damaged the side of a church and downed several trees.

== Geography ==
Silva is located on U.S. Route 67 just south of Missouri Route 34, approximately thirteen miles east of Piedmont and three miles north of Greenville. The community is at the north end of Lake Wappapello and the St. Francis River flows past one mile to the west. The tributary of the St. Francis River, Hubble Creek, and its tributaries, Peters Branch, Frazier Creek and Bounds Creek, also flow through Silva. The community has access to Sam A. Baker State Park from the west.

== Education ==
Silva is served by the Greenville R-II School District in nearby Greenville. The community is also home to New Hope Christian Academy.
