= Betsy Branch =

Stream in the American state of Missouri

Coordinates: 40°02′47″N 91°43′10″W

Betsy Branch is a stream in Lewis County in the U.S. state of Missouri. It is a tributary of the Middle Fabius River.

The namesake of Betsy Branch has been lost to history.

== See also ==
- List of rivers of Missouri
