= Grove Creek =

Grove Creek may refer to:

- Grove Creek Observatory, an astronomical observatory in Trunkey Creek, New South Wales, Australia
- 217603 Grove Creek, an asteroid
- Round Grove Creek, a stream in Jackson County, Missouri
- Grove Creek Natural Area (Virginia)
