= Hubble Creek (Castor River Diversion Channel tributary) =

Stream in Missouri, US

Hubble Creek is a stream in Cape Girardeau County, Missouri in the United States. It is a tributary of the Castor River Diversion Channel.

The stream headwaters arise at 37°27′00″N 89°38′11″W just east of Fruitland. The stream flows south passing under I-55 at the intersection with US Route 61. The stream runs parallel to Route 61 through Jackson and continues south past the communities of Gordonville and Dutchtown to its confluence with the Castor River Diversion Channel at 37°14′01″N 89°40′28″W.

Hubble Creek derives its name from Isthamar Hubble, a pioneer who settled at the creek in the late 1790s. Mr. Hubble was the proprietor of a mill on Hubble Creek.

== See also ==
- List of rivers of Missouri
- Hubble Creek, Wayne County
