= Brush Creek (Blue River tributary) =

Stream in Kansas and Missouri, U.S.

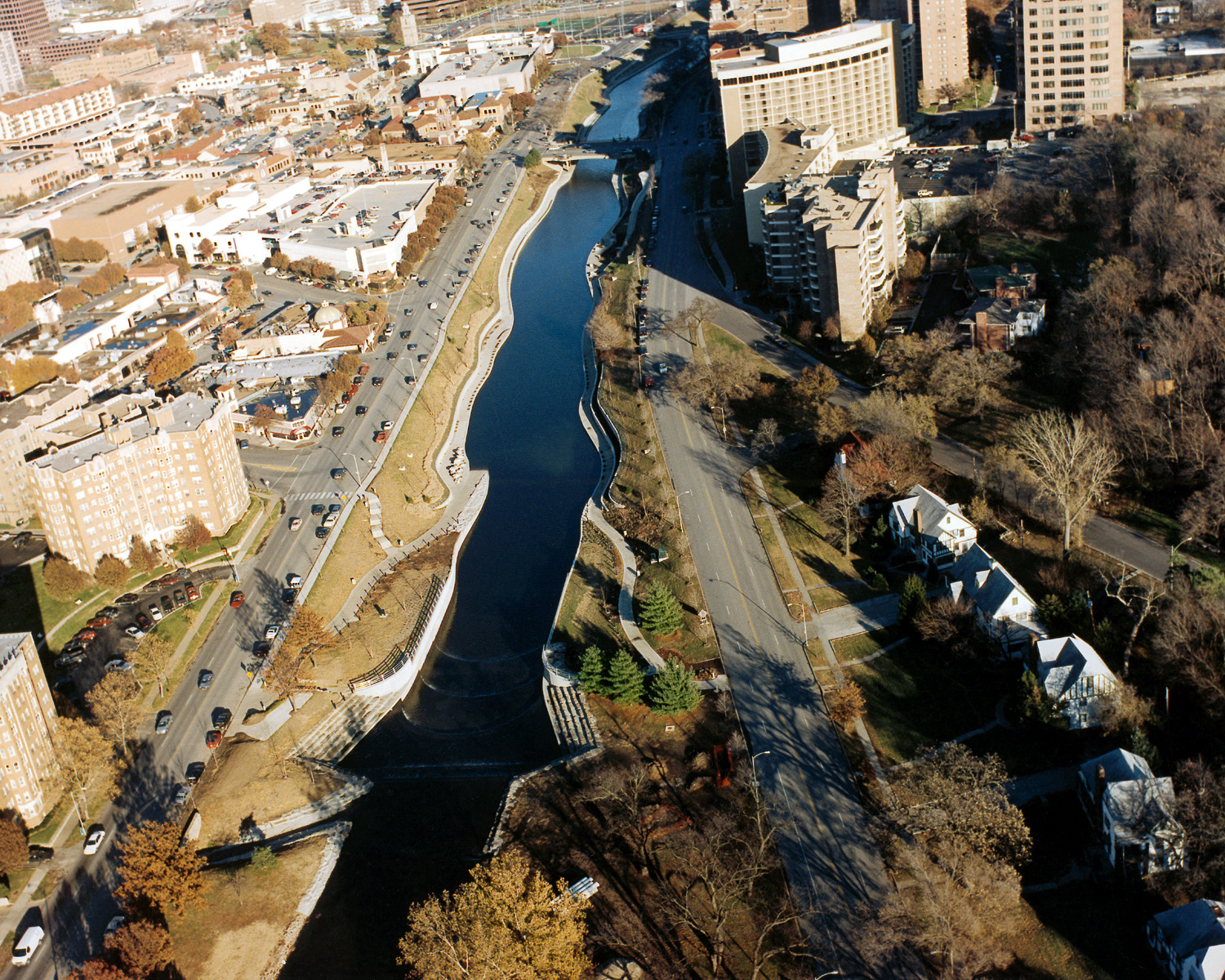
- Brush Creek flowing through Kansas City, Missouri

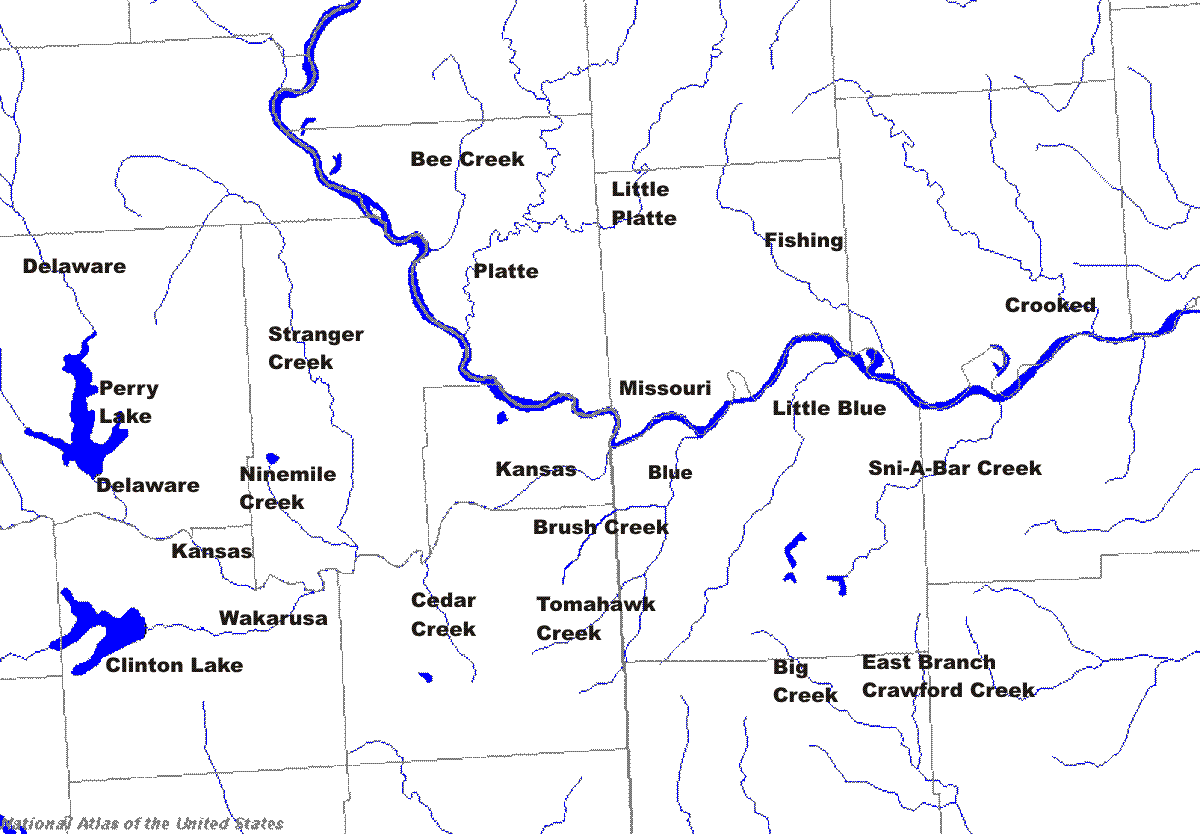
- Kansas City metropolitan rivers with Brush Creek in the middle

Location
- Country: United States
- State: Kansas, Missouri
- City: Kansas City

Physical characteristics
- Source
  - location: East Johnson County, Kansas, United States
  - coordinates: 38°59′04″N 094°39′34″W
  - elevation: 741 ft (226 m)
- Mouth: Blue River
  - location: Kansas City, Missouri, United States
  - coordinates: 39°02′20″N 94°31′14″W
  - elevation: 222 ft (68 m)
- Length: 10.5 mi (16.9 km), East

Basin features
- River system: Blue River

Brush Creek is a 10.5-mile-long (16.9 km) stream that runs from Johnson County, Kansas, through Jackson County, Missouri. It is a tributary of the Blue River.

Brush Creek begins near West 80th Street and Lamar Avenue in Overland Park, Kansas, and drains to the Blue River at Blue Banks Avenue and Hardesty Avenue in Kansas City.

== History ==
Brush Creek was named for the brush once lining its course.

The Battle of Westport, the biggest battle in the American Civil War west of the Mississippi River, was fought on either side of it.

The Country Club Plaza is built on the banks of the creek. The expansive lawn of Nelson-Atkins Museum of Art runs from the steps of the museum down to the creek.

Attempts to control flooding on the creek by paving it with concrete produced by companies owned by Political Boss Thomas Pendergast was a scandal in the 1930s.

Heavy rainfall in September 1977 resulted in Brush Creek flooding the Plaza with 5 to 6 feet (1.5 to 1.8 m) of water. The next stream westward, Turkey Creek on the Kansas side, also flooded at the same time. Twenty-five people died in the flood, and damage exceeded $66 million.

== Today ==
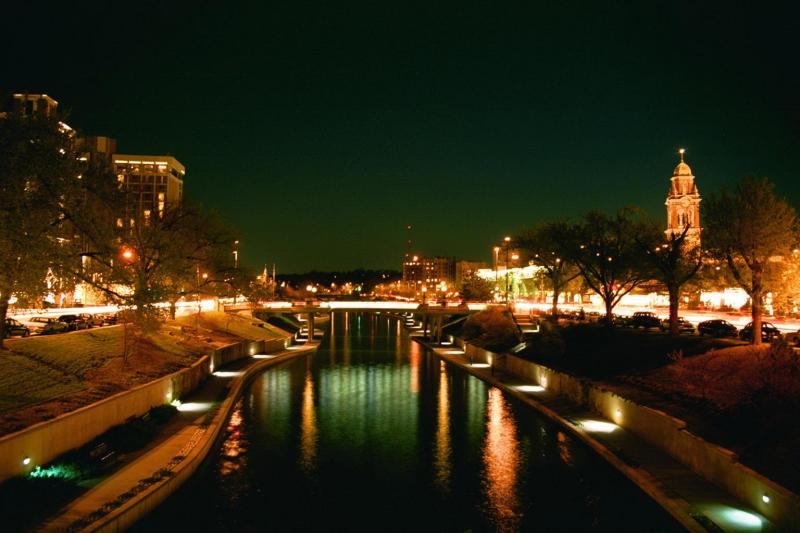
Brush Creek in the Country Club Plaza

Kansas City, Missouri, has a combined storm water and sanitary sewer system. During heavy rains, sewage from the sanitary sewer can overflow into the storm sewer and appear in local waterways. Several waterways, including Brush Creek, are posted with signs discouraging contact with the water after rain. Because of this, one local nickname for this stream is "Flush Creek". In 2010, as part of a settlement with the EPA, Kansas City started a 25-year, $2.5 billion project to address this issue and to improve the city's sanitary and storm sewers.

== See also ==
- List of rivers of Kansas
- List of rivers of Missouri
