= McMullen (disambiguation) =

McMullen is a surname.

McMullen may also refer to the following places in the United States:

- McMullen, Alabama, a town
- McMullen, Virginia, an unincorporated community
- McMullen County, Texas
- McMullen Branch, a stream in Missouri

== See also ==
- McMullens, a British regional brewery in Hertford
