= Lollar Branch =

Stream in the US state of Missouri

Lollar Branch is a stream in Franklin County in the U.S. state of Missouri. It is a tributary of Spring Creek.

The stream headwaters arise just north of US Route 44 approximately 1.5 miles southwest of Stanton at 38°15′27″N 91°07′44″W. The stream flows generally to the north passing under Missouri Route JJ to enter Spring Creek one mile upstream from Spring Creeks confluence with the Bourbeuse River at 38°17′51″N 91°07′31″W.

According to the State Historical Society of Missouri, the namesake of Lollar Branch is unknown.

== See also ==
- List of rivers of Missouri
