= Winsel Creek =

Stream in the US state of Missouri

Winsel Creek (also called Windsell Creek) is a stream in Crawford and Franklin Counties in the U.S. state of Missouri. It is a tributary of Spring Creek in Franklin County.

The stream headwaters arise in northern Crawford County just west of Sullivan (at 38°11′57″N 91°11′10″W). The stream flows northeast past the north side of Sullivan and crosses under I-44 north of Oak Grove then turns to the northwest and crosses under I-44 again. The stream meanders to the northwest to its confluence with Spring Creek (at 38°16′36″N 91°11′19″W).

Windsel derives its name from a local pioneer citizen named Windsell.

== See also ==
- List of rivers of Missouri
