= Turner Fork =

Stream in the US state of Missouri

Coordinates: 39.356145°N 92.597683°W

Turner Fork is a stream in Randolph County in the U.S. state of Missouri. It is a tributary of Silver Creek.

Turner Fork has the name of an early citizen.

== See also ==
- List of rivers of Missouri
