= Cottey =

Cottey may refer to:

- Cottey College, a college in Nevada, Missouri, United States
- Cottey Creek, a stream in Knox County, Missouri, United States

== People with the surname ==
- Tony Cottey (born 1966), Welsh cricketer
