= Fretwell Branch =

Coordinates: 40°07′46″N 91°43′30″W

- Etymology: Named after Leonard and Nancy Ann Fretwell

Location
- Country: United States
- State: Missouri
- County: Lewis

Physical characteristics
- Mouth: North Fabius River

Fretwell Branch is a stream in Lewis County in the U.S. state of Missouri.

Fretwell Branch has the name of Leonard and Nancy Ann Fretwell, pioneer citizens. The Fretwells are cited as original owners of the site.

== See also ==
- List of rivers of Missouri
