= Buck Branch =

Buck Branch may refer to:

- Buck Branch (Deer Creek), a stream in Missouri
- Buck Branch (Duck River), a stream in Tennessee
