= Bounds Creek =

Stream in the U.S. state of Missouri

Coordinates: 37°09′57″N 90°28′15″W

Bounds Creek is a stream in Wayne County in the U.S. state of Missouri. Bounds Creek is a tributary of Hubble Creek.

The stream headwaters are at and the stream flows generally westward crossing under US Route 67 to its confluence with Hubble Creek just south of Silva and within the waters of Lake Wappapello at .

Bounds Creek has the name of Isaac and Stephen Bounds, pioneer citizens.

== See also ==
- List of rivers of Missouri
