= Lumpkins Fork =

River in the United States of America

Lumpkins Fork is a stream in Cass and Jackson County in the U.S. state of Missouri. It is a tributary of Little Blue River.

The stream headwaters arise in northern Cass County at 38°48′53″N 94°27′52″W approximately 1.5 miles north of Raymore and flows north-northwest into Jackson County. The stream enters the Little Blue in east Grandview within the upper reaches of Longview Lake at 38°52′47″N 94°29′21″W.

Lumpkins Fork has the name of the local Lumpkin family.

== See also ==
- List of rivers of Missouri
