= Bridge Creek (Fabius River tributary) =

Stream in the American state of Missouri

Coordinates: 40°11′51″N 91°56′47″W

Bridge Creek is a stream in Knox and Lewis counties of the U.S. state of Missouri. It is a tributary of the Middle Fabius River.

Bridge Creek was named for a covered bridge near its mouth.

== See also ==
- List of rivers of Missouri
