= Stanley Creek (Missouri) =

Stream in Wayne County, Missouri, U.S.

Coordinates: 36.979219°N 90.206492°W

Stanley Creek is a stream in Wayne County in the U.S. state of Missouri. It is a tributary of Mingo Creek.

Stanley Creek has the name of Jaspar Stanley, an early citizen.

== See also ==
- List of rivers of Missouri
