= Hyer Branch =

Stream in the U.S. state of Missouri

Hyer Branch is a stream in Dent and Phelps counties in the Ozarks of Missouri. It is a tributary to the Dry Fork of the Meramec River.

The stream headwaters are at 37°42′39″N 91°40′57″W and the confluence with Dry Fork is at 37°48′05″N 91°39′52″W.

Hyer Branch or Hyer Valley Branch derives its name from John Hyer, a pioneer citizen.

== See also ==
- List of rivers of Missouri
