= Brower Branch =

Stream in the American state of Missouri

Coordinates: 39°53′23″N 91°48′17″W

Brower Branch is a stream in Marion and Shelby counties of the U.S. state of Missouri. It is a tributary of the Fabius River.

Brower Branch has the name of Chancellor Brower, a pioneer settler.

== See also ==
- List of rivers of Missouri
