= Dyke Branch =

Stream in the U.S. state of Missouri

Dyke Branch is a stream in Johnson County, Kansas and Jackson County, Missouri. It is a tributary of Indian Creek. The headwaters are in eastern Kansas at 38°59′22″N 94°37′08″W and the confluence with Indian Creek is in Missouri at 38°57′08″N 94°34′40″W.

Dyke Branch has the name of the local Dyke family.

== See also ==
- List of rivers of Missouri
