= Buck Branch (Deer Creek tributary) =

Stream in the American state of Missouri

Coordinates: 38.1378069°N 93.1510307°W

Buck Branch is a stream in Benton County in the U.S. state of Missouri. It is a tributary of Deer Creek.

Buck Branch was named after the bucks in the area.

== See also ==
- List of rivers of Missouri
