= Coon Creek (South Fork Fabius River tributary) =

Stream in the U.S. state of Missouri

Coordinates: 40.0878175°N 92.0993453°W

Coon Creek is a stream in Knox County in the U.S. state of Missouri. It is a tributary of the South Fork Fabius River.

Coon Creek was named for the abundance of raccoons in the area.

== See also ==
- List of rivers of Missouri
