= Bethel Branch =

Stream in the American state of Missouri

Coordinates: 39°53′36″N 91°33′40″W

Bethel Branch is a stream in Marion County in the U.S. state of Missouri. It is a tributary of the Fabius River.

Bethel Branch took its name from a nearby church of the same name, which in turn was named after Bethel, a place mentioned in the Hebrew Bible.

== See also ==
- List of rivers of Missouri
