= Blair Branch =

Stream in Lewis County, Missouri, U.S.

Coordinates: 40°07′02″N 91°47′54″W

Blair Branch is a stream in Lewis County in the U.S. state of Missouri. It is a tributary of the Middle Fabius River.

Blair Branch has the name of Henry Blair, an early settler.

== See also ==
- List of rivers of Missouri
