= Gizzard Creek =

Stream in Wayne County, Missouri, U.S.

Coordinates: 37°14′06″N 90°15′36″W

Gizzard Creek is a stream in Wayne County in the U.S. state of Missouri. It is a tributary of Turkey Creek.

It is uncertain why the name "Gizzard" was applied to this creek.

== See also ==
- List of rivers of Missouri
