= Rock Branch (Huzzah Creek tributary) =

Stream in the American state of Missouri

Coordinates: 37°50′25″N 91°11′23″W

Rock Branch is a stream in the U.S. state of Missouri. It is a tributary of Huzzah Creek.

Rock Branch was named for the rocky character of its watercourse.

== See also ==
- List of rivers of Missouri
