= Searcy Branch =

Stream in the American state of Missouri

Coordinates: 39°09′07″N 94°31′01″W

Searcy Branch is a stream in Clay County in the U.S. state of Missouri.

Searcy Branch Stream is a little over 2 miles in length.

Searcy Branch was named after the local Searcy family.

== See also ==
- List of rivers of Missouri
