= Boyd Branch =

Stream in the U.S. state of Missouri

Coordinates: 38°03′37″N 90°25′23″W

Boyd Branch is a stream in Jefferson and St. Francois counties the U.S. state of Missouri. It is a tributary of Plattin Creek.

The stream headwaters arise in northern St. Francis County approximately one mile northeast of Halifax at . It flows to the northeast into southern Jefferson County and its confluence with Plattin Creek at .

Boyd Branch has the name of the original owner of the site. The creek is named for Alexander Boyd, an early pioneering settler who came to the area in the early years of the Missouri Territory. He was one of the original organizers of the first Presbyterian Church in Farmington, MO (1832) and was elected the first ruling elder. Previously, Mr. Boyd had previously been an elder of the first Board of Elders of the Bellevue Presbyterian Church.

== See also ==
- List of rivers of Missouri
