= Pisgah Branch =

Stream in the American state of Missouri

Coordinates: 39.272540°N 92.269066°W

Pisgah Branch is a stream in Audrain and Randolph Counties in the U.S. state of Missouri.

Pisgah Branch took its name from Pisgah Baptist Church.

== See also ==
- List of rivers of Missouri
