= Hilbert Branch =

Stream in the American state of Missouri

Coordinates: 40°08′48″N 91°51′12″W

Hilbert Branch is a stream in Lewis County in the U.S. state of Missouri.

Hilbert Branch was named for the fact a share of the first settlers in the area had the surname Hilbert.

== See also ==
- List of rivers of Missouri
