= Benton Creek =

Stream in the American state of Missouri

Location
- Countries: United States
- States: Missouri

Physical characteristics
- Source
  - coordinates: 37°46′27″N 91°31′14″W
- Mouth
  - coordinates: 37°53′30″N 91°30′21″W

Benton Creek is a stream in Phelps, Dent and Crawford counties in the Ozarks of Missouri.

The stream headwaters are in northern Dent County just north of Bangert and Missouri Route JJ. The stream meanders north into southwestern Crawford County and crosses under Missouri Route YY to the west of Cook Station. The stream continues north and is joined by the West Fork Benton Creek from Phelps County. It then continues north to its confluence with the Meramec River.

Benton Creek has the name of a local family.

== See also ==
- List of rivers of Missouri
