= Long Branch (Elkhorn Creek tributary) =

Stream in the American state of Missouri

Coordinates: 39.0742083°N 91.3545993°W

Long Branch is a stream in Montgomery County in the U.S. state of Missouri. It is a tributary of Elkhorn Creek.

Long Branch has the name of a pioneer citizen.

== See also ==
- List of rivers of Missouri
