= Lost Creek (Cuivre River tributary) =

Stream in the U.S. state of Missouri

Lost Creek is a stream in Audrain and Montgomery counties the U.S. state of Missouri. It is a tributary of the Cuivre River.

The headwaters of the stream are at 39°08′50″N 91°34′55″W and the confluence with the Cuivre is at 39°09′55″N 91°29′54″W.

Lost Creek was so named on account of its irregular course.

== See also ==
- List of rivers of Missouri
