= Hippo Branch =

Stream in the American state of Missouri

Hippo Branch is a stream in Ralls County in the U.S. state of Missouri. It is a tributary of Spencer Creek. The stream headwaters arise just southeast of Missouri Route 19 (at 39°27′29″N 91°34′47″W) and it flows east-southeast to its confluence with Spencer Creek one mile east of Madisonville (at 39°27′52″N 91°28′48″W).

According to tradition, "hippo" is a contraction of "hypochondria"; the story continues Hippo Branch was so named on account of a hypochondriac in the area.

== See also ==
- List of rivers of Missouri
