= Low Wassie Creek =

Stream in the American state of Missouri

Low Wassie Creek is a stream in northern Oregon County in the Ozarks of southern Missouri.

The stream headwaters are at 36°50′14″N 91°25′11″W and the confluence with Spring Creek is at 36°49′03″N 91°23′59″W.

Low Wassie Creek derives its name from the extinct community of Hiwassie.

== See also ==
- List of rivers of Missouri
