= McCalls Branch =

River in Missouri. USA

Coordinates: 38.2709°N 93.2827°W

McCalls Branch is a stream in Benton County in the U.S. state of Missouri.

McCalls Branch has the name of H. M. McCall, an early settler.

== See also ==
- List of rivers of Missouri
