= Kallambah Branch =

Stream in the US state of Missouri

Coordinates: 37°52′10″N 91°23′23″W

Kallambah Branch is a stream in Crawford County in the U.S. state of Missouri. It is a tributary of Crooked Creek. The stream headwaters arise in the Cooked Creek State Forest just north of Missouri Route VV and it flows to the northeast. The stream enters Crooked Creek just south of the community of Keysville.

The name Kallambah is derived from the surname of an early German citizen.

== See also ==
- List of rivers of Missouri
