= Blue Spring Creek =

Stream in the American state of Missouri

Coordinates: 38°15′15″N 92°38′56″W

Blue Spring Creek is a stream in eastern Morgan County and western Miller County in the U.S. state of Missouri. It is a tributary of Little Gravois Creek.

The stream headwaters arise about seven miles southwest of Eldon near Rocky Mount on Missouri Route Y at and it flows generally southeast to its confluence with Little Gravois at about three miles northwest of the community of Bagnell. Springs including Blue Spring occur about midway along the stream course near the Missouri Route Z crossing.

Blue Spring Creek is fed by a spring characterized by its blue water, hence the name.

== See also ==
- List of rivers of Missouri
