= Opossum Branch =

Stream in Missouri, US

Coordinates: 39.0583744°N 91.4146018°W

Opossum Branch is a stream in Montgomery County in the U.S. state of Missouri. It is a tributary of Elkhorn Creek.

Opossum Branch was so named on account of opossums in the area.

== See also ==
- List of rivers of Missouri
