= Pollard Branch =

Stream in Shelby County, Missouri, U.S.

Coordinates: 39.8355943°N 92.1012873°W

Pollard Branch (also called Pollards Branch) is a stream in Shelby County in the U.S. state of Missouri.

Pollard Branch has the name of Elijah Pollard, a pioneer settler.

== See also ==
- List of rivers of Missouri
