= Hawkins Branch =

Stream in the American state of Missouri

Coordinates: 40.0842083°N 91.9226713°W

Hawkins Branch is a stream in the U.S. state of Missouri.

Hawkins Branch has the name of the local Hawkins family.

== See also ==
- List of rivers of Missouri
