= Mattese Creek =

Stream in St. Louis County, Missouri, U.S.

Coordinates: 38.4550535°N 90.3367839°W

Mattese Creek is a stream in St. Louis County in the U.S. state of Missouri. It is a tributary of the Meramec River.

Mattese Creek most likely is a name derived from the French surname Matis.

== See also ==
- List of rivers of Missouri
