= Little Blue River (Missouri) =

Stream in Jackson County, Missouri

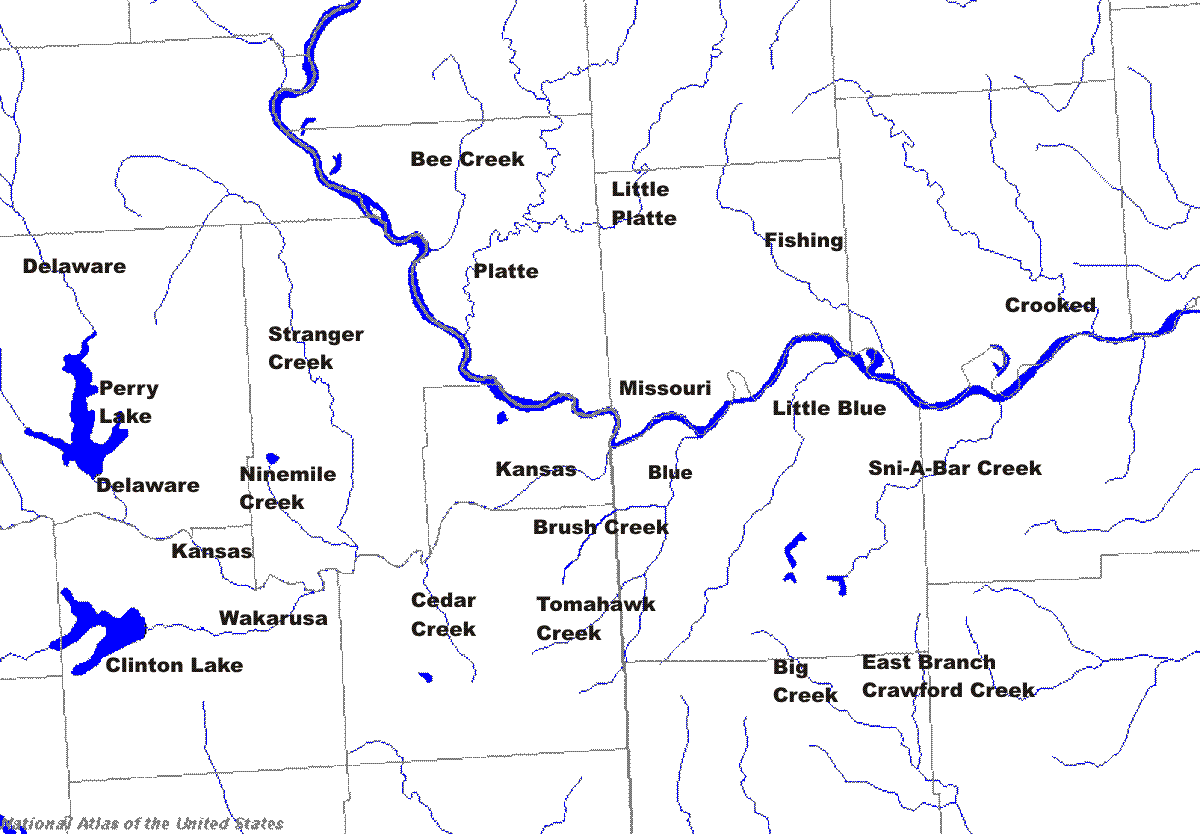
Kansas City metropolitan rivers

Little Blue River is a 45.4-mile-long (73.1 km) stream in Jackson County, Missouri, United States, that gave its name to the Battle of Little Blue River during the American Civil War. It rises in the Cass County town of Belton and empties into the Missouri River just west of the town of Sibley. The Little Blue was named for its smaller size relative to nearby Blue River.

At Lake City, Missouri, the river has a mean annual discharge of 167 cubic feet per second.

Longview Lake is a 930-acre (3.8 km^{2}) freshwater reservoir that was created by damming the river.

== Location ==
Mouth
Confluence with the Missouri River in Jackson County, Missouri: 39°12′28″N 94°13′07″W

Source
Cass County, Missouri: 38°50′06″N 94°32′08″W

== See also ==
- List of Missouri rivers
