= Sarvis Branch =

Stream in the American state of Missouri

Coordinates: 38.125863°N 93.143530°W

Sarvis Branch is a stream in Benton County in the U.S. state of Missouri.

The creek most likely was named after the sarvisberry along its course.

== See also ==
- List of rivers of Missouri
