= Wolf Branch (Big Lake Creek tributary) =

Stream in the American state of Missouri

Coordinates: 37°06′22″N 90°34′00″W

Wolf Branch is a stream in Wayne County in the U.S. state of Missouri. It is a tributary of Big Lake Creek.

Wolf Branch was so named on account of wolves in the area.

== See also ==
- List of rivers of Missouri
