= Hilton Branch =

- Location within Missouri
- Etymology: Named for early settler A. J. Hilton

Location
- Country: United States of America
- State: Missouri
- County: Shelby County

Physical characteristics
- Source
  - coordinates: 39°55′47″N 92°10′52″W
  - elevation: 820 feet (250 m)
- Mouth
  - coordinates: 39°54′15″N 92°11′05″W
  - elevation: 761 feet (232 m)

Basin features
- Progression: Hilton Branch → Black Creek → North Fork Salt River → Salt River → Mississippi River → Gulf of Mexico
- River system: Mississippi River

Hilton Branch is a stream in Shelby County in the U.S. state of Missouri. It is a tributary of Black Creek.

Hilton Branch has the name of A. J. Hilton, an early settler.

== See also ==
- List of rivers of Missouri
