= Merrell Branch =

Stream in the American state of Missouri

Coordinates: 36.522283°N 90.820954°W

Merrell Branch is a stream in Ripley County in the U.S. state of Missouri.

Merrell Branch has the name of James and John Merrell, pioneer citizens.

== See also ==
- List of rivers of Missouri
