= Lost Creek (Courtois Creek tributary) =

Stream in the US state of Missouri

Lost Creek is a stream in Crawford and Washington counties in the U.S. state of Missouri. It is a tributary of Courtois Creek.

The headwaters are located at 37°51′21″N 90°54′27″W and the confluence with Courtois Creek is at 37°55′02″N 91°06′04″W.

Lost Creek most likely was named for its status as a losing stream.

== See also ==
- List of rivers of Missouri
