= Greater St. Louis Area Council =

Regional organization of Scouting BSA

Greater St. Louis Area Council (#312)
- Owner: Scouting America
- Headquarters: 1122 Town and Country Commons Drive; Suite 200; St. Louis, Missouri 63017
- Location: Missouri, Illinois
- Country: United States
- Founded: 1911
- Membership: about 25,000 total youth served (2024)
- President: Karen Vangyia
- Council Commissioner: Ron Stephens
- Scout Executive/CEO: Joe Sadewasser
- Website www.stlbsa.org

The Greater St. Louis Area Council (GSLAC) of Scouting America was formed in 1911 and is based in St. Louis, Missouri. The council serves Scouts in the St. Louis Metro area, southeast Missouri, and southern and central Illinois.

The council had about 25,000 youth enrolled in its programs as of 2024.

== History ==
GSLAC was formed in 1911 as the Saint Louis Council, BSA.

In September 2016 the Lewis and Clark Council voted to merge with GSLAC, effective January 1, 2017. In September 2018, the Lincoln Trails Council voted to merge into GSLAC, and this took effect January 1, 2019.

Until 2021, GSLAC was part of the BSA's Central Region. With the adoption of National Service Territories in June 2021, GSLAC became a member of NST 5, now known as Council Service Territory 5.

In October 2025, the council service center relocated from the Central West End neighborhood of St. Louis to suburban Town and Country.

== Administration ==
The council employs Professional Scouters and support staff, who serve under the direction of the Scout executive. Each district in the council is served by a district executive or district associate. Larger districts are served by a district director and one or more district executives.

The council's program department is tasked with executing camping, STEM, training, advancement, and activity operations year-round. Each summer, seasonal camp staff are hired to run summer camp programs for Scouts BSA and Cub Scout youth members. GSLAC owns and operates six camp properties:

- S-F Scout Ranch, Farmington, MO
- Beaumont Scout Reservation, High Ridge, MO
- Camp Lewallen, Silva, MO
- Camp Warren Levis, Godfrey, IL
- Camp Pine Ridge, Makanda, IL
- Rhodes-France Scout Reservation, Pana, IL

The volunteer council executive board is made up of influential business and economic leaders from the council's territory and meets throughout the year, serving as the governing body for the organization.

In addition to its headquarters in Town and Country, the council also operates field service centers in Cape Girardeau, Herrin, and Decatur.

== District Organization ==
GSLAC has 22 districts and a community outreach program. Each district serves to deliver Scouting programs in its assigned territory and is led by a professional staff member and volunteer committee.

District	Areas served
Arrowhead	All of Macon, Moultrie, Shelby counties and part of Christian County in Illinois
Big Muddy	All of Alexander, Jackson, Johnson, Perry, Pulaski, and Union counties in Illinois
Black Gold	All of Clay, Fayette, Jefferson, Marion, Washington, Wayne counties, and part of Clinton County in Illinois
Boone Trails	All of Lincoln, St. Charles and Warren counties in Missouri
Cahokia Mounds	Most of Madison and Bond counties in Illinois
Cherokee	All of Dunklin, Pemiscot, Mississippi and New Madrid counties, and part of Scott and Stoddard counties in Missouri
Community Outreach	No specific geographic area; serves Scouts in areas with limited volunteers
Egyptian	All of Franklin, Hamilton, Saline and Williamson counties in Illinois
Gravois Trail	Southern St. Louis County in Missouri
Illini	Part of St. Clair and Madison counties in Illinois, primarily around East St. Louis
Kaskaskia	All of Monroe and Randolph counties, and part of St. Clair County in Illinois
Keystone	City of St. Louis, Missouri. Until 2020, Keystone was two districts: Grand Towers (north) and Thunderbird (south)
New Horizons	Western St. Louis County in Missouri
North Star	Northern St. Louis County in Missouri
Osage	All of Franklin and Crawford counties, and part of Warren County in Missouri
Ozark Trailblazers	All of Iron, Madison, Reynolds, St. Francis, and Ste. Genevieve counties, and part of Reynolds County in Missouri
Pathfinder	Central St. Louis County in Missouri
Piasa Bird	Parts of Calhoun, Greene, Jersey, Macoupin and Madison counties in Illinois
Redhawk	All of Clark, Coles, Crawford, Cumberland, Effingham and Jasper counties, and part of Edgar County in Illinois
River Trails	All of Jefferson County in Missouri
Shawnee	All of Bollinger, Cape Giradeau and Perry counties, and parts of Scott and Stoddard counties in Missouri
Sioux	All of Butler, Carter, Ripley, and Wayne counties, and parts of Reynolds and Stoddard counties in Missouri
Soaring Eagle	Parts of Clinton and St. Clair counties in Illinois

== Camps ==
=== Beaumont Scout Reservation ===
Beaumont Scout Reservation
- Location: High Ridge, Missouri
- Coordinates: 38.4886°N 90.5448°W
- Founded: 1954

The Beaumont Scout Reservation is 2,400 acres (9.7 km^{2}) of Scout property operated by GSLAC. It is located in High Ridge, Missouri.

==== History ====
The property for Beaumont was acquired during the late 1940s. It was dedicated in 1954. The property was the beginning of the period of transition for the St. Louis Council that would continue to 1965 with the dedication of the S-F Scout Ranch and the sale of the Irondale Scout Reservation, Lion's Den, and Bereton Explorer Base. Beaumont's summer camp is known as Camp May. Camp May was opened as a Boy Scout Camp and served in that capacity until the mid-1980s when its summer programs were redesigned to primarily serve Cub Scouts.

==== Camps and facilities ====
Within Beaumont, there are many campsites and camporee areas, as well hiking trails, climbing tower, low and high ropes course, rifle range, shotgun range, Scoutmaster's chapel, maintenance building and ranger's station, ranger homes, a mud cave, multiple cabins, and Sverdrup lodge.

===== Camp Grizzly and Cub World =====
Camp Grizzly is a Cub Scout area which includes a program hall, multiple pavilions and campsites, an activity field, a council ring, and Cub World, which is a playground area that is geared towards Cub Scouts and their families. Cub world hosts many day camps each summer including Grizzly Camp, which is the council's day camp experience. Grizzly camp includes time at the pool, adult supervision, and a hot lunch every day.

===== Camp May =====
Camp May is a Webelos camp that conducts Webelos week-long and Webelos Mini-camp each summer. Some of the facilities are used for other purposes in the off-season. Camp May contains numerous campsites, a pool and shower houses, a dining hall and education facility, a council ring, a trading post, an activity field, a gazebo, a Scoutcraft cabin, an archery a BB gun range, a rifle range, a shotgun range, a nature lodge, and a flag field. Camp May was originally a Boy Scout Camp when Beaumont first opened in 1954. It was founded to help relieve the over crowded Camps Irondale and Lions Den. With the purchase and popularity of S-F Scout Ranch, the council found themselves struggling to fill weeks of camp at Camp May. To solve the problem, the council needed to find another use for the camp during the summer. In the late 1970s a Cub Scout residential camp pilot program was launched at Camp May. It was so successful that soon Camp May was entirely dedicated to running the program. The Webelos programs offered include a full week and mini week experience. In the mid-1990s Camp May had up to 10 weeks of Cub Scout residential camp in operation during a single summer.

===== Emerson Center =====
Wright Lodge, the original dining hall that had been built with the original purchase of the property, was closed for renovations in August 2004. The building was expanded making more room in the dining hall and adding more training space. The office and kitchen spaces were modernized to meet the present needs of the camp. The lodge reopened in June 2005 as the Beaumont Dining and Education Facility. At the council's annual meeting in 2009, it was announced that the building was to be renamed in honor of Emerson Electric Co, which had made a large donation to the council. In September 2009, the center was re-dedicated as the Emerson Center.

Nagel Explorer Base

Nagel Explorer Base is at the east of Beaumont and is primarily used for Exploring and Venturing programs It is also host's the council's horse camp for one week, annually. Its facilities include adirondacks, a program hall, a rifle range, shotgun range, a horse stable, a program field, a large program pavilion, a horse corral, and an equipment building.

=== S-F Scout Ranch ===
S-F Scout Ranch
- Location: Knob Lick, Missouri
- Coordinates: 37.650°N 90.344°W
- Founded: September 11, 1965

The S-F Scout Ranch or "S Bar F" or "The Ranch" as it is commonly known, is owned and operated by GSLAC. It is located in Knob Lick, Missouri, which is about 12 miles (19 km) south of Farmington, Missouri. The 5,200-acre (21 km^{2}) property sits in St. Francois County, Missouri and Madison County, Missouri. In its center sits Nim's Lake, and running through it is the Little St. Francis River.

==== History ====
A large portion of the former 37,000 acres (150 km^{2}) of mine and farm lands owned by the Mine La Motte Company, later the Missouri Metals Corporation, was acquired by the St. Louis Area Council in 1961 through the efforts of the St. Joseph Lead Company and Mr. Elver A. Jones, and an initial gift of the Stix, Baer & Fuller Company by Mr. Arthur B. Baer. The name S-F was derived from the St. Louis department store Stix, Baer and Fuller due to their contribution to help buy the property. The property was dedicated during the Shawnee Lodge fall reunion on September 11, 1965, and opened for summer camp in 1966. The need for this Ranch became imminent as a result of the long range plan conducted by the council in 1959 and 1960. This plan, which encompassed a study of the traditional camp facilities of the council such as Camps Irondale, Lion's Den and Brereton, pointed out the need for an area that would be large enough for the council to grow on, and an area large enough to expand the program facilities on, and an area rich enough in history and tradition to offer the incentive for the Scouts of today and tomorrow. The property replaced the Irondale Scout Reservation in nearby Ironton, Missouri which had become too small to serve the needs of the growing Scout Council. Three of the four camps that operate on the property today were a part of the original dedication. Camp Gamble was dedicated on June 17, 1970.

Camp Famous Eagle

Camp Famous Eagle was the first camp to be built. It opened in the summer of 1966. It was named for Morton D. May who was the chairman of the committee to develop the ranch. May had been a huge force in developing the Beaumont Scout Reservation ten years earlier. Because of his efforts the camp at Beaumont was named Camp May. Due to this fact the camp at S-F took the name Camp Famous Eagle, Famous for Famous-Barr (part of the May Department Stores) and Eagle for Eagle Trading Stamps, an in-store promotions at the time. The Fe abbreviation for the camp is also an homage to Camp Irondale through the chemical symbol of iron. A dining hall facility was added to Camp Famous Eagle, opening for the 2015 summer camp season.

Camp Sakima

Camp Sakima was the second camp to be built, finishing in time for the first week of campers in the summer of 1966. Camp Sakima is named in recognition of Leif J. Sverdrup who headed the campaign to raise the funds for the Ranch to be built.

Camp Sakima was last open as a full camp in 2007. It has been used for the National Youth Leader Training (NYLT) program since 2008.

John S. Swift Base

The John S. Swift Base also opened in the summer of 1966. It was originally the only camp on the property with a dining hall. It was designed for a high adventure based camp to implement the year-long Exploring program, which would later become the Venturing Program. It is named for John S. Swift, who was the owner of Swift Printing Company. He believed in the value of the Scouting program so much that when approached by the committee to create the Ranch for funds, he happily donated the amount needed for the base.

Camp Theodore R. Gamble

Camp Gamble was dedicated on June 17, 1970. It was built to meet the need of more space for boy scouts that was a result of growing boy scout membership in the 1960s. It was named in memory of Theodore R Gamble who was serving as president of the Council when he died. He was also president of the Pet Milk Company.

Eugene D. Nims Lake

The S-F Scout Ranch is home to the second largest privately owned man-made lake in the state of Missouri. The lake is part of the aquatic program. When the land for the Ranch was discovered it did not have a lake. Mrs. Nims stepped in and donated the $55,000 (how much would this be in 2025 currency) needed to dam the Wills Branch of the Little St. Francois River. She donated the money to build the lake in name and memory of her late husband Eugene D. Nims, the founder of Southwestern Bell Telephone. The first attempt to dam the river failed. Sverdurp engineers designed a second dam that created the 270-acre (1.1 km^{2}) lake. The lake has six miles (10 km) of shore line and seven coves.

The Water Treatment Plant

The drinking water on the property comes from the lake. It is treated in a plant located at the Swift Base. The plant is considered a Class C plant by the Missouri Department of Natural Resources. If operated at capacity, the plant could serve a town of 10–15,000 people. The treatment process has undergone many renovations in recent years. It was replaced by a membrane system which went online in 2011.

==== Programs and activities ====
===== Scouts BSA week-long residential camp =====
Camp Famous Eagle and Camp Gamble operate Scouts BSA overnight summer camps.

===== Venturing week-long adventure camp =====
The Swift Base run programs for Venturers, the BSA's co-ed program for individuals between the ages of 14 and 21. A typical week for a Swift camper might include rock climbing and rappelling, challenge course, rifle, shotgun, and pistol shooting, horseback riding, water skiing, tubing, wake boarding, knee boarding, mountain biking, and many other fun activities. Venturers are given the opportunity to choose which activities they wish to participate in on a daily basis. Swift is one of only a couple camps in the country running a dedicated Venturing summer camp.

===== Parent N' Pal =====
A short program lasting about 22 hours that provides a brief introduction to outdoor Scout camping for Cub Scouts and an adult partner. Held twice every summer at all of the camps at the Ranch. Held once a summer at Camp Lewallen.

===== National Youth Leadership Training (NYLT) =====
A week long training program six weeks out of every summer by the Council Training Department. It is based on a national syllabus.

===== Ranger program =====
A traditional program for older Scouts, the Ranger program gets Scouts deep into the backwoods of the undeveloped east side of the property. Scouts are given the opportunity to see parts of the property that they would never get to see, all the while participating in a mountain man style program. Scouts may expect to stay at a new campsite each night and construct a different shelter daily. Activities may include blacksmithing, black-powder rifle shooting, tomahawk throwing, candle making, canoeing, swimming, a Native American-style sweat lodge, fishing, hiking, and many other activities. Scouts who attend the Ranger program learn leadership and team-building skills by working together throughout the week to overcome obstacles.

===== Other programs =====
Each summer other Scout programs are held. Examples include, Catholic Adventure Week, LDS Scout Camp, Shooting Sports Camp, Fishing Camp, and Horse Camp.

===== Camp operation =====
Each of the Ranch's camps has a camp director. Each camp has a program director that is the second in command to the camp director. The program director oversees merit badge instruction, campsite program, as well as evening programs that are put on by the staff. The business manager oversees the administration of the camp. There are two commissioners that oversee campsite programs put on by the troop counselors, facilitates leaders meetings, and addresses problems as they come up. The Commissary manager and an assistant run the food service operation in the camp, and the trading post manager and an assistant run the camp store. In addition, the trading post staff assists with food service for the staff. The rest of the staff is divided into program areas. Each area has a director and a certain number of counselors.

===== Swift High Adventure Base =====
Given the very different nature of Swift High Adventure Base, the staff is structured differently. Similar to the Scout camps, Swift has a camp director, as well as a program director, and business manager. The business manager directly runs the camp office and trading post, as well as oversees the kitchen staff of two. The program director oversees the rest of the staff of the camp including a field sports director, aquatics director, and wrangler. The rest of the staff serves as program counselors, generally rotating between program sites including rock climbing, rappelling, high challenge course, low challenge course, aquatics area, and ski/tube boat driving. These program counselors also serve as the campsite counselors for the five campsites.

=== Camp Lewallen ===
Camp Lewallen
- Location: Silva, Missouri
- Coordinates: 37.235°N 90.487°W
- Founded: 1935
- Website http://www.stlbsa.org

Camp Lewallen is 580 acres (2.3 km^{2}) of Boy Scout summer camp property owned and operated by GSLAC. It is located in Silva, Missouri. Camp Lewallen officially opened as a long-term summer camp in 1936, and was built on land previously owned by the Lewis L. Lewallen Family. The original camp consisted of 50 acres that was purchased from the Lewallen family in 1935 and named Camp Logan, but was renamed Camp Lewallen a year later after an additional 240 acres was donated by the family. The camp property was expanded in later years.

=== Defunct ===
==== Irondale Scout Reservation ====
Irondale Scout Reservation was founded in Irondale, Missouri, in 1920. Scouts first started camping in the area in 1913, when it was known as Grenia Springs. Later it would be called Camp Roosevelt, but the Camp Irondale name was adopted in 1920, when land was donated to the St. Louis Council by Clarance Howard.

Legend has it that Camp Irondale built the first Olympic-sized swimming pool not built for the Olympics. The pool opened in 1945 and replaced the previously used spring-fed pool. A crack formed in the pool in the 1970s after the pool was in the city of Irondale's control and the pool was rendered unusable. Camp Irondale also had a chapel called Inspiration Hall to serve the Scouts' religious needs. It has red granite walls and a gravel floor bordered with flagstone.

The camp was closed and sold in 1965 at the end of the summer camp season. The property was sold to a real estate developer and has been developed into a small subdivision, although many features of the camp remain. The climbing tower, water tower, two lakes, many cabins, the chapel, a post office building, a small pavilion, the parade grounds and flag pole, the new pool that opened in 1946, and the springs that were used to create the old swimming pool. There are also 5–15 old buildings including cabins, nature lodge, and the Scoutmaster's quarters. The old camp is currently under a very slow renovation. A state grant of approximately $90,000 will be needed to fix the Olympic-sized pool and create a new filtration system. The city of Irondale can't afford to fix it by itself and it may not be cost effective for the small town. The Chapel at Irondale has recently been remodeled and rededicated to the city by the Cub Scouts of Pack 697 and Boy Scouts of Troop 697.

In 2010 the Ozark Trailblazers District worked all spring and summer to try to restore parts of the old camp that the city of Irondale still owns. The recreation hall was partly restored, the pool was cleaned of brush and trees, several campsites were created, and camp signs were placed around the camp.

== Council Programs ==
=== Activities ===
The council's activities committee and other volunteers organize several events throughout the year, including:

- Pinewood derby race in spring
- Scouting for Food drive in November
- Council Recognition Dinner, typically held in May
- Memorial Day Good Turn
- Cub Launch

=== Exploring ===
In addition to the traditional Cub Scouts, Scouts BSA, Venturing and Sea Scouts programs, GSLAC also offers several Exploring units sponsored by local hospitals, police departments, and other entities.

An annual Exploring dinner is held to celebrate the program and its partners, and awards are given out to outstanding Explorers.

=== STEM ===
GSLAC has a council-wide STEM Committee, as well as committees in many districts. The councils hosts a STEM Camp each summer at Beaumont.

In addition, the council owns a STEM trailer and van. These include programs like stomp rockets, snap circuits, ozobots, rover robots, sphero robots, 3D pens, hand held microscopes, vortex cannons, and more.

Several STEM universities are also held year-round, where Cub Scouts and Scouts BSA members can complete STEM-based advancement requirements and Nova awards.

=== Order of the Arrow ===
The council is served by four Order of the Arrow lodges: Shawnee Lodge, which serves the Greater St. Louis Metro area, Anpetu-We Lodge which serves southeast Missouri and southern Illinois, Nisha Kittan Lodge which serves southern Illinois and Woapink Lodge which serves central Illinois.

The council is one of the only BSA councils that is home to more than one Order of the Arrow Lodge. Upon completion of the mergers of the early 1990s, it was decided that the council was geographically too large to administer one Order of the Arrow program. The decision was made to merge the Ney-a-Ti lodge, from the Egyptian Council with the Anpetu-We Lodge, and make two lodges within the council.

With the Lewis and Clark Council merging into GSLAC on January 1, 2017, Nisha Kittan Lodge became the council's third lodge. GSLAC submitted a resolution to change the Order of the Arrow's "One Lodge, One Council" policy. In February 2017, the National Council declined to adopt the resolution and asked GSLAC to merge Shawnee, Anpetu-We, and Nisha Kittan lodges into one new lodge, but this never occurred.

On January 1, 2019, the Lincoln Trails Council in central Illinois merged into GSLAC. Woapink Lodge became the fourth lodge to serve GSLAC. All four lodges are still chartered by the national office.

==== Anpetu-We Lodge ====
Anpetu-We Lodge
- Founded: 1956
- Lodge Chief: Wade A.
- Lodge Adviser: David Smiley
- Lodge Staff Adviser: Tom Kroenung Jr.
- Website http://www.anpetu-we.org

The Order of the Arrow existed at Camp Lewallen prior to the Anpetu-We Lodge. Jonito-Otora (Beaver Club) Lodge No. 100 was chartered to the Southeast Missouri Council on April 5, 1937. At that time, the Order of the Arrow was not endorsed by the Boy Scouts of America, and Jonito Otora was disbanded in 1939 in favor of a similar organization called the Golden Sun. The Golden Sun Honor Society was an integral part of Camp Lewallen. The Golden Sun Warrior Circle still remains and is used as the Ordeal ceremony ring. The Golden Sun was disbanded in 1956 to allow the rechartering of an Order of the Arrow Lodge. The Order of the Arrow was by this time endorsed by the National Council as the official honor camping society, and all councils were encouraged to comply. The Southeast Missouri Council was allowed to keep the number 100 for its lodge number, but the youth members chose to change the name to Anpetu-We, meaning "rising sun". This was a tribute to the former Golden Sun Honor Society. The Anpetu-We Lodge was chartered on March 5, 1956. When the Southeast Missouri Council merged with the St. Louis Area Council in 1993, the Anpetu-We Lodge was allowed to exist within GSLAC. The Egyptian Council of Southern Illinois merged with GSLAC in 1994. The youth members of the Ney-A-Ti Lodge No. 240, voted to join the Anpetu-We Lodge

===== Chapters =====
Anpetu-We Lodge is divided into five chapters. They are listed below.

- Cherokee
- Egyptian
- Shawnee
- Sioux
- Big Muddy

==== Shawnee Lodge ====
Shawnee Lodge
- Founded: 1930
- Lodge Chief: Max K.
- Lodge Adviser: Tim Weaver
- Lodge Staff Adviser: Matt Kaufman
- Website http://www.shawneelodge.org

The Shawnee Lodge was formed in 1930 and celebrated its 90th anniversary in 2020. It is a large lodge of approximately 1900 registered members and often draws over 1000 members to its annual Fall Reunion. Several of its members have risen to national positions during its history. In 1986 Steve Meinhold was elected to be the North Central Region Chief, becoming the first Shawnee Lodge member to hold a national position. In 2006, Russ Bresnahan was elected to serve as the central region chief. In the year 2009 Jack O'Neill served as National Chief, the first Shawnee Lodge member to hold that position. Jack served as section vice chief for one year and Section Chief for two years before being elected National Chief. He was a member of the council's Summer Camp staff. He was a part of the Shawnee Lodge Vigil Class of 2008 and is an Eagle Scout from Troop 169, at Assumption Parish in South St. Louis County. In October 2022, the former Shawnee Lodge Chief, Matthew Caldwell, was elected as the first G7 Section Chief. He was re-elected in October 2023 to fulfill a second term, the first from Shawnee to do so since O'Neill. With hopes of higher office in the year of a Shawnee Lodge Hosted Conclave, he ran for a third term at the 2024 Section G7 Conclave, hosted by Illini Lodge, where he lost in a narrow 14:15 vote. Former Lodge Chief, Neil Maxwell, was elected as Section Vice Chief at this conclave and is currently serving his term through Section Conclave 2025.

===== Programs =====
- Camp Promotion: The lodge sends members to troops and packs to promote the council's summer camping opportunities.
- Lodge Newsletters: The lodge sends out "eLookouts" with updates about the lodge around once a month.

===== Chapters =====
The Shawnee Lodge is made up of nine chapters. Each chapter represents a district within GSLAC.

- Boone Trails
- Gravois Trail
- New Horizons
- North Star
- Osage
- Ozark Trailblazers
- Pathfinder
- River Trails
- Keystone

==== Nisha Kittan Lodge ====
Nisha Kittan Lodge
- Founded: 2009
- Lodge Chief: Becca B.
- Lodge Adviser: Patricia Keithley
- Website http://nishakittan.org/

===== Chapters =====
Nisha Kittan Lodge is divided into six chapters. They are listed below.

- Black Gold
- Cahokia Mounds
- Illini
- Kaskaskia
- Piasa Bird
- Soaring Eagle

==== Woapink Lodge ====
Woapink Lodge
- Founded: 1955
- Lodge Chief: Blake G.
- Lodge Adviser: Shawn Renfro
- Lodge Staff Adviser: Matt Kaufman
- Website https://woapink.org/

===== Chapters =====
Woapink Lodge is divided into two chapters. Each chapter represents a district within GSLAC. They are listed below.

- Arrowhead
- Redhawk

== See also ==
- Scouting in Illinois
- Scouting in Missouri
- List of councils (Boy Scouts of America)
- List of council camps (Boy Scouts of America)
