= Baker Branch =

Stream in Missouri, U.S.

Coordinates: 39°29′48″N 92°14′25″W

Baker Branch is a stream in Monroe County in the U.S. state of Missouri. It is a tributary of Flat Creek.

Baker Branch has the name of Elisha Baker, an early citizen.

== See also ==
- List of rivers of Missouri
