= Ely Creek =

Stream in the U.S. state of Missouri

Coordinates: 39.598098°N 91.579601°W

Ely Creek is a stream in Ralls County in the U.S. state of Missouri. It is a tributary of Salt River.

Ely Creek has the name of Isaac Ely, a pioneer citizen.

== See also ==
- List of rivers of Missouri
