= Julian Branch =

Stream in the American state of Missouri

Coordinates: 37°07′18″N 90°34′12″W

Julian Branch is a stream in Wayne County in the U.S. state of Missouri. It is a tributary of Big Lake Creek.

Julian Branch has the name of the local Julian family.

== See also ==
- List of rivers of Missouri
