= Hutchison Branch =

Stream in the American state of Missouri

Coordinates: 38.8369676°N 92.7988024°W

Hutchison Branch is a stream in Cooper County in the U.S. state of Missouri.

Hutchison Branch was named after one Mr. Hutchinson, an early settler.

== See also ==
- List of rivers of Missouri
