= Bourgawich Branch =

Stream in the American state of Missouri

Coordinates: 38.0500494°N 90.8262436°W

Bourgawich Branch is a stream in Washington County in the U.S. state of Missouri. A tributary of Mineral Fork, it was named after an early settler of German ancestry.

== See also ==
- List of rivers of Missouri
