= Pryors Branch =

Stream in the American state of Missouri

Coordinates: 38°38′57″N 91°17′42″W

Pryors Branch is a stream in Franklin County in the U.S. state of Missouri. It is a tributary of Big Berger Creek.

Pryors Branch most likely has the name of William Pryor, a pioneer settler.

== See also ==
- List of rivers of Missouri
