= Crabapple Creek =

Stream in Ray County, Missouri, U.S.

Coordinates: 39.4200149°N 93.7874370°W

Crabapple Creek is a stream in Ray County in the U.S. state of Missouri. It is a tributary of Wakenda Creek.

Crabapple Creek was so named on account of crabapple timber in the area.

== See also ==
- List of rivers of Missouri
