= Taff Branch =

Stream in the U.S. state of Missouri

Taff Branch is a stream in southern Crawford County in the U.S. state of Missouri. It is a tributary of the Meramec River.

The stream headwaters arise just north of the Crawford-Dent county line and west of Missouri Route 19 at 37°47′39″N 91°22′36″W. The stream flows to the northwest for approximately three miles to its confluence with the Meramec at 37°49′14″N 91°25′55″W.

Taff Branch has the name of the local Taff family.

== See also ==
- List of rivers of Missouri
