= Round Grove Creek =

Stream in Jackson County, Missouri, U.S.

Coordinates: 39.046394°N 94.505787°W

Round Grove Creek is a stream in Jackson County in the U.S. state of Missouri.

Round Grove Creek was named for a round grove of trees along its course. It empties into the Blue River.

== See also ==
- List of rivers of Missouri
