= Rollins Creek (Ray County, Missouri) =

Stream in the American state of Missouri

Coordinates: 39.184176°N 94.038834°W

Rollins Creek is a stream in Ray County in the U.S. state of Missouri.

Rollins Creek has the name of the local Rollins family.

== See also ==
- List of rivers of Missouri
