= Hardin Creek =

Stream in Missouri, US

Hardin Creek is a stream in Randolph and Monroe counties in the U.S. state of Missouri, within the Salt River basin of northeast Missouri.

== Course ==
According to historical place-name records, the stream rises in Prairie Township in southern Randolph County and flows generally southeast into Monroe County, where it enters Union Township and joins Milligan Creek near the community of Middle Grove. A mapped point along the stream is at 39.377538°N 92.2999005°W on the USGS Middle Grove quadrangle.

== Name ==
The watercourse has also been recorded historically as Hardin's Creek and bears the name of Benjamin Hardin, an early settler in the area.

== See also ==
Salt River (Missouri)

List of rivers of Missouri
