= Bass Branch =

Stream in Missouri, U.S.

Coordinates: 38°01′11″N 91°11′04″W

Bass Branch is a stream in Crawford County in the U.S. state of Missouri. It is a tributary of Doss Branch which enters Courtois Creek approximately 1000 feet to the west.

Bass Branch most likely has the name of Roland Bass, an early settler.

== See also ==
- List of rivers of Missouri
