= Aslinger Branch =

Stream in Missouri, U.S.

Coordinates: 37°26′18.6″N 90°10′39.6″W

Aslinger Branch is a stream in Madison County, Missouri. It is a tributary of the Castor River.

Aslinger Branch has the name of the local Aslinger family.

== See also ==
- List of rivers of Missouri
