= Snowden Branch =

Stream in the American state of Missouri

Coordinates: 37°29′58″N 90°11′35″W

Snowden Branch is a stream in Madison County in the U.S. state of Missouri. It is a tributary of Indian Creek.

Snowden Branch has the name of Professor J. F. Snowden, the original owner of the site.

== See also ==
- List of rivers of Missouri
