= Plumb Branch =

Stream in the American state of Missouri

Coordinates: 39.941412°N 93.049647°W

Plumb Branch (also known as Plum Branch) is a stream in Linn County in the U.S. state of Missouri.

Plumb Branch was named for the wild plum timber near its course.

== See also ==
- List of rivers of Missouri
