= Cragg Branch =

Stream in Lafayette County, Missouri, U.S.

Coordinates: 39.1614068°N 93.5588241°W

Cragg Branch (also called Craig Branch) is a stream in Lafayette County in the U.S. state of Missouri.

Cragg Branch derives its name from Robert Craig, original owner of the site.

== See also ==
- List of rivers of Missouri
