= Persimmon Branch =

Stream in the American state of Missouri

Coordinates: 37.1047736°N 90.5640053°W

Persimmon Branch is a stream in Wayne County in the U.S. state of Missouri. It is a tributary of Big Lake Creek.

Persimmon Branch was so named on account of persimmon timber near its course.

== See also ==
- List of rivers of Missouri
