= Harman Creek =

Stream in the U.S. state of Missouri

Harman Creek (also called Harmon Branch) is a stream in Crawford County in the U.S. state of Missouri. It is a tributary of the Meramec River.

The stream source area lies just south of Missouri Route 8 about one mile east of the community of Elayer. The stream joins the Meramec about two miles south-southeast of Onondaga Cave State Park.

The headwaters are at 37°58′02″N 91°16′02″W and the confluence with the Meramec is at 38°01′56″N 91°14′28″W.

Harman Creek has the name of the local Harman family.

== See also ==
- List of rivers of Missouri
