= Strawberry Branch =

Stream in the American state of Missouri

Coordinates: 39.865578°N 93.230207°W

Strawberry Branch is a stream in Linn County in the U.S. state of Missouri.

Strawberry Branch was named for wild strawberries near its course.

== See also ==
- List of rivers of Missouri
