= Wolf Creek (Elkhorn Creek tributary) =

Stream in the American state of Missouri

Coordinates: 39°03′35″N 91°21′52″W

Wolf Creek is a stream in Montgomery County in the U.S. state of Missouri. It is a tributary of Elkhorn Creek.

Wolf Creek was so named on account of wolves in the area.

== See also ==
- List of rivers of Missouri
