= Elkhorn Creek (Nodaway River tributary) =

Stream in northwest Missouri, U.S.

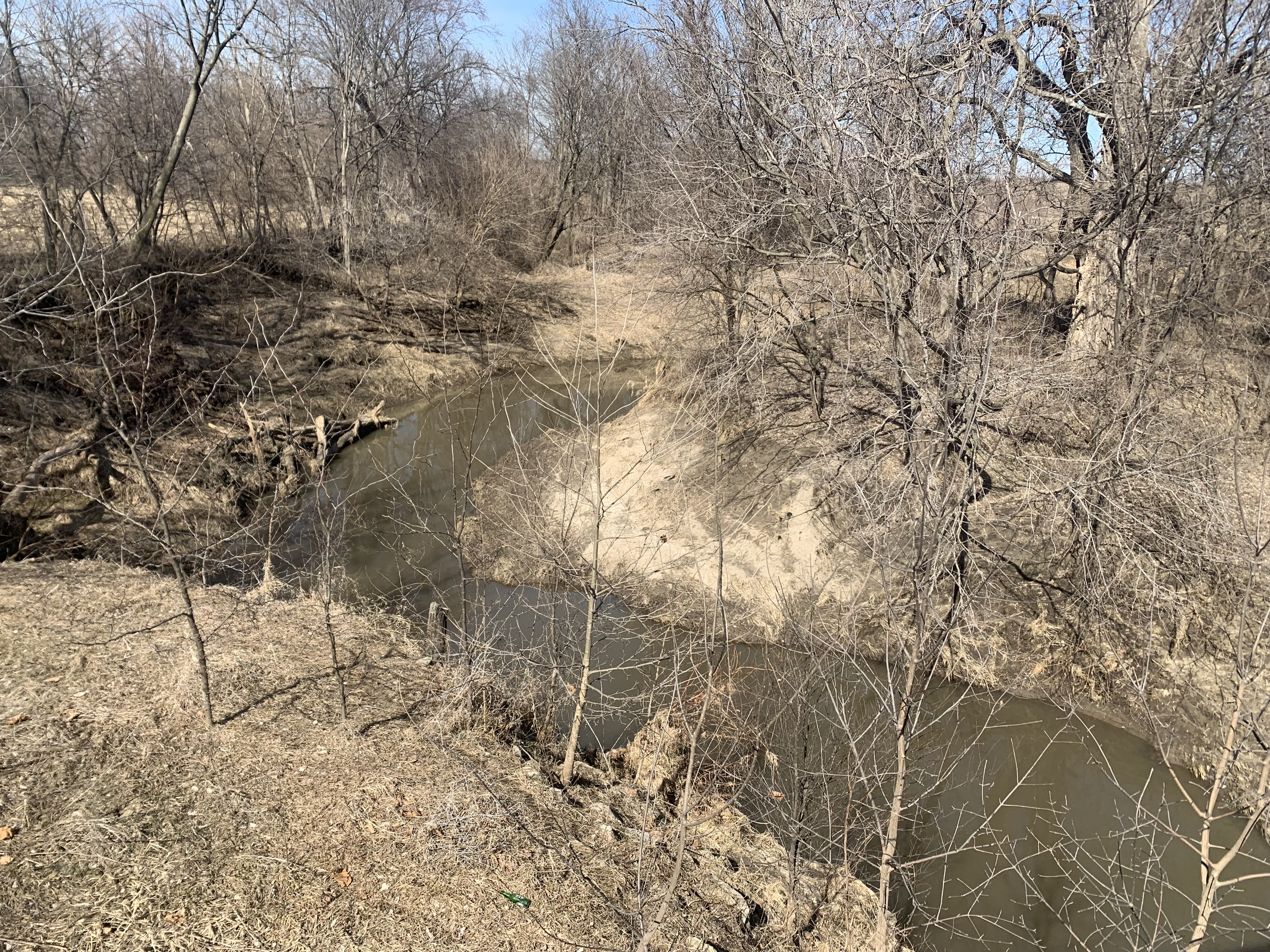
- Elkhorn Creek on Route A bridge in Hughes Township east of Graham

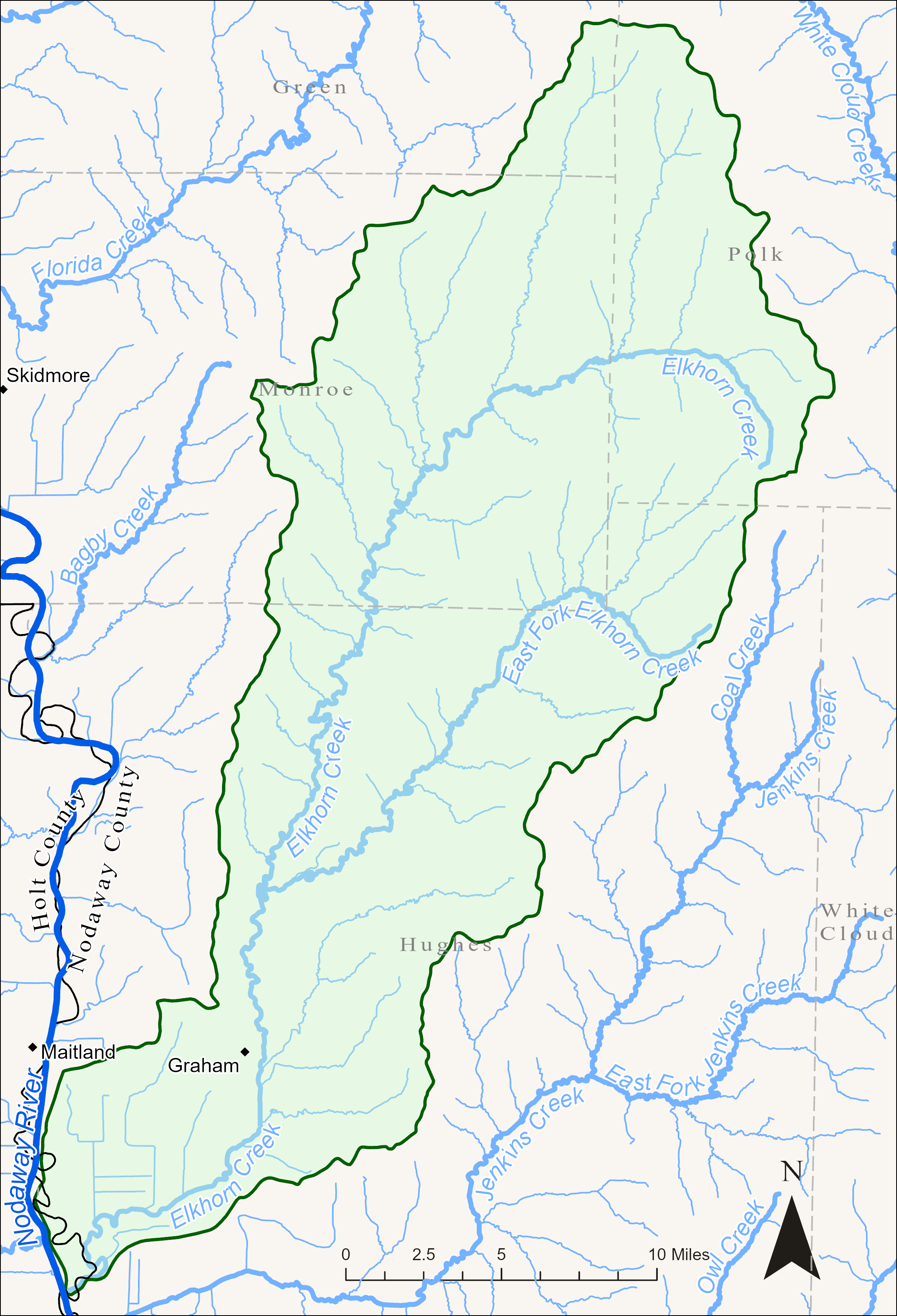
- Watershed map of Elkhorn Creek

Location
- Country: United States
- State: Missouri
- County: Nodaway

Physical characteristics
- Source
  - location: Polk Township
  - coordinates: 40°16′48″N 94°56′33″W
  - elevation: 1,100 ft (340 m)
- Mouth: Nodaway River
  - location: Hughes Township
  - coordinates: 40°10′29″N 95°03′46″W
  - elevation: 860 ft (260 m)
- Length: 18.5 mi (29.8 km)
- Basin size: 36.59 sq mi (94.8 km^{2})

Basin features
- Progression: Elkhorn Creek → Nodaway River → Missouri River → Mississippi River → Atlantic Ocean
- Stream gradient 13.9 ft/mi (2.63 m/km)

Elkhorn Creek is a stream in Nodaway County in the U.S. state of Missouri. It is a tributary of the Nodaway River and is 18.5 miles long.

== History ==
According to tradition, Elkhorn Creek was named on account of very long elk horns that were killed by Indians, which were left hanging on branches of a tree and were allowed to remain there many years. It was one of the first tributaries of the Nodaway River to be denoted with its present name.

== Geography ==
Elkhorn Creek is a left tributary of the Nodaway River and joins it 25.8 miles before its mouth in the Missouri River.

=== Course ===
It headwaters about 5 miles southwest of Maryville, then travels north and west until it reaches Monroe Township. It passes southwesterly through the southeast corner of Monroe Township and then turns southerly as it heads to Graham. The stream continues south past Graham on its east side and turns southwest before it joins the Nodaway River.

=== Hydrology ===
There are three permitted wastewater treatment facilities that flow into Elkhorn Creek: Graham, ANR Pipeline – Maitland Station, and Forcade Quarry. And, there are two named lakes in the watershed: Houston Lake and Shelton Lake. There is one tributary of this stream named East Branch Elkhorn Creek

=== Crossings ===
There are two highways that cross Elkhorn Creek, Route A and V, twice.

=== Miscellaneous ===
Dozens of wind turbines of the White Cloud Wind Farm are located in the northeastern portion of the Jenkins Creek watershed.

== See also ==
- Tributaries of the Nodaway River
- List of rivers of Missouri
