= Ivy Branch =

Stream in the American state of Missouri

Coordinates: 39.4644844°N 91.8154415°W

Ivy Branch is a stream in Monroe County in the U.S. state of Missouri.

Ivy Branch derives its name from a corruption of the surname of Anderson Ivie, the original owner of the site.

== See also ==
- List of rivers of Missouri
