= O'Bannon Creek =

Stream in Missouri, USA

Coordinates: 37.670885°N 90.416510°W

O'Bannon Creek is a stream in St. Francois County in the U.S. state of Missouri. It is a tributary of the St. Francis River.

O'Bannon Creek has the name of a pioneer citizen.

== See also ==
- List of rivers of Missouri
