= James Branch (Huzzah Creek tributary) =

Stream in the American state of Missouri

Coordinates: 37°44′21″N 91°12′15″W

James Branch is a stream in the U.S. state of Missouri. It is a tributary of Huzzah Creek.

James Branch was also called Jim's Branch, but the namesake of the name is unknown.

== See also ==
- List of rivers of Missouri
