= Black Jack Creek =

Stream in the US state of Missouri

Black Jack Creek is a stream in Crawford County in the U.S. state of Missouri. It is a tributary of Cherry Valley Creek.

The headwaters arise just east of Missouri Route 19 about four miles southeast of Steelville at an elevation of near 1000 feet (at 37°53′58″N 91°18′34″W)). The stream flows about two miles east to its confluence with Cherry Valley Creek at an elevation of 850 feet (at 37°54′07″N 91°15′48″W).

Black Jack Creek most likely was named for the blackjack oak along its course.

== See also ==
- List of rivers of Missouri
