= Sees Creek =

Stream in the American state of Missouri

Coordinates: 39.752543°N 91.673771°W

Sees Creek (also called Sees Branch) is a stream in Marion County in the U.S. state of Missouri.

Sees Creek has the name of William See, a pioneer citizen.

== See also ==
- List of rivers of Missouri
