= Sweet Oak Branch =

Stream in the American state of Missouri

Coordinates: 40.074486°N 91.952117°W

Sweet Oak Branch is a stream in Knox County in the U.S. state of Missouri.

Sweet Oak Branch was named for the sweet oak timber near its course.

== See also ==
- List of rivers of Missouri
