= Stuerman Branch =

Stream in the US state of Missouri

Coordinates: 38.703937°N 91.178206°W

Location
- Country: United States
- State: Missouri
- County: Warren County

Stuerman Branch is a stream in Warren County in the U.S. state of Missouri.

Stuerman Branch most likely has the name of Frank Stuermann, the original owner of the site.

== See also ==
- List of rivers of Missouri
