= Terrible Creek =

Stream in the U.S. state of Missouri

Terrible Creek is a stream in western Ripley County in southeast Missouri. It is a tributary of South Fork Buffalo Creek.

The stream headwaters are at 36°39′31″N 91°01′06″W and its confluence with the South Fork is at 36°42′07″N 90°59′44″W. The stream source area lies just north of US Route 160 west of Briar.

Terrible Creek was so named on account of the rugged terrain near its course.

== See also ==
- List of rivers of Missouri
