= Stahl Creek =

Stream in southwest Missouri, U.S.

Stahl Creek is a stream in Lawrence County of southwest Missouri.

The stream headwaters are at 37°11′39″N 93°47′44″W and its confluence with the Spring River is at 37°08′13″N 93°55′17″W. The stream headwaters arise just north of Heatonville and Missouri Route 96. the waters flow to the west passing under Missouri Route 39 just north of Albatross and south of Miller. The stream turns southwest passing under Route 96 and on bordering the southeast margin of the Robert E. Talbot Conservation Area to join the Spring River northwest of Mount Vernon.

Stahl Creek has the name of the local Stahl family.

== See also ==
- List of rivers of Missouri
