= Walnut Creek (East Fork Little Chariton River tributary) =

Stream in the US state of Missouri

Coordinates: 39°31′12″N 92°32′22″W

Walnut Creek is a stream in Randolph County in the U.S. state of Missouri. It is a tributary to the East Fork Little Chariton River.

Walnut Creek was so named due to the presence of walnut trees in the area.

== See also ==
- List of rivers of Missouri
