= Bessen Hollow =

Stream in the American state of Missouri

Coordinates: 38.0625465°N 91.1590291°W

Bessen Hollow or Bessen Branch is a stream in Crawford County in the U.S. state of Missouri. It is a tributary to Hinch Branch which it joins just west of Hinch.

Bessen Hollow has the name of a railroad worker.

== See also ==
- List of rivers of Missouri
