= Dugan Branch =

Stream in the American state of Missouri

Dugan Branch is a stream in Crawford County in the U.S. state of Missouri. It is a tributary of Shoal Creek.

The stream headwaters arise at 37°52′31″N 91°06′27″W and it flows westward to its confluence with Shoal Creek at 37°52′33″N 91°07′43″W approximately 2.5 miles (4.0 km) miles south of Huzzah.

Dugan Branch has the name of J. M. "Dugan" Gillam, the original owner of the site.

== See also ==
- List of rivers of Missouri
