= Mill Stone Branch =

Stream in the American state of Missouri

Mill Stone Branch is a stream in Oregon County in the Ozarks of southern Missouri. It is a tributary of Warm Fork Spring River. The stream headwaters are located at 36°37′50″N 91°35′46″W and the confluence with the Warm Fork is at 36°37′17″N 91°34′02″W.

Mill Stone Branch was so named on account of deposits of stone near its course which was used to fashion millstones.

== See also ==
- List of rivers of Missouri
