= Bussell Branch =

River in the United States of America

Bussell Branch is a stream in Oregon and Howell counties in the Ozarks of southern Missouri.

The stream headwaters are located in southeastern Howell County at 36°37′15″N 91°41′52″W and the stream enters a large sinkhole in Grand Gulf State Park in southwest Oregon County at 36°32′50″N 91°39′00″W.

Bussell Branch has the name of Morton Bussell, a pioneer citizen.

== See also ==
- List of rivers of Missouri
