= Norris Creek =

Stream in the American state of Missouri

Norris Creek is a stream in Henry and Johnson Counties in the U.S. state of Missouri. It is a tributary of Big Creek.

The stream headwaters arise in Johnson County between the communities of Chilhowee and Denton at 38°36′37″N 93°52′42″W and the stream flows south crossing under Missouri Route 2 and enters Henry County to its confluence with Big Creek south of Blairstown at 38°30′41″N 93°56′24″W.

Norris Creek has the name of William Norris, the proprietor of a mill along its course.

== See also ==
- List of rivers of Missouri
