= Kelly Branch =

River in the United States of America

Kelly Branch is a stream in Crawford County in the U.S. state of Missouri. It is a tributary of the Meramec River.

The stream headwaters arise just west of the Huzzah Conservation Area and about one-half mile north of the community of Scotia at 38°02′19″N 91°12′27″W. It flows to the north-northwest to its confluence with the Meramec adjacent to the southeast side of the Onondaga Cave State Park at 38°03′34″N 91°13′15″W.

Kelly Branch has the name of an early settler.

== See also ==
- List of rivers of Missouri
