= Kinney Branch =

Stream in the American state of Missouri

Coordinates: 37.3525497°N 90.6753972°W

Kinney Branch is a stream in Iron County in the U.S. state of Missouri.

Kinney Branch has the name of the local Kinney family.

== See also ==
- List of rivers of Missouri
