= Joslin Branch =

Stream in the American state of Missouri

Coordinates: 38°30′12″N 94°13′43″W

Joslin Branch is a stream in Cass County in the U.S. state of Missouri. It is a tributary of Sugar Creek.

Joslin Branch was named after the local Joslin family.

== See also ==
- List of rivers of Missouri
