= North Dry Sac River =

Stream in the US state of Missouri

North Dry Sac River is a stream in northern Greene and southern Polk counties in the Ozarks of southwest Missouri.

The stream headwaters arise in northern Greene County southwest of Fair Grove and north of Hickory Barren at 37°22′08″N 93°12′22″W and the stream flows northwest passing under routes H and CC and Missouri Route 13 to its confluence with the Little Sac River southwest of Brighton at 37°26′22″N 93°23′47″W.

North Dry Sac River, a tributary of the Little Sac River, was named for its tendency to run dry.

== See also ==
- List of rivers of Missouri
