= Potter Branch =

Stream in Missouri, United States

Coordinates: 37.1350497°N 90.8365112°W

Potter Branch is a stream in Reynolds County in the U.S. state of Missouri. It is a tributary of Webb Creek.

Potter Branch has the name of the local Potter family.

== See also ==
- List of rivers of Missouri
