= Casselman Branch =

Stream in the US state of Missouri

Coordinates: 38.9231033°N 91.0323649°W

Casselman Branch is a stream in Lincoln County in the U.S. state of Missouri. It is a tributary of Coon Creek.

Casselman Branch most likely has the name of the local Casselman family.

== See also ==
- List of rivers of Missouri
