= Clevinger Branch =

Stream in the American state of Missouri

Coordinates: 36°33′29″N 93°17′35″W

Clevinger Branch is a stream in southwestern Taney County in the U.S. state of Missouri. The stream is a tributary of the Long Creek branch of Table Rock Lake. The Stream headwaters arise just northeast of the route 65/86 junction northwest of Ridgedale at and the former confluence with Long Creek is at . The stream enters Table Rock Lake along a shoreline road in the Long Creek Recreation Area at .

Clevinger Branch has the name of Judge Clevinger, a pioneer citizen.

== See also ==
- List of rivers of Missouri
