= Blairs Creek =

Stream in the American state of Missouri

Coordinates: 38°02′29″N 91°18′17″W

Blairs Creek is a stream in Crawford County in the U.S. state of Missouri. It is a tributary of Meramec River.

Blairs Creek has the name of a local family. The Blair Family was a late 19th and 1st half of the 20th century family of farmers and millers. The patriarch, William Samuel Blair, was a prominent Crawford citizen and his son, Charles Melvin Blair, purchased the farm on which Blairs Creek is located and empties into the Meramec river. He and his wife, Jennie, Mallow Blair, raised their family there in a house he built with his own hand. The Farm is often still referred to as "The Old Blair Homeplace".

== See also ==
- List of rivers of Missouri
