= Gal Branch =

Stream in the US state of Missouri

Gal Branch is a stream in Crawford and Gasconade counties in the U.S. state of Missouri. It is a tributary of Brush Creek.

The stream headwaters arise at 38°11′44″N 91°23′37″W and its confluence with Brush Creek is approximately one mile north of Oak Hill at 38°13′23″N 91°25′20″W.

Gal Branch was so named for the fact a large share of the early residents were girls.

== See also ==
- List of rivers of Missouri
