= Martigney Creek =

Stream in St. Louis County, Missouri, U.S.

Coordinates: 38.4842198°N 90.2798373°W

Martigney Creek is a stream in St. Louis County in the U.S. state of Missouri. It is a tributary of the Mississippi River.

A variant spelling was "Martigne Creek". The creek most likely has the name of Jean B. Martigny, a pioneer landowner.

== See also ==
- List of rivers of Missouri
