= Peddler Creek =

Stream in Missouri, U.S.

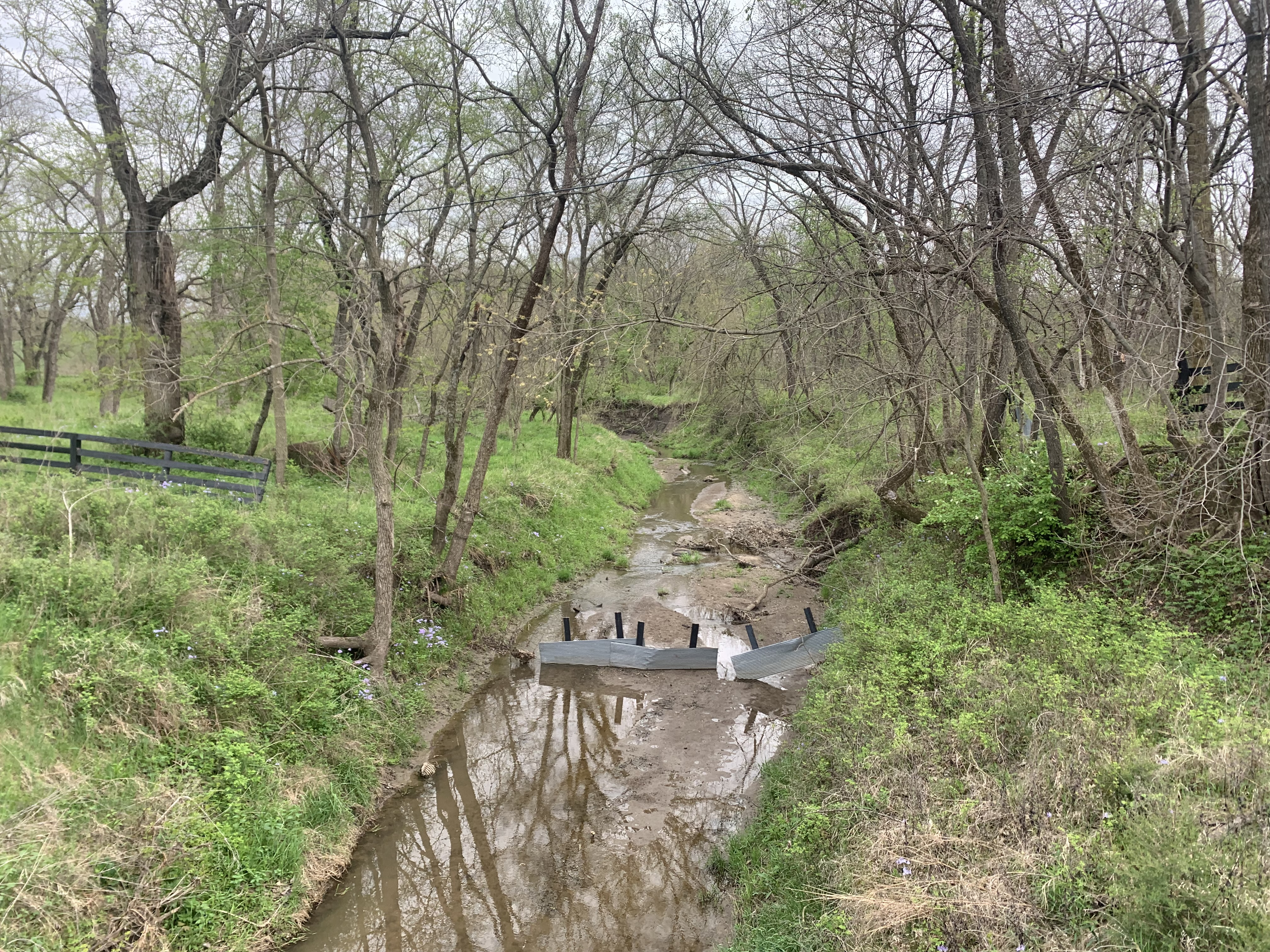
Peddler Creek at 270 Street in Bogle Township

Peddler Creek is a stream in Gentry and Worth counties in the U.S. state of Missouri. It is a tributary of the Middle Fork of the Grand River.

Its headwaters arise at 40°25′32″N 94°23′17″W and it flows south to south-southwest to its confluence with the Middle Fork of the Grand at 40°18′39″N 94°24′38″W at an elevation of 866 feet. The headwater region lies in Worth County midway between Worth and Denver. The stream flows south roughly parallel to and one mile east of U.S. Route 169. The confluence is approximately 1.5 miles southeast of Gentry in Gentry County.

According to tradition, Peddler Creek was named for an incident when a peddler was robbed by a party masquerading as Indians.

== See also ==
- List of rivers of Missouri
