= Scattering Branch =

Stream in the American state of Missouri

Coordinates: 39.349206°N 92.081840°W

Scattering Branch is a stream in Audrain and Monroe Counties in the U.S. state of Missouri. It is a tributary of Long Branch.

The stream was named for the forks along its watercourse.

== See also ==
- List of rivers of Missouri
