= Harless Creek =

Stream in the U.S. state of Missouri

Coordinates: 38°34′15″N 94°33′24″W

Harless Creek is a stream in the U.S. states of Kansas and Missouri. It is a tributary of the South Fork of the South Grand River.

Harless Creek was named after the local Harless family.

== See also ==
- List of rivers of Kansas
- List of rivers of Missouri
