= Seitz Branch =

Stream in Wayne County, Missouri, USA

Coordinates: 37°07′11″N 90°30′19″W

Seitz Branch is a stream in Wayne County in the U.S. state of Missouri. It is a tributary of Big Lake Creek.

Seitz Branch was named after E. B. Seitz, an early settler.

== See also ==
- List of rivers of Missouri
