= Irvine Branch =

Stream in the American state of Missouri

Coordinates: 39°16′42″N 91°15′23″W

Irvine Branch is a stream in Pike County in the U.S. state of Missouri. It is a tributary of the North Fork Cuivre River.

Irvine Branch has the name of Robert Irvine, a pioneer settler.

== See also ==
- List of rivers of Missouri
