= Byar Branch =

Stream in the US state of Missouri

Coordinates: 39.852815°N 92.2637941°W

Byar Branch is a water stream in the U.S. state of Missouri. It is a tributary of Bear Creek.

Byar Branch has the name of the local Byar family.

== See also ==
- List of rivers of Missouri
