= Ely Branch =

Stream in Ralls County, Missouri, U.S.

Coordinates: 39.502819°N 91.707104°W

Ely Branch is a stream in Ralls County in the U.S. state of Missouri. It is a tributary of the Salt River.

Ely Branch has the name of Benjamin S. Ely, a pioneer settler.

== See also ==
- List of rivers of Missouri
