= Peachtree Fork =

Stream in the American state of Missouri

Coordinates: 37°11′27″N 90°37′29″W

Peachtree Fork is a stream in Wayne County in the U.S. state of Missouri. It is a tributary of Clark Creek.

Peachtree Fork took its name from a nearby spring where the Indians harvested peaches.

== See also ==
- List of rivers of Missouri
