= Quick Creek =

Stream in the American state of Missouri

Quick Creek is a stream in southwest Montgomery County in the U.S. state of Missouri. It is a tributary of the Missouri River.

The stream headwaters arise at 38°44′23″N 91°35′53″W at an elevation of approximately 900 feet. The stream flows south and east to enter the Missouri River floodplain about one mile west of Rhineland. It passes under Missouri Route 94 and continues to the east to its confluence with the Missouri River north of the west side of Hermann at 38°42′35″N 91°27′08″W and an elevation of 492 feet.

Quick Creek was named after Alexander Quick, a pioneer settler.

== See also ==
- List of rivers of Missouri
