= Saling Branch =

Stream in the U.S. state of Missouri

Coordinates: 39.945593°N 92.270184°W

Saling Branch (also called Sailing Branch) is a stream in the U.S. state of Missouri.

Saling Branch was named after the local Saling family.

== See also ==
- List of rivers of Missouri
