= Gribler Creek =

Stream in the U.S. state of Missouri

Gribler Creek is a stream in Bollinger and Wayne counties in the U.S. state of Missouri. It is a tributary of McGee Creek.

The stream headwaters arise in southern Bollinger County at 37°05′48″N 90°10′58″W and it flows southeast passing into northern Wayne County where it flows under Missouri Route P to its confluence with McGee Creek about 1.5 miles east of the community of McGee. The confluence is at 37°04′28″N 90°09′45″W.

Variant names were "Gribbler Creek" and "Grubbler Creek". The creek has the name of Alvin and John Gribbler, original owners of the site.

== See also ==
- List of rivers of Missouri
