= Dousinbury Creek =

Stream in the U.S. state of Missouri

Dousinbury Creek is a stream in Dallas and Laclede counties in the Ozarks of southwest Missouri.

The stream headwaters are at 37°32′23″N 92°49′12″W and the confluence with the Niangua River is at 37°35′44″N 92°58′48″W. The stream source area in western Laclede County lies just northeast of Interstate 44 between Conway and Phillipsburg. The stream flows north and then west passing into Dallas County and crossing under Missouri Route B between Earnestville and Long Lane. The stream continues west passing under Missouri Route JJ before entering the Niangua.

Alternate spellings of the name include Dousenburg, Duesenberry and Dusenberry.

Dousinbury Creek was named after Carlos Duesenberry, a pioneer citizen.

== See also ==
- List of rivers of Missouri
