= Frene Creek =

Stream in Gasconade County, Missouri, U.S.

Frene Creek is a stream located in northeast Gasconade County in the U.S. state of Missouri. It is a tributary of the Missouri River.

The headwaters of the stream arise approximately four miles south of Hermann just west of Missouri Route 19 at 38°38′04″N 91°27′20″W. It flows northwest, then turns northeast and flows roughly parallel to Missouri Route 100. The stream enters the city of Hermann and passes under Route 19 and joins the Missouri River after flowing beneath Route 100 in eastern Hermann at 38°42′27″N 91°25′46″W.

Frene Creek was named for the ash tree, "frêne" being a word derived from the French meaning "ash". The stream has also been called Ash Creek.

== See also ==
- List of rivers of Missouri
