= Mormon Fork =

Stream in the U.S. state of Missouri

Mormon Fork or Mormon Fork Branch is a stream in northwestern Bates County in the west central part of the U.S. state of Missouri.

The stream headwaters arise just south of the Bates-Cass county line about two miles east-southeast of Drexel just east of Missouri Route 18. The stream flows southeast past the community of Burdett then turns to the northeast passing about two miles northwest of Adrian. The stream flows under U.S. Route 71 and enters the South Grand River at the Bates-Cass county line.

The source is at 38°28′32″N 94°34′48″W and the confluence with the South Grand is at 38°27′59″N 94°18′59″W with an elevation of 781 feet (238 m).

The area around Mormon Creek was originally settled chiefly by Mormons, hence the name.

== See also ==
- List of rivers of Missouri
