= Prairie Creek (Brush Creek tributary) =

Stream in the US state of Missouri

Prairie Creek (also called Prairie Valley Creek) is a stream in Crawford County in the U.S. state of Missouri. It is a tributary of Brush Creek.

The stream headwaters arise at 38°04′49″N 91°22′31″W approximately one mile northeast of Cuba and just south of US Route 44. The stream flows under Route 44 and continues to the north-northeast roughly paralleling Missouri Route 19 for about five miles. It then crosses under Route 19 to its confluence with Brush Creek at 38°08′49″N 91°26′02″W.

Prairie Creek was descriptively named.

== See also ==
- List of rivers of Missouri
