= Lost Creek (South Grand River tributary) =

Stream in the US state of Missouri

Lost Creek is a stream in Cass County in the U.S. state of Missouri. It is a tributary of the South Grand River.

The headwaters are at 38°30′21″N 94°07′38″W and the confluence with the South Grand River is at 38°27′14″N 94°07′34″W.

Lost Creek was named for the fact it is a losing stream on part of its course.

== See also ==
- List of rivers of Missouri
