= Peters Branch =

Stream in the American state of Missouri

Coordinates: 37°10′56″N 90°27′57″W

Peters Branch is a stream in Wayne County in the U.S. state of Missouri. It is a tributary of Hubble Creek. Peters Branch has the name of William Peters, original owner of the site.

== See also ==
- List of rivers of Missouri
