= Taum Sauk Creek =

Stream in the U.S. state of Missouri

Taum Sauk Creek is a stream in Iron and Reynolds Counties in the U.S. state of Missouri.

The headwaters arise in Iron County on the west side of Taum Sauk Mountain within Taum Sauk Mountain State Park (at 37°34′14″N 90°44′01″W) at an elevation of 1680 feet. The stream flows southwest into Reynolds County to enter the Lower Reservoir on the East Fork Black River (at 37°30′06″N 90°49′21″W).

A variant name was "Tom Sauk Creek". The creek takes its name from Taum Sauk Mountain.

== See also ==
- List of rivers of Missouri
