= Twomile Branch =

Stream in the American state of Missouri

Coordinates: 39.047263°N 91.426825°W

Twomile Branch is a stream in Montgomery County in the U.S. state of Missouri. It is a tributary of Elkhorn Creek.

The name Twomile Branch is descriptive, for the stream is approximately two miles (3.2 km) long.

== See also ==
- List of rivers of Missouri
