= Elm Branch (Salt River tributary) =

Stream in the American state of Missouri

Coordinates: 39.369207°N 91.802942°W

Elm Creek is a stream in the U.S. state of Missouri. It is a tributary of the Salt River.

Elm Creek was named for the elm trees on its course.

== See also ==
- List of rivers of Missouri
