= Dillion Creek =

Stream in the American state of Missouri

Coordinates: 38.3147452°N 93.7391008°W

Dillion Creek is a stream in Henry County in the U.S. state of Missouri.

Dillion Creek bears the name of a pioneer settler.

== See also ==
- List of rivers of Missouri
