= Horseshoe Branch =

Stream in Missouri, U.S.

Coordinates: 39.628651°N 91.901°W

Horseshoe Branch (also called Horse Shoe Creek) is a stream in the U.S. state of Missouri. It is a tributary of the North Fork Salt River.

Horseshoe Branch was so named on account of its course having the shape of a horseshoe.

== See also ==
- List of rivers of Missouri
