= Galbreath Creek =

Stream in the U.S. state of Missouri

Coordinates: 39.3778158°N 92.2993450°W

Galbreath Creek is a stream in the U.S. state of Missouri.

Galbreath Creek has the name of an early citizen.

== See also ==
- List of rivers of Missouri
