= Mingo Creek (St. Francis River tributary) =

Stream in the American state of Missouri

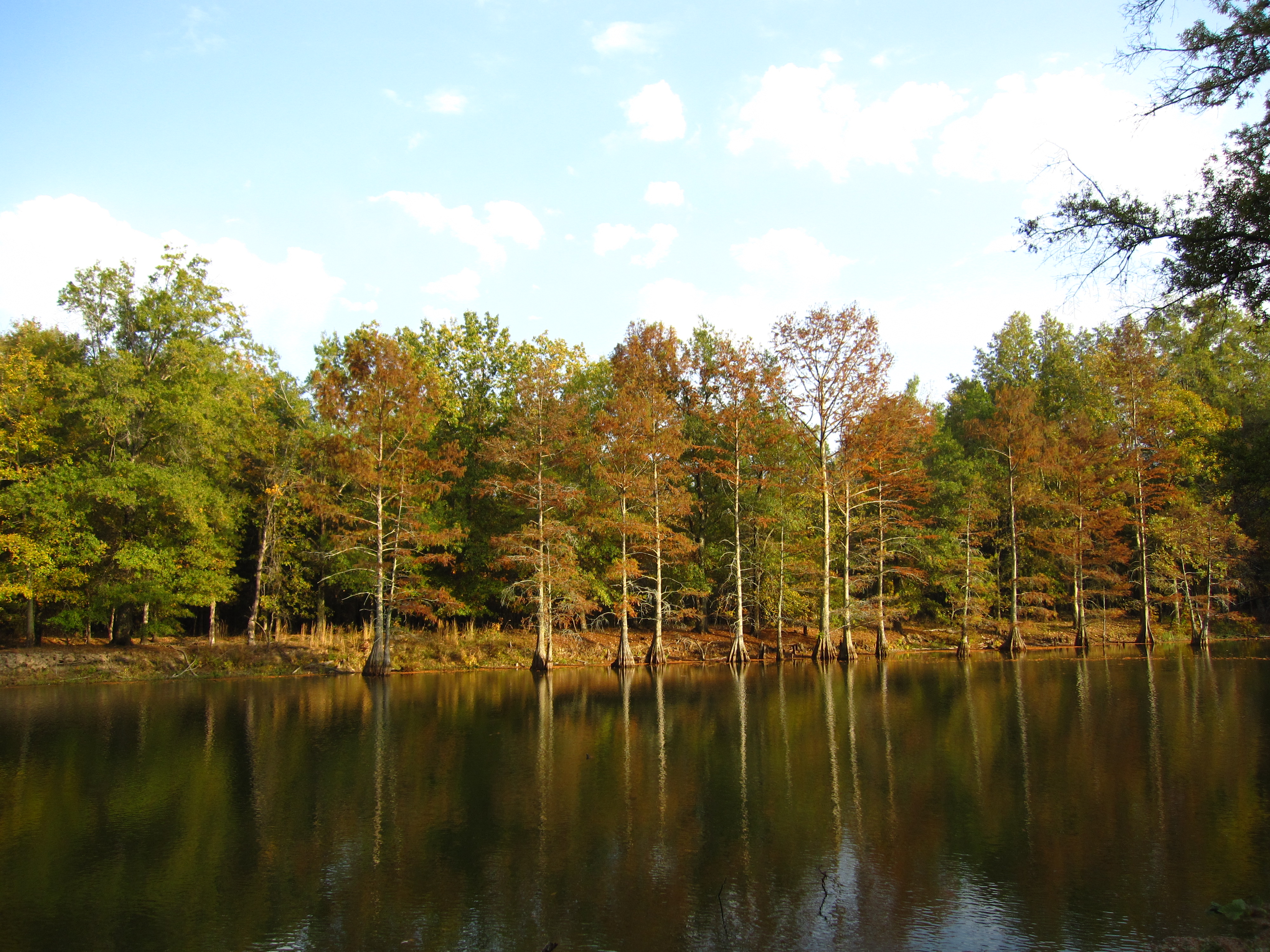
Mingo Creek in Mingo National Wildlife Refuge

Mingo Creek is a stream in Stoddard and Wayne counties in the U.S. state of Missouri. It is a tributary of St. Francis River.

The stream headwaters are within the Mingo Swamp in Wayne County (at 36°59′08″N 90°12′03″W). It flows south into Stoddard County and past the communities of Mingo and Cobb then turns west to re-enter Wayne County just prior to its confluence with the St. Francis about two miles east-southeast of the Wappapello Lake dam (at 36°55′31″N 90°14′42″W) at an elevation of 341 feet (104 m).

Mingo Creek took its name from Mingo Swamp.

== See also ==
- List of rivers of Missouri
