= Turkey Creek (Kansas River tributary) =

Stream in Kansas, U.S.

Location
- Country: United States
- State: Kansas
- County: Johnson and Wyandotte

Physical characteristics
- Source
  - location: Lenexa, Kansas
  - coordinates: 38°58′04″N 94°43′04″W
  - elevation: 1,047 feet (319 m)
- Mouth: Kansas River
  - location: Kansas City, Kansas
  - coordinates: 39°04′38″N 94°37′08″W
  - elevation: 722 feet (220 m)
- Length: 10.7 mi (17.2 km)
- Basin size: 19,898 acres (8,052 ha)
- Discharge
  - location: mouth
  - average: 22.49 cu ft/s (0.637 m^{3}/s) (estimate)

Basin features
- Progression: Kansas River → Missouri River → Mississippi River → Atlantic Ocean
- GNIS: 479260

Turkey Creek is a stream spanning Johnson and Wyandotte counties in Kansas, within the Kansas City metropolitan area of the United States. It is a tributary of the Kansas River, with its mouth near downtown Kansas City, Kansas.

In 1882, a local newspaper summarized: "Turkey Creek, a live, impetuous stream, meanders at will through the place seemingly priding itself on its independence in designating its own path, regardless of the points on the compass, or the predominating requirements of this expeditious age in economizing time and space by taking air line courses."

== History ==
In the early 1800s, Turkey Creek was part of French Bottoms, settled by rows of narrow strips of farms owned by French-speaking pioneering settlers of French-Canadian and tribal mixed culture. In 1823, pioneering American surveyor Joseph C. Brown documented the creek's mouth at the Missouri River, about 1 mile (1.6 km) east of Kaw Point, with a watershed west of the Missouri state line and about 20 miles (32 km) into the Indian Territory. Later, at the all-time record Great Flood of 1844, Turkey Creek relocated its mouth from the Missouri River westward to the Kansas River and erased all human settlement of the French Bottoms. Its original couse into the Kansas River was further north than its present course and briefly traveled into Kansas City, Missouri.

The stream has always threatened the area with countless floods through history, sometimes being flooded by the Kansas River or flooding into Indian Creek. Several floods in the early 1900s prompted a 1918-1920 engineering project creating a flood channel to the Kansas River by boring a 28 by 32 foot wide and 1,450 feet (440 m) long tunnel through the bluff called Greystone Heights. Another was the Great Flood of 1951. On June 10, 1993, during the Great Flood of 1993, Turkey Creek's tunnel beneath Interstate 35 was capable of diverting only 8,000 cubic feet (230 m^{3}) per second but the stream peaked at about 20,000 cubic feet (570 m^{3}) per second, flooding Southwest Boulevard. An area flood in 1998 pushed the creek to that same water flow, causing more than $50 million in damage.

The creek directly floods several cities in the Upper Turkey Creek Basin, for which the U.S. Army Corps of Engineers has developed complicated flood control deployments and ongoing proposals. Affected localities include the Merriam, Kansas drainage district, receiving over $23 million in federal Infrastructure Investment and Jobs Act funding in 2022, where one municipal objective is to eliminate the need for downtown businesses to buy flood insurance.

The $529 million, multi-decade, Kansas City Levee Project is complemented by the Turkey Creek Flood Damage Reduction Project. As of 2023, the latter had spent about $160 million of combined funding from Kansas City, Missouri (KCMO), the local Unified Government, and the federal government. It can handle at least 18,000 to 20,000 cubic feet (570 m^{3}) of water per second, equivalent to one normal day of the Missouri River. This includes new flood drainage, where the KC Water department of KCMO bored the horizontal tunnels at a rate of 4 feet (1.2 m) per day to install six new storm pipes of 96 inches (2.4 m) diameter each, delicately beneath the busy railroad, in preparation for construction by the Corps. The key was reportedly to open the channel from 45 feet wide to 100 feet (30 m) wide for 2 miles (3.2 km).

The final 1,261 feet (384 m) of the stream runs through a tunnel constructed by the Corps beneath a natural limestone shelf.

== See also ==
- List of rivers of Kansas
