= Wolf Branch (Little Bridge Creek tributary) =

Stream in the American state of Missouri

Coordinates: 40.178929°N 92.005731°W

Wolf Branch is a stream in Knox County in the U.S. state of Missouri. It is a tributary of Little Bridge Creek.

Wolf Branch was named for the wolves seen in the area.

== See also ==
- List of rivers of Missouri
