= Turkey Creek (Castor River tributary) =

Stream in the American state of Missouri

Turkey Creek is a stream in Wayne County in the U.S. state of Missouri. It is a tributary of the Castor River.

The stream headwaters arise in northeastern Wayne County and it flows generally southeast passing under Missouri Route 34 and on to its confluence with the Castor River just west of the Wayne-Bollinger county line 1.5 miles west-southwest of Buchanan at 37°12′03″N 90°13′15″W.

Turkey Creek was so named on account of wild turkeys near its course.

== See also ==
- List of rivers of Missouri
