= Indian Creek (Blue River tributary) =

Stream in Kansas and Missouri, U.S.

Coordinates: 38°57′09″N 94°33′46″W

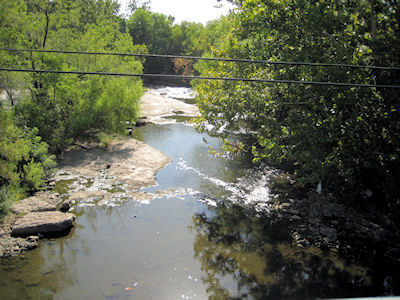
Indian Creek at Overland Park, Kansas

Indian Creek is a stream in Johnson County, Kansas and Jackson County, Missouri. It is a tributary of the Blue River.

Indian Creek was named for the Indians who once passed through the area. As of 2019, Indian Creek had been chronically flooded by Turkey Creek, which was studied by the U.S. Army Corps of Engineers.

== See also ==
- List of rivers of Kansas
- List of rivers of Missouri
