= Rollins Creek (Des Moines River tributary) =

Stream in the US state of Missouri

Coordinates: 40.601703°N 91.721553°W

Rollins Creek (also known as Rollins Branch) is a stream in the U.S. state of Missouri. It is a tributary of the Des Moines River.

Rollins Creek has the name of the local Rollins family.

== See also ==
- List of rivers of Missouri
