= Stephens Branch =

Stream in the American state of Missouri

Coordinates: 38°53′41″N 92°47′50″W

Stephens Branch is a stream in Cooper County in the U.S. state of Missouri. It is a tributary of Petite Saline Creek.

Stephens Branch bears the surname of an early settler.

== See also ==
- List of rivers of Missouri
