= Cottey Creek =

Stream in the American state of Missouri

Cottey Creek (also called Cottey Branch) is a stream in Knox County in the U.S. state of Missouri. It is a tributary of Troublesome Creek.

The stream headwaters arise at 40°05′36″N 92°03′29″W and it flows generally north for approximately two miles to its confluence at 40°07′32″N 92°03′24″W. The confluence is 2.5 miles southwest of Knox City and 6.5 miles southeast of Edina.

Cottey Creek has the name of the local Cottey family.

== See also ==
- List of rivers of Missouri
