= Little Sac River =

Stream in the US state of Missouri

The Little Sac River is a stream in Greene, Polk and Dade counties the Ozarks of southwest Missouri, United States.

The stream source coordinates are: 37°17′09″N 93°06′34″W and the confluence coordinates are: 37°39′06″N 93°45′39″W.

The Little Sac headwaters start with an intermittent stream just north of Strafford in eastern Greene County. The stream passes under Missouri Route 125 just downstream from its source. The stream flows westward and just after passing under U. S. Route 65 the stream enters Fellows Lake. After leaving Fellows the stream enters McDaniel Lake. Springfield lies two to three miles to the south of the lakes. After leaving McDaniel the stream passes under Missouri Route 13. The stream then turns to the northwest and enters Polk County. South of Morrisville the North Dry Sac River enters the stream and the stream turns to the northwest passing under Missouri Route 215 and enters the east arm of Stockton Lake just southeast of Aldrich and passes under Missouri Route 123. The former confluence with the Sac River (coordinates above) in Dade County lies under Stockton Lake about 12 miles to the northwest. At Aldrich, the river has an average annual discharge of 332 cubic feet per second.
