= Dry Fork (Meramec River tributary) =

Stream in the U.S. state of Missouri

Dry Fork is a stream in Crawford, Dent and Phelps counties in the Ozarks of Missouri. It is a tributary of the Meramec River.

The stream headwaters are at 37°31′32″N 91°38′35″W and the confluence with the Meramec is at 37°58′10″N 91°31′32″W.

Dry Fork was named for the fact it frequently runs dry.

== See also ==
- List of rivers of Missouri
