= Deer Creek (Osage River tributary) =

Stream in the American state of Missouri

Coordinates: 38°13′23″N 93°09′13″W

Deer Creek is a stream in Benton and Camden counties in the U.S. state of Missouri. It is a tributary of the Osage River.

Deer Creek was named for the abundance of deer along its course.

== See also ==
- List of rivers of Missouri
