= McMullen Branch =

Stream in Jefferson County, Missouri, U.S.

Coordinates: 38.1003309°N 90.5329034°W

McMullen Branch is a stream in Jefferson County in the U.S. state of Missouri.

McMullen Branch has the name of the local McMullen family.

== See also ==
- List of rivers of Missouri
