= Blue River (Missouri River tributary) =

Stream in Kansas and Missouri, USA

Blue River Big Blue River
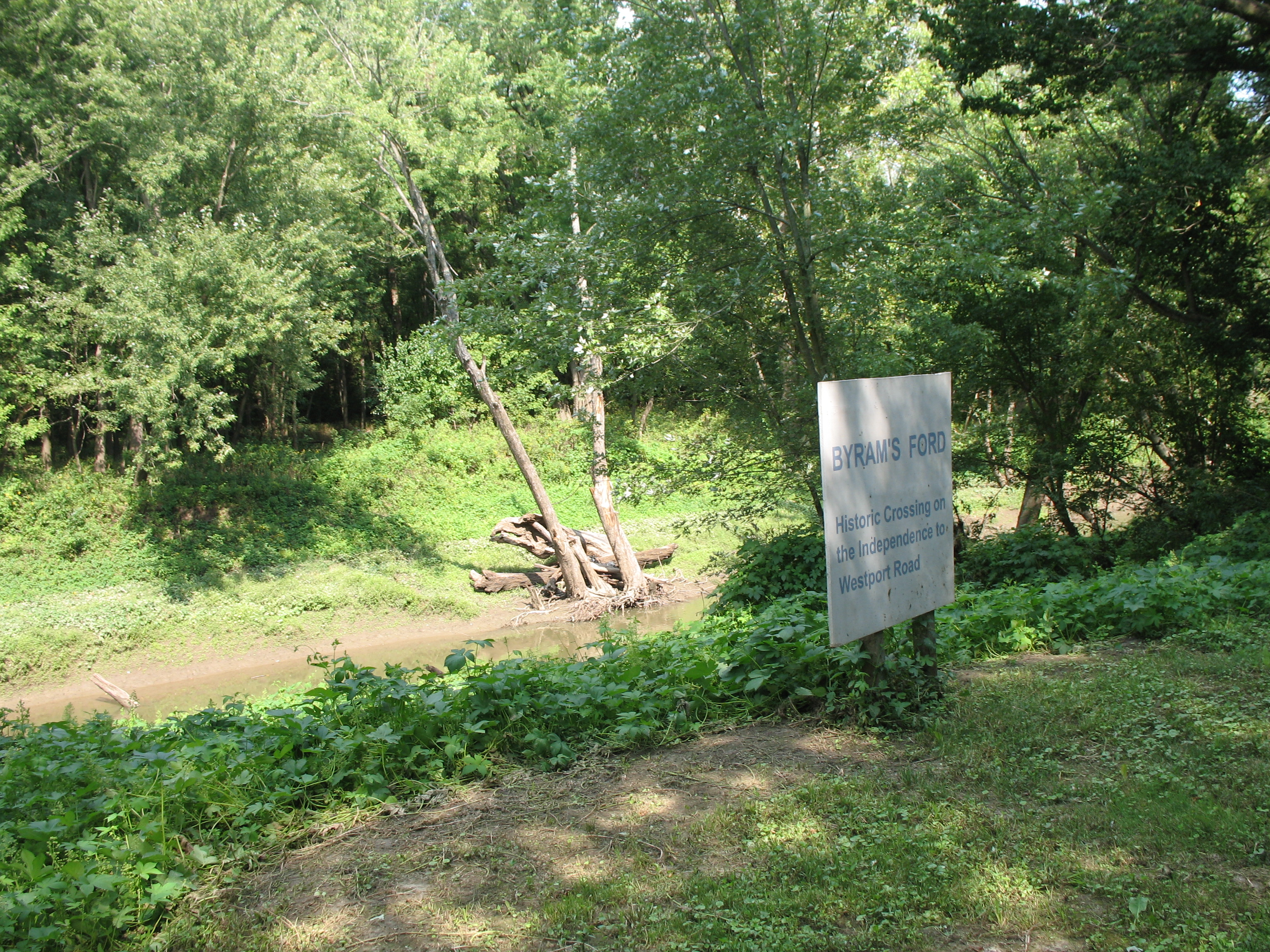
- Blue River at Byram's Ford where the Battle of Byram's Ford (a skirmish of the Battle of Westport) was fought by Swope Park

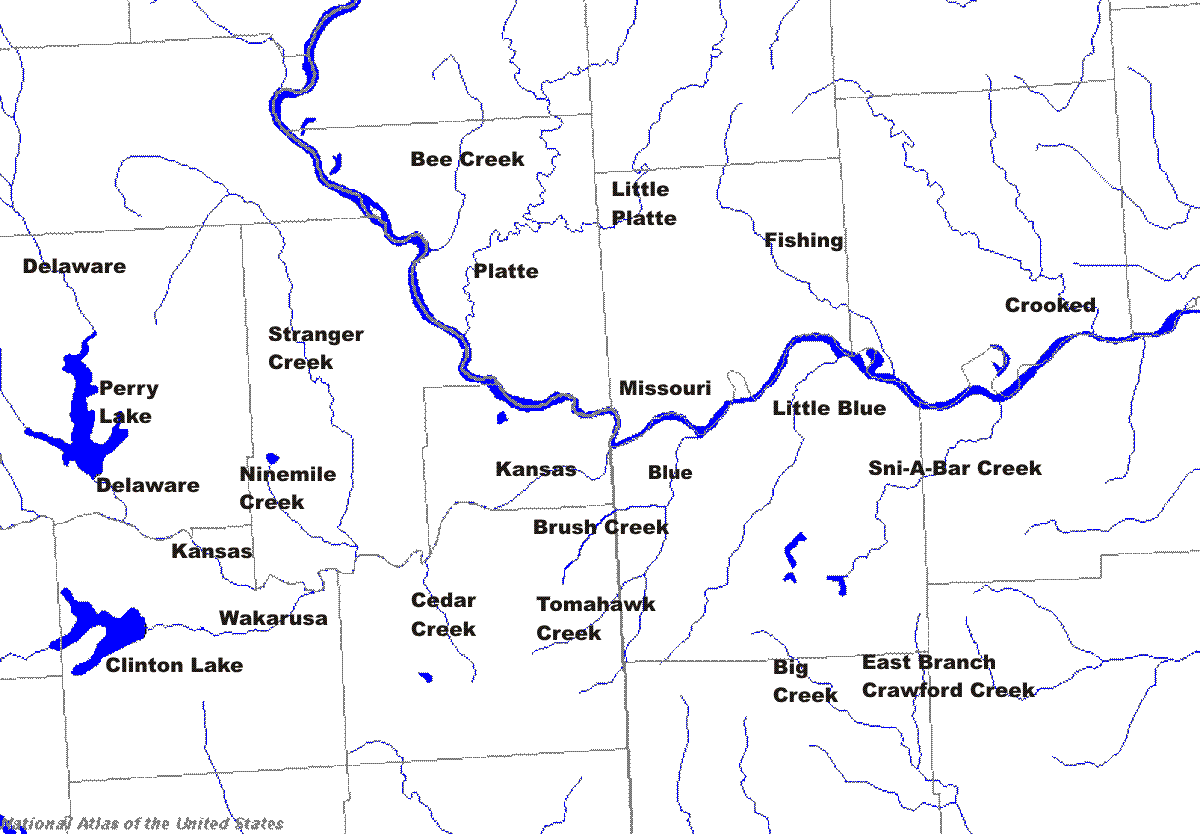
- Blue River in the Kansas City metropolitan area

Location
- Country: United States
- State: Kansas, Missouri
- City: Kansas City

Physical characteristics
- Source: confluence of Coffee Creek and Wolf Creek
  - location: East Johnson County, Kansas, United States
  - coordinates: 38°48′31″N 094°40′50″W
  - elevation: 904 ft (276 m)
- Mouth: Missouri River
  - location: Kansas City, Missouri, United States
  - coordinates: 39°07′44″N 094°28′07″W
  - elevation: 725 ft (221 m)
- Length: 39 mi (63 km), Northeast
- Discharge
  - location: mouth
  - average: 253.76 cu ft/s (7.186 m^{3}/s) (estimate)

Basin features
- River system: Missouri River
- Tributaries
  - left: Brush Creek

The Blue River (also known as the Big Blue River) is a 39.8-mile-long (64.1 km) stream that flows through Johnson County, Kansas, and Jackson County, Missouri, in the Kansas City Metropolitan Area. The river rises in Johnson County, Kansas at the confluence of Coffee Creek and Wolf Creek near the border of the states of Kansas and Missouri. Crossing the city of Kansas City, Missouri, it empties into the Missouri River near the border between Kansas City and Independence, Missouri.

Its major tributaries are Brush Creek, Tomahawk Creek, and Indian Creek.

== Recreation ==
Along the Blue River can be found many miles of hiking, biking, and walking trails. Portions of these trails trace the path of a former steam railroad track of the Missouri Pacific Railroad line that ran from Dodson, Missouri south to Martin City, Missouri. This rail bed followed the Blue River and had many curves. The route was straightened in 1954 with the use of three high trestle bridges over the Blue River and one substantial cut. This improved line is now the Union Pacific - Kansas City Southern Mainline and generally parallels the Blue River into the bottoms railyard near Front Street in Kansas City, Missouri.

== History ==
On the high bluffs overlooking the confluence of the Blue River and the Missouri River can be found a large Native American mound structure, designated as Indian Mound Park in the Indian Mound neighborhood of Kansas City, Missouri.

The three western trails, the Santa Fe, Oregon, and California trails, crossed the river just north of Red Bridge Road and Minor Park. Mountain man Jim Bridger had a trading post at this location.

During the Civil War, the Blue River was the site of the Battle of Byram's Ford.

== See also ==
- Blue River (disambiguation)
- List of Kansas rivers
- List of Missouri rivers
