= Wilsons Creek (Missouri) =

Stream in Missouri, U.S.

Wilsons Creek is a 13.9-mile-long (22.4 km) waterway near Springfield, Missouri, United States. It is formed by the confluence of Jordan Creek and Fassnight Creek in southwest Springfield, just south of Bennett Street between Scenic Avenue and Kansas Expressway. It was the site of the Civil War Battle of Wilson's Creek and flows south through Wilson's Creek National Battlefield. It is a tributary of the James River which it joins in western Christian County. At Battlefield, the creek has an annual average discharge of 95 cubic feet per second.

View of Wilsons Creek at Wilson's Creek National Battlefield

The creek has the name of James Wilson, a pioneer citizen.

== History ==
During the Civil War, The Battle of Wilson's Creek was fought in the area between an estimated 5,400 Union Troops and an estimated 11,000 Confederate troops. There were an 1,235 estimated Union casualties (22.87% of total Union forces), and an estimated 1,095 Confederate casualties (9.95% of total Confederate forces). The Confederate Army won the battle, giving them control of southwestern Missouri. However, the Union troops were able to escape, as the Confederates were unable to follow them as they retreated. They were exhausted, and had little supplies.

== Location ==
Mouth
Confluence with the James River, Christian County, Missouri: 37°04′06″N 93°24′04″W
Source
Confluence of Fassnight Creek and Jordan Creek, Springfield, Greene County, Missouri: 37°11′15″N 93°19′36″W
