= Hubble Creek (St. Francis River tributary) =

Stream in the U.S. state of Missouri

Hubble Creek is a stream in Wayne County in the U.S. state of Missouri. It is a tributary of the St. Francis River.

The stream headwaters arise at 37°13′51″N 90°25′58″W and the stream flows south-southwest parallel to US Route 67 passing the communities of Bounds and Silva to its confluence with the St. Francis within the waters of Lake Wappapello at 37°09′23″N 90°28′36″W.

Hubble Creek has the name of a pioneer citizen.

== See also ==
- List of rivers of Missouri
- Hubble Creek, Cape Girardeau County
