= Hickory Barren, Missouri =

Unincorporated community in Missouri, U.S.

Coordinates: 37°20′52″N 93°13′17″W

Hickory Barren is an unincorporated community in northern Greene County, in the U.S. state of Missouri. The community is on Missouri Route H, two miles north of Fellows Lake. Fair Grove is approximately four miles to the northeast.

== History ==
A post office called Hickory Barren was established in 1846, and remained in operation until 1906. The community was named for a grove of hickory trees near the open, or "barren", town site.
