= Silver Creek (East Fork Little Chariton River tributary) =

Stream in the US state of Missouri

Silver Creek is a stream in southwestern Randolph County and the southeast corner of Chariton County in north central Missouri. It is a tributary of the East Fork Little Chariton River with the confluence in Chariton County. The headwaters of Silver Creek are just northwest of Higbee.

The source is at 39°19′33″N 92°30′29″W and the confluence is at 39°22′53″N 92°43′24″W.

Silver Creek was so named because of its clean water.

== See also ==
- List of rivers of Missouri
