= Spring Creek (Bourbeuse River tributary) =

Stream in the US state of Missouri

Spring Creek is a stream in southeastern Franklin County in the U.S. state of Missouri. It is a tributary of Bourbeuse River.

The stream headwaters arise along the north side of Missouri Route 185 approximately one mile west of downtown Sullivan at 38°12′53″N 91°11′47″W. The stream flows north passing west of the Long Ridge Conservation Area three miles east of Spring Bluff. It turns northeast to its confluence with the Bourbeuse at 38°20′29″N 91°07′36″W approximately four miles north of Stanton. The stream gains the water of two named springs, Sour Spring west of the conservation area and Kratz Spring north of the conservation area.

Spring Creek was named for the fact its flow is increased by springs along its course.

== See also ==
- List of rivers of Missouri
