= List of rivers of Missouri =

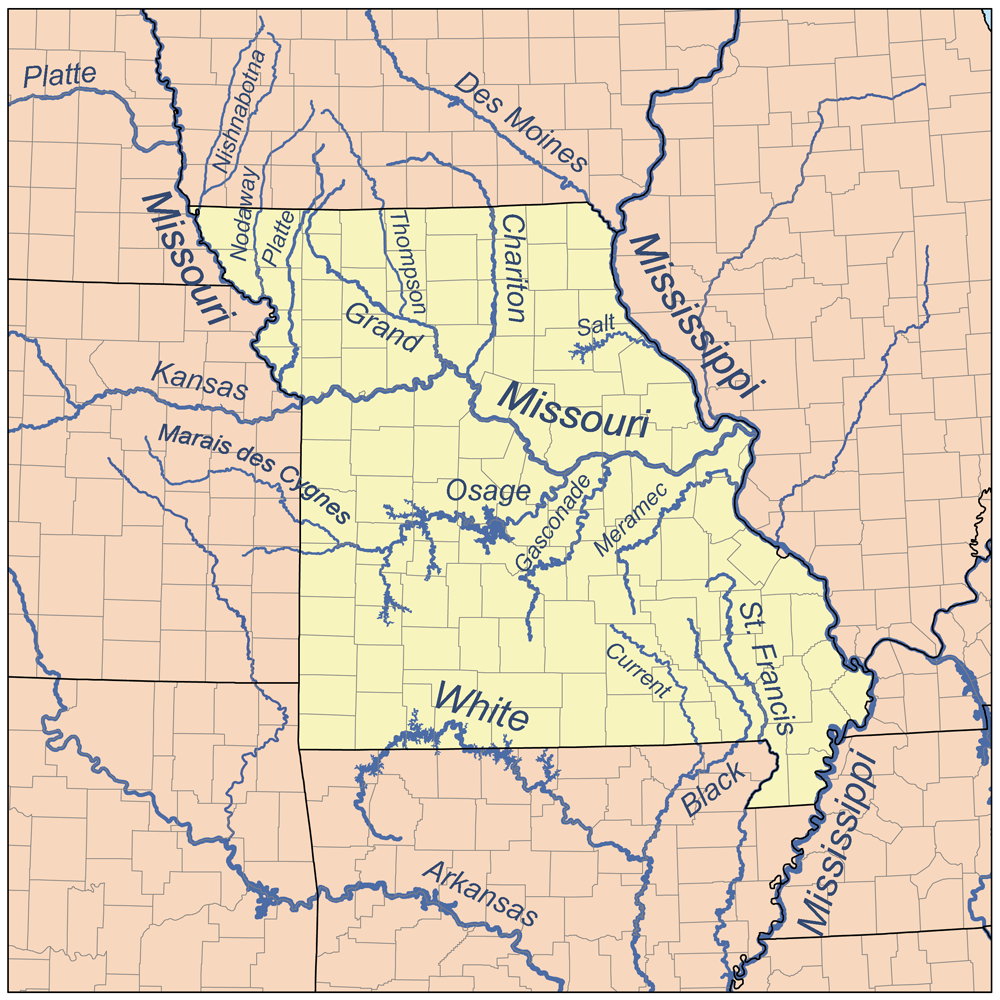
Map of major Missouri rivers

This page is a list of rivers in the U.S. state of Missouri.

== By drainage basin ==
This list is arranged by drainage basin, with respective tributaries indented under each larger stream's name.

=== Mississippi River ===
==== Arkansas River ====
- Neosho River (KS, OK)
  - Elk River
    - Buffalo Creek
    - Indian Creek
    - Big Sugar Creek
    - Little Sugar Creek
  - Spring River
    - Shoal Creek
      - Capps Creek
    - Stahl Creek

==== White River ====
- Cache River
- Black River
  - Spring River
    - Warm Fork Spring River
      - Anthony Branch
      - Mill Stone Branch
    - Eleven Point River
  - Current River
    - Sinking Creek
    - Little Black River
    - Jacks Fork
  - Logan Creek
    - Webb Creek
      - Potter Branch
    - Adair Creek
- North Fork River
  - Bennetts Bayou
  - Bennetts River
  - Bryant Creek
    - Brush Creek
    - Hunter Creek
      - Whites Creek
    - Fox Creek
    - Rippee Creek
    - Spring Creek
  - Clifty Creek
- Little North Fork White River
- Beaver Creek
  - Cowskin Creek
    - Prairie Creek
  - Little Beaver Creek
- James River
  - Crane Creek
  - Finley Creek
  - Pierson Creek
  - Wilsons Creek
    - Terrell Creek
    - Jordan Creek
    - Fassnight Creek
- Kings River
  - Osage Creek
- Roaring River

==== Mississippi River between the White and Missouri rivers ====
- St. Francis River
  - Little River
    - Castor River
    - Whitewater River
  - Mingo Creek
    - Stanley Creek
  - Big Lake Creek
    - Seitz Branch
    - Persimmon Branch
    - Julian Branch
  - Hubble Creek
    - Bounds Creek
    - Peters Branch
  - Clark Creek
    - Peachtree Fork
  - Big Creek
    - Kinney Branch
  - Little St. Francis River
  - O'Bannon Creek
- Headwater Diversion Channel
  - Whitewater River
  - Castor River
    - Turkey Creek
      - Gizzard Creek
- Old River
- River aux Vases
- Meramec River
  - Mattese Creek
  - Big River
    - Mineral Fork
      - Bourgawich Branch
    - Terre Bleue Creek
      - Andrews Branch
  - Bourbeuse River
    - Roth Creek
    - Spring Creek
      - Lollar Branch
      - Winsel Creek
    - Little Bourbeuse River
  - Little Meramec River
  - Huzzah Creek
    - Courtois Creek
      - Abbott Branch
      - Doss Branch
        - Bass Branch
    - Shoal Creek
  - Dry Fork
    - Hyer Branch
- River des Peres

==== Missouri River south of the Kansas River ====
- Loutre River
- Quick Creek
- Gasconade River
  - Big Piney River
  - Roubidoux Creek
  - Osage Fork Gasconade River
- Auxvasse Creek
- Middle River
- Osage River
  - Maries River
    - Little Maries River
  - Tavern Creek
  - Grandglaize Creek
    - Wet Glaize Creek
    - Dry Auglaize Creek
  - Niangua River
    - Dousinbury Creek
    - Little Niangua River
  - Deer Creek
    - Sarvis Branch
  - McCalls Branch
  - South Grand River
    - Dillion Creek
    - Big Creek
      - Minor Creek
      - Claybaugh Creek
    - Mormon Fork
  - Pomme de Terre River
    - Little Sac River
      - North Dry Sac River
        - Sims Branch
      - South Dry Sac River
  - Little Osage River
    - Marmaton River
      - Green River
  - Marais des Cygnes River
- Moreau River
- Petite Saline Creek
  - Stephens Branch
    - Gartners Branch
    - Hutchison Branch
- Lamine River
  - Blackwater River 55 miles (89 km)
- Little Chariton River
  - East Fork Little Chariton River 100 miles (160 km)
    - Walnut Creek
    - Silver Creek
      - Turner Fork
  - Middle Fork Little Chariton River 63 miles (101 km)
- Chariton River
  - Bee Branch
  - Elm Creek
  - Mussel Fork
    - Clarks Creek
  - Shoal Creek
- Grand River
  - Locust Creek
    - Strawberry Branch
  - Medicine Creek
  - Thompson River
    - Weldon River
      - Little River
  - Middle Fork Grand River
    - Peddler Creek
- Wakenda Creek
  - Crabapple Creek
- Crooked River
- Fishing River
- Reagan Branch
- Little Blue River
  - Lumpkins Fork
- Blue River
  - Indian Creek
    - Dyke Branch
  - Brush Creek
  - Round Grove Creek

==== Missouri River north of the Kansas River ====
- Platte River
  - Prairie Creek
  - Little Platte River
  - One Hundred and Two River
    - White Cloud Creek
  - Third Fork Platte River
    - Little Third Fork Platte River
  - Castile Creek
  - Honey Creek
- Nodaway River
  - Mill Creek
  - Arapahoe Creek
  - Elkhorn Creek
  - Long Branch
  - Wolf Creek
  - Opossum Branch
  - Twomile Branch
  - Clear Creek
- Squaw Creek
- Tarkio River
- Rock Creek
- Nishnabotna River

==== Mississippi River north of the Missouri River ====
- Cuivre River
  - Irvine Branch
- Salt River
  - Spencer River
    - Hippo Branch
  - Ely Creek
  - Ely Branch
  - Elm Branch
  - Black Creek
    - Pollard Branch
    - Hilton Branch
- South River
- North River
- Fabius River
  - North Fabius River
    - Middle Fabius River
      - Betsy Branch
      - Blair Branch
      - Hilbert Branch
      - Bridge Creek
    - Bear Creek
  - South Fabius River
    - Bethel Branch
    - Troublesome Creek
      - Hawkins Branch
      - Cottey Creek
    - Brower Branch
    - Little Fabius River
    - Coon Creek
- Wyaconda River
  - Little Wyaconda River
- Fox River
  - Little Fox River
- Des Moines River
  - Rollins Creek

== Alphabetically ==
- Allen Branch (Doe Run Creek tributary)
- Allen Branch (Troublesome Creek tributary)
- Allen Creek (Elk Fork Salt River tributary)
- Allen Creek (Scotland County, Missouri)
- Arapahoe Creek
- Aslinger Branch
- Baker Branch
- Baker Creek
- Barren Creek
- Bear Creek
- Bennetts River
- Benton Creek
- Bessen Hollow
- Bethel Branch
- Betsy Branch
- Big Piney River
- Big River (142 miles (229 km))
- Big Sugar Creek
- Billups Branch
- Billys Branch
- Black Jack Creek
- Black River (300 miles (480 km))
- Blackwater River (55 miles (89 km))
- Blair Branch
- Blairs Creek
- Blue River
- Blue Spring Creek
- Bobs Creek
- Bogard Creek
- Bollinger Creek
- Boone Creek
- Bourbeuse River (147 miles (237 km))
- Bourgawich Branch
- Bounds Creek
- Boyd Branch
- Brazil Creek
- Bridge Creek
- Brower Branch
- Brush Creek (Blue River tributary)
- Brush Creek (Bourbeuse River tributary)
- Buffalo Creek
- Burr Oak Creek
- Bussell Branch
- Byar Branch
- Cache River (213 miles (343 km))
- Capps Creek
- Carter Creek (Current River tributary)
- Carter Creek (Meramec River tributary)
- Casselman Branch
- Castor River
- Cave Spring Branch
- Cedar Creek (Des Moines River tributary)
- Cedar Creek (Missouri River tributary)
- Cedar Creek (Sac River tributary)
- Chariton River (280 miles (450 km))
- Cherry Valley Creek
- Clarks Creek
- Clear Creek
- Clevinger Branch
- Coldwater Creek (Missouri river tributary)
- Coldwater Creek (South Grand River tributary)
- Coldwater Creek (Saline Creek tributary)
- Coon Creek
- Cottey Creek
- Courtois Creek
- Crabapple Creek
- Cragg Branch
- Crane Creek
- Crockett Creek
- Crooked Creek
- Crooked River (60 miles (97 km))
- Cuivre River
- Current River (225 miles (362 km))
- Deer Creek
- Des Moines River 525 miles (845 km)
- Dillion Creek
- Dousinbury Creek
- Dugan Branch
- Dyke Branch
- Eleven Point River
- Elk River 80 miles (130 km)
- Elkhorn Creek
- Elm Branch
- Ely Branch
- Ely Creek
- Fabius River 230 miles (370 km)
- Fishing River
- Flanery Branch
- Florida Creek
- Fox Creek
- Fox River
- Frene Creek
- Fretwell Branch
- Gal Branch
- Galbreath Creek
- Gartners Branch
- Gasconade River 265 miles (426 km)
- Gizzard Creek
- Grand River 226 miles (364 km)
- Grandglaize Creek
- Green River
- Greens Creek
- Gribler Creek
- Gunnis Creek
- Hamilton Creek
- Hardin Creek
- Harless Creek
- Harman Creek
- Hawkins Branch
- Hickory Creek
- Highly Creek
- Hilbert Branch
- Hippo Branch
- Hobo Branch
- Holmes Creek
- Honey Creek (Fox River tributary)
- Honey Creek (Limestone Creek tributary)
- Honey Creek (Moreau River tributary)
- Horseshoe Branch
- Hubble Creek
- Huff Creek
- Hutchison Branch
- Huzzah Creek
- Hyer Branch
- Indian Creek
- Ivy Branch
- Jacks Fork
- James River
- James Branch
- Jones Branch (Crooked Creek tributary)
- Jones Branch (One Hundred and Two River tributary)
- Joslin Branch
- Julian Branch
- Kallambah Branch
- Kelley Branch
- Kelly Branch
- Kings River
- Kinney Branch
- Lamine River 70 miles (110 km)
- Lazy Branch
- Lick Creek
- Lincoln Creek
- Little Black River
- Little Blue River
- Little Bourbeuse River
- Little Chariton River
- Little Fabius River
- Little Fox River
- Little Maries River
- Little Meramec River
- Little Niangua River 40 miles (64 km)
- Little Osage River
- Little Platte River
- Little Pomme de Terre River
- Little River (Iowa–Missouri), tributary of Weldon River
- Little River (St. Francis River tributary)
- Little Sac River
- Little St. Francis River
- Little Sugar Creek
- Little Wyaconda River
- Locust Creek
- Lollar Branch
- Long Branch
- Lost Creek (Courtois Creek tributary)
- Lost Creek (Cuivre River tributary)
- Lost Creek (Grand River tributary)
- Loutre River
- Low Wassie Creek
- Lumpkins Fork
- Marais des Cygnes River 140 miles (230 km)
- Maries River
- Marmaton River
- Martigney Creek
- Mattese Creek
- McCalls Branch
- McMullen Branch
- Meramec River
- Merrell Branch
- Middle River
- Mill Creek
- Mill Rock Creek
- Mill Stone Branch
- Mingo Creek
- Missouri River
- Mississippi River
- Moreau River
- Mormon Fork
- Mozingo Creek
- Muddy Creek
- Niangua River
- Nishnabotna River
- Nodaway River
- Norris Creek
- North Dry Sac River
- North Fork River
- North River
- O'Bannon Creek
- One Hundred and Two River
- Old River
- Opossum Branch
- Osage River
- Panther Creek
- Peach Creek
- Peachtree Fork
- Peddler Creek
- Persimmon Branch
- Peters Branch
- Pickerel Creek
- Pisgah Branch
- Platte River
- Plumb Branch
- Pollard Branch
- Pomme de Terre River 113 miles (182 km)
- Potter Branch
- Prairie Creek
- Pryors Branch
- Quick Creek
- River des Peres
- Roaring River
- Rock Branch
- Rock Creek
- Rollins Creek
- Roubidoux Creek
- Sac River 107 miles (172 km)
- St. Francis River 470 miles (760 km)
- Saling Branch
- Salt River
- Sarvis Branch
- Scattering Branch
- Searcy Branch
- Sees Creek
- Seitz Branch
- Shoal Creek
- Sims Branch
- Sink Creek
- Skinner Creek
- Snowden Branch
- South Grand River
- South River
- Spring River (Arkansas), of Missouri and Arkansas 57 miles (92 km)
- Spring River (Missouri), of Missouri, Kansas and Oklahoma
- Squaw Creek
- Stahl Creek
- Stanley Creek
- Straight Branch
- Strawberry Branch
- Stuerman Branch
- Sweet Oak Branch
- Taff Branch
- Tarkio River
- Taum Sauk Creek
- Terrell Creek
- Terrible Creek
- Thompson River
- Todd Branch
- Troublesome Creek
- Turkey Creek
- Twomile Branch
- Wakenda Creek
- Weldon River
- White Cloud Creek
- White River 722 miles (1,162 km)
- Whites Creek
- Whittenburg Creek
- Whitewater River
- Wilsons Creek
- Winsel Creek
- Wolf Branch
- Wolf Creek
- Wyaconda River

== See also ==
- List of rivers of the United States
- State Line Slough (Missouri)
