= Fabius River =

Stream in Iowa and Missouri, U.S.

Coordinates: 39°53′15″N 91°27′17″W

The Fabius River (pronounced FAY-bee-us) is a 3.5-mile-long (5.6 km) tributary of the Mississippi River in northeastern Missouri in the United States. It is formed near its mouth by the confluence of the North Fabius River and the South Fabius River. The North Fabius River also flows through southeastern Iowa. The Middle Fabius River joins the North Fabius 8.9 miles (14.3 km) upstream of that river's mouth.

Each of the three rivers have been subjected to substantial straightening and channelization.

According to tradition, the Fabius River is named for the Roman consul Quintus Fabius Maximus Verrucosus. However, the State Historical Society of Missouri suggests Fabius actually was the name of a French pioneer in the area.

== Course ==
=== North Fabius River ===
The North Fabius River, about 109 miles (175 km) long, is the longest of the three forks and rises near Moulton in southwestern Appanoose County, Iowa. It flows generally southeastwardly through Davis County in Iowa and Schuyler, Scotland, Knox, Clark, Lewis and Marion counties in Missouri, past the towns of Memphis and Monticello, both in Missouri. In its upper course it collects two short tributaries known as the North Fork North Fabius River and the South Fork North Fabius River. At Taylor, Missouri, the North Fork averages a discharge of 467 cubic feet per second.

=== Middle Fabius River ===
The Middle Fabius River, about 76 miles (122 km) long, is formed in Scotland County by the confluence of the North Fork Middle Fabius River and the South Fork Middle Fabius River, both of which rise in Schuyler County. It flows generally southeastwardly through Knox and Lewis counties, and joins the North Fabius River in southeastern Lewis County. The Middle Fork has a mean annual discharge of 386 cubic feet per second at Ewing, Missouri

=== South Fabius River ===
The South Fabius River, about 82 miles (132 km) long, is formed in Knox County by the confluence of the North Fork South Fabius River and the South Fork South Fabius River. The North Fork rises in Schuyler County and flows through Adair County, and the South Fork rises in Adair County; both flow past the town of Edina. The South Fabius flows generally south-southeastwardly through Knox, Lewis, Shelby and Marion counties, past the town of Newark. Near Newark it collects the Little Fabius River, which rises near Hurdland and flows for its entire length in Knox County. The South Fabius River's average discharge at Taylor is approximately 440 cubic feet per second.

=== Lower river ===
The North and South Fabius rivers join to form the Fabius River in northeastern Marion County. The natural confluence of the rivers was about 1 mile (2 km) upstream of the Fabius River's mouth at the Mississippi River, but the North Fabius River has been re-routed by channelization, and now joins the South Fabius River about 3 miles (5 km) upstream of the Mississippi. The Fabius flows into the Mississippi River about three miles downstream of Quincy, Illinois. The Fabius River averages approximately 907 cubic feet per second at the junction of the North and South Fabius rivers. This discharge is obtained by combining the discharges of the North and South forks,(see above), since the Fabius has never been measured by the USGS.

== See also ==
- List of Iowa rivers
- List of Missouri rivers

== Sources ==
- Columbia Gazetteer of North America entry
- DeLorme (1998). Iowa Atlas & Gazetteer. Yarmouth, Maine: DeLorme. ISBN 0-89933-214-5.
- DeLorme (2002). Missouri Atlas & Gazetteer. Yarmouth, Maine: DeLorme. ISBN 0-89933-353-2.
