= Tornado outbreak of May 19–22, 1957 =

Weather event in the United States

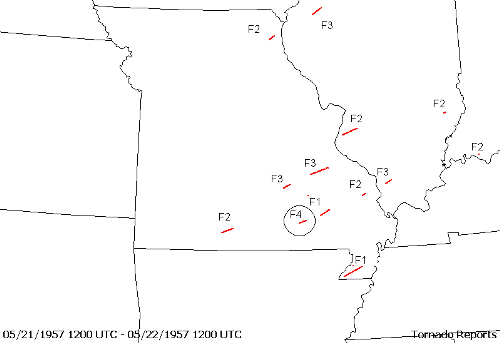
- Map of tornadoes on May 21, highlighting the Fremont F4

Tornado outbreak
- Tornadoes: 59
- Max. rating: F5 tornado
- Duration: May 19–22, 1957
- Largest hail: 7 in (18 cm)

Overall effects
- Fatalities: 59
- Injuries: 341
- Areas affected: Primarily Central United States
- Part of the tornadoes and tornado outbreaks of 1957

From May 19–22, 1957, a tornado outbreak took place across the US Central Plains. A total of 59 tornadoes were reported from Colorado to the Mississippi Valley. (Note: An outbreak is generally defined as a group of at least six tornadoes (the number sometimes varies slightly according to local climatology) with no more than a six-hour gap between individual tornadoes. An outbreak sequence, prior to (after) the start of modern records in 1950, is defined as a period of no more than two (one) consecutive days without at least one significant (F2 or stronger) tornado.) (Note: All damage totals are in 1957 United States dollars unless otherwise noted.) The most destructive tornado of the severe weather event—likely part of a long-lived family—was rated as an F5, the highest level, and is often called the Ruskin Heights tornado, after the site of its worst damage, a suburb and housing development in southern Kansas City, Missouri. Additionally, a powerful F4 tornado virtually destroyed Fremont, Missouri, claiming seven lives, and an F3 tornado killed eight others in and near Belgrade, Missouri. A pair of F4s—one in Minnesota, the other in Kansas—also neared F5 intensity. In all, 59 people were killed during the outbreak, including 44 in the Ruskin Heights tornado.

== Background ==
The outbreak coincided with elevated tornado activity: the period May 19–26 was one of the most intense to date, since the founding of the United States Weather Bureau. At 00:30 UTC (7:30 p.m. CDT) on May 20, a 75-to-80-knot (86 to 92 mph; 139 to 148 km/h) mid-level jet stream bisected dew points of 65 °F (18 °C), coincident with a 986-millibar (29.1 inHg) low-pressure area and warm front over southeastern Nebraska. Soundings and surface weather observations indicated a robust, unstable warm sector, showing 3,000 j/kg of surface-based convective available potential energy (CAPE) and the presence of strong wind shear. Favoring supercells, this setup led to the then largest one-day total of tornadoes in Weather Bureau history. At 17:00 UTC (12:00 p.m. CDT) the Severe Local Storms Unit (SELS) in Kansas City had already issued a severe weather watch, mentioning tornadoes, for the Kansas–Nebraska state line and its environs. Subsequent updates covered much of the eastern Great Plains, from the Green Country to southeastern Nebraska. Upon formation, severe thunderstorms traveled at up to 42 mph (68 km/h), attended by extremely large hail.

== Outbreak statistics ==
Outbreak death toll
State	Total	County	County total
Kansas	7	Franklin	3
Kansas	7	Miami	4
Missouri	52	Carter	7
Missouri	52	Jackson	37
Missouri	52	St. Francois	8
Totals	59		
All deaths were tornado-related

== Confirmed tornadoes ==
Confirmed tornadoes by Fujita rating
FU	F0	F1	F2	F3	F4	F5	Total
0	13	16	19	7	3	1	59

Several unconfirmed tornadoes were also reported:

- May 20: tornadoes were reported south of Solomon Rapids, Kansas, and east of Concordia, Kansas.

Prior to 1990, there is a likely undercount of tornadoes, particularly E/F0–1, with reports of weaker tornadoes becoming more common as population increased. A sharp increase in the annual average E/F0–1 count by approximately 200 tornadoes was noted upon the implementation of NEXRAD Doppler weather radar in 1990–1991. (Note: Historically, the number of tornadoes globally and in the United States was and is likely underrepresented: research by Grazulis on annual tornado activity suggests that, as of 2001, only 53% of yearly U.S. tornadoes were officially recorded. Documentation of tornadoes outside the United States was historically less exhaustive, owing to the lack of monitors in many nations and, in some cases, to internal political controls on public information. Most countries only recorded tornadoes that produced severe damage or loss of life. Significant low biases in U.S. tornado counts likely occurred through the early 1990s, when advanced NEXRAD was first installed and the National Weather Service began comprehensively verifying tornado occurrences.) 1974 marked the first year where significant tornado (E/F2+) counts became homogenous with contemporary values, attributed to the consistent implementation of Fujita scale assessments. (Note: The Fujita scale was devised under the aegis of scientist T. Theodore Fujita in the early 1970s. Prior to the advent of the scale in 1971, tornadoes in the United States were officially unrated. Tornado ratings were retroactively applied to events prior to the formal adoption of the F-scale by the National Weather Service. While the Fujita scale has been superseded by the Enhanced Fujita scale in the U.S. since February 1, 2007, Canada used the old scale until April 1, 2013; nations elsewhere, like the United Kingdom, apply other classifications such as the TORRO scale.) Numerous discrepancies on the details of tornadoes in this outbreak exist between sources. The total count of tornadoes and ratings differs from various agencies accordingly. The list below documents information from the most contemporary official sources alongside assessments from tornado historian Thomas P. Grazulis.

=== May 19 event ===
Confirmed tornadoes — Sunday, May 19, 1957 (Note: All dates are based on the local time zone where the tornado touched down; however, all times are in Coordinated Universal Time and dates are split at midnight CST/CDT for consistency.)
F#	Location	County / Parish	State	Start Coord. (Note: All starting coordinates are based on the NCEI database and may not reflect contemporary analyses)	Time (UTC)	Path length	Width (Note: The listed width values are primarily the average/mean width of the tornadoes, with those having known maximum widths denoted by ♯. From 1952 to 1994, reports largely list mean width whereas contemporary years list maximum width. Values provided by Grazulis are the average width, with estimates being rounded down (i.e. 0.5 mi (0.80 km) is rounded down from 880 yards to 800 yards.)	Damage
F1	ESE of West Park	Fresno	CA	36.70°N 119.83°W	16:18–16:23	0.1 mi (0.16 km)	33 yd (30 m)	$30
F1	A brief tornado—the third on record in the Fresno area—tore loose roof shingles, downed an almond tree, and mangled a rooftop air conditioning unit.							
F1	NW of Bayard	Scotts Bluff	NE	41.80°N 103.37°W	01:30–?	1.7 mi (2.7 km)	33 yd (30 m)	$30
F1	Watched by highway patrol, this tornado did little or no damage.							
F2	S of Vance	Morrill	NE	41.75°N 103.12°W	03:30–?	5.1 mi (8.2 km)	67 yd (61 m)	$25,000
F2	This tornado blew a farmhouse off its foundation and stripped most of its roof. It destroyed outbuildings on a few farms as well. According to the Climatological Data National Summary, this tornado hit 6 1/2 mi (10.5 km) west of Bayard, implying touchdown in Scotts Bluff County.							
F1	W of Gurley	Cheyenne	NE	41.32°N 102.98°W	04:00–?	2 mi (3.2 km)	33 yd (30 m)	$25,000
F1	This tornado damaged outbuildings.							

=== May 20 event ===
Confirmed tornadoes — Monday, May 20, 1957
F#	Location	County / Parish	State	Start Coord.	Time (UTC)	Path length	Width	Damage
F0	SSE of Bethune (CO) to near Herndon (KS)	Kit Carson (CO), Sherman (KS), Cheyenne (KS), Rawlins (KS)	CO, KS	39.25°N 102.40°W	17:00–19:35	70.1 mi (112.8 km)	33 yd (30 m)	$310
F0	This tornado, once officially rated F2, caused very little damage. It was likely a family of several weak events.							
F0	Southeastern Phillipsburg	Phillips	KS	39.75°N 99.32°W	17:55–18:10	1 mi (1.6 km)	300 yd (270 m)	Unknown
F0	Details are unavailable.							
F0	N of Downs	Osborne	KS	39.55°N 98.55°W	19:15–?	0.1 mi (0.16 km)	33 yd (30 m)	Unknown
F0	This tornado felled a shed, wires, and trees.							
F0	SW of Hunter	Mitchell	KS	39.23°N 98.40°W	19:25–?	0.1 mi (0.16 km)	33 yd (30 m)	Unknown
F0	Details are unavailable.							
F1	N of Burr Oak	Jewell	KS	39.92°N 98.30°W	20:05–?	5.7 mi (9.2 km)	300 yd (270 m)	$25,000
F1	Sounding train-like, this tornado damaged three homes and many outbuildings.							
F0	N of Red Cloud	Webster	NE	40.10°N 98.52°W	20:15–?	0.1 mi (0.16 km)	33 yd (30 m)	$30
F0	A brief tornado hit nothing substantial.							
F1	NE of Broken Bow	Custer	NE	41.43°N 99.62°W	20:17–20:20	2.7 mi (4.3 km)	33 yd (30 m)	$30
F1	This tornado caused little damage.							
F0	E of Guide Rock	Nuckolls	NE	40.07°N 98.27°W	20:20–?	0.1 mi (0.16 km)	33 yd (30 m)	$30
F0	Noted by highway patrol, this tornado caused little or no damage.							
F4	ENE of Glasco to NW of Morrowville	Cloud, Republic, Washington	KS	39.38°N 97.73°W	20:50–?	44.6 mi (71.8 km)	400 yd (370 m)	$250,000
F4	Part of a family, this violent tornado struck 12 farms at F4 intensity, at one point approaching F5 status. The main event, it destroyed an entire farm near Haddam, and was accompanied by at least four—possibly up to eight—satellite tornadoes, along with many funnel clouds. The storm that produced the tornado damaged a 50-to-60-mile-long (80 to 97 km) swath.							
F2	SSE of Concordia	Cloud	KS	39.52°N 97.63°W	20:50–?	0.1 mi (0.16 km)	33 yd (30 m)	Unknown
F2	Details are unknown. Grazulis did not list the tornado as an F2 or stronger.							
F2	W of Huscher	Cloud	KS	39.52°N 97.63°W	20:50–?	0.1 mi (0.16 km)	33 yd (30 m)	Unknown
F2	This tornado destroyed a barn.							
F2	SW of Huscher	Cloud	KS	39.47°N 97.63°W	20:50–?	0.1 mi (0.16 km)	33 yd (30 m)	Unknown
F2	Details are unknown. Grazulis did not list the tornado as an F2 or stronger.							
F3	E of Rice to E of Hollis	Cloud	KS	39.57°N 97.57°W	20:50–?	6.1 mi (9.8 km)	33 yd (30 m)	Unknown
F3	This tornado destroyed a barn. Grazulis rated it F2.							
F1	WSW of Anselmo	Custer	NE	41.60°N 99.93°W	21:00–?	0.1 mi (0.16 km)	33 yd (30 m)	$2,500
F1	This tornado mainly affected remote areas.							
F1	N of Rockerville	Pennington	SD	43.97°N 103.35°W	21:00–?	0.1 mi (0.16 km)	33 yd (30 m)	$2,500
F1	This tornado blew down a barn.							
F2	W of Reynolds to E of Palmyra	Thayer, Jefferson, Saline, Lancaster	NE	40.07°N 97.50°W	22:00–?	75.3 mi (121.2 km)	33 yd (30 m)	$250,000
F2	This tornado hit more than 12 farms, destroying barns, and unroofed homes as well. On a farm it killed upward of 500 turkeys. In all, the tornado struck "15 sets" of structures. Grazulis listed a 30-mile (48 km) path.							
F2	Doniphan to NE of Phillips	Hall, Hamilton	NE	40.77°N 98.37°W	23:00–?	18.2 mi (29.3 km)	33 yd (30 m)	Unknown
F2	Producing scattered damage, this tornado hit three farms, one of them at "near-F3" intensity.							
F2	S of Maysville to NNE of Weatherby	DeKalb	MO	39.85°N 94.35°W	23:00–?	9.8 mi (15.8 km)	200 yd (180 m)	$25,000
F2	This tornado hit eight farms, destroying buildings, including two or more barns.							
F0	N of Pawnee	Pawnee	OK	36.35°N 96.80°W	23:00–?	0.5 mi (0.80 km)	100 yd (91 m)	$30
F0	A brief tornado snapped power lines and damaged roofing.							
F2	NE of Friend to N of Emerald	Saline, Gage, Lancaster	NE	40.68°N 97.25°W	23:20–?	23.9 mi (38.5 km)	33 yd (30 m)	$25,000
F2	This tornado intermittently touched down, destroying a few barns.							
F0	S of Hartford	Lyon	KS	38.23°N 96.00°W	23:45–?	0.5 mi (0.80 km)	100 yd (91 m)	$250
F0	A weak tornado damaged windows, roofs, and trees.							
F2	NE of Hominy	Osage	OK	36.42°N 96.38°W	23:45–?	0.1 mi (0.16 km)	33 yd (30 m)	$25,000
F2	This tornado collapsed a warehouse, damaging equipment inside, and mangled girders. Grazulis did not rate it F2 or stronger.							
F2	NW of Prague	Lincoln	OK	35.50°N 96.70°W	00:00–?	0.1 mi (0.16 km)	33 yd (30 m)	$2,500
F2	This tornado hit at least eight farms, downing outbuildings, fences, and trees. It also damaged farmhouses.							
F0	NW of Madison	Greenwood	KS	38.17°N 96.17°W	00:15–?	1 mi (1.6 km)	100 yd (91 m)	Unknown
F0	This tornado caused minimal damage to old sheds, trees, and roofs.							
F5	SW of Williamsburg (KS) to E of Raytown (MO)	Franklin (KS), Miami (KS), Johnson (KS), Jackson (MO)	KS, MO	38.45°N 95.50°W	00:15–01:53	71 mi (114 km)	440 yd (400 m)	$2,500,000
F5	44 deaths – See article on this tornado – 531 people were injured.							
F0	WNW of Kiefer	Creek	OK	35.95°N 96.08°W	01:00–?	0.1 mi (0.16 km)	33 yd (30 m)	Unknown
F0	This tornado killed a cow and destroyed outbuildings.							
F0	E of Hogshooter	Nowata	OK	36.70°N 95.77°W	01:00–?	0.1 mi (0.16 km)	33 yd (30 m)	$30
F0	This tornado tore up a 500-yard-long (1,500 ft) stretch of fence and blew an oil tank into a ditch.							
F1	Northern Broken Arrow	Tulsa	OK	36.07°N 95.80°W	01:30–?	3.6 mi (5.8 km)	500 yd (460 m)	$250,000
F1	This tornado moved through town, causing roof and other damage—mostly minimal—to roughly 200 homes, one of which lost its roof entirely. The tornado also overturned cars, downed trees, and destroyed outbuildings. Grazulis rated it F2.							
F3	Homewood	Franklin	KS	38.50°N 95.43°W	01:37–?	5.6 mi (9.0 km)	33 yd (30 m)	Unknown
F3	This tornado may have been related to or the same as the Ruskin Heights F5. Grazulis did not rate it F2 or stronger. Further details are unavailable.							
F2	N of Sibley to Richmond	Jackson, Ray	MO	39.20°N 94.20°W	01:37–?	12.8 mi (20.6 km)	33 yd (30 m)	$25,000
F2	Related to the Ruskin Heights F5, this tornado caused "considerable" damage, and strewed debris over a 40-acre (16 ha) field. However, Grazulis did not rate it F2 or stronger.							
F0	SW of Beggs	Okmulgee	OK	35.70°N 96.12°W	02:04–?	0.1 mi (0.16 km)	33 yd (30 m)	$30
F0	Seen by Ground Observer Corps, this tornado apparently did little or no damage.							
F1	W of Chelsea	Rogers	OK	36.53°N 95.47°W	04:30–?	0.1 mi (0.16 km)	33 yd (30 m)	Unknown
F1	This tornado uplifted and shifted a home. It also leveled many outbuildings.							

=== May 21 event ===
Confirmed tornadoes — Tuesday, May 21, 1957
F#	Location	County / Parish	State	Start Coord.	Time (UTC)	Path length	Width	Damage
F1	NW of Centralia	Craig	OK	36.80°N 95.38°W	05:00–?	0.1 mi (0.16 km)	33 yd (30 m)	$30
F1	This tornado extensively damaged ranchland, hitting a farmhouse and outbuildings.							
F1	NE of Vinita	Craig	OK	36.65°N 95.13°W	05:00–?	0.1 mi (0.16 km)	33 yd (30 m)	$30
F1	This tornado uplifted roofing and damaged a trio of barns.							
F3	SW of Spavinaw to NE of Jay	Mayes, Delaware	OK	35.35°N 95.08°W	05:10–?	20.4 mi (32.8 km)	200 yd (180 m)	$5,000
F3	Passing near Lone Chapel, this tornado destroyed or damaged 40 outbuildings, a home, and a barn. The tornado caused an injury as well. Grazulis rated it F2.							
F1	NE of Staples	Todd, Cass	MN	46.35°N 94.78°W	18:00–?	3.8 mi (6.1 km)	300 yd (270 m)	$25,000
F1	This tornado splintered pine trees. It also destroyed a garage and barn. Grazulis rated it F2.							
F4	E of Rush City	Chisago	MN	45.58°N 92.87°W	19:00–?	9.2 mi (14.8 km)	100 yd (91 m)	$25,000
F4	This violent tornado sheared off 2-foot-thick (0.61 m) trees and produced borderline-F5 damage to a home. It destroyed a total of four homes and eight barns. It injured a few people as well.							
F3	SSE of Custer to E of Doss to NNE of Stone Hill	Dent	MO	37.55°N 91.50°W	21:00–?	10.2 mi (16.4 km)	440 yd (400 m)	$25,000
F3	This intense tornado destroyed three homes, one of which it leveled, and damaged a few others.							
F2	ENE of Brownbranch to Squires to WSW of Sweden	Taney, Douglas	MO	36.80°N 92.80°W	21:15–?	14.5 mi (23.3 km)	500 yd (460 m)	$250,000
F2	This tornado destroyed a home and school, forcing 11 students and a teacher to shelter underground in a farmhouse. Grazulis rated it F3.							
F1	WSW of Leeper to W of Silva	Wayne	MO	37.07°N 90.72°W	21:30–?	13 mi (21 km)	33 yd (30 m)	$2,500
F1	Possibly related to the Fremont F4, this tornado hit four farms, damaging structures. It also unroofed a few homes. Grazulis rated it F2.							
F1	SSW of Centerville	Reynolds	MO	37.42°N 90.97°W	21:45–?	0.2 mi (0.32 km)	17 yd (16 m)	$30
F1	This tornado damaged a number of buildings.							
F3	SE of Sunlight to Belgrade to Desloge	Washington, St. Francois	MO	37.77°N 90.92°W	21:45–?	22.2 mi (35.7 km)	400 yd (370 m)	$75,000,000
F3	8 deaths – This intense tornado destroyed 20% of Belgrade, as well as 24 barns and large, rural homes. It also destroyed structures at a school, in addition to multiple churches. It injured 50 people as well. An F4 tornado also hit Belgrade on March 19, 1948.							
F4	Fremont to Van Buren	Carter	MO	36.95°N 91.17°W	21:53–?	9.1 mi (14.6 km)	500 yd (460 m)	$250,000
F4	7 deaths – See section on this tornado – 75 people were injured.							
F2	WNW of Burfordville to ESE of Millersville	Cape Girardeau	MO	37.38°N 89.83°W	23:00–?	5.1 mi (8.2 km)	500 yd (460 m)	$25,000
F2	This tornado hit 12 farms, destroying four barns and damaging other structures. It also unroofed a home and felled trees.							
F2	E of Lewistown to northwestern Monticello to SW of Benjamin	Lewis	MO	40.08°N 91.78°W	23:30–?	7.4 mi (11.9 km)	400 yd (370 m)	$500,000
F2	This tornado unroofed and destroyed a three-story apartment, along with four homes. It also damaged a barn. A few injuries occurred.							
F2	S of Columbia to SE of Shiloh	Monroe, St. Clair	IL	38.42°N 90.20°W	21:50–?	19.7 mi (31.7 km)	150 yd (140 m)	$250,000
F2	This tornado hit Scott Air Force Base, but did its worst damage near Columbia. Grazulis did not rate it F2 or stronger.							
F2	SE of Claremont	Richland	IL	38.70°N 87.98°W	23:00–?	3.6 mi (5.8 km)	150 yd (140 m)	$25,000
F2	This tornado hit four farms, destroying a barn.							
F2	SSE of Wilton to ENE of Stockton	Cedar, Muscatine, Scott	IA	41.55°N 91.00°W	23:00–?	8.9 mi (14.3 km)	100 yd (91 m)	$250,000
F2	Perhaps part of a family, this tornado destroyed a grain elevator. It also hit four farms, destroying or damaging barns. Grazulis indicated a path near West Branch.							
F3	Alto Pass to ENE of Makanda	Union, Jackson	IL	37.57°N 89.32°W	00:07–?	8.5 mi (13.7 km)	200 yd (180 m)	$250,000
F3	This tornado destroyed 25 or more buildings and wrecked a high school. It also toppled 5,000 fruit trees. Grazulis rated it F2.							
F3	Southeastern Colmar	McDonough	IL	40.50°N 90.80°W	01:40–?	13.7 mi (22.0 km)	120 yd (110 m)	$250,000
F3	This intense tornado destroyed a few homes.							
F2	Paradise	Warrick	IN	37.97°N 87.28°W	02:03–?	0.1 mi (0.16 km)	33 yd (30 m)	$25,000
F2	This tornado lofted and spun a home 150 ft (46 m), injuring a few occupants. The roof of the home was moved 500 ft (150 m). Grazulis rated the tornado F3.							

=== May 22 event ===
Confirmed tornadoes — Wednesday, May 22, 1957
F#	Location	County / Parish	State	Start Coord.	Time (UTC)	Path length	Width	Damage
F1	E of Cardwell to N of Deering	Dunklin, Pemiscot	MO	36.05°N 90.27°W	05:45–?	23.7 mi (38.1 km)	33 yd (30 m)	$50,000
F1	This tornado damaged treetops, as well as the roofs of barns and homes. Shortly before dissipation, it wrecked all barns on a farmstead. Grazulis rated it F2.							
F1	W of Kennett	Dunklin	MO	36.23°N 90.07°W	05:45–?	0.1 mi (0.16 km)	10 yd (9.1 m)	$2,500
F1	This brief tornado damaged a 1-mile-long (1.6 km) stretch.							
F2	SSW of Carrollton	Carroll	KY	38.62°N 85.20°W	07:00–?	0.8 mi (1.3 km)	440 yd (400 m)	$25,000
F2	Hitting west of English, this tornado destroyed a quartet of barns and tore the roof off a home.							
F0	Southern Charleston	Charleston	SC	32.75°N 79.92°W	13:50–?	2 mi (3.2 km)	7 yd (6.4 m)	$30
F0	A waterspout moved ashore, causing little damage.							

=== Williamsburg−Spring Hill, Kansas/Ruskin Heights–Raytown, Missouri ===
Williamsburg−Spring Hill, Kansas/Ruskin Heights–Raytown, Missouri
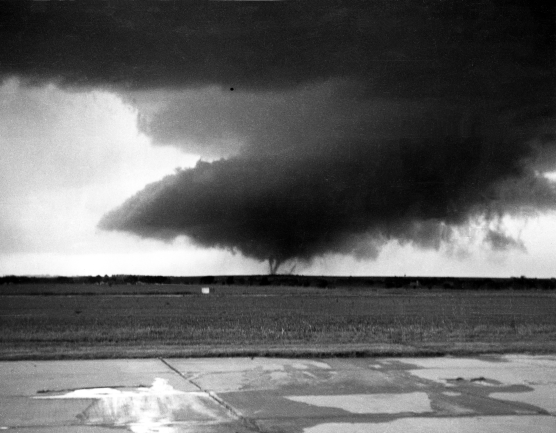
- The tornado in its formative stage, in Kansas

Meteorological history
- Formed: May 20, 1957, 7:15 p.m. CDT (UTC−05:00)
- Dissipated: May 20, 1957, 8:53 p.m. CDT (UTC−05:00)
- Duration: 1 hour and 38 minutes

F5 tornado
- on the Fujita scale
- Highest winds: >261 mph (420 km/h)

Overall effects
- Fatalities: 44
- Injuries: 531
- Damage: $2,500,000 ($28,660,000 in 2025 USD)

This violent, long-tracked, multiple-vortex event was likely a family of tornadoes. Forming near Williamsburg, it moved northeastward through several counties, producing near-continuous damage; a single tornado was likely present for 50 mi (80 km) or more. Around Homewood, the tornado was attended by up to 10 tentacle-like vortices or satellite tornadoes, producing major damage to rural property and carrying gravestones miles away. Passing near Ottawa, Rantoul, and Spring Hill, it leveled many homes and caused seven fatalities. It also damaged a drive-in, motel, and truck stop. South of Wellsville, the tornado may have dissipated and reformed; it then continued uninterruptedly for the rest of its life.

Along the Kansas–Missouri border the tornado followed a near-straight line, causing $1 million in losses in Kansas. Affecting the southern suburbs of Kansas City, it entered Missouri, tearing through Martin City, Hickman Mills, and Ruskin Heights, along with the northeastern side of Grandview. Housing incurred F5 damage, besides some businesses at a shopping center. Some areas were reportedly "swept clean", and a newly built brick school in Ruskin Heights was badly damaged. 85% of Martin City was uninhabitable. In all the tornado claimed 37 lives in Missouri and injured 500 or more people. Debris from Hickman Mills was found in Iowa, 165 mi (266 km) away, and other debris was carried aloft 30,000 ft (9,100 m; 5.7 mi; 9.1 km).

Historically, the 1957 F5 was not the only significant tornado to affect the area: an F3 tornado also affected Martin City and nearby Holmes Park on May 23, 1946, destroying or damaging chicken coops, silos, a marketplace, barns, and homes. The tornado killed a couple and injured five people.

=== Fremont–Van Buren, Missouri ===
Fremont–Van Buren, Missouri
Meteorological history
- Formed: May 21, 1957, 4:53 p.m. CDT (UTC−05:00)

F4 tornado
- on the Fujita scale

Overall effects
- Fatalities: 7
- Injuries: 75
- Damage: $250,000 ($2,870,000 in 2025 USD)

A cyclic supercell was likely responsible for this deadly, violent tornado, which probably formed over remote parts of the Mark Twain National Forest. The tornado, possibly a member of a long-lived family, did little or no damage before Fremont. Entering town, the tornado rendered unusable all but seven structures, causing "F5-appearing" damage. Hardest hit were schools, businesses, and homes on the eastern side of Fremont, along and near the railroad; these were poorly built, so the tornado was rated F4, but F5 winds could have occurred. A three-story brick school was nearly leveled, and trees in town were partly debarked. In all, the tornado badly damaged or destroyed 50 homes in Fremont, while causing lesser damage to 31 others. The tornado also severely damaged a dozen other buildings in town, as well as eight small businesses. Past Fremont, the tornado remained intense, damaging structures in Van Buren at "near-F3" intensity. In Van Buren the tornado destroyed 25 homes and severely damaged 35 more. It also badly damaged or destroyed 91 other structures and caused significant damage to three small businesses. In all, it damaged about half of Van Buren. Its path may have been 25 mi (40 km) long. Six of the seven fatalities were at Fremont, where over 25% of the population was killed or injured.

== See also ==
- List of North American tornadoes and tornado outbreaks
  - List of F5 and EF5 tornadoes

== Sources ==
- Agee, Ernest M.; Childs, Samuel (June 1, 2014). "Adjustments in Tornado Counts, F-Scale Intensity, and Path Width for Assessing Significant Tornado Destruction". Journal of Applied Meteorology and Climatology. 53 (6). American Meteorological Society: 1494–1505. doi:10.1175/JAMC-D-13-0235.1.
- Brewer, Carolyn Glenn (1997). Caught in the Path: the Fury of a Tornado, the Rebirth of a Community. Overland Park, Kansas: Leathers Publishing. ISBN 0-9655774-0-6 – via Internet Archive.
- Brooks, Harold E. (April 2004). "On the Relationship of Tornado Path Length and Width to Intensity". Weather and Forecasting. 19 (2): 310–19. Bibcode:2004WtFor..19..310B. doi:10.1175/1520-0434(2004)019<0310:OTROTP>2.0.CO;2.
- Cook, A. R.; Schaefer, J. T. (August 2008). "The Relation of El Niño–Southern Oscillation (ENSO) to Winter Tornado Outbreaks". Monthly Weather Review. 136 (8): 3121–3137. Bibcode:2008MWRv..136.3121C. doi:10.1175/2007MWR2171.1.
- Edwards, Roger; LaDue, James G.; Ferree, John T.; Scharfenberg, Kevin; Maier, Chris; Coulbourne, William L. (May 1, 2013). "Tornado Intensity Estimation: Past, Present, and Future". Bulletin of the American Meteorological Society. 94 (5). American Meteorological Society: 641–653. doi:10.1175/BAMS-D-11-00006.1.
- Grazulis, Thomas P. (May 1984). Violent Tornado Climatography, 1880–1982. OSTI (Technical report). NUREG. Washington, D.C.: Nuclear Regulatory Commission. OSTI 7099491. CR-3670.
  - — (November 1990). Significant Tornadoes 1880–1989. Vol. 2. St. Johnsbury, Vermont: The Tornado Project of Environmental Films. ISBN 1-879362-02-3.
  - — (July 1993). Significant Tornadoes 1680–1991: A Chronology and Analysis of Events. St. Johnsbury, Vermont: The Tornado Project of Environmental Films. ISBN 1-879362-03-1.
  - — (2001a). The Tornado: Nature's Ultimate Windstorm. Norman: University of Oklahoma Press. ISBN 978-0-8061-3538-0.
  - — (2001b). F5-F6 Tornadoes. St. Johnsbury, Vermont: The Tornado Project of Environmental Films.
- National Weather Service. Storm Data Publication (Report). National Centers for Environmental Information – via Storm Events Database.
- U.S. Weather Bureau (May 1957). "Storm data and unusual weather phenomena". Climatological Data National Summary. 8 (5). Asheville, North Carolina: National Climatic Data Center: 182–89.
