= Ashley Creek, Missouri =

Unincorporated community in Missouri, U.S.

Coordinates: 37°24′11″N 91°41′19″W

Ashley Creek is an unincorporated community in northeastern Texas County, in the U.S. state of Missouri. The community is located along South Ashley Creek, approximately 1.5 miles south of its confluence with North Ashley Creek to form Ashley Creek. The community is on a sharp meander of the stream and Ashley Creek church and cemetery are about one mile downstream. Montauk State Park on Pigeon Creek is about three miles to the north in Dent County.

== History ==
A post office called Ashley Creek was established in 1936, and remained in operation until 1951. The community takes its name from nearby South Ashley Creek.
