= Gladden Creek =

Stream in the U.S. state of Missouri

Gladden Creek is a stream in Dent and Shannon counties in the Ozarks of southern Missouri. It is a tributary of the Current River.

The stream headwaters are in Dent County at 37°32′33″N 91°28′44″W and the confluence with the Current is in Shannon County at 37°22′36″N 91°32′51″W. The source area for the stream lies about six miles south of Salem and it flows southeast to south generally parallel to and west of Missouri Route 19 past Custer and Gladden. It enters Shannon County just northwest of Rector and enters the Current River at Akers.

Gladden Creek has the name of the local Gladden family.

== See also ==
- List of rivers of Missouri
