= Ashley Creek =

Ashley Creek may refer to:

- Ashley Creek (Minnesota), a stream in Minnesota
- Ashley Creek (Current River tributary), a stream in Missouri
- Ashley Creek, Missouri, an unincorporated community
- Ashley Creek (Flathead River tributary), a stream in Montana
- Ashley Creek (Utah), a stream in Utah
