= Montauk =

Montauk derives from a place-name in the Mohegan-Montauk-Narragansett language. It can refer to:

- Montaukett, an Algonquian-speaking Native American group native to the eastern end of Long Island, though some were later exiled to Missouri

Montauk may also refer to:

== Geography ==
- Montauk, Missouri, an unincorporated area on the Current River
  - Montauk State Park (Missouri), a park near Salem, Missouri
- Montauk, New York, a hamlet in East Hampton, New York on Long Island
  - Montauk County Park, a park near the hamlet of Montauk which was previously named Theodore Roosevelt County Park
  - Montauk Downs State Park, a golf course in the hamlet of Montauk
  - Montauk Point State Park, the New York state park where the Montauk Point Light lighthouse is located

== Media ==
- Montauk (novel), a 1975 autobiographical novel by the Swiss writer Max Frisch
- The Montauk Project: Experiments in Time, a book inspired by the tale of the Montauk Project
- "Montauk", a song by Rufus Wainwright from his 2012 album, Out of the Game
- "Montauk", a song by Bayside from their 2005 album, Bayside
- "Mr. Montauk", a song by Snarky Puppy from their 2012 album, GroundUP

== Structures ==
- Montauk (Clermont, Iowa), the home of William Larrabee, the 12th Governor of Iowa, and his wife, Anna Matilda Larrabee
- Montauk Building, a high rise building that existed from 1883–1902 in Chicago
- Montauk Point Light , the lighthouse on the eastern tip of Long Island
- Montauk Project, a supposed secret US government project involving time travel near the Montauk Point Lighthouse in some conspiracy theories
- Montauk station, station of the Long Island Rail Road

== Vessels ==
- MV Montauk, a small oil tanker formerly owned by Sealift Incorporated
- USS Montauk (1862), a Civil War-era naval vessel in the United States

== In other uses ==
- Montauk Mantis, a record label
- Montauk Monster, an unidentified beaked rodent-like creature whose corpse washed ashore on Long Island, New York in July 2008
