= Coulstone, Missouri =

Unincorporated community in Missouri, U.S.

Coulstone
- Unincorporated community
- Location within Missouri
- Coordinates: 37°31′22″N 91°45′05″W
- Country: United States
- State: Missouri
- County: Dent County
- Elevation: 1,112 ft (339 m)
- Time zone: UTC-6 (Central (CST))
  - Summer (DST): UTC-5 (CDT)
- GNIS feature ID: 740770

Coulstone is an unincorporated community in western Dent County, in the U.S. state of Missouri.

The community is on Missouri Route 32 adjacent to the Dent-Texas county line. Licking is 5.5 miles (8.9 km) to the west and Salem is approximately 14 miles (23 km) to the northeast along Route 32. Pigeon Creek flows past the community.

== History ==
A post office called Coulstone was in operation between 1888 and 1945. The community has the name of W. R. E. Coulstone, a local storekeeper.
