= Stonehill =

Stonehill or Stone Hill may refer to:

== Places ==
=== United States ===
- Stone Hill, Missouri, an unincorporated community
- Stone Hill (Montana), a climbing area in northwestern Montana
- Stone Hill Historic District, Baltimore, Maryland

=== Elsewhere ===
- Stone Hill Rocks, a site of special scientific interest in West Sussex, England

== Schools ==
- Stonehill College, a private Roman Catholic college in Easton, Massachusetts, USA
- Stonehill High School, a former school in Birstall Leicestershire, England, closed in 2015 after opening of The Cedars Academy
- Stonehill International School, Bangalore, India
- Stone Hill Middle School, Loudoun County, Virginia, USA

== People with the surname ==
- Randy Stonehill (born 1952), American singer-songwriter
- Robert Stonehill, fictionalized portrayal of William Canfield in the 2010 film Extraordinary Measures

== Other uses ==
- Stonehill scandal, 1962 bribery scandal in the Philippines
- Stone Hill Winery, Hermann, Missouri, USA
- Stone Hill Center, part of the Clark Art Institute in Williamstown, Massachusetts, USA
