= Joy, Missouri =

Unincorporated community in Missouri, U.S.

Joy
- Unincorporated community
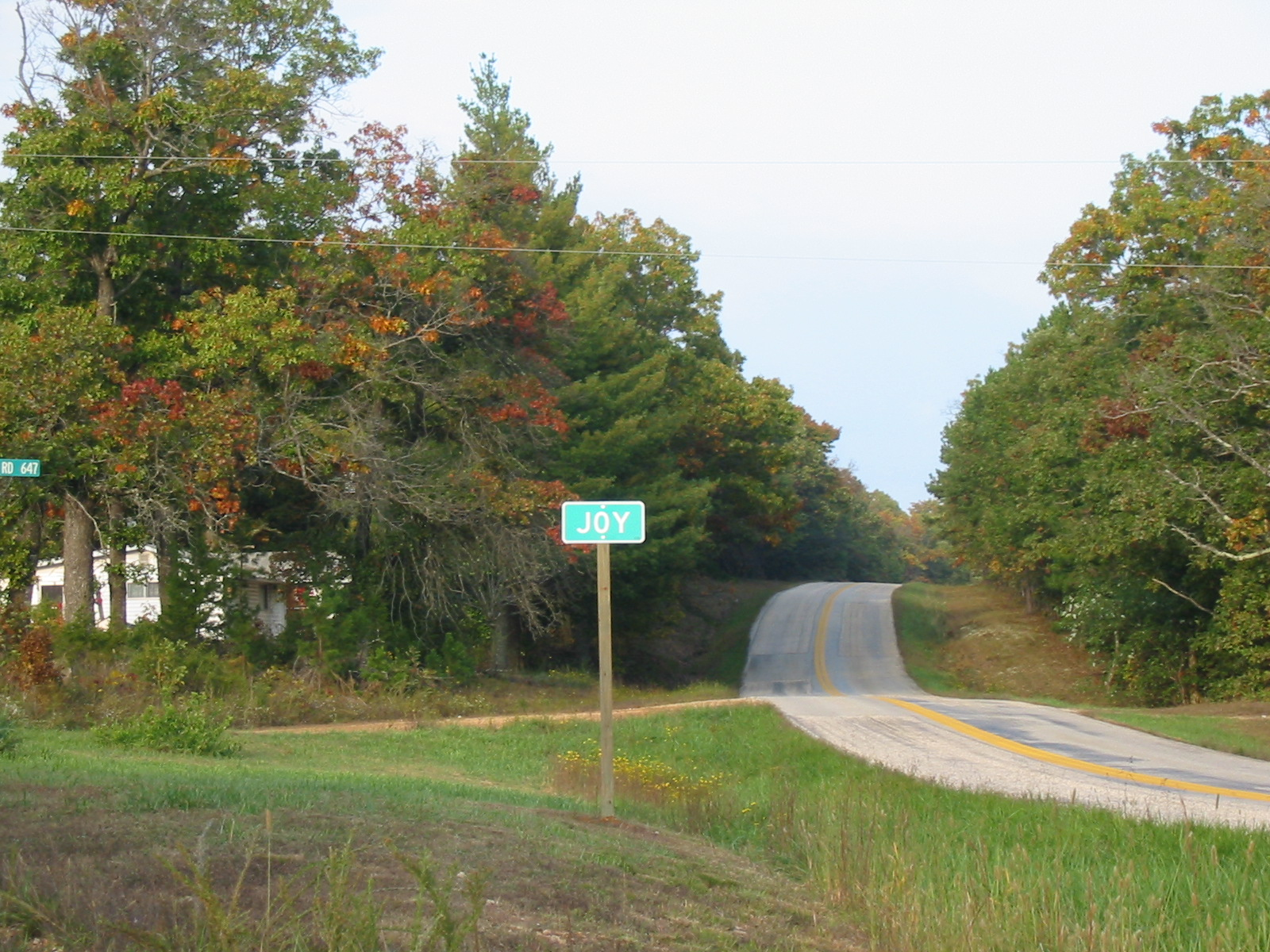
- Joy road marker in 2003. The sign was not present in 2017.

- Location within Missouri
- Coordinates: 37°30′52″N 91°40′28″W
- Country: United States
- State: Missouri
- County: Dent County
- Elevation: 1,299 ft (396 m)
- Time zone: UTC-6 (Central (CST))
  - Summer (DST): UTC-5 (CDT)
- GNIS feature ID: 740975

Joy is an unincorporated community in southwest Dent County, in the U.S. state of Missouri.

The community is located on Missouri Route E just east of Missouri Route 119. Salem is approximately eleven miles (18 km) to the northeast and Montauk State Park is about four miles (6.4 km) to the south. Licking in adjacent Texas County is about nine miles (14 km) to the southwest.

== History ==
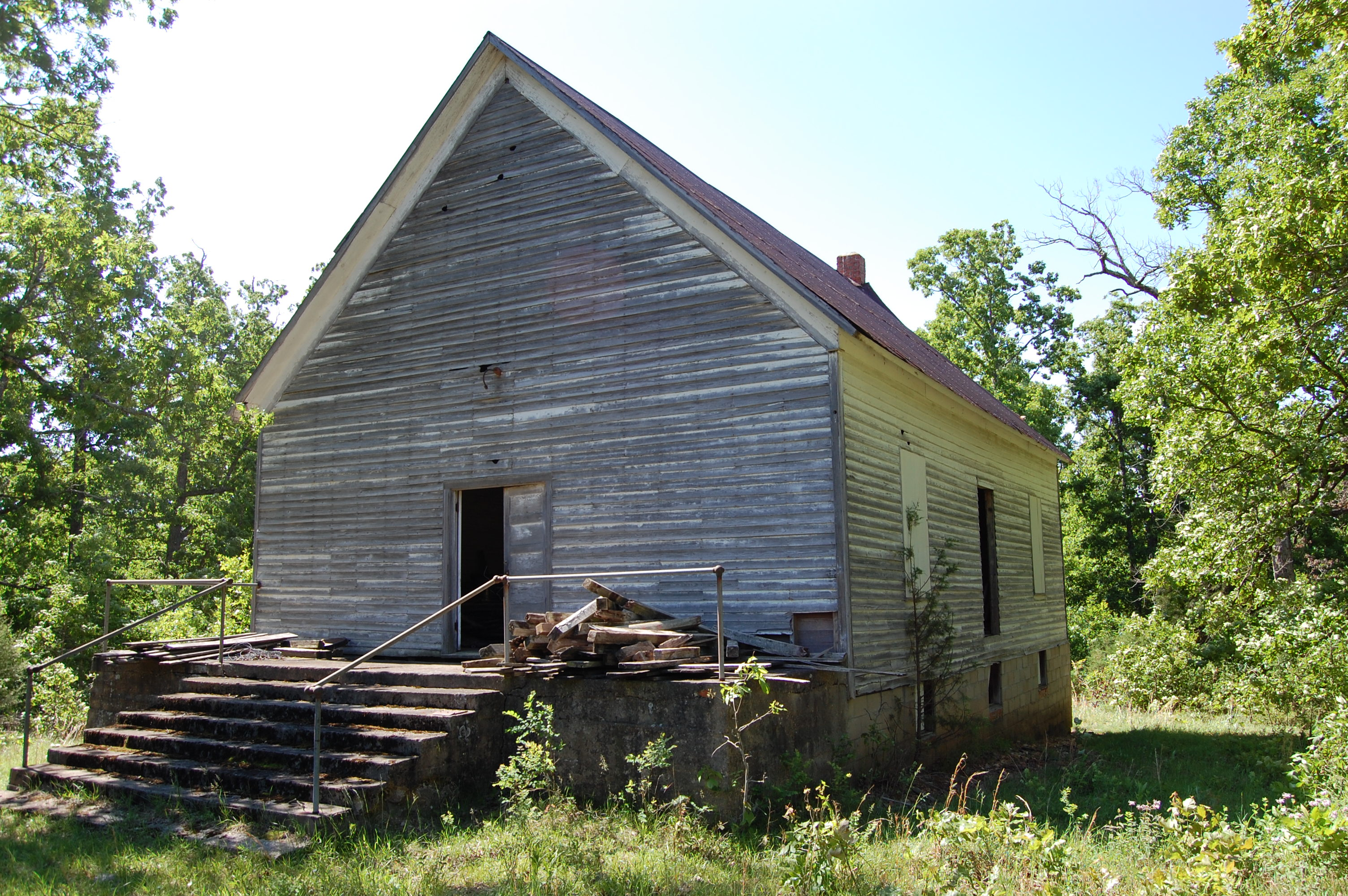
Joy Church in Joy, Missouri, May 2016

A post office called Joy was established in 1890, and remained in operation until 1954. The townspeople were overjoyed when they secured the post office, hence the name Joy.
