= Howes, Missouri =

Unincorporated community in Missouri, U.S.

Howes
- Unincorporated community
- Location within Missouri
- Coordinates: 37°42′34″N 91°30′53″W
- Country: United States
- State: Missouri
- County: Dent County
- Elevation: 735,659 ft (224,229 m)
- Time zone: UTC-6 (Central (CST))
  - Summer (DST): UTC-5 (CDT)
- GNIS feature ID: 735659

Howes is an unincorporated community in Dent County, in the U.S. state of Missouri. The community is on Missouri Route 19 approximately 4.5 miles (7.2 km) north of Salem.

== History ==
The community was named after the local Howe family. A variant name was Gano. An early postmaster named Gano gave his last name to the post office, in order to avoid repetition with nearby Howes Mill. A post office called Gano was established in 1902, and remained in operation until 1923.
