= Sligo (disambiguation) =

Sligo is a town in Ireland.

Sligo may also refer to:

== Ireland ==
- County Sligo, a county of Ireland

=== Parliamentary constituencies ===
- County Sligo (Parliament of Ireland constituency), before 1801
- Sligo (Parliament of Ireland constituency), before 1801
- County Sligo (UK Parliament constituency), 1801–1885
- Sligo (UK Parliament constituency), 1801–1870
- North Sligo, 1885–1922
- South Sligo, 1885–1922
- Sligo–Mayo East, 1922–1923
- Leitrim–Sligo, 1923–1937
- Sligo (Dáil constituency), 1937–1948
- Sligo–Leitrim, 1948–1969, 1969–2007, 2016–
- Sligo–North Leitrim, 2007–2016

== United States ==
- Sligo, Maryland, an area in Montgomery County

- Sligo Creek, a tributary of the Anacostia River in Maryland

- Sligo, Missouri, a village in Dent County
- Sligo, Ohio, an unincorporated community in Clinton County
- Sligo, Pennsylvania, a borough in Clarion County
- Sligo, Allegheny County, Pennsylvania, a ghost town in Harrison Township

== Other uses ==
- Sligo, a community in Caledon, Ontario

== See also ==
- Siligo, a municipality in Sardinia
