= Missouri Route 119 =

State highway in Missouri, U.S.

Route 119
- MO 119 highlighted in red

Route information
- Maintained by MoDOT
- Length: 10.191 mi (16.401 km)

Major junctions
- South end: Montauk State Park
- North end: Route 32 in Salem

Location
- Country: United States
- State: Missouri

Highway system
- Missouri State Highway System; Interstate; US; State; Supplemental
← Route 118	→ Route 120

Route 119 is a highway in Dent County. Its northern terminus is at Route 32 southwest of Salem; its southern terminus is at Montauk State Park. There are no towns on the highway.

== Major intersections ==
The entire route is in Dent County.

Location	mi	km	Destinations	Notes
Current Township	0.000	0.000	Montauk State Park entrance	
Texas Township	10.191	16.401	Route 32 – Licking, Salem	
1.000 mi = 1.609 km; 1.000 km = 0.621 mi
