= Jadwin, Missouri =

Unincorporated community in Missouri, U.S.

Jadwin
- Unincorporated community
- Location within Missouri
- Coordinates: 37°29′12″N 91°34′16″W
- Country: United States
- State: Missouri
- County: Dent County
- Elevation: 1,299 ft (396 m)
- Time zone: UTC-6 (Central (CST))
  - Summer (DST): UTC-5 (CDT)
- GNIS feature ID: 720228

Jadwin is an unincorporated community in southern Dent County, Missouri, United States. It is located at the intersection of Missouri routes K and BB approximately eleven miles (18 km) south of Salem and six miles (9.7 km) east of Montauk State Park.

A post office called Jadwin has been in operation since 1875. The community has the name of J. A. Jadwin, an early settler.
