= Crooked Creek (Meramec River tributary) =

Stream in the U.S. state of Missouri

Crooked Creek is a stream in Crawford and Dent counties in the U.S. state of Missouri. It is a tributary of the Meramec River.

The stream headwaters arise in eastern Dent County just north of County Route 404 and 11.5 miles east-northeast of Salem at 37°41′15″N 91°18′08″W and elevation 1290 ft. The stream flows generally northwest crossing under Missouri Route TT just east of Sligo and enters Crawford County. The stream crosses under Missouri Route 19 4.5 miles southwest of Cherryville. The stream continues to the northwest flowing past Keysville and under Missouri Route M to its confluence with the Meramec 1.5 miles north of Wesco at 37°52′59″N 91°26′21″W at an elevation of 833 feet.

Crooked Creek was so named on account of its meandering course.

== See also ==
- List of rivers of Missouri
