= Stone Hill, Missouri =

Unincorporated community in Missouri, U.S.

Stone Hill
- Unincorporated community
- Location within Missouri
- Coordinates: 37°36′06″N 91°20′31″W
- Country: United States
- State: Missouri
- County: Dent County
- Time zone: UTC-6 (Central (CST))
  - Summer (DST): UTC-5 (CDT)

Stone Hill is an unincorporated community in eastern Dent County, Missouri.

The community is on a county road just east of Missouri Route 72, approximately ten miles (16 km) east-southeast of Salem. Stone Hill Branch flows past the south side of the community to its confluence with the Meramec River two point five miles (4.0 km) to the west. Howes Mill is two point five miles (4.0 km) to the east-northeast on Missouri Route 32.

== History ==
A post office called Stone Hill was established in 1876, and remained in operation until 1954. The community takes its name from a nearby river bluff of the same name.
