= Fawn, Missouri =

Unincorporated community in Missouri, U.S.

Fawn
- Unincorporated community
- Location within Missouri
- Coordinates: 37°32′38″N 91°28′35″W
- Country: United States
- State: Missouri
- County: Dent County
- Time zone: UTC-6 (Central (CST))
  - Summer (DST): UTC-5 (CDT)

Fawn is an unincorporated community in Dent County, in the U.S. state of Missouri.

== History ==
A post office called Fawn was established in 1894, and remained in operation until 1908. The area was originally a hunting ground for deer, hence the name Fawn.
