= Rhyse, Missouri =

Unincorporated community in Missouri, U.S.

Rhyse
- Unincorporated community
- Location within Missouri
- Coordinates: 37°34′09″N 91°41′11″W
- Country: United States
- State: Missouri
- County: Dent County
- Time zone: UTC-6 (Central (CST))
  - Summer (DST): UTC-5 (CDT)

Rhyse is an unincorporated community in Dent County, in the U.S. state of Missouri.

== History ==
A post office called Rhyse was established in 1920, and remained in operation until 1954. The community has the first name of Rhyse Jeffries, the grandson of a resident.
