= Hedrick, Missouri =

Hedrick
- Unincorporated community
- Location within Missouri
- Coordinates: 37°37′55″N 91°39′59″W
- Country: United States
- State: Missouri
- County: Dent County
- Time zone: UTC-6 (Central (CST))
  - Summer (DST): UTC-5 (CDT)

Hedrick is an unincorporated community in Dent County, in the U.S. state of Missouri.

== History ==
A post office called Hedrick was established in 1884 and remained in operation until 1907. The community takes its name from Cicero P. Hedrick, a local judge.
