= Cooksey, Missouri =

Unincorporated community in Missouri, US

Cooksey
- Unincorporated community
- Location within Missouri
- Coordinates: 37°45′07″N 91°27′29″W
- Country: United States
- State: Missouri
- County: Dent County
- Elevation: 1,001 ft (305 m)
- Time zone: UTC-6 (Central (CST))
  - Summer (DST): UTC-5 (CDT)
- GNIS feature ID: 735460

Cooksey is an unincorporated community in Dent County, in the U.S. state of Missouri.

== History ==
A post office called Cooksey was established in 1905, and remained in operation until 1912. The community has the name of F. E. Cooksey, an early settler.
