= Keysville, Missouri =

Unincorporated community in Missouri, U.S.

Coordinates: 37°52′31″N 91°23′21″W

Keysville is an unincorporated community in southwest Crawford County, in the U.S. state of Missouri. The community is located approximately six miles south of Steelville on Missouri Route AA and is on the banks of Crooked Creek.

== History ==
A post office called Keysville was established in 1873, and remained in operation until 1955. The community was named after Elijah Key, a pioneer citizen.
