= Short Bend, Missouri =

Unincorporated community in Missouri, U.S.

Short Bend
- Unincorporated community
- Location within Missouri
- Coordinates: 37°44′47″N 91°26′03″W
- Country: United States
- State: Missouri
- County: Dent County
- Time zone: UTC-6 (Central (CST))
  - Summer (DST): UTC-5 (CDT)

Short Bend is an unincorporated community in Dent County, in the U.S. state of Missouri.

== History ==
The Short Bend post office closed in 1913. The community was named for a nearby meander on the Meramec River.
