= Current Township, Dent County, Missouri =

Inactive township in the American state of Missouri

Coordinates: 37.4670282°N 91.6731479°W

Current Township is an inactive township in Dent County, in the U.S. state of Missouri.

Current Township was established in 1866, taking its name from the Current River.
