= Darien, Missouri =

Unincorporated community in Missouri, U.S.

Darien
- Unincorporated community
- Location within Missouri
- Coordinates: 37°31′12″N 91°35′33″W
- Country: United States
- State: Missouri
- County: Dent County
- Time zone: UTC-6 (Central (CST))
  - Summer (DST): UTC-5 (CDT)

Darien is an unincorporated community in Dent County, in the U.S. state of Missouri.

== History ==
A post office called Darien was established in 1888, and remained in operation until 1954. The community was named after a place mentioned in the last line of the John Keats sonnet "On First Looking into Chapman's Homer".
