= Anutt, Missouri =

Unincorporated community in Missouri, U.S.

Anutt
- Unincorporated community
- Location within Missouri
- Coordinates: 37°42′57″N 91°43′12″W
- Country: United States
- State: Missouri
- County: Dent County
- Elevation: 1,207 ft (368 m)
- Time zone: UTC-6 (Central (CST))
  - Summer (DST): UTC-5 (CDT)
- GNIS feature ID: 713351

Anutt (/ˈænʌt/ AN-ət) is an unincorporated community in western Dent County, in the U.S. state of Missouri.

The community is located along a ridge at the intersection of routes O and C approximately 15 miles (24 km) south of Rolla. The community of Lenox is 4.5 miles (7.2 km) to the south along Route C. Edgar Springs is seven miles (11 km) to the west in Phelps County and Salem is 12 miles (19 km) to the east.

== History ==
A post office called Anutt was established in 1890, and remained in operation until 1963. The community was named after Annet Lenox, a local educator.

In 1925, Anutt had 137 inhabitants.
