= Missouri Route 32 =

State highway in Missouri, U.S.

Route 32

Route information
- Maintained by MoDOT
- Length: 285 mi (459 km)
- Existed: 1922–present

Major junctions
- East end: End of state maintenance in Ste. Genevieve
- US 61 in Ste. Genevieve; I-55 in New Offenburg; US 67 in Farmington; Route 21 in Caledonia, Missouri; Route 19 / Route 72 in Salem; US 63 in Licking; Route 5 in Lebanon; I-44 in Lebanon; US 65 in Buffalo; Route 13 in Bolivar
- West end: US 54 in El Dorado Springs

Location
- Country: United States
- State: Missouri

Highway system
- Missouri State Highway System; Interstate; US; State; Supplemental
← Route 31	→ Route 33

Route 32 is a highway in Missouri. Its eastern terminus is at the Mississippi River near Ste. Genevieve; its western terminus is at U.S. Route 54 in El Dorado Springs. It is currently one of the longest highways in the state. Most of the highway east of Lebanon is hilly and curvy, passing through a large part of the Missouri Ozarks.

Route 32 is one of the original Missouri highways from 1922. It originally ran only from Licking to Flat River (now Park Hills). Other portions were defined as Route 66 (El Dorado Springs to Fair Play), Route 13 (Fair Play to Buffalo), and Route 68 (Farmington to Ste. Genevieve). Route 66 replaced Route 13 to Buffalo in 1925, but by 1927 it became part of US 54. Route 32 also absorbed Route 68 in 1926 or 1927. Route 64, which had been designated in 1922 between Collins and Preston (now US 54), was extended east to Lebanon in the early 1930s, and by 1935 it had swapped alignments with US 54, becoming the El Dorado Springs-Lebanon route that now mostly carries Route 32. Route 32 was extended west to Lebanon by 1946, and it was later extended west, leaving only the Louisburg-Lebanon section of Route 64, which has since been extended west.

== Route description ==
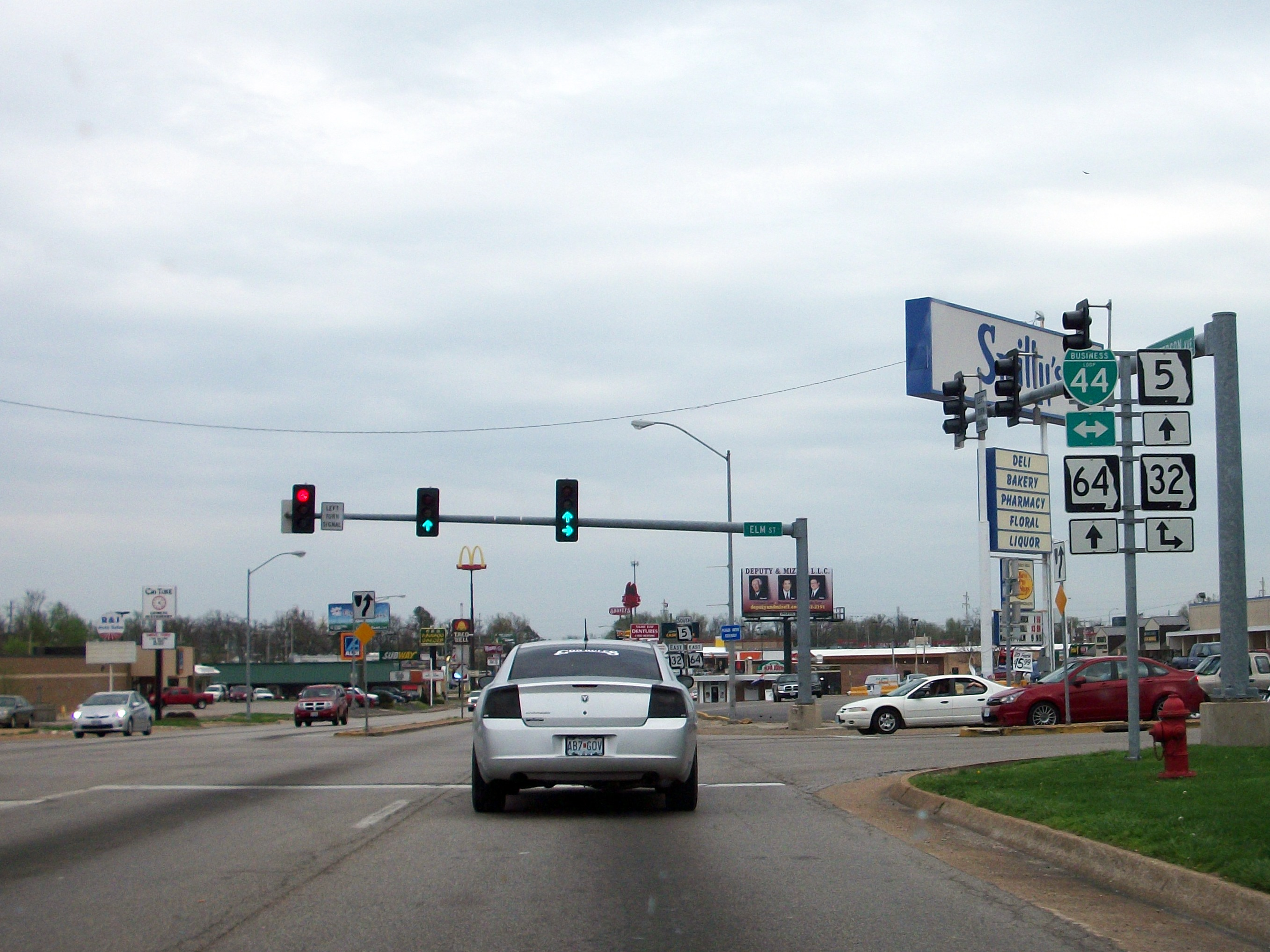
Route 32 leaves Interstate 44 Business and joins Route 5/Route 64 in Lebanon.

The highway begins at the beginning of state maintenance, at a point in the 300 block of 4th Street in Ste. Genevieve. City streets connect to a ferry providing passage across the Mississippi River to Illinois. Just before leaving the city, the route comes to an intersection with U.S. Route 61. Six miles further west is an interchange with Interstate 55 and eleven miles (18 km) west of the interstate is the northern junction of Route 144. At Farmington, the highway joins U.S. Route 67 for seven miles (11 km), then it exits at Leadington and turns into four lane to Saint Joe State Park U.S. Route 67 Business.

At Caledonia, the highway turns south and forms a four-mile (6 km) concurrency with Route 21, then turns west and enters the Mark Twain National Forest. In the national forest, the highway forms a six-mile (10 km) concurrency with Route 49. As the highway nears the western boundary of the Mark Twain National Forest, the highway joins Route 72, the two highways will be united to the west side of Salem. Nine miles west of Salem is the northern terminus of Route 119.

At Licking is the northern terminus of Route 137 and an intersection with U.S. Route 63. West of Licking, Route 32 enters another section of the Mark Twain National Forest. At Success, Route 32 turns north, joining Route 17 for four miles (6.4 km) then turns west again at Roby. At Lynchburg is the northern terminus of Route 95 and Route 32 turns north. Three miles northwest of Falcon, the highway leaves the Mark Twain National Forest.

At Lebanon, Route 32 joins Route 5 and has an interchange with Interstate 44, which also serves as the eastern terminus of Route 64. In Lebanon, the highway turns southwest and leaves the concurrency with Route 5 and Route 64.

At Buffalo, Route 32 intersects U.S. Route 65. The road then continues west, forming the main highway between the two county seats of Buffalo and Bolivar. At Bolivar, the highway intersect Route 83, and then intersects Route 13.

At Fair Play, Route 32 briefly joins Route 123 and begins a northwest route to the north side of Stockton Lake where the highway passes over the dam. At Stockton, it joins Route 39 briefly and continue west eventually reaching the northern terminus of Route 97. At this intersection, the highway turns due north for five miles (8.0 km) before reaching U.S. Route 54 and ending in eastern El Dorado Springs.

== History ==
The section of Route 32 between Route 17 and Plato was formerly designated as Route 17A.

== Major intersections ==
County	Location	mi	km	Destinations	Notes
Cedar	El Dorado Springs			US 54 – Nevada, Collins	
Cedar				Route 97 south – Jerico Springs	
Cedar				Route 39 north to US 54	west end of Route 39 overlap
Cedar	Stockton			Route 39 south – Greenfield	east end of Route 39 overlap
Cedar				Route 245 south – Bona	
Polk	Fair Play			Route 123 north – Dunnegan	west end of Route 123 overlap
Polk				Route 123 south – Aldrich	east end of Route 123 overlap
Polk	Bolivar			Route 13 – Humansville, Springfield	interchange; west end of Route 13 Bus. overlap
Polk	Bolivar			Route 83 north (North Main Avenue) to US 54	west end of Route 83 overlap
Polk	Bolivar			Route 83 south / Route 13 Bus. south (South Springfield Avenue)	east end of Route 83 overlap
Dallas	Buffalo			US 65 (Ash Street) – Louisburg, Preston, Fair Grove, Springfield	
Laclede	Lebanon			Historic US 66 west (Elm Street)	west end of I-44 Bus. / Historic US 66 overlap
Laclede	Lebanon			Historic US 66 east (Elm Street) / Route 5 north / Route 64 west (Jefferson Avenue) – Waynesville, Camdenton	east end of I-44 Bus. / Historic US 66 overlap; west end of Route 5 / Route 64 overlap
Laclede	Lebanon			I-44 – Rolla, St. Louis, Springfield	I-44 exit 129; east end of Route 64 overlap
Laclede	Lebanon			Route 5 south – Hartville	east end of Route 5 overlap
Laclede	Lynchburg			Route 95 south – Manes	
Texas	Roby			Route 17 north – Fort Leonard Wood, Waynesville	west end of Route 17 overlap
Texas	Success			Route 17 south – Houston	east end of Route 17 overlap
Texas	Licking			US 63 – Rolla, Houston	west end of Route 137 overlap
Texas	Licking			Route 137 south	east end of Route 137 overlap
Dent				Route 119 south – Montauk, Montauk State Park	
Dent	Salem			Route 72 west – Rolla	west end of Route 72 overlap
Dent	Salem			Route 19 (Main Street) – Steelville, Eminence, Downtown Salem	
Dent				Route 72 east – Bunker	east end of Route 72 overlap
Iron	Bixby			Route 49 north – Viburnum, Dillard Mill State Historic Site	west end of Route 49 overlap
Iron				Route 49 south	east end of Route 49 overlap
Iron				Route 21 south – Belleview	west end of Route 21 overlap
Washington	Caledonia			Route 21 north – Potosi	east end of Route 21 overlap
St. Francois				Route 32 Bus. east – Park Hills	
St. Francois				Route D south – Doe Run	
St. Francois				Route 32 Bus. west to US 67 Bus. – Park Hills	interchange
St. Francois	Leadington			US 67 Bus. north / Route O north (Woodlawn Drive) – Business District	west end of US 67 Bus. overlap
St. Francois	Leadington			US 67 north – College	interchange; east end of US 67 Bus. overlap; west end of US 67 overlap
St. Francois	Park Hills			Fairgrounds Drive - Park Hills, Leadington	interchange
St. Francois	Farmington			US 67 south – Fredericktown	interchange; east end of US 67 overlap
St. Francois	Farmington			Route OO west / Route W south to Route 21 – Fredericktown, Historic Downtown Farmington	
Ste. Genevieve	Millers			Route 144 east – Hawn State Park	
Ste. Genevieve				I-55 – St. Louis, Perryville	I-55 exit 150
Ste. Genevieve	Ste. Genevieve			US 61 – Bloomsdale, St. Mary	
Ste. Genevieve	Ste. Genevieve			South Fourth Street - Ferry Crossing	east end of state maintenance
1.000 mi = 1.609 km; 1.000 km = 0.621 mi
