= Missouri Route 72 =

State highway in Missouri, U.S.

Route 72

Route information
- Maintained by MoDOT
- Length: 165.675 mi (266.628 km)
- Existed: 1922–present

Major junctions
- West end: I-44 BL in Rolla
- US 63 in Rolla; US 67 in Fredericktown
- East end: I-55 BL / US 61 / Route 25 in Jackson

Location
- Country: United States
- State: Missouri

Highway system
- Missouri State Highway System; Interstate; US; State; Supplemental
← I-72	→ Route 73

Route 72 is a highway in southern Missouri. Its eastern terminus is at Route 34 west of Jackson; its western terminus is at I-44 in Rolla.

Route 72 is one of the original 1922 state highways. Its eastern terminus was at Centerville, and its western terminus was at the junction with Route 32. The part between Arcadia and Fredericktown was Route 70 from 1922 to 1959, when it became part of Route 72 because of I-70. Route 72 was rebuilt a few years back from Elk Prairie, just south of Rolla; to the intersection of Hwy 32, west of Salem. The road was widened and shoulders were built.

== Route description ==
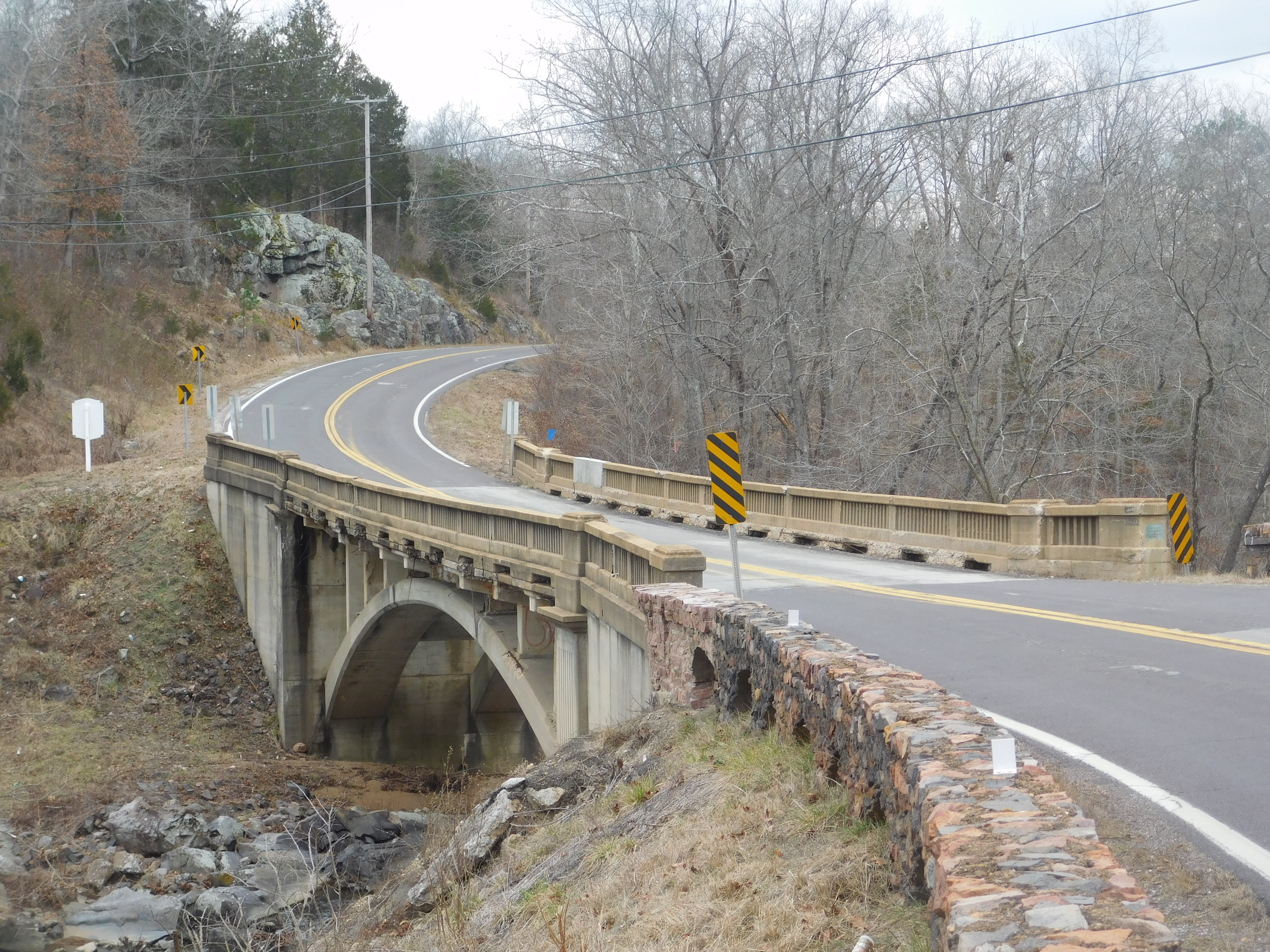
Route 72 crossing Stouts Creek in Arcadia Valley

As Route 72 passes through Salem, it crosses Route 19; then runs concurrently eastward for 10 miles with Route 32. It then splits off to the southeast towards the small town of Bunker. It is very curvy; it passes back and forth between Dent and Reynolds county several times. After passing through Bunker, it runs mostly eastward for 17 miles; before intersecting Hwy 21; 3 miles south of Centerville. 72 then turns left (north) and runs concurrently with Hwy 21 through Centerville. Between Centerville and Lesterville, Route 49 joins it and 21, 72 and 49 run concurrently eastward to the Glover corner. Route 49 turns right (south) at that corner; while Route 72 and 21 turn left (north). Route 72 and Route 21 run north for 10 miles to Arcadia; at the south edge of Ironton; Route 21 continues north while Route 72 turns east. However, it has a unique interchange; it crosses under Hwy 72 east on 21/72, then turns left (west)for one block, then turns left(southeast) and goes back up over 21/72. Route 72 then runs east, intersects US Hwy 67 west of Fredericktown. It then proceeds to its eastern terminus with Route 34 at Jackson, MO.

== Major intersections ==
County	Location	mi	km	Destinations	Notes
Phelps	Rolla	0.000	0.000	I-44 BL / Historic US 66 (Kingshighway) – Business District	
Phelps	Rolla	0.623	1.003	US 63 – Edgar Springs, Jefferson City	
Dent	Salem	26.327	42.369	Route 32 west – Licking	Western end of Route 32 overlap
Dent	Salem	27.848	44.817	Route 19 / Route 68 west (Main Street) – Steelville, Eminence, Downtown Salem	
Dent		40.077	64.498	Route 32 east – Howes Mill	Eastern end of Route 32 overlap
Reynolds	No major junctions				
Dent	No major junctions				
Reynolds	No major junctions				
Dent	No major junctions				
Reynolds		73.858	118.863	Route 21 south / Route V – Ellington	Western end of Route 21 overlap
Reynolds		81.796	131.638	Route 49 north – Black, Oates	Western end of Route 49 overlap
Iron		95.021	152.921	Route 49 south – Annapolis	Eastern end of Route 49 overlap
Iron	Arcadia	104.736	168.556	Route 21 north – Potosi	Eastern end of Route 21 overlap
Madison	Fredericktown	122.898	197.785	US 67 – Farmington, Poplar Bluff US 67 Bus. begins	Interchange
Madison	Fredericktown	123.315	198.456	US 67 Bus. south (W. Main Street) – Business District	Roundabout
Madison	Junction City–Fredericktown line	125.823	202.492	Lincoln Drive – Fredericktown, Business District	Former Route 72 west
Bollinger	Patton Junction	142.749	229.732	Route 51 – Perryville, Patton	
Cape Girardeau		162.185	261.011	Route 34 west – Marble Hill, Bollinger Mill Historic Site	
Cape Girardeau	Jackson	165.675	266.628	I-55 BL / US 61 / Great River Road / Route 25 south – Cape Girardeau, Fruitland, Dutchtown	
1.000 mi = 1.609 km; 1.000 km = 0.621 mi
