= Bangert, Missouri =

Unincorporated community in Missouri, U.S.

Coordinates: 37°46′16″N 91°30′58″W

Bangert is an unincorporated community in Dent County, in the U.S. state of Missouri.

== History ==
An early variant name was Avery. A post office called Avery was in operation from 1880 until 1886, the name was changed to Bangert in 1902, and the post office closed in 1951. Avery was the name of C. A. Avery, an early postmaster, and Bangert was the name of a railroad official.
