= Pigeon Creek (Current River tributary) =

Stream in the U.S. state of Missouri

Pigeon Creek is a stream in Texas and Dent counties of southern Missouri. It is a tributary of the Current River.

The stream headwaters arise in Texas County adjacent to Missouri Route C approximately three miles northeast of Licking at 37°31′38″N 91°49′42″W and an elevation of approximately 1300 feet. It flows generally east to southeast to its confluence with the Current at Montauk Spring in Montauk State Park at 37°27′36″N 91°41′00″W at an elevation of 935 feet.

The stream was named for the common occurrence of pigeons along the stream.
