= Mounce, Missouri =

Unincorporated community in Missouri, U.S.

Mounce
- Unincorporated community
- Location within Missouri
- Coordinates: 37°39′58″N 91°23′14″W
- Country: United States
- State: Missouri
- County: Dent County
- Time zone: UTC-6 (Central (CST))
  - Summer (DST): UTC-5 (CDT)

Mounce is an unincorporated community in Dent County, in the U.S. state of Missouri.

== History ==
A post office called Mounce was established in 1892, and remained in operation until 1913. The community has the name of Prince E. Mounce, an early citizen.
