= Hobson, Missouri =

Unincorporated community in Missouri, U.S.

Hobson
- Unincorporated community
- Location within Missouri
- Coordinates: 37°45′20″N 91°37′56″W
- Country: United States
- State: Missouri
- County: Dent County
- Time zone: UTC-6 (Central (CST))
  - Summer (DST): UTC-5 (CDT)

Hobson is an unincorporated community in Dent County, in the U.S. state of Missouri.

== History ==
A post office called Hobson was established in 1893, and remained in operation until 1954. The community has the name of T. E. Hobson, the proprietor of a local mill.
