= Montauk, Missouri =

Unincorporated community in Missouri, U.S.

Montauk
- Unincorporated community
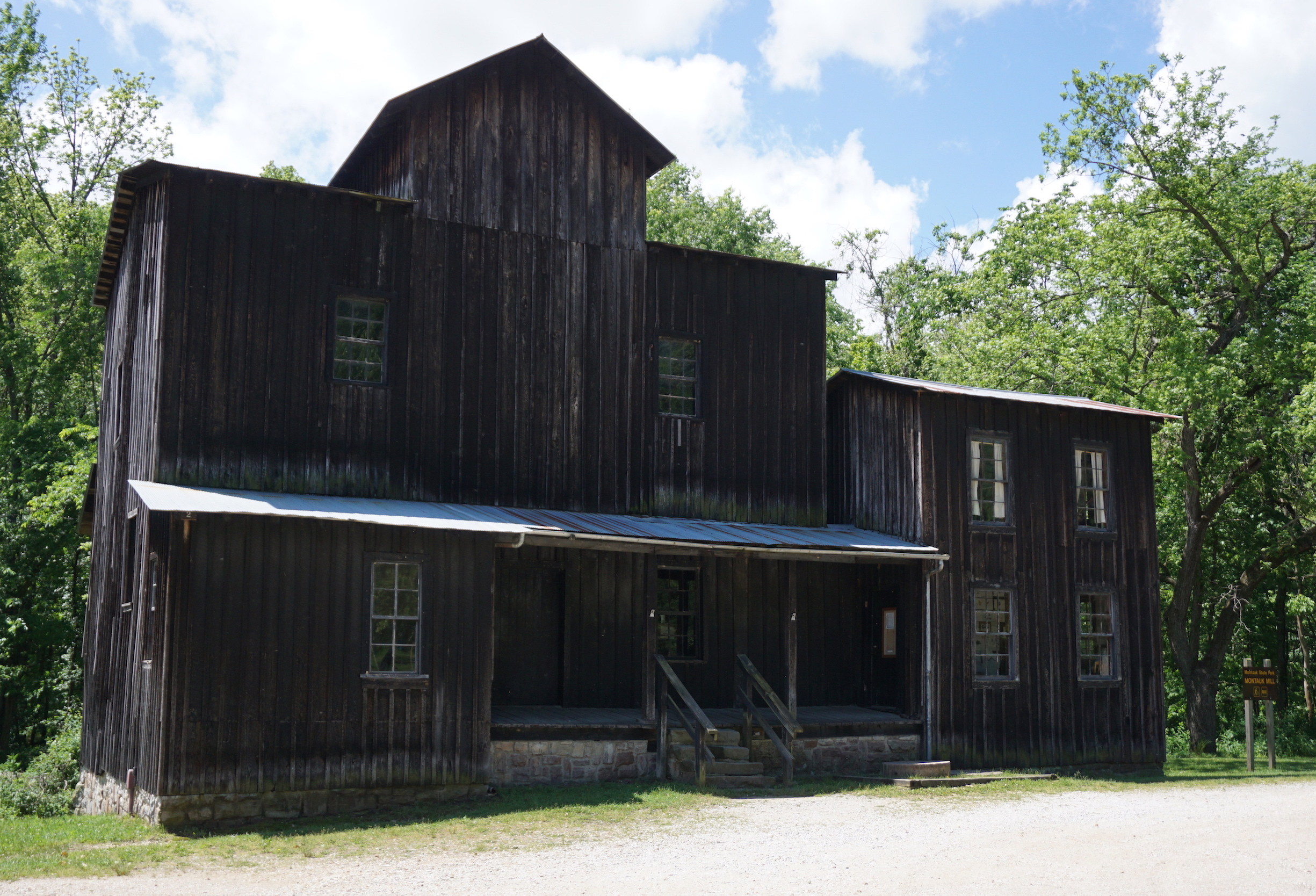
- Old Mill at Montauk State Park

- Location within Missouri
- Coordinates: 37°26′52″N 91°41′45″W
- Country: United States
- State: Missouri
- County: Dent County
- Time zone: UTC-6 (Central (CST))
  - Summer (DST): UTC-5 (CDT)

Montauk (/mɒnˈtɔːk/ mon-TAWK) is an unincorporated community in southwestern Dent County, Missouri, United States. It is located on Route 119, on the Current River and is in the Ozark National Scenic Riverways. Montauk State Park, famed for its rainbow and brown trout, is here.

A post office called Montauk was in operation from 1851 to 1974. The community was named after the Montaukett Indians.
