= Lecoma, Missouri =

Unincorporated community in Missouri, U.S.

Lecoma
- Unincorporated community
- Location within Missouri
- Coordinates: 37°46′34″N 91°43′52″W
- Country: United States
- State: Missouri
- County: Dent County
- Time zone: UTC-6 (Central (CST))
  - Summer (DST): UTC-5 (CDT)

Lecoma is an unincorporated community in northwestern Dent County, Missouri, United States. It is located approximately twelve miles south of Rolla.

A post office called Lecoma was established in 1883, and remained in operation until 1990. The community's name is an amalgamation of the surnames of local merchants Lenox, Comstock, and Martin.
