= Jack, Missouri =

Unincorporated community in Missouri, U.S.

Jack
- Unincorporated community
- Location within Missouri
- Coordinates: 37°34′34″N 91°37′17″W
- Country: United States
- State: Missouri
- County: Dent County
- Elevation: 1,332 ft (406 m)
- Time zone: UTC-6 (Central (CST))
  - Summer (DST): UTC-5 (CDT)
- GNIS feature ID: 735668

Jack is an unincorporated community in Dent County, in the U.S. state of Missouri.

== History ==
A post office called Jack was established in 1905, and remained in operation until 1954. An early postmaster gave the community the first name of his son, Jack Jadwin.
