= Condray, Missouri =

Unincorporated community in Missouri, U.S.

Condray
- Unincorporated community
- Location within Missouri
- Coordinates: 37°46′00″N 91°33′18″W
- Country: United States
- State: Missouri
- County: Dent County
- Elevation: 1,109 ft (338 m)
- Time zone: UTC-6 (Central (CST))
  - Summer (DST): UTC-5 (CDT)
- GNIS feature ID: 759631

Condray is an unincorporated community in Dent County, in the U.S. state of Missouri.

== History ==
A post office called Condray was established in 1886, and remained in operation until 1910. The community has the name of Thomas H. Condray, an officer at a nearby blast furnace.
