= Ranger, Missouri =

Unincorporated community in Missouri, U.S.

Ranger
- Unincorporated community
- Location within Missouri
- Coordinates: 37°33′30″N 91°43′54″W
- Country: United States
- State: Missouri
- County: Dent County
- Time zone: UTC-6 (Central (CST))
  - Summer (DST): UTC-5 (CDT)

Ranger is an unincorporated community in Dent County, in the U.S. state of Missouri.

== History ==
A post office called Ranger was established in 1896, and remained in operation until 1917. The origin of the name Ranger is obscure.
