= Rector, Missouri =

Extinxt town in the American state of Missouri

Coordinates: 37°24′25″N 91°30′35″W

Rector is an extinct town in northwest Shannon County, in the U.S. state of Missouri. The GNIS classifies it as a populated place. The community is located in Rector Hollow, which is a tributary to Gladden Creek approximately one mile to the west. It is on Missouri Route J two miles west of Missouri Route 19.

A post office called Rector was established in 1894, and remained in operation until 1954. The community has the name of the local Rector family.
