= Texas Township, Dent County, Missouri =

Township in Dent County, Missouri, USA

Coordinates: 37.56°N 91.67°W

Texas Township is an inactive township in Dent County, in the U.S. state of Missouri.

Texas Township was erected in 1866, taking its name from nearby Texas County, Missouri.
