= Ashley Creek (Current River tributary) =

Stream in Missouri, U.S.

Coordinates: 37°25′41″N 91°38′59″W

Ashley Creek is a stream in Dent and Texas counties in the Ozarks of southern Missouri. It is a tributary to the Current River.

The creek is formed by the joining of North Ashley Creek and South Ashley Creek. The junction of the two tributaries is at and the confluence with the Current River is at .

The stream system has the name of William Henry Ashley, a frontiersman.

== See also ==
- List of rivers of Missouri
