= Ashley Creek (Flathead River tributary) =

Stream in Montana, U.S.

Coordinates: 48°09′32″N 114°12′45″W

Ashley Creek is a stream in the U.S. state of Montana. It is a tributary to the Flathead River.

Ashley Creek was named after an early settler.
