= Louisburg, Missouri =

Louisburg
- Village
- Location of Louisburg, Missouri
- Coordinates: 37°45′23″N 93°08′28″W
- Country: United States
- State: Missouri
- County: Dallas

Area
  - Total: 0.46 sq mi (1.20 km^{2})
  - Land: 0.46 sq mi (1.20 km^{2})
  - Water: 0 sq mi (0.00 km^{2})
- Elevation: 1,158 ft (353 m)

Population (2020)
  - Total: 134
  - Density: 288/sq mi (111.3/km^{2})
- Time zone: UTC-6 (Central (CST))
  - Summer (DST): UTC-5 (CDT)
- ZIP code: 65685
- Area code: 417
- FIPS code: 29-44156
- GNIS feature ID: 2399191

Louisburg is a village in Dallas County, Missouri, United States. As of the 2020 census, Louisburg had a population of 134. It is part of the Springfield, Missouri Metropolitan Statistical Area.

== History ==
An early variant name was Round Prairie. A post office called Round Prairie was established in 1847, and the name was changed to Louisburg in 1858. The present name is after Louis Hart, a pioneer citizen.

== Geography ==
According to the United States Census Bureau, the village has a total area of 0.47 square miles (1.22 km^{2}), all land.

== Demographics ==
Historical population
Census	Pop.	Note	%±
1880	34		—
1970	152		—
1980	140		−7.9%
1990	115		−17.9%
2000	147		27.8%
2010	122		−17.0%
2020	134		9.8%
U.S. Decennial Census

=== 2010 census ===
As of the census of 2010, there were 122 people, 57 households, and 32 families living in the village. The population density was 259.6 inhabitants per square mile (100.2/km^{2}). There were 79 housing units at an average density of 168.1 per square mile (64.9/km^{2}). The racial makeup of the village was 94.3% White, 0.8% Native American, and 4.9% from two or more races. Hispanic or Latino of any race were 0.8% of the population.

There were 57 households, of which 24.6% had children under the age of 18 living with them, 40.4% were married couples living together, 10.5% had a female householder with no husband present, 5.3% had a male householder with no wife present, and 43.9% were non-families. 36.8% of all households were made up of individuals, and 17.6% had someone living alone who was 65 years of age or older. The average household size was 2.14 and the average family size was 2.81.

The median age in the village was 44 years. 21.3% of residents were under the age of 18; 7.4% were between the ages of 18 and 24; 23% were from 25 to 44; 25.4% were from 45 to 64; and 23% were 65 years of age or older. The gender makeup of the village was 48.4% male and 51.6% female.

=== 2000 census ===
As of the census of 2000, there were 147 people, 56 households, and 44 families living in the village. The population density was 318.4 inhabitants per square mile (122.9/km^{2}). There were 67 housing units at an average density of 145.1 per square mile (56.0/km^{2}). The racial makeup of the village was 100.00% White.

There were 56 households, out of which 37.5% had children under the age of 18 living with them, 66.1% were married couples living together, 10.7% had a female householder with no husband present, and 21.4% were non-families. 17.9% of all households were made up of individuals, and 8.9% had someone living alone who was 65 years of age or older. The average household size was 2.63 and the average family size was 3.00.

In the village, the population was spread out, with 30.6% under the age of 18, 7.5% from 18 to 24, 27.9% from 25 to 44, 16.3% from 45 to 64, and 17.7% who were 65 years of age or older. The median age was 34 years. For every 100 females, there were 90.9 males. For every 100 females age 18 and over, there were 82.1 males.

The median income for a household in the village was $28,438, and the median income for a family was $30,000. Males had a median income of $20,625 versus $20,833 for females. The per capita income for the village was $11,952. There were 16.7% of families and 20.3% of the population living below the poverty line, including 37.5% of under eighteens and none of those over 64.
