= Stone Hill (Montana) =

Outdoor recreation area

Highest point
- Elevation: 2,919 feet (889.7 m)
- Coordinates: 48.79306°N 115.29974°W

Stone Hill is an extensively developed climbing area in Northwestern Montana, approximately 15 miles (24 km) from Eureka, Montana and just off Lake Koocanusa.

Much of the development in the area, just under half the total routes, can be attributed to the efforts of Steve Stahl, who, during the years of 2000-2003 established over 260 lines.

The rock is an extremely hard quartzite derivative, and is characterized by painfully sharp edges, vanishing cracks, steep slabs and small horizontal roofs. The cracks tend to be very protectable, and as a result over half the routes in the area are protected by a combination of bolts and traditional means.
