= Gladden, Missouri =

Unincorporated community in Missouri, U.S.

Gladden
- Unincorporated community
- Location within Missouri
- Coordinates: 37°29′55″N 91°27′24″W
- Country: United States
- State: Missouri
- County: Dent County
- Time zone: UTC-6 (Central (CST))
  - Summer (DST): UTC-5 (CDT)

Gladden is an unincorporated community in Dent County, Missouri, United States. It is located approximately ten miles (16 km) south of Salem on Route 19.

A post office called Gladden was established in 1885, and remained in operation until 1972. The community most likely was named after the local Gladden family.
