= Sligo, Missouri =

Unincorporated community in Missouri, U.S.

- Community
- Location of Sligo, Missouri Sligo, Missouri (the United States)
- Coordinates: 37°46′26″N 91°22′40″W
- Country: U. S. A.
- State: Missouri
- County: Dent County
- Elevation: 324 m (1,063 ft)
- Time zone: UTC-6 (CST)
  - Summer (DST): UTC-5 (CDT)

Sligo (/ˈslaɪɡoʊ/ SLY-goh) is an unincorporated community, founded in 1886 in northeastern Dent County, Missouri, United States. It is located just off Route 19 on Missouri Route TT, approximately 16 miles (26 km) northeast of Salem on the Crooked Creek tributary to the Meramec River. The Indian Trail Conservation Area lies south of the town.

== History ==
=== Early history ===
The building of the iron ore blast furnace by the Sligo Furnace Company brought many needed jobs to the residents of Dent County and the surrounding counties when it opened in 1880. A town was soon formed at the furnace site and was named Sligo after the parent company.

=== Population boom and company town life ===
Many workers flocked to Sligo in search of jobs, and as the population increased, the company began to build homes for the workers which they rented for $1 or $2 per month, depending on the size of the house. They also built a store, barber shop, Post Office and schoolhouse. The population grew to over 1,000 people in the early days, and at the height of the furnace operation over 3,000 people worked in the Sligo community.

Whenever early residents weren't hunting and fishing for food that didn't have to be purchased at the company store, they could be found enjoying themselves at local dances. For several years after the opening of the Sligo Furnace, the residents of Sligo were without a church or church leader. The Sligo Furnace Company Superintendent was the supreme law—saloons and gambling halls were forbidden by the company, and any man found in trouble lost his job.

Sligo had lawlessness like any other company town, however. Rowdiness and drunkenness amongst the younger male residents was not uncommon when workers were off the clock. Illegal moonshine could be obtained from "Money Cave" at Mint Spring located on the upper Meramec River or legal liquor could be shipped in from nearby Salem. Poker and dice games were also prevalent in early Sligo.

=== Later history and churches ===
It wasn't long before a group of people from Sligo, Fishwater and Daniels met and encouraged Sligo to form its own church. They did and began holding services in the Sligo schoolhouse (still used as of 2011, the Sligo schoolhouse was converted to the "Community Building" where local meetings and celebrations are held). This church functioned with different denominations and various speakers.

In 1898 St. Louisan James G. McRoberts was appointed Superintendent of the Sligo Furnace Company and relocated his family to Sligo. His wife Sophie, an ardent Methodist, was reluctant to make the move unless there was some type of Christian organization available.

The Sligo Methodist Church was organized March 8, 1903, by Rev. A. P. George, the St. Louis Union Sunday School Secretary, with five charter members: Mrs. Sophie McRoberts, Mrs. Meta Allen, Mrs. Robert Erwin, Mrs. Catherine Irwin, and Mrs. Lottie Snelson, and one probationer, William Snelson. The trustees were Mr. James McRoberts, Mr. Robert Erwin, and Mr. Glenn Allen; the Sunday School Superintendent was Mrs. Sophie McRoberts.

The church building, where Sligo United Methodist Church still holds Sunday services at 9 am, was mostly built by the Sligo Furnace Company which also paid half of the pastor's salary until it closed in 1921. Services were held in the school building until the church was finished.
