= Doss, Missouri =

Unincorporated community in Missouri, U.S.

Doss
- Unincorporated community
- Location within Missouri
- Coordinates: 37°34′34″N 91°29′06″W
- Country: United States
- State: Missouri
- County: Dent County
- Time zone: UTC-6 (Central (CST))
  - Summer (DST): UTC-5 (CDT)

Doss is a small unincorporated community in Dent County, Missouri, United States. It is located approximately five miles (8.0 km) south of Salem.

A post office called Doss was in operation from 1888 to 1966. The community has the name of William Doss, a local newspaper publisher.
