= Howes Mill, Missouri =

Unincorporated community in Missouri, U.S.

Howes Mill
- Unincorporated community
- Location within Missouri
- Coordinates: 37°37′04″N 91°17′30″W
- Country: United States
- State: Missouri
- County: Dent County
- Elevation: 1,378 ft (420 m)
- Time zone: UTC-6 (Central (CST))
  - Summer (DST): UTC-5 (CDT)
- GNIS feature ID: 758436

Howes Mill is an unincorporated community in eastern Dent County, in the U.S. state of Missouri.

The community is approximately 12.5 miles east of Salem on Missouri Route 32. The Howes Mill spring is two miles to the northeast on the West Fork of Huzzah Creek.

== History ==
A post office called Howes Mill was established in 1859, and remained in operation until 1957. The community was named after Tom Howe, the proprietor of a local mill.

== Notable person ==
- Carmen Berra (1925–2014), the wife of Yogi Berra, who was a dance instructor at an Arthur Murray Dance Studio and who worked as riveter for McDonnell Douglas in St. Louis during World War II was born and raised in Howe's Mill, Missouri.
