= Custer, Missouri =

Unincorporated community in Missouri, U.S.

Custer
- Unincorporated community
- Location within Missouri
- Coordinates: 37°32′11″N 91°31′11″W
- Country: United States
- State: Missouri
- County: Dent County
- Time zone: UTC-6 (Central (CST))
  - Summer (DST): UTC-5 (CDT)

Custer is an unincorporated community in Dent County, in the U.S. state of Missouri.

== History ==
A post office called Custer was established in 1882, and remained in operation until 1942. The community has the name of George Armstrong Custer, an American Civil War general and Indian fighter.
