= Montauk State Park =

State park in Missouri, United States

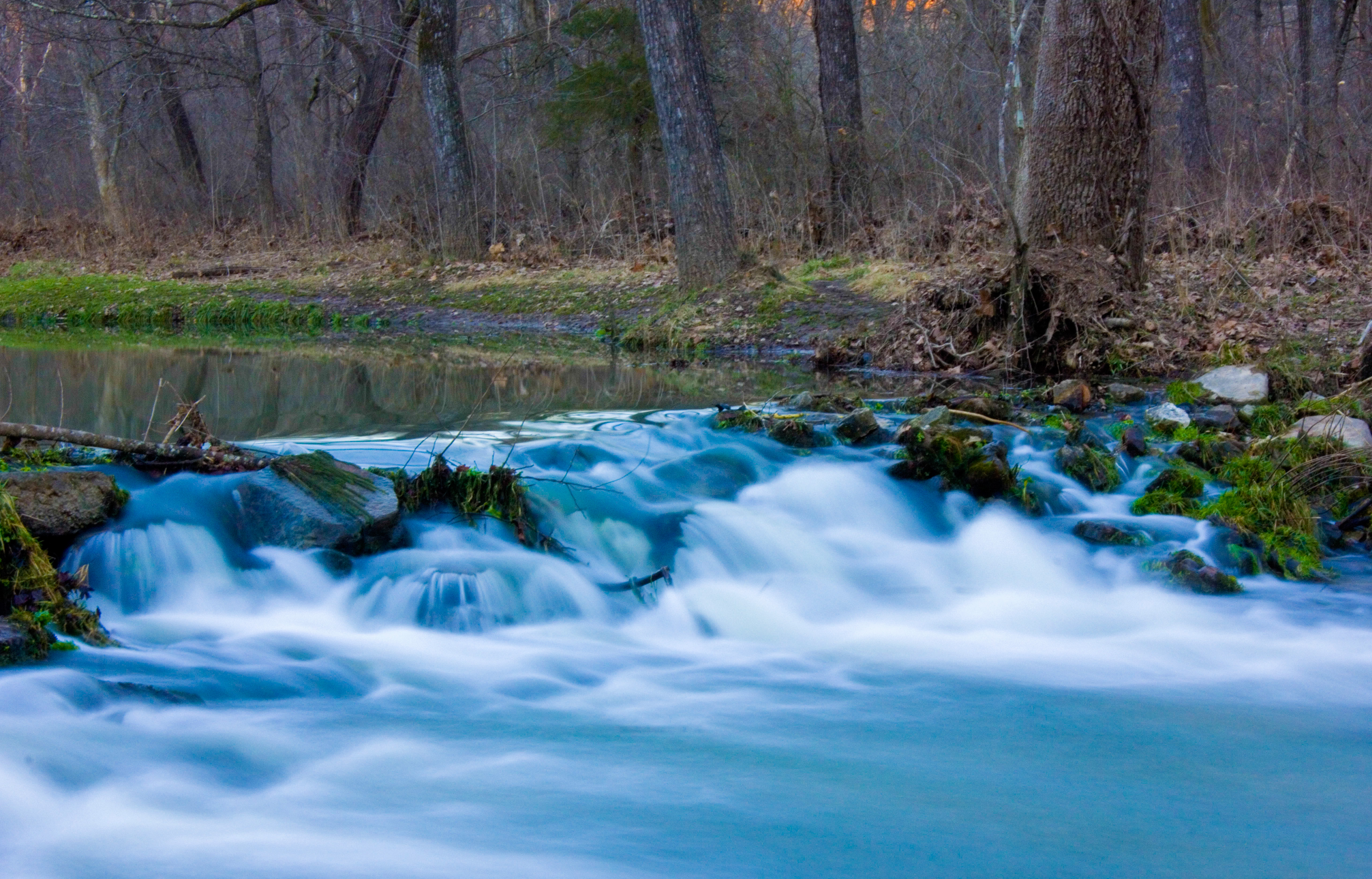
- Rapids in the Current River at Montauk State Park

- Location within Missouri Location within the United States
- Location: Dent County, Missouri, United States
- Nearest city: Salem, Missouri
- Coordinates: 37°27′37″N 91°40′59″W
- Area: 2,920.12 acres (1,181.73 ha)
- Elevation: 935 ft (285 m)
- Established: 1926
- Administrator: Missouri Department of Natural Resources
- Visitors: 580,715 (in 2023)
- Website: Official website
- Dam and Spillway in the Hatchery Area at Montauk State Park
- U.S. National Register of Historic Places
- Nearest city: Salem, Missouri
- Area: less than one acre
- Built: 1935
- Built by: CCC; NPS
- MPS: ECW Architecture in Missouri State Parks 1933-1942 TR
- NRHP reference No.: 85000528
- Added to NRHP: February 26, 1985
- Montauk State Park Open Shelter
- U.S. National Register of Historic Places
- Nearest city: Salem, Missouri
- Area: less than one acre
- Built: 1934
- Built by: CCC; NPS
- Architectural style: Rustic
- MPS: ECW Architecture in Missouri State Parks 1933-1942 TR
- NRHP reference No.: 85000529
- Added to NRHP: February 28, 1985
- Old Mill at Montauk State Park
- U.S. National Register of Historic Places
- Nearest city: Salem, Missouri
- Area: less than one acre
- Built: 1896
- Built by: Furry, William J.
- MPS: ECW Architecture in Missouri State Parks 1933-1942 TR
- NRHP reference No.: 85001478
- Added to NRHP: June 27, 1985

Montauk State Park is a public recreation area occupying nearly 3,000 acres (1,200 ha) at the headwaters of the Current River, fifteen miles (24 km) southwest of Salem, Missouri. The state park contains a fish hatchery and is noted for its rainbow and brown trout angling. It was acquired in 1926. The park has several natural springs including Montauk Springs with a daily average flow of 53 million gallons of water.

== Historic sites ==
The park includes three resources that were listed on the National Register of Historic Places in 1985:

- Dam and Spillway in the Hatchery Area at Montauk State Park: The stone structure was built in 1935 by Company 1770 of the Civilian Conservation Corps as part of a trout hatchery development project.
- Montauk State Park Open Shelter: The rustic structure was built in 1934–1935 by Company 1770 of the Civilian Conservation Corps. It is an open rectangular structure with an open stone fireplace, low stone dividing walls, and two picnic areas. It features heavy wooden posts and curved struts.
- Old Mill at Montauk State Park: The grist mill was built in 1896 replacing an earlier mill built in 1870. It was rehabilitated in 1935 by Company 1770 of the Civilian Conservation Corps. It is a 2½-story frame building with a multi-gable roof and stone foundation. It features a central tower-like extension above the second story roof. The Montauk mill is available for tours. The mill ceased operations in 1927.

== Gallery ==
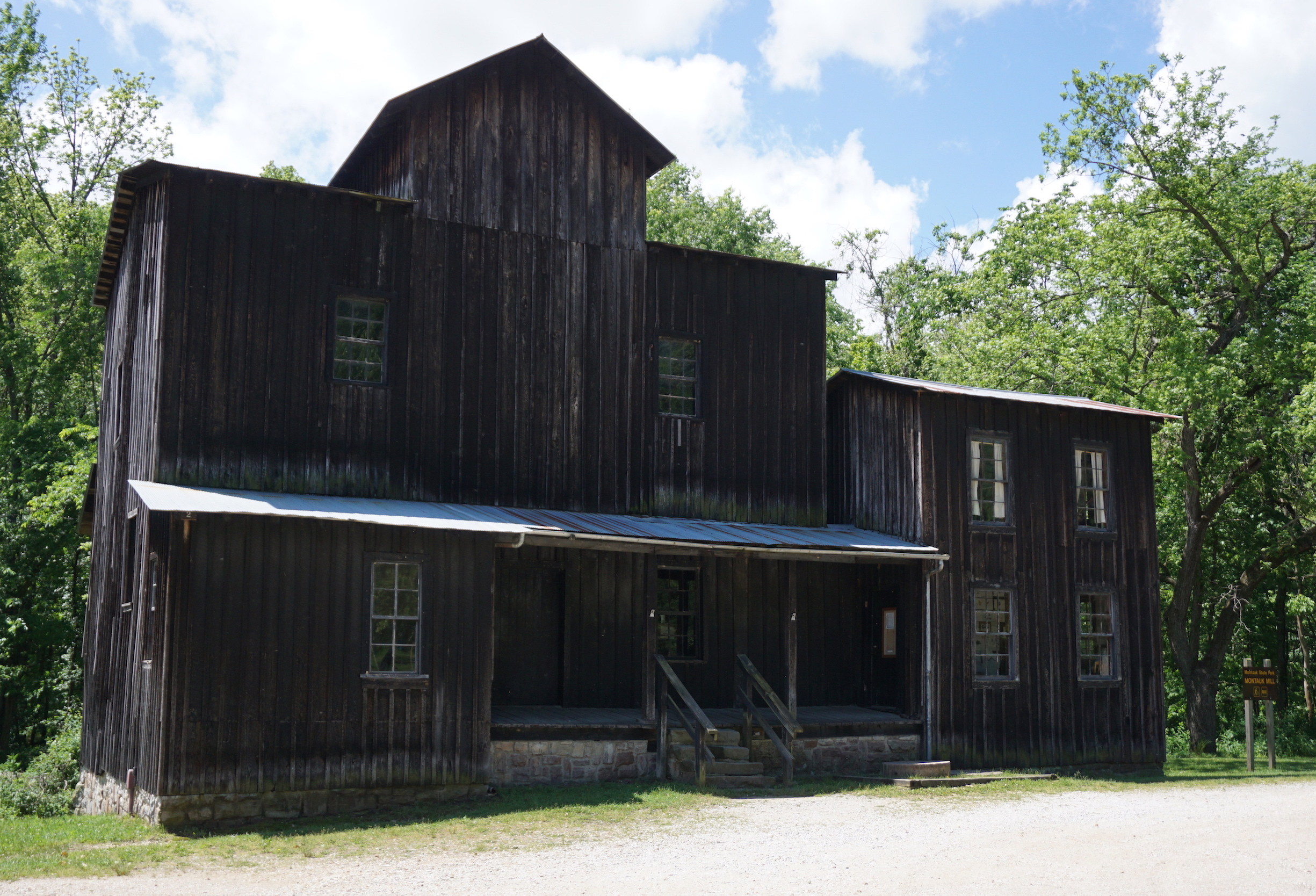
Old Mill

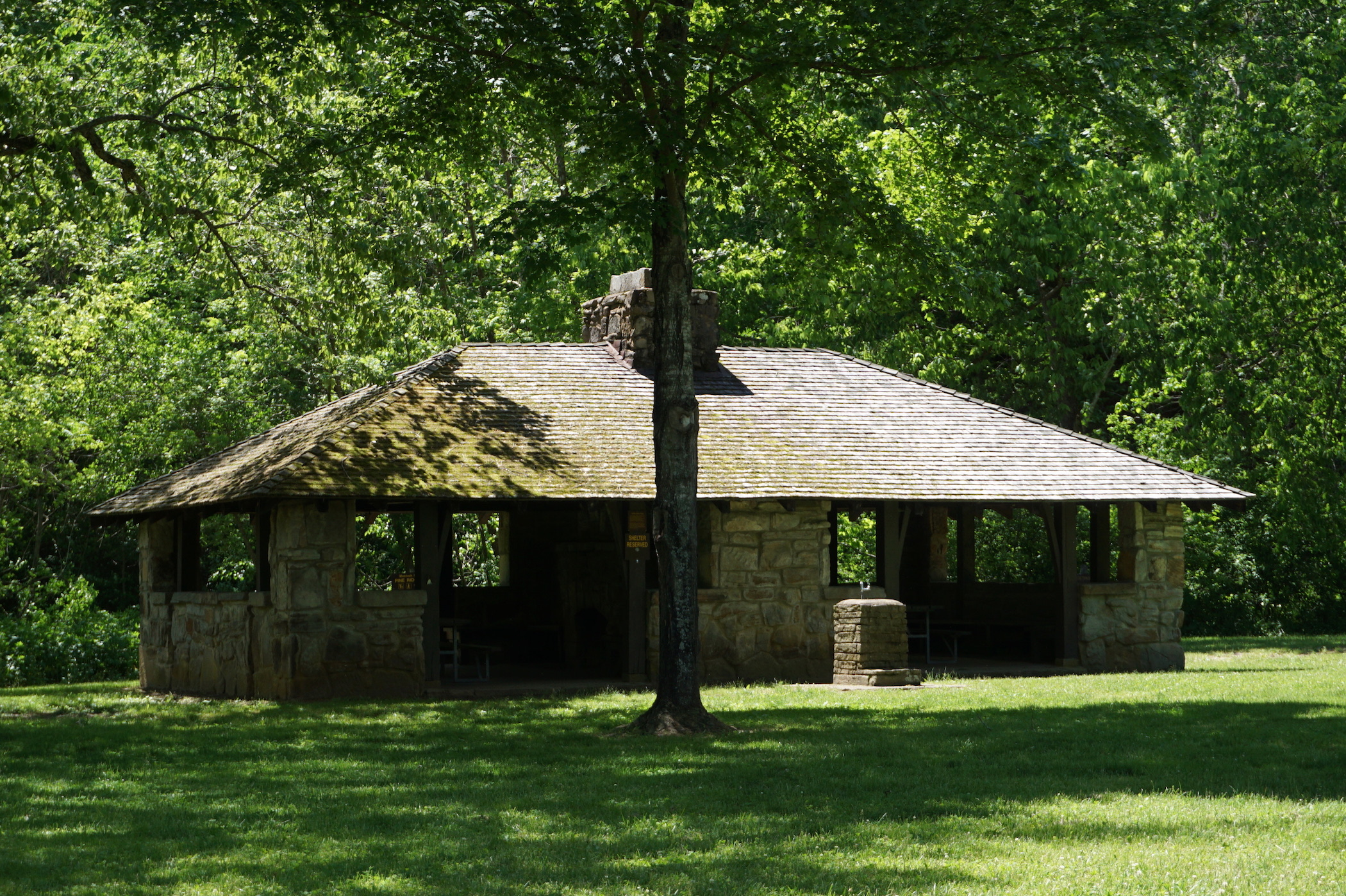
Open Shelter

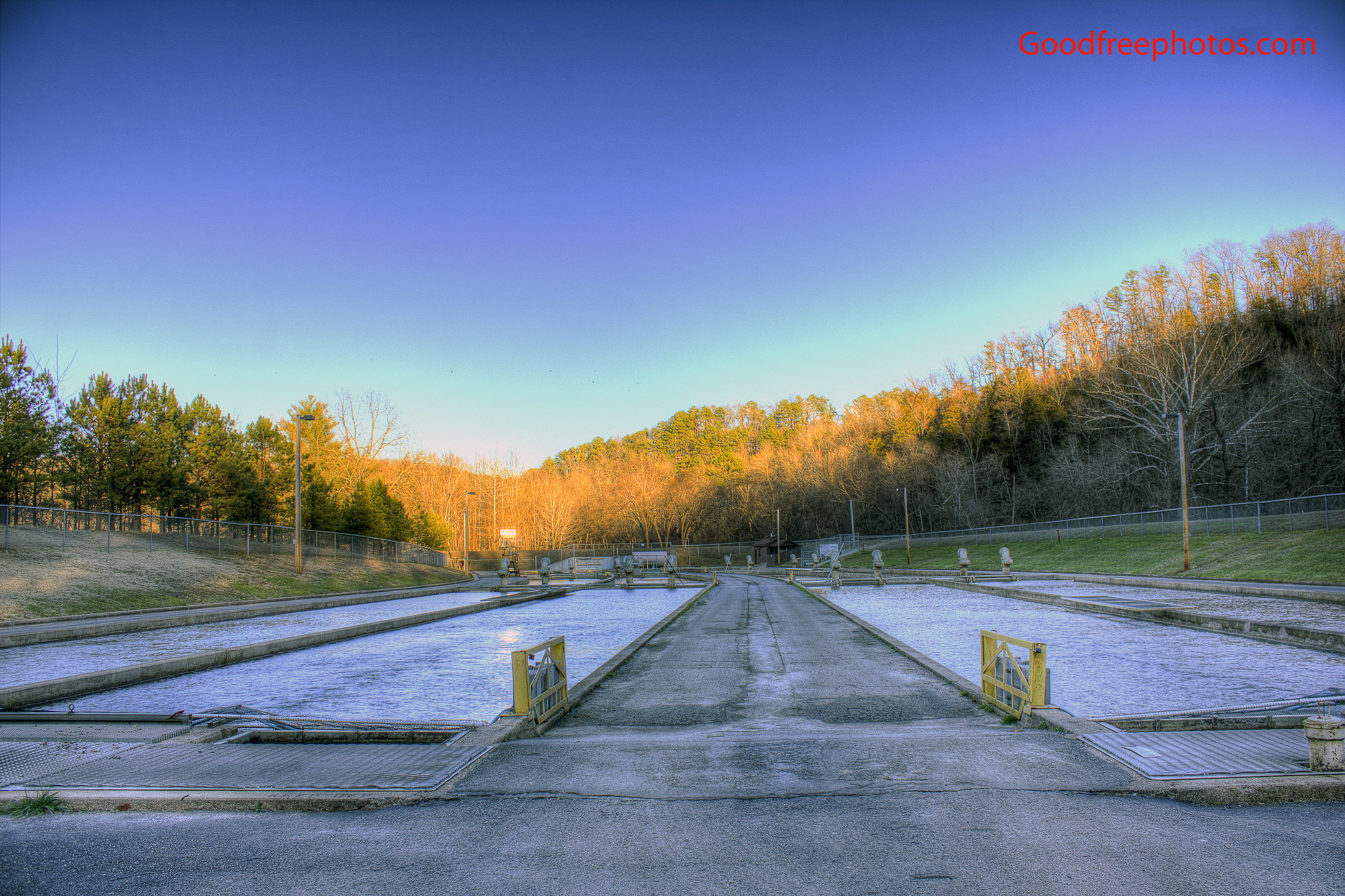
Fish Hatchery

== Activities and amenities ==
Missouri trout park season is Mar 1 to Oct 31. The park's fishing area is divided into three zones, each with its own set of regulations. The park has a hatchery, store, cabins, motel rooms, camping area, and trails for hikers and bicyclists.
