= Dent County, Missouri =

County in Missouri, United States

- County
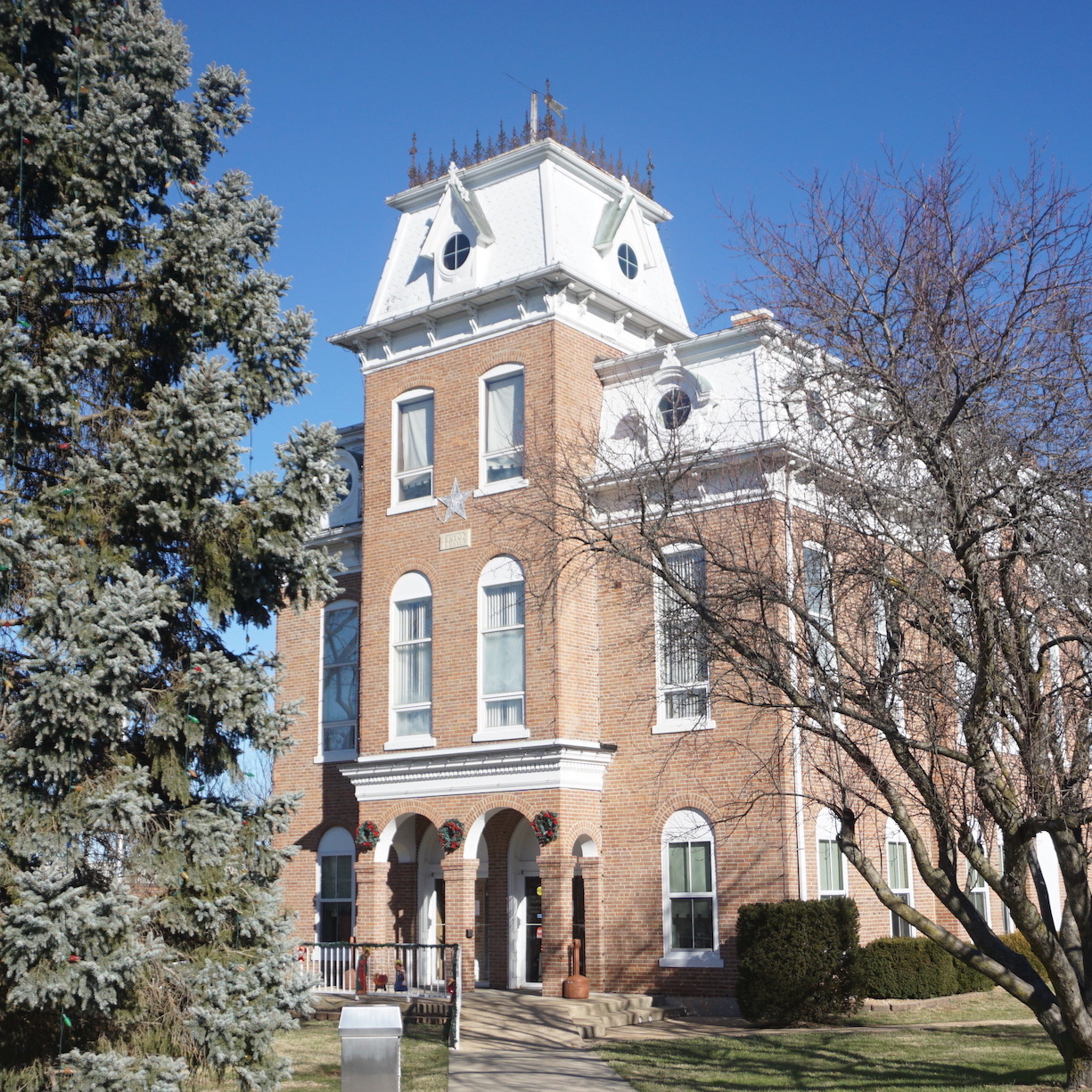
- Dent County Courthouse in Salem

- Location within the U.S. state of Missouri
- Coordinates: 37.61°N 91.50°W
- Country: United States
- State: Missouri
- Founded: February 10, 1851
- Named for: Lewis Dent, a pioneer settler
- Seat: Salem
- Largest city: Salem

Area
  - Total: 755 sq mi (1,960 km^{2})
  - Land: 753 sq mi (1,950 km^{2})
  - Water: 1.7 sq mi (4.4 km^{2}) 0.2%

Population (2020)
  - Total: 14,421
  - Estimate (2025): 14,584 ▲
  - Density: 19.2/sq mi (7.39/km^{2})
- Time zone: UTC−6 (Central)
  - Summer (DST): UTC−5 (CDT)
- Congressional district: 8th
- Website: www.salemmo.com/dent/

Dent County is a county in Missouri. As of the 2020 census, the population was 14,421. The largest city and county seat is Salem. The county was officially organized on February 10, 1851, and is named after state representative Lewis Dent, a pioneer settler who arrived in Missouri from Virginia in 1835.

== History ==
=== Exploration and settlement ===
Henry Rowe Schoolcraft was one of the earliest visitors to the area that would become Dent County, which was then unmapped and unknown. In 1818, Schoolcraft and Levi Pettibone left Potosi, Missouri on an adventure that often left them hungry, lost, lonely and in danger. They first headed west from Potosi on a trail that is now followed by Highway 8, then turned south through southern Dent and Shannon counties, where Schoolcraft found the Current River, "a fine stream with fertile banks and clear, sparkling water.” Today the river attracts tourists who launch canoes by the thousands during the summer to enjoy the fast-moving water of the Current and Jack's Fork Rivers in the Ozark National Scenic Riverways. Schoolcraft traveled to the area of today's Springfield, Missouri, then went east on White River and finally back to Potosi, completing a journey of 89 days.

The White River trail had long been used by Native Americans in Dent County. It later became one of the branches of the Trail of Tears, which saw many Cherokees pass through on their forced trek to Oklahoma. Some stopped in Dent County and many old families take pride in their Cherokee heritage. The "trace" wound from Sligo southwest to the Ephraim Bressie Farm on Spring Creek north of Salem. It left the county about the present town of Maples.

The first white settler was Dominic Walker, who cleared a farm on the Meramec near Short Bend. It was later the site of the Nelson Mill. An abundance of waterpower and difficulty of transportation made mills important in the settling of the new land. Some of the first settlers came in 1829, mostly to the Meramec, Spring Creek and Dry Fork valleys. Land could be purchased for five cents or less an acre. William Thornton, Daniel Troutman and Daniel M. Wooliver were among the 1829 settlers, followed by William Blackwell, Nicholas Berardy, Elisha Nelson, Jerry Potts, Ephraim Bressie, Robert Leonard, Abner Wingfield, Lewis Dent, Wilson Craddock, Thomas Higginbotham, Jack Berry, Silas Hamby, Smith Wofford, Turquill McNeill, Dr. John Hyer, Samuel Hyer and David Lenox.

=== County formation ===
In 1851, the Missouri Assembly created Dent County from Crawford, Shannon, and Texas, Texas counties. It was named for early settler Lewis Dent, who served as the first representative. G.D. Breckenridge, Samuel Hyer, Jr., and Jotham Clark were the first elected county officials. Joseph Millsap served as sheriff and David Henderson as clerk. They met at the Bressie Farm.

The first mayor of Salem was appointed or elected just after the Missouri state legislature passed the laws relating to village government in 1860. He was W.P. Williams, often referred to as "Rip" from the positive and often violent expression of his feelings and opinions. He lived in Dent County a long time and was a prominent citizen throughout his long life. He became mayor in 1860, but how long he served is unknown. The American Civil War came about in 1861 and city governments were suspended. After Williams, records show that O.A. Kenemore, a prominent farmer with a home in Salem, became mayor. E.T. Wingo, a lawyer and representative, was next, followed by Ethan Hedrick, who was also a lawyer but never practiced law. He did, however, serve as Deputy Circuit Clerk and Probate Judge. Allen was succeeded by Samuel Sachs. No dates are available listing terms of office for these mayors, but it is likely they served from 1870 to 1881.

=== Courthouse ===
An earlier log courthouse, built around 1851 or 1852, was Dent County's first, on the Wingfield farm northeast of Salem. In 1852-53 a courthouse was built south of the present courthouse. The building measured about 20 by 40 feet (12 m) and was built by J.T. Garvin for $800. It was burned during the Civil War. The next courthouse, built in 1864, also fell victim to fire in May 1866. The beautiful Victorian courthouse—which is listed in the National Register of Historic Places—was built in 1870 for $15,500. A.E. Dye came to Dent County to build this courthouse. His son, E.L. Dye, assisted him and was to become the leading builder in the county. W.P. Elmer in his history reports that when the courthouse was finished, pictures of it were published in McClure's Magazine and newspapers in the East to show the development of the West.

=== Resources ===
Minerals have greatly influenced the Dent County economy. The iron furnace, built at Sligo, was the greatest, starting in 1880 and active until 1923 (43 years). Sligo was the fourth iron works built in the state, following Meramec, Midland and Nova Scotia. There was plenty of iron ore—Simmons Hill in Salem, Orchard and Cherry Valley, Millsap, Pomeroy, Hawkins Banks, Red Hill and Scotia. Elmer writes in his history that the Sligo furnace was the most successful and continued longer than any other iron furnace in Missouri. The Sligo furnace was built on Crooked Creek and produced 60 to 80 tons of pig iron a day with some runs of up to 100 tons. E.B. Sankey came from New Castle, Pennsylvania in 1870 to survey the St. Louis-Salem and Little Rock Railroad from Cuba to Salem. The Sligo & Eastern Railroad ran a branch to East End to gather wood for the kilns producing charcoal for the furnace. Sligo's population in its big years reached 1,000.

In recent times, the largest mining and milling operations were in the "New Lead Belt" some 30 miles (48 km) east of Salem. St. Joe Lead started the mining boom at Viburnum in neighboring Iron County and soon other major mining companies bought land and mineral rights. The mines brought new families and well-paying jobs with many choosing to live in Salem. Doe Run in nearby St. Francois County continues mining and battery reclamation in the area today.

=== Electrification ===
In 1909, a band of 23 pioneers realized the dream of bringing electric lights to Salem with the formation of the Salem Light & Power Co. The city eventually took over the electric system and produced electricity with two big diesel generators. When the generators could no longer meet the demand and were costly to operate the city contracted with Show-Me-Power Cooperative.

Mrs. Thomas A. Bruce organized the first telephone system. Charlie Jeffries joined the Bruces to install the system around 1900. Homes paid $1 and stores $1.25 per month. Mrs. Bruce suffered agony from her eyes and was blind for 30 years until her death on May 8, 1942. The telephone system was sold to United Telephone, now Sprint.

=== Industry ===
Salem led the world in the production and shipping of railroad ties for a time. While the early lumber companies cut the vast Ozark pine forests, timber has remained a major asset, with white oak staves for barrels, oak flooring, pallets, charcoal briquettes and lumber. The Bunker-Culler Lumber Co. in Bunker was one of the area's biggest industries, and like the mines which hauled wood for the kilns from a large area, Bunker-Culler used rails to bring in logs.

Dent County has had its ups and downs economically, but is proud of its record of having five banks during the Great Depression without a failure. The Great Depression years brought many changes. The Civilian Conservation Corps (CCC) brought young men to the area, many of whom stayed. There were CCC camps at Boss and Indian Trail. In the 13,503 acres (54.64 km^{2}) of the Indian Trail Conservation Area, crews built most of the area's 55 miles (89 km) of access roads. The Conservation Department purchased much of the cut-over land for $2.50/acre.

Dent County's skilled labor force made needlework industries a natural. Ely & Walker's four-story factory (now the Fourth Street Mall) was the first. After World War II the Industrial Building Corporation raised funds for the International Shoe Factory. Other factories followed, including Salem Sportswear, Barad Lingerie, Paramount Cap and Hagale. Today, foreign competition has all but wiped out the local needlework industry.

After World War II and through the 1950s, 60s and 70s, Dent County underwent changes. There were 60 one-room schools in 1950 and consolidation reduced this number to five districts/plus high schools in Salem and Bunker. Roads were built and improved. Salem Memorial District Hospital was built and became a major industry and health provider.

=== Economy ===
Today's largest employer in Dent County, U.S. Foodservice, is an institutional food business and began in Salem as Craig Distributing. After World War II, Farris Craig started with a panel truck and peanut vending machines. In 1986, the Craigs sold their business to Kraft Foods, which later sold to Alliant, and is now owned by U.S. Foodservice. The Craigs have left their imprint on Salem with Craig Plaza, the Alice Lou Craig Municipal Swimming Pool, the Salem Visitor Center, and the Ozark Natural and Cultural Resource Center.

With guidance from University of Missouri Extension, the county became the Feeder Pig & Calf Capitol of Missouri, with huge sales in spring and fall auctioning large numbers of livestock graded into pens for size and quality. Loss of farm population often due to the aging of farm owners ended these sales.

== Geography ==
According to the U.S. Census Bureau, the county has a total area of 755 square miles (1,960 km^{2}), of which 753 square miles (1,950 km^{2}) is land and 1.7 square miles (4.4 km^{2}) (0.2%) is water.

=== Adjacent counties ===
- Crawford County (northeast)
- Iron County (southeast)
- Reynolds County (southeast)
- Shannon County (south)
- Texas County (southwest)
- Phelps County (northwest)

=== National protected areas ===
- Mark Twain National Forest (part)
- Ozark National Scenic Riverways (part)

== Demographics ==
Historical population
Census	Pop.	Note	%±
1860	5,654		—
1870	6,357		12.4%
1880	10,646		67.5%
1890	12,149		14.1%
1900	12,986		6.9%
1910	13,245		2.0%
1920	12,318		−7.0%
1930	10,974		−10.9%
1940	11,763		7.2%
1950	10,936		−7.0%
1960	10,445		−4.5%
1970	11,457		9.7%
1980	14,517		26.7%
1990	13,702		−5.6%
2000	14,927		8.9%
2010	15,657		4.9%
2020	14,421		−7.9%
2025 (est.)	14,584	▲	1.1%
U.S. Decennial Census; 1790-1960 1900-1990; 1990-2000 2010-2015

=== 2020 census ===
As of the 2020 census, the county had a population of 14,421 and a median age of 45.1 years. 22.0% of residents were under the age of 18 and 22.0% were 65 years of age or older. For every 100 females there were 99.6 males, and for every 100 females age 18 and over there were 96.9 males age 18 and over.

The racial makeup of the county was 92.3% White, 0.5% Black or African American, 0.5% American Indian and Alaska Native, 0.4% Asian, 0.0% Native Hawaiian and Pacific Islander, 0.6% from some other race, and 5.7% from two or more races, while Hispanic or Latino residents of any race comprised 1.9% of the population.

Dent County, Missouri – Racial and ethnic composition Note: the US Census treats Hispanic/Latino as an ethnic category. This table excludes Latinos from the racial categories and assigns them to a separate category. Hispanics/Latinos may be of any race.
Race / Ethnicity (NH = Non-Hispanic)	Pop 1980	Pop 1990	Pop 2000	Pop 2010	Pop 2020	% 1980	% 1990	% 2000	% 2010	% 2020
White alone (NH)	14,406	13,513	14,420	15,021	13,203	99.24%	98.62%	96.60%	95.94%	91.55%
Black or African American alone (NH)	0	9	55	55	52	0.00%	0.07%	0.37%	0.35%	0.36%
Native American or Alaska Native alone (NH)	21	60	105	135	61	0.14%	0.44%	0.70%	0.86%	0.42%
Asian alone (NH)	17	28	32	41	54	0.12%	0.20%	0.21%	0.26%	0.37%
Native Hawaiian or Pacific Islander alone (NH)	x	x	2	7	7	x	x	0.01%	0.04%	0.05%
Other race alone (NH)	7	3	4	5	47	0.05%	0.02%	0.03%	0.03%	0.33%
Mixed race or Multiracial (NH)	x	x	197	245	726	x	x	1.32%	1.56%	5.03%
Hispanic or Latino (any race)	66	89	112	148	271	0.45%	0.65%	0.75%	0.95%	1.88%
Total	14,517	13,702	14,927	15,657	14,421	100.00%	100.00%	100.00%	100.00%	100.00%

32.5% of residents lived in urban areas, while 67.5% lived in rural areas.

There were 5,946 households in the county, of which 27.1% had children under the age of 18 living with them and 24.4% had a female householder with no spouse or partner present. About 29.1% of all households were made up of individuals and 14.4% had someone living alone who was 65 years of age or older.

There were 6,819 housing units, of which 12.8% were vacant. Among occupied housing units, 72.8% were owner-occupied and 27.2% were renter-occupied. The homeowner vacancy rate was 2.1% and the rental vacancy rate was 7.1%.

=== 2000 census ===
As of the 2000 census, there were 14,927 people, 5,982 households, and 4,277 families residing in the county. The population density was 20 people per square mile (7.7 people/km^{2}). There were 6,994 housing units at an average density of 9 units per square mile (3.5/km^{2}). The racial makeup of the county was 97.07% White, 0.40% Black or African American, 0.73% Native American, 0.21% Asian, 0.01% Pacific Islander, 0.17% from other races, and 1.41% from two or more races. Approximately 0.75% of the population were Hispanic or Latino of any race.

There were 5,982 households, out of which 30.60% had children under the age of 18 living with them, 59.00% were married couples living together, 9.10% had a female householder with no husband present, and 28.50% were non-families. 25.00% of all households were made up of individuals, and 13.10% had someone living alone who was 65 years of age or older. The average household size was 2.45 and the average family size was 2.90.

24.90% of the county population was under the age of 18, 7.60% from 18 to 24, 25.60% from 25 to 44, 24.10% from 45 to 64, and 17.70% who were 65 years of age or older. The median age was 40 years. For every 100 females there were 94.30 males. For every 100 females age 18 and over, there were 90.70 males.

The median income for a household in the county was $32,991, and the median income for a family was $40,258. Males had a median income of $26,590 versus $17,500 for females. The per capita income for the county was $16,728. About 12.70% of families and 17.20% of the population were below the poverty line, including 24.30% of those under age 18 and 12.20% of those age 65 or over.

=== Religion ===
According to the Association of Religion Data Archives County Membership Report (2000), Dent County is a part of the Bible Belt with evangelical Protestantism being the majority religion. 46% of Dent County residents are considered "Non-adherents" of religion (those who do not attend a particular church regularly) making this the largest single group in the survey. Among the 54% of residents who adhere to a religion, the most predominant denominations in Dent County (who adhere to a religion) are Southern Baptists (67.22%), Pentecostals (6.43%), and Roman Catholics (5.91%).

== Transportation ==
=== Major highways ===
- Route 19
- Route 32
- Route 68
- Route 72
- Route 117
- Route 119

=== Airports ===
- Salem Memorial Airport

== Politics ==
=== Local ===
The Republican Party holds a majority of elected offices in the county, as nine of the county's 14 elected officials, including the county's three commissioners, are all Republicans; .

On July 13, 2015, the county commissioners, Darrell Skiles (R), Dennis Purcell (R), and Gary Larson (R) voted unanimously to lower all flags to half staff every month on the 26th for a year to protest the Supreme Court decision regarding same sex marriage rights.

On July 14, 2015, the county commissioners reversed their decision to lower the flag citing improper flag protocol concerns.

Dent County, Missouri

Elected countywide officials
Assessor	Tina Whitaker	Democratic
Circuit Clerk	Becky Goforth Swiney	Democratic
County Clerk	Angie Curley	Democratic
Collector	Shannon VanKirk	Republican
Commissioner (presiding)	Darrell Skiles	Republican
Commissioner (district 1)	Dennis Purcell	Republican
Commissioner (district 2)	Gary Larson	Republican
Coroner	Gina White	Democratic
Prosecuting Attorney	Andrew Curley	Republican
Public Administrator	Sherida Cook	Republican
Recorder	Cindy Ard	Republican
Sheriff	Bob Wells	Republican
Surveyor	Craig Ruble	Democratic
Treasurer	Denita Williams	Republican

=== State ===
Past Gubernatorial Elections Results
Year	Republican	Democratic	Third Parties
2024	83.38% 5,851	14.48% 1,016	2.14% 150
2020	81.09% 5,768	16.04% 1,141	2.87% 204
2016	73.05% 4,967	24.05% 1,635	2.90% 197
2012	54.20% 3,595	42.56% 2,823	3.24% 215
2008	44.71% 3,055	52.44% 3,583	2.85% 195
2004	65.18% 4,122	33.08% 2,092	1.84% 110
2000	57.39% 3,403	40.49% 2,401	2.12% 126
1996	43.87% 2,445	53.54% 2,984	2.59% 144
1992	44.33% 2,582	55.67% 3,242	0.00% 0
1988	63.56% 3,438	35.72% 1,932	0.72% 39
1984	59.58% 3,580	40.42% 2,429	0.00% 0
1980	52.30% 3,198	47.56% 2,908	0.15% 9
1976	48.13% 2,597	51.82% 2,796	0.06% 3
1972	54.54% 2,632	45.36% 2,189	0.01% 5
1968	45.69% 2,025	54.31% 2,407	0.00% 0
1964	40.11% 1,847	59.89% 2,758	0.00% 0
1960	43.12% 2,487	56.88% 3,820	0.00% 0

In the Missouri House of Representatives, all of Dent County is a part of Missouri's 143rd District and is currently represented by Jeff Pogue (R- Salem).

Missouri House of Representatives — District 143 — Dent County (2016)
Party	Candidate	Votes	%	±%
Republican	Jeff Pogue	5,863	100.00%	

Missouri House of Representatives — District 143 — Dent County (2014)
Party	Candidate	Votes	%	±%
Republican	Jeff Pogue	3,430	100.00%	+24.36

Missouri House of Representatives — District 143 — Dent County (2012)
Party	Candidate	Votes	%	±%
Republican	Jeff Pogue	4,964	75.64%	
Democratic	Shane Van Steenis	1,599	24.36%	

In the Missouri Senate, all of Dent County is a part of Missouri's 16th District and is currently represented by Dan W. Brown (R- Rolla).

Missouri Senate — District 16 — Dent County (2014)
Party	Candidate	Votes	%	±%
Republican	Dan Brown	3,297	100.00%	

=== Federal ===
Missouri's two U.S. senators are Republicans Josh Hawley and Eric Schmitt.

U.S. Senate — Missouri — Dent County (2016)
Party	Candidate	Votes	%	±%
Republican	Roy Blunt	4,653	68.76%	+15.54
Democratic	Jason Kander	1,795	26.53%	−12.37
Libertarian	Jonathan Dine	167	2.47%	−5.41
Green	Johnathan McFarland	88	1.30%	+1.30
Constitution	Fred Ryman	61	0.90%	+0.90
Write-In	Gina Bufe	3	0.04%	+0.04

U.S. Senate — Missouri — Dent County (2012)
Party	Candidate	Votes	%	±%
Republican	Todd Akin	3,499	53.22%	
Democratic	Claire McCaskill	2,558	38.90%	
Libertarian	Jonathan Dine	518	7.88%	

All of Dent County is included in Missouri's 8th congressional district and is currently represented by Republican Jason T. Smith of Salem in the U.S. House of Representatives. Smith won a special election on Tuesday, June 4, 2013, to complete the remaining term of former Republican U.S. Representative Jo Ann Emerson of Cape Girardeau. Emerson announced her resignation a month after being reelected with over 70 percent of the vote in the district. She resigned to become CEO of the National Rural Electric Cooperative.

U.S. House of Representatives — Missouri's 8th Congressional District — Dent County (2016)
Party	Candidate	Votes	%	±%
Republican	Jason T. Smith	5,687	84.23%	+0.51
Democratic	Dave Cowell	923	13.67%	+0.74
Libertarian	Jonathan Shell	142	2.10%	+1.01

U.S. House of Representatives — Missouri's 8th Congressional District — Dent County (2014)
Party	Candidate	Votes	%	±%
Republican	Jason T. Smith	3,445	83.72%	−2.41%
Democratic	Barbara Stocker	532	12.93%	+0.25
Libertarian	Rick Vandeven	45	1.09%	+0.51
Constitution	Doug Enyart	36	0.87%	+0.87
Independent	Terry Hampton	57	1.39%	+1.39

U.S. House of Representatives — Missouri's 8th Congressional District — Dent County (Special Election 2013)
Party	Candidate	Votes	%	±%
Republican	Jason T. Smith	2,385	86.13%	+7.62
Democratic	Steve Hodges	351	12.68%	
Libertarian	Bill Slantz	16	0.58%	
Constitution	Doug Enyart	17	0.61%	+0.61

U.S. House of Representatives — Missouri's 8th Congressional District — Dent County (2012)
Party	Candidate	Votes	%	±%
Republican	Jo Ann Emerson	5,151	78.51%	
Democratic	Jack Rushin	1,213	18.49%	
Libertarian	Rick Vandeven	197	3.00%	

==== Political culture ====
United States presidential election results for Dent County, Missouri
Year	Republican		Democratic		Third party(ies)	
Year	No.	%	No.	%	No.	%
1888	957	43.50%	1,172	53.27%	71	3.23%
1892	896	40.78%	1,268	57.72%	33	1.50%
1896	1,097	42.22%	1,493	57.47%	8	0.31%
1900	1,085	42.72%	1,419	55.87%	36	1.42%
1904	1,154	48.59%	1,186	49.94%	35	1.47%
1908	1,290	48.44%	1,330	49.94%	43	1.61%
1912	959	38.50%	1,280	51.38%	252	10.12%
1916	1,252	44.99%	1,457	52.35%	74	2.66%
1920	2,204	51.69%	1,970	46.20%	90	2.11%
1924	1,779	42.84%	2,263	54.49%	111	2.67%
1928	2,367	55.49%	1,871	43.86%	28	0.66%
1932	1,701	33.90%	3,293	65.64%	23	0.46%
1936	2,313	41.95%	3,168	57.45%	33	0.60%
1940	2,652	45.99%	3,101	53.78%	13	0.23%
1944	2,456	47.58%	2,699	52.29%	7	0.14%
1948	2,003	40.14%	2,973	59.58%	14	0.28%
1952	2,755	50.12%	2,738	49.81%	4	0.07%
1956	2,658	47.30%	2,961	52.70%	0	0.00%
1960	3,212	55.33%	2,593	44.67%	0	0.00%
1964	1,788	38.47%	2,860	61.53%	0	0.00%
1968	2,369	50.97%	1,810	38.94%	469	10.09%
1972	3,024	63.88%	1,710	36.12%	0	0.00%
1976	2,433	45.05%	2,931	54.27%	37	0.69%
1980	3,477	56.71%	2,528	41.23%	126	2.06%
1984	3,490	57.84%	2,544	42.16%	0	0.00%
1988	2,975	54.92%	2,421	44.69%	21	0.39%
1992	2,125	36.16%	2,689	45.75%	1,063	18.09%
1996	2,542	45.90%	2,234	40.34%	762	13.76%
2000	3,996	66.73%	1,839	30.71%	153	2.56%
2004	4,369	69.31%	1,865	29.58%	70	1.11%
2008	4,655	67.78%	2,056	29.94%	157	2.29%
2012	4,883	73.20%	1,585	23.76%	203	3.04%
2016	5,600	82.46%	978	14.40%	213	3.14%
2020	5,987	83.83%	1,056	14.79%	99	1.39%
2024	6,013	84.65%	1,025	14.43%	65	0.92%

Dent County is, like most rural counties, conservative and often solidly supports Republicans at the presidential level. Bill Clinton was the last Democratic presidential nominee to win Dent County in 1992; he lost the county during his 1996 reelection bid, and since then, voters in Dent County have strongly backed Republicans.

Like most rural areas throughout Southeast Missouri, voters in Dent County generally adhere to socially and culturally conservative principles which tend to influence their Republican leanings. In 2004, Missourians voted on a constitutional amendment to define marriage as the union between a man and a woman—it overwhelmingly passed Dent County with 85.93 percent of the vote. The initiative passed the state with 71 percent of support from voters as Missouri became the first state to ban same-sex marriage. In 2006, Missourians voted on a constitutional amendment to fund and legalize embryonic stem cell research in the state—it failed in Dent County with 66.49 percent voting against the measure. The initiative narrowly passed the state with 51 percent of support from voters as Missouri became one of the first states in the nation to approve embryonic stem cell research. Despite Dent County's longstanding tradition of supporting socially conservative platforms, voters in the county have a penchant for advancing populist causes like increasing the minimum wage. In 2006, Missourians voted on a proposition (Proposition B) to increase the minimum wage in the state to $6.50 an hour—it passed Dent County with 69.70 percent of the vote. The proposition strongly passed every single county in Missouri with 78.99 percent voting in favor as the minimum wage was increased to $6.50 an hour in the state. During the same election, voters in five other states also strongly approved increases in the minimum wage. In 2015, Dent County commissioners voted to officially mourn the US Supreme Court ruling which legalized same-sex marriage. The flags at the Dent County Courthouse and the Judicial Building were to be lowered to below half-staff on the 26th of each month for a year. However, after encountering criticism from supporters, the commissioners reversed their decision.

== Education ==
Of adults 25 years of age and older in Dent County, 66.3% possesses a high school diploma or higher while 10.1% holds a bachelor's degree or higher as their highest educational attainment.

=== Public schools ===
- Dent-Phelps R-III School District - Salem
- Green Forest R-II School District - Salem
  - Green Forest Elementary School (K-08)
- North Wood R-IV School District - Salem
  - North Wood Elementary School (PK-08)
- Oak Hill R-I School District - Salem
  - Oak Hill Elementary School (PK-08)
  - Dent-Phelps Elementary School (K-08)
- Salem R-80 School District - Salem
  - William H. Lynch Elementary School (K-02)
  - Salem Upper Elementary School (03-06)
  - Salem Jr. High School (07-09)
  - Salem High School (10-12)

=== Alternative and vocational schools ===
- Salem 61 School - Salem - (K-12) - Special Education
- Ozark Hills State School - Salem - (K-12) - A school for handicapped students and those with other special needs.

=== Colleges and universities ===
- Southwest Baptist University Annex - Salem - A satellite campus of Southwest Baptist University.

=== Public libraries ===
- Salem Public Library

== Communities ==
=== Cities ===
- Bunker
- Salem (county seat)

=== Unincorporated communities ===
- Anutt
- Bangert
- Boss
- Condray
- Cooksey
- Coulstone
- Custer
- Darien
- Doss
- Fawn
- Gladden
- Hedrick
- Hobson
- Howes
- Howes Mill
- Jack
- Jadwin
- Joy
- Lake Spring
- Lecoma
- Lenox
- Montauk
- Mounce
- Ranger
- Rhyse
- Sligo
- Short Bend
- Stone Hill

== See also ==
- National Register of Historic Places listings in Dent County, Missouri
