= National Register of Historic Places listings in Crawford County, Missouri =

Location of Crawford County in Missouri

This is a list of the National Register of Historic Places listings in Crawford County, Missouri.

This is intended to be a complete list of the properties and districts on the National Register of Historic Places in Crawford County, Missouri, United States. Several National Register buildings and districts have latitude and longitude coordinates, which may be used to plot their positions together on a map.

There are 14 properties and districts listed on the National Register in the county.

This National Park Service list is complete through NPS recent listings posted December 12, 2025.

== Current listings ==
	Name on the Register	Image	Date listed	Location	City or town	Description
1	Big Bend Rural School		December 12, 1978 (#78001643)	Route 19; 37°59′47″N 91°22′31″W	Steelville	
2	Cuba City Jail	Cuba City Jail	October 29, 2014 (#14000880)	Prairie St. & 300 blk. of S. Main St. 38°03′40″N 91°24′16″W	Cuba	Part of the Cuba, Missouri Multiple Property Submission (MPS)
3	Cuba High School Annex	Cuba High School Annex	May 1, 2013 (#13000223)	308 N. Smith St. 38°03′49″N 91°24′31″W	Cuba	Part of the Cuba, Missouri Multiple Property Submission (MPS)
4	Cuba Lodge No. 312 A.F. and A.M.	Cuba Lodge No. 312 A.F. and A.M.	October 29, 2014 (#14000881)	201 N. Smith St. 38°03′46″N 91°24′26″W	Cuba	Part of the Cuba, Missouri Multiple Property Submission (MPS)
5	Dillard Mill Historic District	Dillard Mill Historic District	January 14, 2015 (#14001157)	142 Dillard Mill Rd. 37°43′03″N 91°12′24″W	Davisville vicinity	
6	George B. Hamilton House	George B. Hamilton House	October 29, 2014 (#14000882)	401 E. Washington St. 38°03′48″N 91°24′04″W	Cuba	
7	Maj. Gen. William S. Harney Summer Home	Maj. Gen. William S. Harney Summer Home	April 19, 1984 (#84002144)	332 S. Mansion Ave. 38°12′13″N 91°09′48″W	Sullivan	
8	Hotel Cuba	Hotel Cuba	October 29, 2014 (#14000883)	509 E. Main St. 38°03′48″N 91°23′57″W	Cuba	
9	John Manson Munro House	John Manson Munro House	October 29, 2014 (#14000884)	305 W. Washington Ave. 38°03′44″N 91°24′20″W	Cuba	
10	Scotia Iron Furnace Stack	Scotia Iron Furnace Stack	May 21, 1969 (#69000099)	6.3 miles (10.1 km) south east of Leasburg on County Road H 38°02′09″N 91°11′48″W	Leasburg	
11	Shamrock Court	Shamrock Court	March 28, 2022 (#100007530)	1246 South Service Rd. 38°12′09″N 91°10′41″W	Sullivan	
12	Snelson-Brinker House	Snelson-Brinker House	June 21, 2007 (#07000576)	Route 8; 37°56′56″N 91°30′04″W	Steelville	
13	Uptown Cuba Historic District	Uptown Cuba Historic District	March 13, 2013 (#13000072)	Roughly W. Main Ave., N. and S. Smith and S. Hickory Sts., and W. Washington Boulevard; 38°03′40″N 91°24′24″W	Cuba	
14	Wagon Wheel Motel, Cafe and Station	Wagon Wheel Motel, Cafe and Station	April 7, 2003 (#03000183)	901-905 E. Washington St. 38°03′52″N 91°23′43″W	Cuba	

== See also ==
- List of National Historic Landmarks in Missouri
- National Register of Historic Places listings in Missouri
