= Celia (slave) =

Enslaved African American (d. 1855)

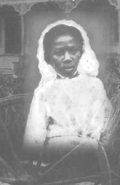
- Born: c. 1835
- Died: December 21, 1855 (aged 19–20); Missouri, U.S.
- Cause of death: Execution by hanging
- Known for: Being convicted of murder for killing her master in self-defense
- Partner: George
- Children: 3
- Status: Executed (1855); Pardoned (2024)
- Conviction: First degree murder
- Penalty: Death

Celia (c. 1835 – December 21, 1855) was an enslaved woman who was convicted of murdering her enslaver, Robert Newsom, in Callaway County, Missouri. Her defense team, led by John Jameson, argued an affirmative defense: Celia killed Robert Newsom by accident in self-defense to stop Newsom from raping her, which was a controversial argument at the time. Celia was ultimately executed by hanging following a denied appeal in December 1855. Celia's memory was revitalized by civil rights activist Margaret Bush Wilson who commissioned a portrait of Celia from Solomon Thurman.

Celia was posthumously pardoned by Governor Mike Parson on December 20, 2024.

== Background ==
Not much is known of Celia's origins or early childhood. Robert Newsom, a yeoman farmer, acquired approximately 14-year-old Celia, born around 1835, in Audrain County in 1850 to act as his concubine after his wife had died the previous year. However, this purpose may have been masqueraded as acquiring a domestic servant for his daughter Virginia Waynescott or as a same-aged companion for his youngest child Mary Newsom. On the way back to Callaway County, Newsom sexually assaulted Celia for the first time.

Newsom housed Celia separately from his other five slaves, all male, in a cabin close to the main house. Celia became involved with George, one of Newsom's four adult male slaves, and began sharing this cabin with him by the beginning of 1855.

Celia had three children, at least one of which was indisputably Robert Newsom's. Sometime during Celia's incarceration, Celia delivered her third child. Earlier historians reported that this child was stillborn. More recent scholarship posits this child was sold following birth and is from whom Celia's living descendants are descended. Following her execution, Harry Newsom, one of Robert Newsom's adult sons, may have acquired one of her daughters, because a female enslaved child appears in his household in the 1860 census. According to the probate court of Callaway County, Celia's daughters were sold in the year following her execution.

It is unknown where Celia's remains are interred.

== State of Missouri vs. Celia, a Slave ==
In early 1855, Celia, approximately nineteen, conceived for the third time, and the father of the child was uncertain. At this time, George demanded Celia cut off her relationship with Robert Newsom. Celia repeatedly requested, demanded, and threatened Newsom to stop sexually coercing her. On June 23, 1855, when Newsom came to her cabin that night, Celia struck Newsom twice with a large stick, killing him with the second blow. She burned his body in her fireplace while her two children slept through the confrontation. The following day, the search party consisting of the Newsom household and William Powell, a neighboring farmer, questioned first George and then Celia, who after sustained questioning, eventually confessed. Celia repeatedly denied George's involvement in the planning or execution of the murder, as well as the disposal of the body. After Celia's arrest, George was sold to another family.

State of Missouri vs. Celia, a Slave ran from June 25 to October 10, 1855. Celia's testimony does not appear in the trial records because, at that time in Missouri, slaves were not allowed to testify in their defense if their word disputed a white person's.

It is a crime "to take any woman unlawfully against her will and by force, menace or duress, compel her to be defiled."

— Missouri statute of 1845, article 2, section 29

Judge William Augustus Hall appointed Celia's defense team: John Jameson, the lead defense attorney and himself a slave owner, Nathan Chapman Kouns, and recent law school graduate Isaac M. Boulware. The defense contended Newsom's death was justifiable homicide and argued that Celia, even though she was a slave, was entitled by Missouri law to use deadly force to defend herself against sexual coercion. The defense based their argument on the Missouri statute of 1845, which declared "any woman" could be the victim of sexual assault; the defense argued "any woman" included slaves like Celia.

Judge Hall denied the defense's jury instruction to acquit based on the sexual assault and denied the jury any ability to acquit on grounds for self-defense or to find Celia justified to ward off her master's sexual advances with force or at all. Celia's jury consisted entirely of white male farmers, four of whom were slave owners; they convicted Celia on October 10, 1855. Celia's defense team filed a motion for a retrial based on alleged judicial misconduct by Judge Hall; the judge overruled this motion, and Celia was sentenced on October 13, 1855, to be executed by hanging November 16, 1855. The defense appealed to the Missouri Supreme Court, but the judge did not grant a stay of execution.

Celia escaped Callaway Country Jail on November 11; she remained at large until the beginning of December to prevent her death before the Supreme Court could rule on her case. Harry Newsom returned Celia to the jail after she escaped. The Callaway Circuit Court ruled against Celia's stay of execution on December 18, 1855, as there was no doubt she had killed Robert Newsom, and they judged her motives irrelevant. The night before her execution, Celia gave a full confession and once again denied that anyone had helped her, including George. This confession was reported in the Fulton Telegraph and published no mention of the sexual abuse by Newsom or Celia's children by him.

On December 21, 1855, Celia was hanged at 2:30 in the afternoon.

== Celia through history and popular culture ==
Celia's trial was widely reported on. Papers hundreds of miles away reported on her arrest. William Lloyd Garrison's The Liberator repeated the early supposition that Newsom's death was without motive. Mary Ann Shadd Cary's Provincial Freeman, all the way in Canada, and The New York Times reported on her execution, all without details of her case or motive. Local newspapers like the Fulton Telegraph and Brunswick Weekly Brunswicker included the details of the murder but not her motive.

While no contemporary portraits or written descriptions of Celia are known to exist, Margaret Bush Wilson revitalized Celia's memory when she learned about her case in 1940 and later commissioned Solomon Thurman in 1990 to create a portrait of Celia.

Since 2004, Callawegians in Fulton, Missouri, have held a public event commemorating Celia's life on the anniversary of her execution. Celia's commemoration is often used as an opportunity to raise awareness about racism, sexism, domestic violence, and the historical intersection of slavery and sexual violence in America. Both Solomon Thurman and Melton McLaurin, the author of Celia's most popular biography, have attended this event honoring Celia.

Two plays have been written about Celia:

- Pawley, Thomas, III. Song of the Middle River (play), 2003
- Seyda, Barbara. Celia, a Slave (Yale Drama Series), 2015.

Following a petition by her descendants, Celia was posthumously pardoned by Governor Mike Parson on December 20, 2024.

== See also ==
- Annice (slave), executed by Missouri in 1828
- Harriet Jacobs
- Joan Little, black woman who killed a white guard in self-defense when he tried to rape her
- Mary (slave), executed by Missouri in 1838
- List of wrongful convictions in the United States
- Wrongful execution
