= State of Missouri v. Celia, a Slave =

1855 murder trial in the United States

- Court: Circuit Court of Callaway County, Missouri,
- Decided: October 10, 1855
- Verdict: Guilty
- Charge: First-degree murder

Case history
- Appealed to: Supreme Court of Missouri
- Subsequent action: Sentenced to death

State of Missouri v. Celia, a Slave was an 1855 murder trial held in the Circuit Court of Callaway County, Missouri, in which an enslaved woman named Celia was tried for the first-degree murder of her enslaver, Robert Newsom. Celia was convicted by a jury of twelve white men and sentenced to death. An appeal of the conviction was denied by the Supreme Court of Missouri in December 1855, and Celia was hanged on December 21, 1855.

At the request of her descendants, Celia was posthumously pardoned by Governor Mike Parson on December 20, 2024.

== Background ==
Sometime around 1819, Robert Newsom left his home state of Virginia and traveled west and eventually settled in Callaway County, Missouri, with his wife and children. By 1850, Newsom considered himself a prosperous man in his new home, where he owned eight hundred acres of land and enslaved five men. Newsom's wife died sometime in 1849, and, less than a year later in 1850, Newsom travelled to Audrain County to purchase Celia, the first girl to be enslaved on his plantation. It is likely that Newsom raped the 14-year-old Celia for the first time on the journey from Audrain County back to Callaway County.

Back on Newsom's property in Callaway County, Celia lived only about fifty feet away from the main house and separately from the enslaved men. Between 1850 and 1855, Newsom repeatedly raped Celia, and she bore two children over the course of those five years, one of whom was confirmed to be fathered by Newsom.

At some point before 1855, Celia began a romantic relationship with George, one of the enslaved men. In 1855, Celia was pregnant for a third time with a child that was likely fathered by either George or Newsom. At some point, George gave Celia an ultimatum and told her "he would have nothing more to do with her if she did not quit the old man." Celia attempted to plead with Newsom's family members and with Newsom himself. Sometime on or around June 23, 1855, Celia begged Newsom to leave her alone because she was sick and pregnant. Newsom refused and told her that "he was coming down to her cabin that night."

Celia threatened Newsom and told him that she would hurt him if he tried to rape her again. After her conversation with Newsom, Celia went and found a large stick, which she placed in the corner of her cabin.

== Killing ==
On the night of June 23, 1855, after the rest of his family had gone to bed, Robert Newsom came to Celia's cabin, as he had told her that he would. Celia made an attempt to reject his predatory advances, and when he refused to back down, she clubbed him over the head with the stick that she had brought into her cabin earlier that day. After she had hit him the first time, he reached out his arms as if he was trying to grab her. She clubbed him a second time, which killed him. She then moved his body into her fireplace and spent the rest of the night burning his remains. She crushed some of Newsom's smaller bones with a rock, and hid the bones that were too big to crush "under the hearth, and under the floor between a sleeper and the fire-place." The next morning, Celia enlisted the help of Newsom's grandson, twelve-year-old Coffee Wainscott, in scattering the ashes of Robert Newsom. According to Coffee's testimony, Celia told him "she would give [him] two dozen walnuts if [he] would carry the ashes out."

=== Investigation ===
On the morning of June 24, 1855, Robert Newsom's daughters began to worry when he did not show up for breakfast. They began to search for him around the property and enlisted the help of some neighbors when their search was unsuccessful. William Powell, the owner of the plantation next to the Newsoms', and Robert Newsom's sons, Harry and David, were among those who joined the search party. Powell questioned George about Newsom's whereabouts, and he told the search party that "it was not worth while to hunt for him anywhere except close around the house." Upon further questioning, George also stated that "he believed the last walking [Newsom] had done was along the path, pointing to the path leading from the house to the Negro Cabin."

After a search of Celia's cabin had turned up nothing, William Powell interrogated Celia, who made no attempt to flee after she had killed her owner but instead resumed her normal activities. Celia initially denied any knowledge of what had happened to Newsom, but Powell continued to interrogate her and used accusations and threats to get her to confess. Eventually, Celia confessed that she had killed Newsom and attempted to dispose of his body, but she maintained that "she did not intend to kill him when she struck him, but only wanted to hurt him."

After obtaining Celia's confession, the family gathered evidence of Robert Newsom's remains and collected them in a box.

=== Arrest ===
The next day, June 25, 1855, David Newsom filed an affidavit, and a warrant for inquest was issued. A six-man inquest jury was summoned to Robert Newsom's estate to hear testimonies from William Powell, Coffee Wainscott, and Celia. After hearing the testimonies, the inquest jury determined that there was probable cause to arrest Celia for the murder of Robert Newsom. Celia was arrested and sent to Callaway County jail to await her trial in October. After her arrest, Celia was interrogated once more in her cell by Jefferson Jones to determine whether she had been acting alone in her crime. Despite Jones's insistent questioning, Celia repeatedly denied having had any assistance in killing Robert Newsom or in burning his body.

== Court proceedings ==
Celia was formally indicted by a grand jury on August 16, 1855, and on the same day, Judge William Augustus Hall appointed her defense team, led by John Jameson. On October 9, 1855, Celia was brought before the Callaway County Circuit Court to be tried by a jury of twelve white men. She entered a plea of "not guilty," and the trial officially began.

== Witnesses called by prosecution ==
=== Jefferson Jones ===
The first witness called by the prosecution was Colonel Jefferson Jones, who had interviewed Celia in her cell after her indictment and arrest. He recounted the details of his conversation with Celia; she had told him "the old man had been having sexual intercourse with her" and that on the night of the murder, she had "told him not to come, that if he came she would hurt him." Jones then described the manner in which Celia had killed Newsom and disposed of his body, as Celia had described it to him. The defense's cross-examination of Jefferson Jones focused on the sexual relationship between Newsom and Celia, including the fact that "her second child was his" and that "the deceased forced her on the way home from Audrain County." Although Jones stated that he could not "say positively" whether Newsom had forced Celia on the trip from Audrain County to Callaway County, he said that "it was heard that he did," and it seems unlikely that he would have "heard" that information from anyone other than Celia herself. The defense also questioned Jones about Celia's motives, and Jones testified that Celia had told him she "did not intend to kill, but only to hurt him [Newsom]." However, the prosecution objected to that line of questioning, Judge Hall sustained the objection, and Jones's response was stricken from the record.

=== Harry Newsom ===
Harry Newsom, son of Robert Newsom, was the next witness called by the prosecution. He was questioned about the investigation into his father's disappearance, which had taken place on the morning of Sunday, June 24, 1855. Newsom described how, after he had joined the search party, "some bones were found a short distance from [Celia's] cabin along a path" and how he and his sister, Virginia Wainscott had collected the bone fragments they had found in a box, which they then left with "Mr. Bentley, the circuit court clerk."

=== Virginia Wainscott ===
Next, the prosecution called Virginia Wainscott, Robert Newsom's oldest daughter, to the stand. When questioned about the investigation into her father's disappearance, Wainscott described how she had "hunted on all of the paths and walks and every place for him" before she "learned where the bones were put" on the evening of June 24, 1855. She described finding bones in the ashes that were found in and around the cabin where Celia lived, as well as a buckle, buttons, and a knife, which she identified as having belonged to her father.

In the defense's cross-examination of Virginia Wainscott, she testified that "Celia had been sick. Took sick in February and had been sick ever since," which suggested that the defense was attempting to build sympathy for Celia among the jury. The defense also questioned Wainscott about her father's sleeping arrangements, particularly on the night of the murder, although Wainscott provided little information in her answers and stayed that she "did not notice the bed" in which her father had supposedly slept.

=== Coffee Wainscott ===
Robert Newsom's grandson Coffee Wainscott was the next witness to take the stand. He testified that had been "up in the cherry tree early in the morning grandpa was missing" and that Celia had offered him "two dozen walnuts" if he would carry the ashes out of her cabin. Coffee testified that he had agreed to Celia's offer and taken the ashes and spread them along the side of the path, where he later witnessed the search party "picking bones up out of the ashes." In their cross-examination of Coffee Wainscott, the defense questioned him about his grandfather's sleeping arrangements on the night of his murder, much as they had questioned his mother, Virginia Wainscott. Coffee provided the defense with little information, other than the fact that his four-year-old brother, Billy, had been sleeping in the same room as their grandfather that night.

=== William Powell ===
Next, the prosecution called Robert Newsom's neighbor William Powell to the stand. Powell had led the investigation into Newsom's disappearance. When questioned by the prosecution, he simply recounted how and where Newsom's bones had been discovered by the search party. In its cross-examination of William Powell, Celia's defense team questioned him about his interrogation with Celia on the day of the investigation, June 23, 1855. Powell revealed in his testimony that Celia had confessed to Newsom's murder only after he had threatened her repeatedly and told her "that it would be better for her to tell - that her children would not be taken away from her if she would tell, and that [he] had rope fashioned for her if she would not tell." He also testified that Celia had told him that she had "threatened to hurt him [Newsom] if he did not quit forcing her while she was sick" and that "she did not want to kill him, struck him but did not want to kill him."

=== Dr. Smith and Dr. Young ===
Finally, the prosecution called Dr. Smith and Dr. Young to the stand to examine the bones that had been collected from the ashes in and around Celia's cabin. Both doctors testified that the bones were those of an adult human.

== Witnesses called by defense ==
=== Dr. James Martin ===
The first witness called by the defense was Dr. James M. Martin, a physician. The defense posed to Dr. Martin a series of questions designed to establish doubt in the minds of the jurors that Celia unassisted could have killed Newsom and disposed of his body in the manner described by the prosecution. The defense asked, "Could the body of a human being be destroyed by burning in a common fireplace from 10 o'clock pm to 4 o'clock am?" The prosecution objected to the question, and Judge Hall sustained the objection. Twice, the defense attempted to rephrase the question, but the prosecution objected each time, and Judge Hall sustained each objection, forcing the defense to abandon that line of questioning.

=== Thomas Shoatman ===
Next, the defense called Thomas Shoatman to the stand. Shoatman had been present when Celia had been questioned by Jefferson Jones in July after her arrest. The defense questioned Shoatman about the reasons that Celia had given for striking Newsom the first and second times. Shoatman testified that Celia had said that she struck Newsom the first time "only to hurt him, to keep him from having sexual intercourse with her" (although the phrase "to keep him from having sexual intercourse with her" was stricken from the record after an objection from the prosecution) and that she had struck the second blow because "he threw his hands up, that she was afraid he would catch her." With Thomas Shoatman's testimony, the defense attempted to convince the jurors that Celia had been acting in self-defense when she had killed Newsom.

== Decision ==
=== Jury instructions ===
Both the defense and the prosecution were allowed to submit proposed jury instructions to Judge Hall, which he could choose to accept or reject. Celia's defense team submitted several instructions to Judge Hall that requested for the jury to acquit Celia if it believed that she had been justifiably resisting sexual assault when she had killed Robert Newsom. In Missouri, it was then a crime "to take any woman unlawfully against her will and by force, menace or duress, compel her to be defiled," and resistance of such an offense would have been considered a justifiable excuse for a woman to kill a man. The defense requested for the jury to be instructed that the words "any woman" included enslaved women, and that Celia should not be convicted if it believed that she had been attempting to resist rape when she had killed Newsom. Judge Hall did not accept the proposed instructions, and they were not delivered to the jury. The instructions that were actually given to the jury did not address the motive for Celia's crime at all or allow for an acquittal based on the idea that she would have been justified in using physical force to resist sexual assault at the hands of her master.

=== Verdict ===
On October 10, 1855, the jury found Celia guilty of murder in the first degree.

=== Aftermath ===
The day after the jury reached their verdict, Celia's defense team requested that the court "set aside the verdict of the jury... and grant a new trial." Judge Hall denied their request and sentenced Celia to be "hanged by the neck until dead on the sixteenth day of November 1855." Celia's defense team then requested for an appeal to be heard by the Supreme Court of Missouri. The appeal was granted, but Judge Hall refused to issue a stay of execution order to guarantee that Celia would not be executed before her appeal could be heard. On the night of November 11, 1855, just five days before she was scheduled to be hanged, Celia was taken from her jail cell. She was returned to her cell sometime after her original date of execution had passed and given a new execution date, December 21. After her return, Celia's defense team wrote a letter to Judge Abiel Leonard of the Supreme Court of Missouri, explaining that Celia had been "taken out by someone" and that they felt "more than ordinary interest in behalf of the girl Celia, believing that she did the act (of slaying Newsom) to prevent a forced sexual assault." They also included a record of Celia's case, which they asked the Supreme Court to review, and requested for a stay of execution order to be issued to ensure that Celia would not be executed before the Supreme Court had a chance to review her case. The Supreme Court responded on December 14, 1855, and stated that "upon an examination of the record and proceedings of the Circuit Court of Callaway County in the above case, it is thought proper to refuse the prayer of the petitioner.... It is therefore ordered by the Court, that an order for the Stay of the execution in this case be refused."

Celia was hanged on December 21, 1855, at 2:30 p.m.

At the request of her descendants, Celia was posthumously pardoned by Governor Mike Parson on December 20, 2024.

== Legal status of slavery ==
Celia's trial took place at a time when slavery was an extremely contentious issue in America, and the verdict had important implications for the legal status of enslaved persons, particularly black women. At that time, enslavers were allowed to rape, when the legal status of the enslaved as property offered few protections or privileges of law. Legally, Celia was only seen as a human subject when she was being punished. As Saidiya Hartman states, "As Missouri v. Celia demonstrated, the enslaved could neither give nor refuse consent, nor offer reasonable resistance, yet they were criminally responsible and liable. The slave was recognized as a reasoning subject, who possessed intent and rationality, solely in the context of criminal liability." The case also implicated white women who had continuously looked the other way as their husbands and male family members raped enslaved women.

== See also ==
- Annice (slave), executed by Missouri in 1828
- Mary (slave), executed by Missouri in 1838
