= William A. Hall =

American politician (1815–1888)

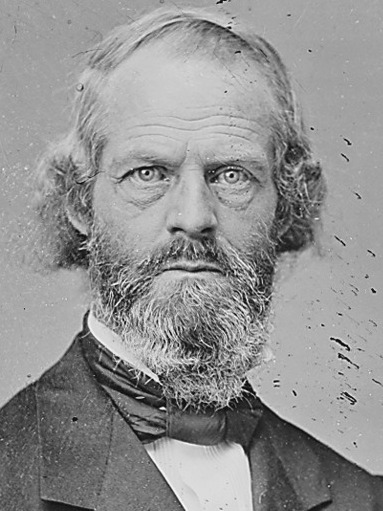

Member of the U.S. House of Representatives from Missouri
- In office January 20, 1862 – March 3, 1865
- Preceded by: John Bullock Clark
- Succeeded by: John F. Benjamin
- Constituency: 3rd district (1862–1863); 9th district (1863–1865)

Personal details
- Born: William Augustus Hall; October 15, 1815 Portland, Maine, US
- Died: October 15, 1888 (aged 73) Darksville, Missouri, US
- Party: Democratic
- Relatives: John H. Hall (father); William Preble Hall (son); Uriel Sebree Hall (son); Willard Preble Hall (brother)

William Augustus Hall (October 15, 1815 – December 15, 1888) was an American politician who served in the United States House of Representatives. He was the son of John H. Hall, industrialist and inventor of the M1819 Hall rifle, the brother of Missouri Governor and Representative Willard Preble Hall and the father of Representative Uriel Sebree Hall and Medal of Honor recipient William Preble Hall.

== Early years ==
Born in Portland, Maine, on October 15, 1815, Hall moved with his family to Harpers Ferry, Virginia, at a young age and attended the local schools there. He attended Yale College, relocated to Missouri in 1840, and was admitted to its bar in 1841.

== Political career ==
Hall served as a captain in the Mexican-American War. In the 1850 United States census, he was recorded as owning four slaves. He served as judge of the Circuit Court in Missouri from 1847 to 1861 and as delegate to the Missouri Constitutional Convention in early 1861, where he advocated against secession. After the outbreak of the civil war he was appointed a United States Commissioner with powers similar to a federal magistrate judge. In the fall of 1861 he was elected as a Democrat to the 37th Congress as a replacement for John Bullock Clark, who had been expelled from Congress for taking up arms against the United States. He was elected on his own merit in 1862 and served from January 20, 1862 to March 4, 1865. He did not seek an additional term in 1864.

In 1855, Hall was the judge who presided over the trial of Celia, a 19-year-old pregnant slave woman who was on trial for the alleged murder in self-defense of her master, who had been sexually abusing her for years. Hall's personal views on slavery are not known, but he is known to have had strong unionist views. Given his position he would have been well aware of the media attention and the implications the outcome of the trial could have for Missouri and the nation. To defend Celia, Hall appointed John Jameson, a recently ordained minister who had served in congress and had been speaker of the Missouri state house. Jameson had a reputation as an excellent trial attorney. Hall also appointed two other attorneys from prominent Callaway County families to assist Jameson.

Hall's approach to the trial gives support to the view that he wished the trial procedures to be perceived as correct and fair insofar as the laws of Missouri allowed. The jury found Celia guilty and sentenced her to death. The conviction, and Hall's rulings, were affirmed by the Missouri Supreme Court. He served as a delegate to the Democratic National Convention in 1864.

== Later years ==
After his term in Congress ended, Hall returned to the practice of law. He died near Darksville, Missouri, on December 15, 1888 and was buried in a family plot.

U.S. House of Representatives
| Preceded by John Bullock Clark | Member of the U.S. House of Representatives from Missouri's 3rd congressional district 1862–1863 | Succeeded by John William Noell |
| Preceded by None (District Created after 1860 Census) | Member of the U.S. House of Representatives from Missouri's 8th congressional district 1863–1865 | Succeeded by John F. Benjamin |
