= Peter Brickey House =

Peter Brickey House may refer to:

- Peter Brickey House (Steelville, Missouri), listed on the National Register of Historic Places in Crawford County, Missouri
- Peter Brickey House (Townsend, Tennessee), listed on the National Register of Historic Places in Blount County, Tennessee
