= Darksville, Missouri =

Unincorporated community in Missouri, U.S.

Coordinates: 39°33′09″N 92°34′57″W

Darksville is an unincorporated community in northern Randolph County, in the U.S. state of Missouri. Darksville is on Missouri Route C, approximately three miles east of the Thomas Hill Reservoir dam.

== History ==
The first settlement at Darksville was made in 1856. A post office called Darksville was established in 1858, and remained in operation until 1907. The community takes its name from nearby Dark Creek.
