= Michelle Loughery =

Canadian muralist from British Columbia (born 1961)

Michelle Loughery (born 1961) is a Canadian muralist from British Columbia.

== Life and work ==
=== Early career ===
Loughery was born in the community of Michel-Natal in the Elk Valley in southeastern British Columbia, but her family was relocated to the nearby mining town of Sparwood when the community of Michel-Natal was dismantled by the provincial government in the 1970s.

=== Work ===
Loughery has created mural projects in Cuba, Missouri Route 66 Mural City, US; Vernon, British Columbia, Heritage Murals; and country music themed murals in the Country Music Capital of Canada, Merritt, British Columbia. Her 9/11 mural commissioned by the Brooklyn Fire Department is on photographic display in the Smithsonian Museum.

=== Awards ===
- BC Community Achievement Award

== Sources ==
- Sutherland, Jim. Murals Brighten Walls, Live. More Magazine. Summer 2008
- Grant, Paul. BC Artist to Paint Sept.11th Mural for NYC School. CBC News. March 17, 2003.
- British Columbian Achievement Foundation. Thirty Nine British Columbians Receive British Columbian Community Achievements Awards. March 15, 2005.
- Conkie & Kergin Law Corporation. "Loughery". December 2008.
- Merritt Herald. "On a Wall Down Under".
- Vernon Morning Star. Article.
- Canada's History. "Dan Koneszynigi".
