= Crawford County Midland Railroad =

Railroad line

The Crawford County Midland Railroad was a joint venture between the Sligo Furnace Company (Sligo) and the St. Louis and San Francisco Railway (Frisco), to bring rail service to Sligo’s Cherry Valley mines in Missouri. The 6-mile line was constructed in the 1904-1905 timeframe, and its franchises and properties were conveyed to the Frisco later in 1905.

== History ==
The Crawford County Midland Railroad Company was incorporated by Sligo on June 20, 1904, under the laws of Missouri. On August 5, 1904, Sligo concluded an agreement with the Frisco regarding creation of the railway. The line would be a standard gauge, single-line of trackage running to Sligo’s Cherry Valley iron mines located east of Steelville in Crawford County, Missouri, from a connection on the Salem Branch of the Frisco, about six miles. Both parties would finance the line—with Sligo’s share being somewhat greater—and with Frisco supplying the rails and fasteners while Sligo supplied the labor and all other materials. Road constructed started the same month, and was completed in June 1905. The line was then placed in operation by the Frisco.

The agreement provided that the ownership of the line would be vested in the Frisco after completion. So, on June 20, 1905, the railroad conveyed its franchises and properties to the Frisco.
