= Big Bend Rural School =

- U.S. National Register of Historic Places
- Location within Missouri Location within the United States
- Location: Route 19, near Steelville, Missouri
- Coordinates: 37°59′47″N 91°22′31″W
- Area: 1 acre (0.40 ha)
- Built: 1893
- Built by: Salzer, John
- NRHP reference No.: 78001643
- Added to NRHP: December 12, 1978

Big Bend Rural School is a historic one-room school building located near Steelville, Crawford County, Missouri. It was built in 1893, and is a one-story, rectangular frame building on a native sandstone foundation. It measures 20 feet by 25 feet and has a gable roof. Big Bend School closed in 1949 and is owned by the Crawford County Historical Society.

It was listed on the National Register of Historic Places in 1978.
