= Uptown Cuba Historic District =

Historic district in Missouri, United States

- U.S. National Register of Historic Places
- U.S. Historic district
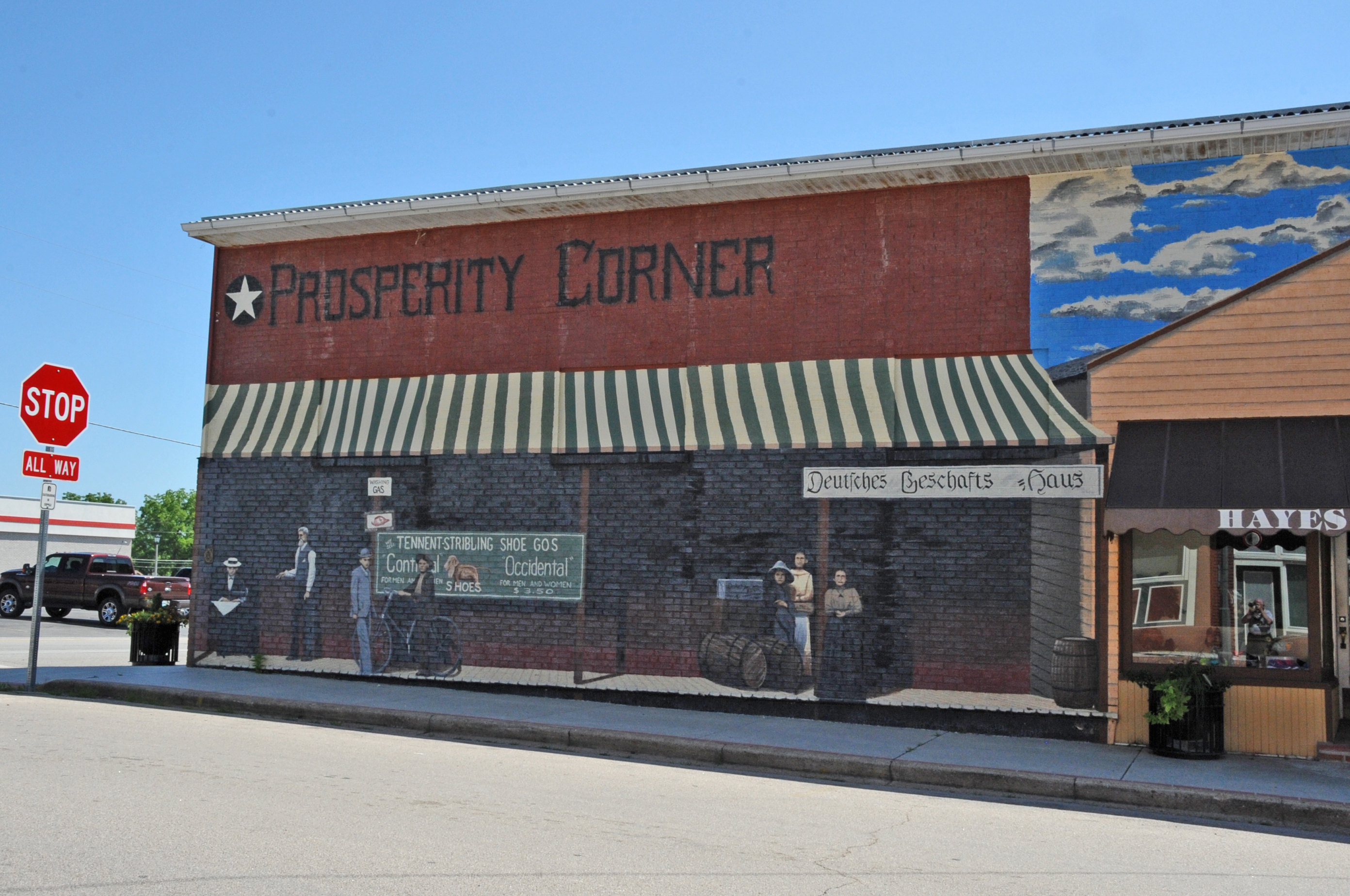
- Uptown Cuba Historic District, January 2009

- Location within Missouri Location within the United States
- Location: Roughly W. Main Ave., N. and S. Smith and S. Hickory Sts., and W. Washington Boulevard, Cuba, Missouri
- Coordinates: 38°03′40″N 91°24′24″W
- Area: 10 acres (4.0 ha)
- Built: 1880
- Architectural style: One-Part Commercial Block, Two-Part Commercial Block, Italianate
- MPS: Historic and Architectural Resources of the City of Cuba, Missouri, 1821-1963
- NRHP reference No.: 13000072
- Added to NRHP: March 13, 2013

Uptown Cuba Historic District is a national historic district located at Cuba, Crawford County, Missouri. The district encompasses 19 contributing buildings located in the central business district of Cuba. It developed between about 1880 and 1963, and includes representative examples of Italianate style architecture. Notable buildings include the former Cuba City Hall and Fire Department (1934), Bank of Cuba (c. 1896), Kinder's Big Store (c. 1885), and Hotel Grand (1897).

It was listed on the National Register of Historic Places in 2013.
