= John Manson Munro House =

Historic house in Missouri, United States

- U.S. National Register of Historic Places
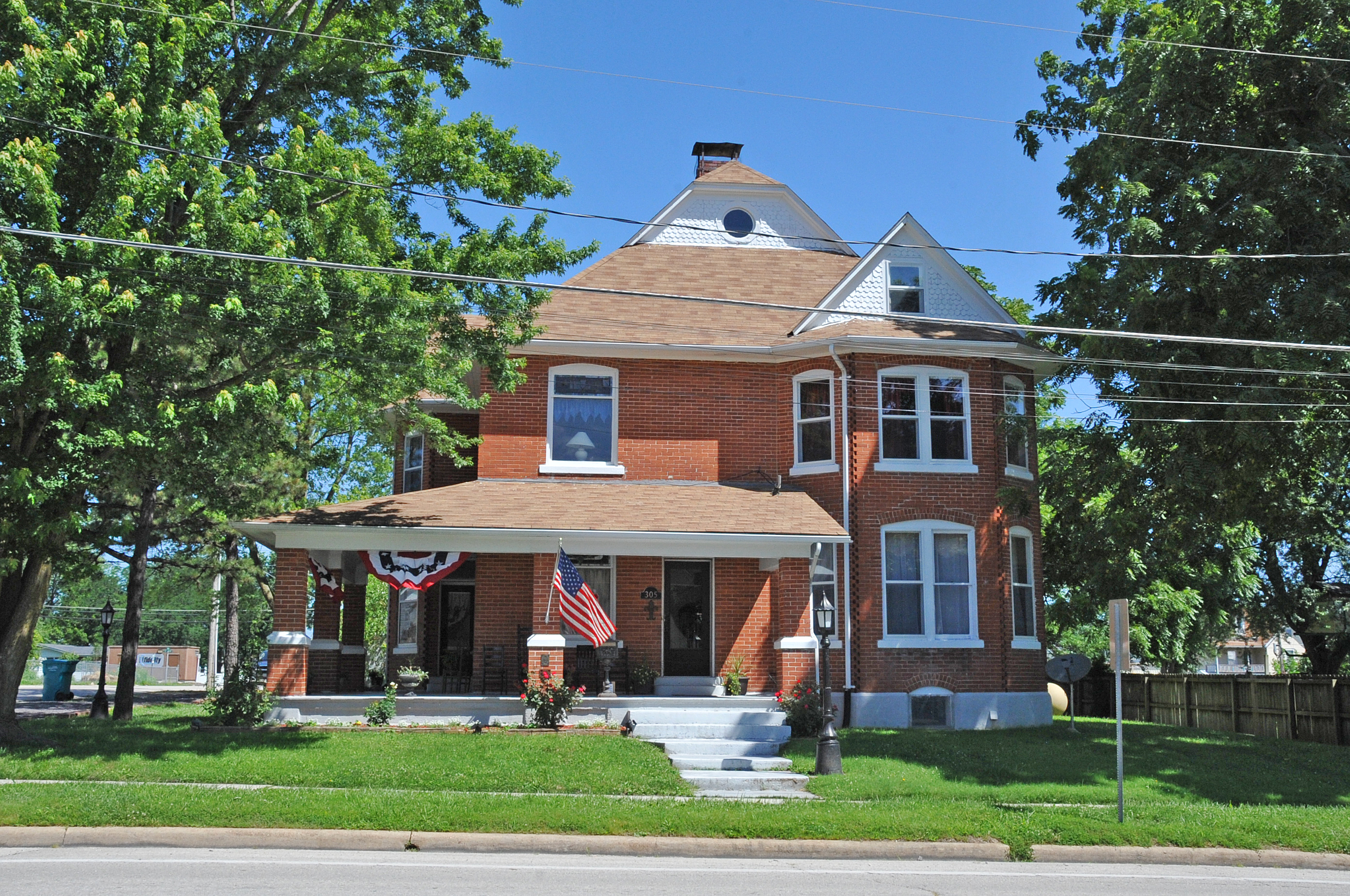
- John Manson Munro House, January 2009

- Location within Missouri Location within the United States
- Location: 401 E. Washington St., Cuba, Missouri
- Coordinates: 38°03′44″N 91°24′20″W
- Area: less than one acre
- Built: c. 1888
- Architectural style: Queen Anne
- MPS: Historic and Architectural Resources of the City of Cuba, Missouri, 1821-1963
- NRHP reference No.: 14000884
- Added to NRHP: October 29, 2014

John Manson Munro House is a historic home located at Cuba, Crawford County, Missouri. It was built about 1888, and is a 2 1/2-story, irregular shaped, Queen Anne style red brick dwelling. It has multiple projecting bays and features a wraparound porch.

It was listed on the National Register of Historic Places in 2014.
