= Cuba High School Annex =

Historic school building in Missouri, US

- U.S. National Register of Historic Places
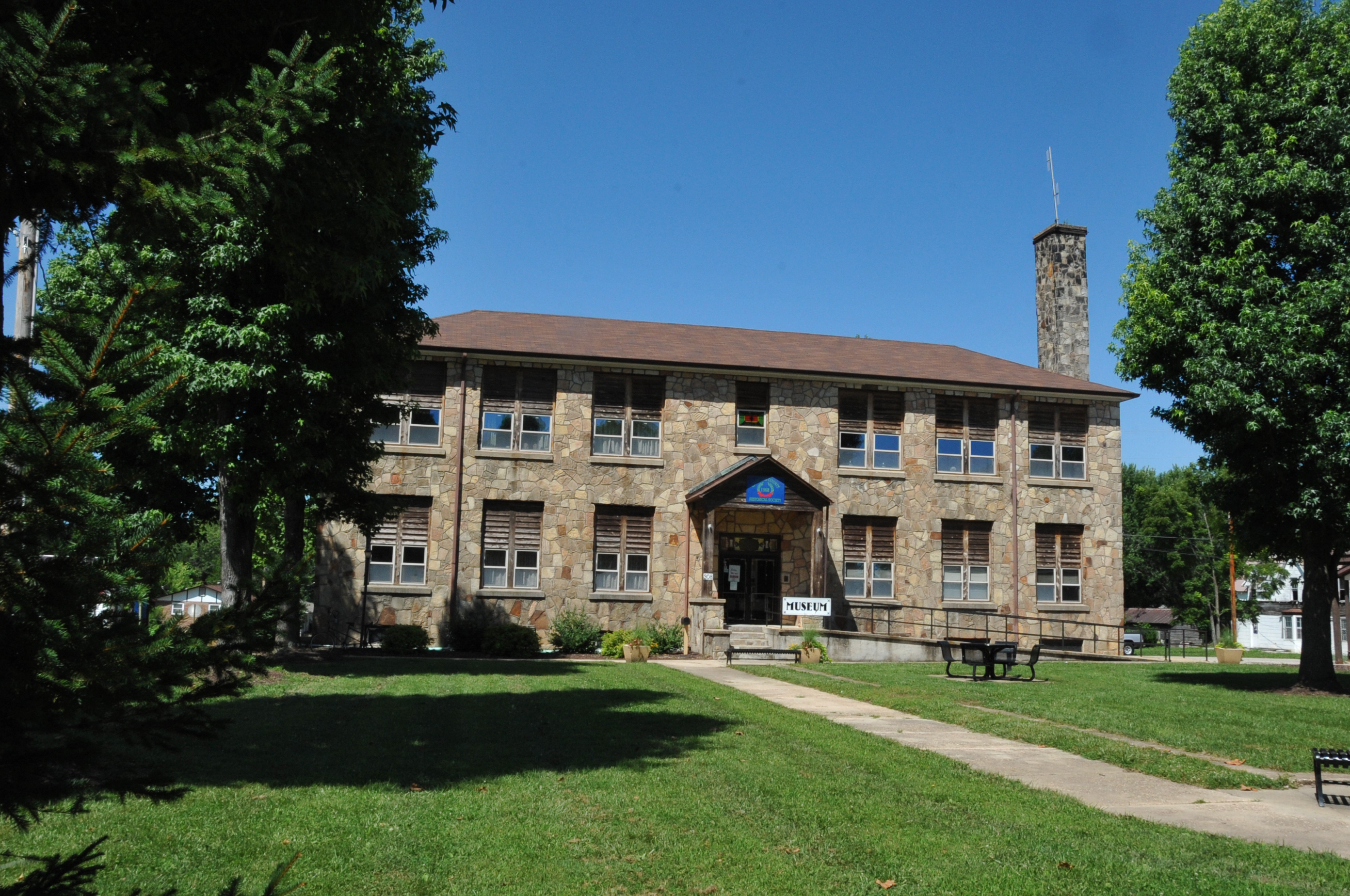
- Cuba High School Annex, January 2009

- Location within Missouri Location within the United States
- Location: 308 N. Smith St., Cuba, Missouri
- Coordinates: 38°03′49″N 91°24′31″W
- Area: less than one acre
- Built: 1934
- Architectural style: Giraffe rock school building
- MPS: Historic and Architectural Resources of the City of Cuba, Missouri, 1821-1963
- NRHP reference No.: 13000223
- Added to NRHP: May 1, 2013

Cuba High School Annex, also known as the Crawford County Historical Society Museum, is a historic school building located at Cuba, Crawford County, Missouri. It was built in 1934 with funds provided by either the Civil Works Administration or the Works Progress Administration. It is a two-story, rectangular building built on a raised basement. It measures 60 feet by 30 feet and has a hipped roof. It is finished with random ashlar native stone laid in a “giraffe” pattern with grapevine joints.

It was listed on the National Register of Historic Places in 2013.
