= Cuba Lodge No. 312 A.F. and A.M. =

- U.S. National Register of Historic Places
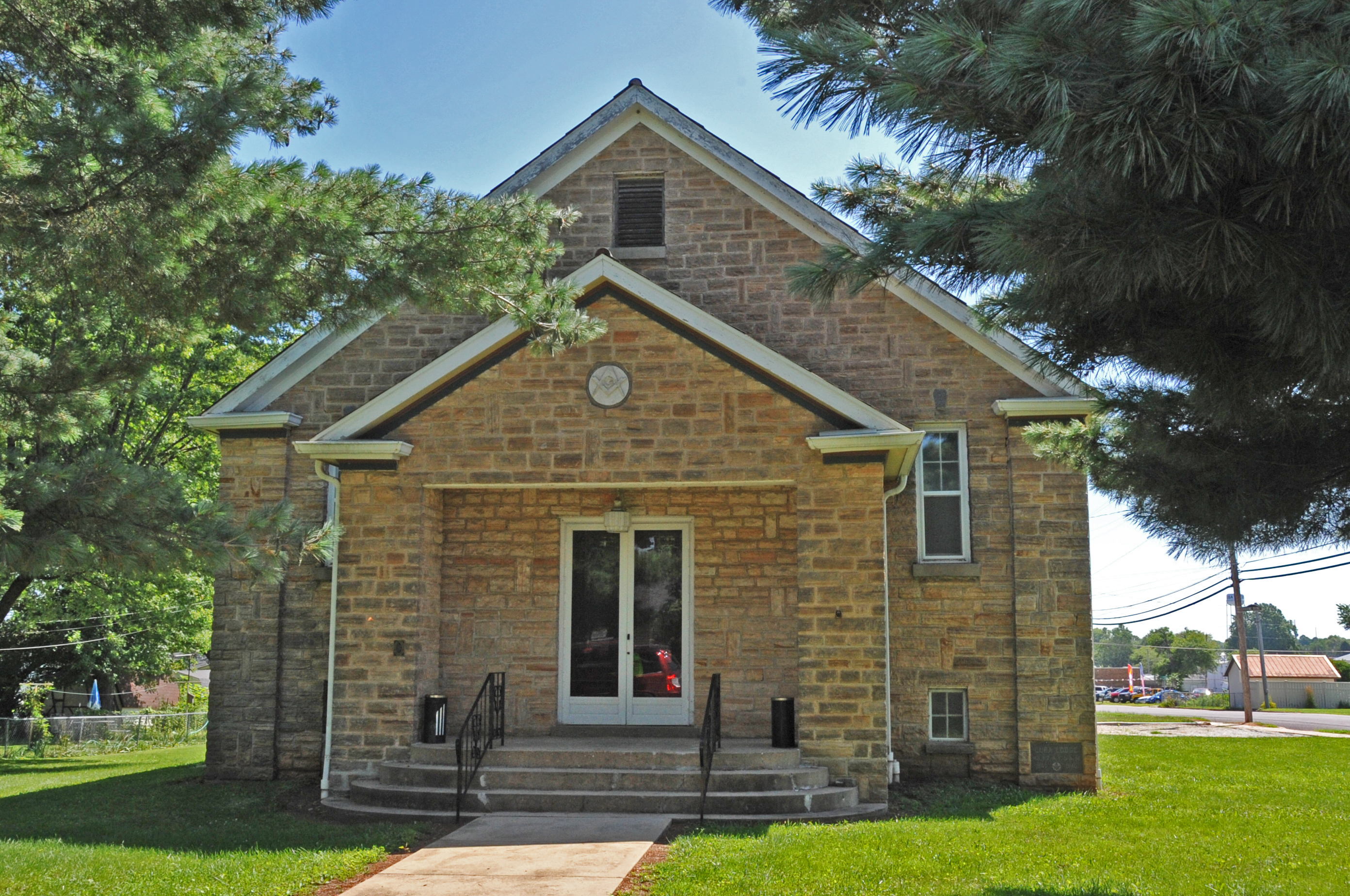
- Cuba Lodge No. 312 A.F. and A.M., January 2009

- Location within Missouri Location within the United States
- Location: Prairie St. & 300 blk. of S. Main St., Cuba, Missouri
- Coordinates: 38°03′46″N 91°24′26″W
- Area: less than one acre
- Built: 1940
- Built by: Eversen, Tom; Sharp, David R.; Stumpf, Albert
- MPS: Historic and Architectural Resources of the City of Cuba, Missouri, 1821-1963
- NRHP reference No.: 14000881
- Added to NRHP: October 29, 2014

Cuba Lodge No. 312 A.F. and A.M. is a historic Masonic lodge located at Cuba, Crawford County, Missouri. It was built in 1940, and is a one-story, rectangular building constructed of dressed, random ashlar, native sandstone. It has a front gabled-hip roof and a projecting front gable roof porch.

It was listed on the National Register of Historic Places in 2014.
