= Steelville, Missouri =

- City
- City of Steelville
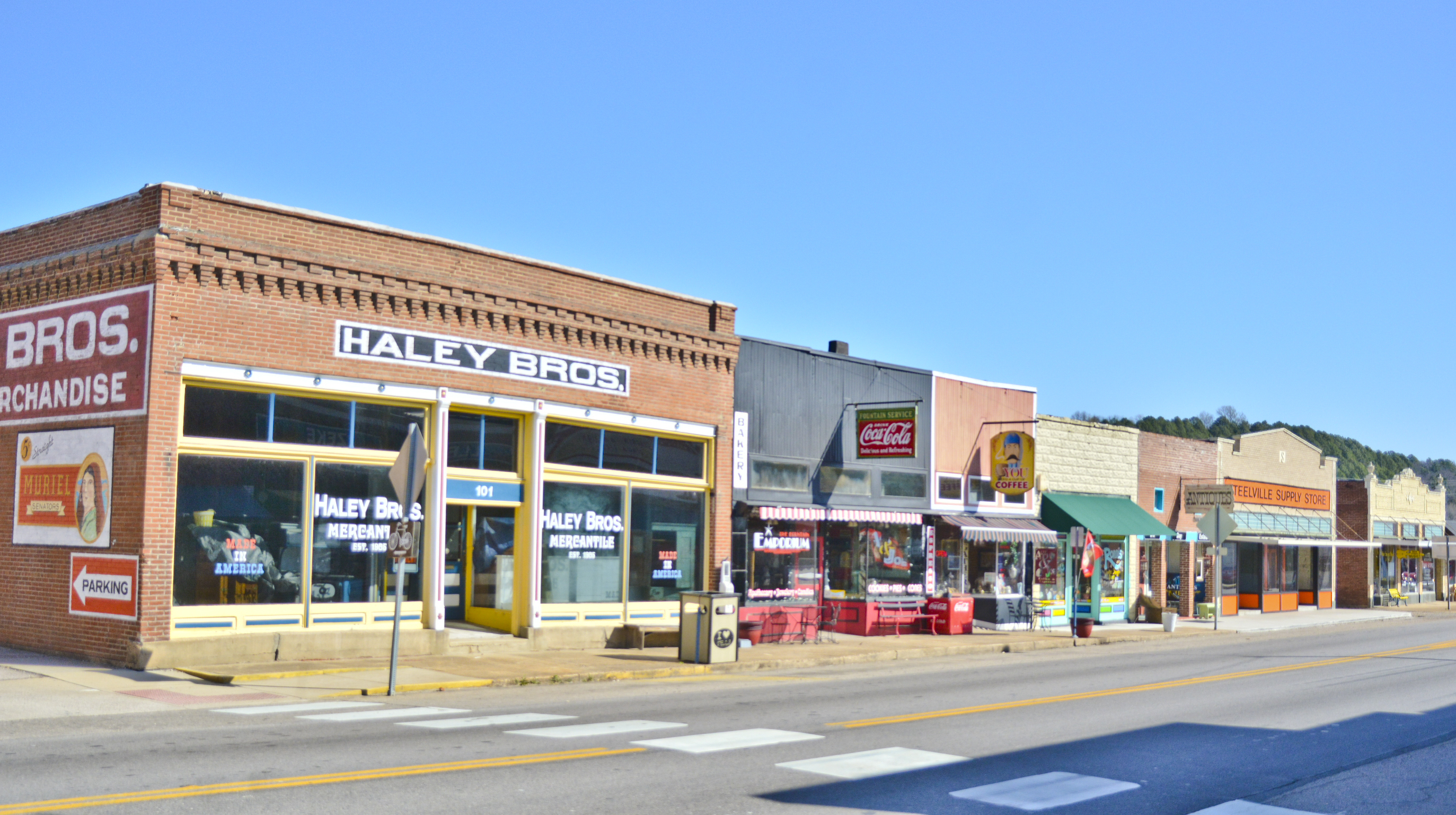
- Downtown Steelville

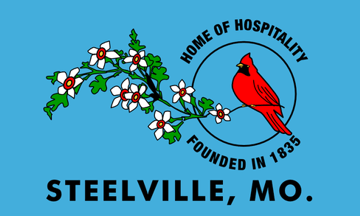
- Flag

- Location of Steelville, Missouri
- Coordinates: 37°58′11″N 91°21′19″W
- Country: United States
- State: Missouri
- County: Crawford
- Founded: 1835
- Incorporated: 1885

Government
  - Mayor: Terry Beckham
  - City Marshall: Mike Sherman
  - City Clerk: Sandy Richter
  - City Attorney: Brooks Kenagy

Area
  - Total: 2.42 sq mi (6.27 km^{2})
  - Land: 2.42 sq mi (6.27 km^{2})
  - Water: 0 sq mi (0.00 km^{2})
- Elevation: 755 ft (230 m)

Population (2020)
  - Total: 1,472
  - Density: 608.2/sq mi (234.84/km^{2})
- Time zone: UTC-6 (Central (CST))
  - Summer (DST): UTC-5 (CDT)
- ZIP code: 65565
- Area code: 573
- FIPS code: 29-70576
- GNIS feature ID: 2395962
- Website: http://steelville.com/

Steelville is a city in Crawford County, Missouri, United States. The population was 1,472 at the 2020 census. It is the county seat of Crawford County. Steelville is the hometown of Congressman Albert Reeves and Missouri State Representative Jason Chipman. The town was named after the landowner James Steel.

== History ==
Before the 1800s, the first people to live in the Steelville area were groups likely tied to the Osage nation. These peoples were driven west into what became modern-day Oklahoma. In the 1830s, the Trail of Tears, a government-sponsored forced march of the largest groups of the southeastern United States, passed through Steelville, with people primarily from the Choctaw and Cherokee tribes. They came mostly from Georgia, Alabama, Kentucky and Tennessee and were forced to relocate to Oklahoma and the West. It is believed that they stopped in Steelville around the spring to rest, bury their dead and get supplies.

The first settlers in Steelville were William Britton, who built a small grist mill along the Yadkin Creek, and James Steel, who operated a trading post and was appointed by the government as commissioner to lay out the city in 1835 – the year in which Steelville was founded. Britton remained in the area. Steel, according to census, moved northward to continue his interest in mining.

Steel purchased 40 acres of land from the government, which he later sold to the "County Court" on December 16, 1835, for $50. By this time, a little settlement had sprung up. Crawford County Court named the town Steelville as the county seat. The deed was recorded on December 18, 1835, the town was platted, and the first deeds to lots were sold for $12 each.

The Snelson-Brinker House was built outside Steelville by Levi Lane Snelson in 1834 and sold to John B. Brinker in 1837. Mary, a 14-year-old slave owned by Brinker, was hanged at Steelville in 1838 for the murder of Brinker's infant daughter. She is the youngest person to be legally executed in Missouri.

The town was incorporated as a city of the fourth class in 1885. At this time, there were 500 inhabitants. The Lebanon Lodge, Masonic, was chartered on October 14, 1846. The first tailor, Mr. Vanburg, came in town in 1844. The first hotel was owned by James Davis. In 1847, A. W. Johnson opened a blacksmith shop. Andrew Jackson opened the first post office. Doctor Dunlap was the first doctor. In 1838, J. H. Johnson opened the first saddle and harness shop.

The Steelville Normal Business Institute was originally at Vichy. It was moved to Steelville with the help of John T. Woodruff of Springfield and Professor Hayes and opened during the latter part of 1890.

The first newspaper in Steelville, Steelville Crawford Missouri, was established on May 4, 1874, by Thomas Roberts. The paper was printed in a log cabin the first time and was a Republican paper.

The Steelville Bank began operations in October 1884 under the direction of its president, G. W. Matlock. This was constructed of brick and was very strong by the standards of that time. Later, the bank was named Crawford County Farmers Bank. In 1925, bank robbers made an attempt to rob it. Most of the robbers were killed. Robbers included Basil Doman, age 21, from Mitchell, Illinois. McCellan was wounded and died after being examined. Albert Walters, age 20, from Granite City, Illinois, was the driver of the getaway car and was shot. The youngest, Leslie Reiter, age 16, from Madison, Illinois, was sent to jail. One robber was dead, two were wounded, one was taken prisoner and a fifth escaped. He was never caught or identified. The sheriff at the time was Mr. Enke. There was only one citizen wounded – A. D. Schwieder – who was walking out of the adjoining store and was shot in the leg after a shoot out with one of the robbers, whom he killed.

While this was not how the town got its name, Steelville was located in an active iron mining area. The Cherry Valley Iron Mines just east of Steelville opened in 1878, and had produced 736,800 tons of ore between 1878 and 1910. The mines even created their own railway, the Crawford County Midland Railroad, to link with the St. Louis and San Francisco Railway to provide needed haulage services. However, iron production was more or less exhausted by 1924.

The Big Bend Rural School and Snelson-Brinker House are listed on the National Register of Historic Places.

== Geography ==
Steelville is located in west central Crawford County at the intersection of routes 8 and 19. Cuba lies 7.5 miles to the north and Cherryville is 8.5 miles to the south.

According to the United States Census Bureau, the city has a total area of 2.42 square miles (6.27 km^{2}), all land.

== Demographics ==
Historical population
| Census | Pop. | Note | %± |
|---|---|---|---|
| 1860 | 226 | | — |
| 1870 | 232 | | 2.7% |
| 1880 | 410 | | 76.7% |
| 1890 | 591 | | 44.1% |
| 1900 | 686 | | 16.1% |
| 1910 | 773 | | 12.7% |
| 1920 | 767 | | −0.8% |
| 1930 | 854 | | 11.3% |
| 1940 | 1,013 | | 18.6% |
| 1950 | 1,157 | | 14.2% |
| 1960 | 1,127 | | −2.6% |
| 1970 | 1,392 | | 23.5% |
| 1980 | 1,470 | | 5.6% |
| 1990 | 1,465 | | −0.3% |
| 2000 | 1,429 | | −2.5% |
| 2010 | 1,642 | | 14.9% |
| 2020 | 1,472 | | −10.4% |
U.S. Decennial Census

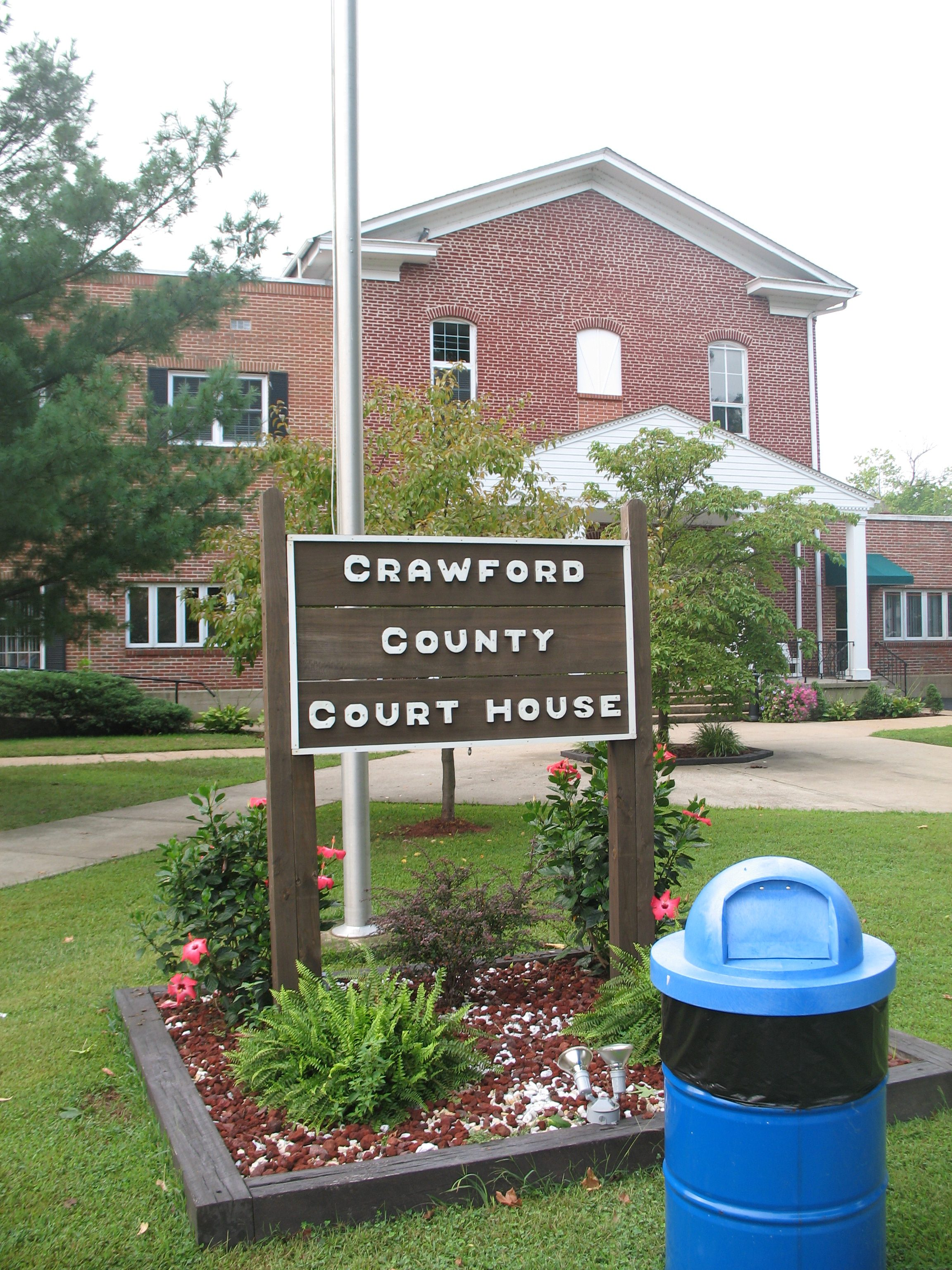
Crawford County Courthouse

=== 2010 census ===
At the 2010 census, there were 1,642 people, 638 households and 345 families living in the city. The population density was 678.5 per square mile (262.0/km^{2}). There were 753 housing units at an average density of 311.2 per square mile (120.2/km^{2}). The racial make-up was 90.10% White, 5.97% Black or African American, 1.16% Native American, 4.43% Asian, 0.55% from other races, and 0.79% from two or more races. Hispanic or Latino of any race were 1.77% of the population.

There were 638 households, of which 32.8% had children under the age of 18 living with them, 34.0% were married couples living together, 13.6% had a female householder with no husband present, 6.4% had a male householder with no wife present, and 45.9% were non-families. 37.6% of all households were made up of individuals, and 19.1% had someone living alone who was 65 years of age or older. The average household size was 2.35 and the average family size was 3.12.

The median age was 36.8 years. 24.2% of residents were under the age of 18; 9.1% were between the ages of 18 and 24; 26.4% were from 25 to 44; 21.1% were from 45 to 64; and 19.2% were 65 years of age or older. The gender make-up of the city was 47.3% male and 52.7% female.

=== 2000 census ===
At the 2000 census, there were 1,429 people, 616 households and 349 families living in the city. The population density was 548.8 per square mile (211.9/km^{2}). There were 724 housing units at an average density of 278.0 per square mile (107.3/km^{2}). The racial make-up was 99.09% White, 0.14% Native American, 0.42% Pacific Islander, 0.07% from other races, and 0.28% from two or more races. Hispanic or Latino of any race were 0.07% of the population.

There were 616 households, of which 25.8% had children under the age of 18 living with them, 41.2% were married couples living together, 13.6% had a female householder with no husband present, and 43.3% were non-families. 37.3% of all households were made up of individuals, and 20.8% had someone living alone who was 65 years of age or older. The average household size was 2.18 and the average family size was 2.88.

24.4% Of the population were under the age of 18, 7.9% from 18 to 24, 24.6% from 25 to 44, 19.4% from 45 to 64, and 23.7% who were 65 years of age or older. The median age was 39 years. For every 100 females, there were 74.3 males. For every 100 females age 18 and over, there were 68.2 males.

The median household income was $19,596 and the median family income was $26,765. Males had a median income of $23,913 and females $16,250. The per capita income was $12,550. About 20.2% of families and 25.5% of the population were below the poverty line, including 36.0% of those under age 18 and 17.0% of those age 65 or over.

== Education ==
Steelville R-III School District covers the entirety of the city of Steelville, as well as the surrounding area. Steelville Elementary has 401 students grades PK, K-4. Steelville Middle School has 316 students grades 5–8. Steelville High School has 253 students grades 9–12.

Steelville has a public library, a branch of the Crawford County Library District.

== Arts and culture ==
Steelville is the self-proclaimed "Floating Capital of Missouri". The Meramec River passes just to the north of the city.
