= Hotel Cuba =

Historic building in Cuba, Missouri, US

- U.S. National Register of Historic Places
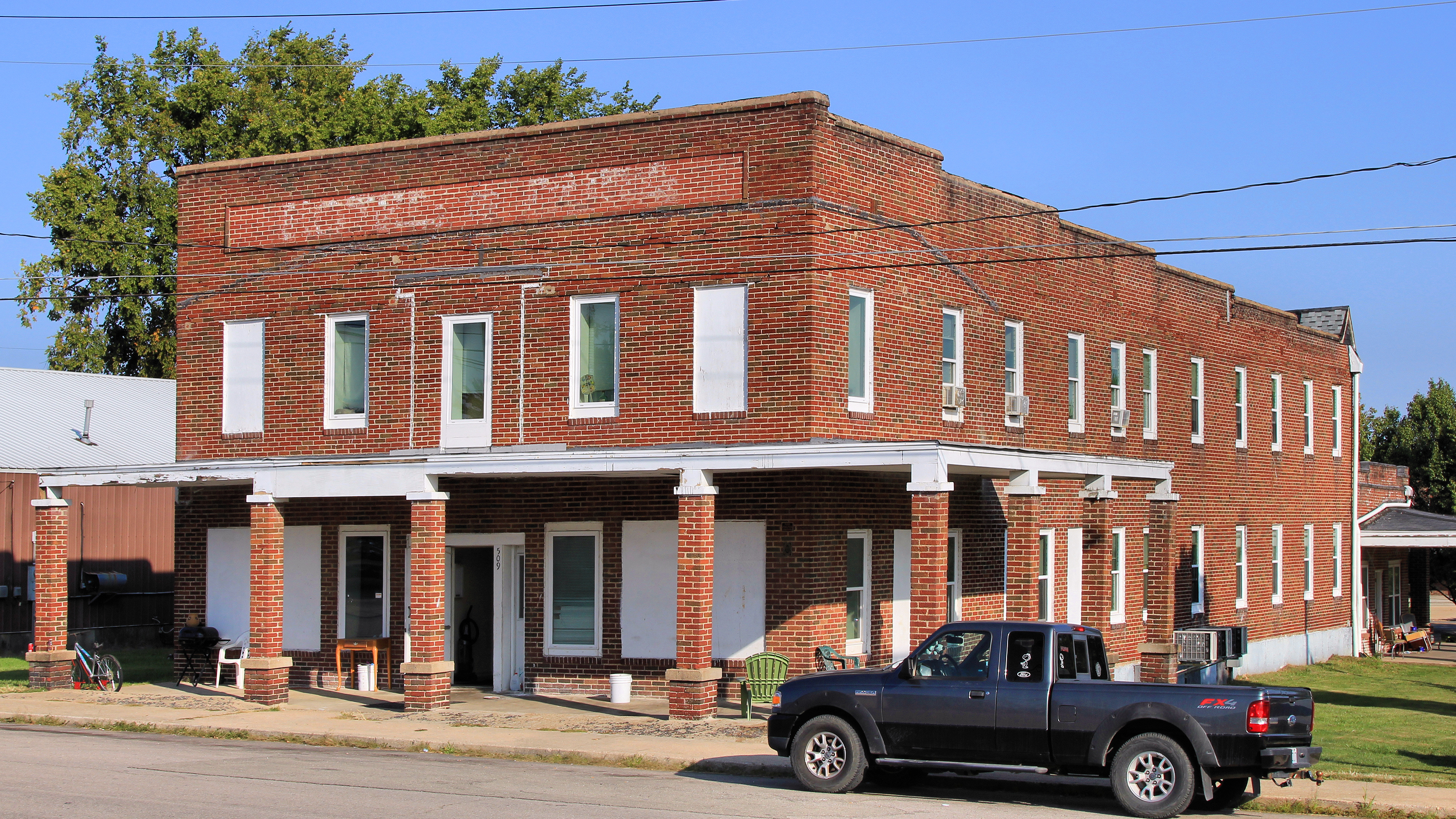

- Location within Missouri Location within the United States
- Location: 509 E. Main St., Cuba, Missouri
- Coordinates: 38°03′48″N 91°23′57″W
- Area: less than one acre
- Built: 1915, 1926
- Architectural style: Late 19th and Early 20th Century American Movements
- MPS: Historic and Architectural Resources of the City of Cuba, Missouri, 1821-1963
- NRHP reference No.: 14000883
- Added to NRHP: October 29, 2014

Hotel Cuba is a historic hotel building located at Cuba, Crawford County, Missouri. It was built in 1915, and is a one-story, rectangular, red brick building. A one-story addition was built in 1926. It has a front parapet roof and features a full-width flat-roof porch on the front façade.

It was listed on the National Register of Historic Places in 2014.
