= Annice (slave) =

American convicted murderer

- Died: August 23, 1828; Missouri, U.S.
- Cause of death: Execution by hanging
- Occupation: Slave
- Status: Executed
- Motive: Unknown (possibly mercy killing and or revenge)
- Conviction: Murder (5 counts)
- Penalty: Death

Details
- Victims: 5
- Country: United States
- State: Missouri
- Date apprehended: July 27, 1828

Annice (died August 23, 1828) was the first enslaved woman known to have been executed in Missouri. She was hanged for the murders of five slave children, including two of her own.

== Incident ==
Annice was enslaved in Clay County, Missouri by Jeremiah Prior. On July 27, 1828, she was indicted for the murders of five slave children also owned by Prior – Ann, Billy, Nancy, Nelly, and Phebe. Billy (aged five) and Nancy (aged two) were Annice's own children, but the parentages and ages of the others were not identified.

According to the indictment, the children were pushed "into a certain collection of water of the depth of five feet and there choaked [sic], suffocated and drowned, of which they instantly died". Annice was given a jury trial and a defense attorney, but was found guilty. She was publicly hanged by Sheriff Shubael Allen the following month, at the county seat of Liberty.

Annice's hanging was the first legal execution in Clay County (established 1822), and she is the first enslaved woman known to have been executed in Missouri. She is also the second recorded slave to be executed in Missouri (the first that is known of being an enslaved man named Luke, convicted of stabbing two years earlier in Cooper County), although in the words of writer Harriet Frazier, "the second that we know about was almost certainly not the second, probably not the third or the fourth."

Annice is the only slave known to have been executed for infanticide in Missouri, although an absence of early territorial records means there may have been others that were not recorded. Sometimes enslaved women were known to have killed their own children out of a desire to spare them a lifetime of subjugation. Frazier notes that although she went to trial, records do not contain a statement from Annice herself, and as such "her motivation can only be surmised", although Frazier speculates that it was most likely "the same as Missouri's many slave mothers who either attempted or accomplished the murder of their offspring."

There has been some speculation that Annice was the mother of another female slave of the same name, who was lynched in Clay County in 1850 for the attempted murder of her owner. However, there is no direct evidence linking the two other than their shared names and location.

== Memorial plaque ==
In 1976, the Clay County Bicentennial Committee erected a memorial plaque at Tryst Falls (near Excelsior Springs), which read "Water falls into basin where a Negro slave drowned her children in 1828 and was hung for the deed". This plaque remained until at least 1994, but was later replaced with one simply reading "Clay County Historical Society Historical Landmark".

== See also ==
- History of slavery in Missouri
- Mary (slave), youngest person executed in Missouri
- State of Missouri v. Celia, a Slave
- Suicide, infanticide, and self-mutilation by slaves in the United States
