= Cuba, Missouri =

City in Crawford County, Missouri, United States

Cuba
- City
- City of Cuba
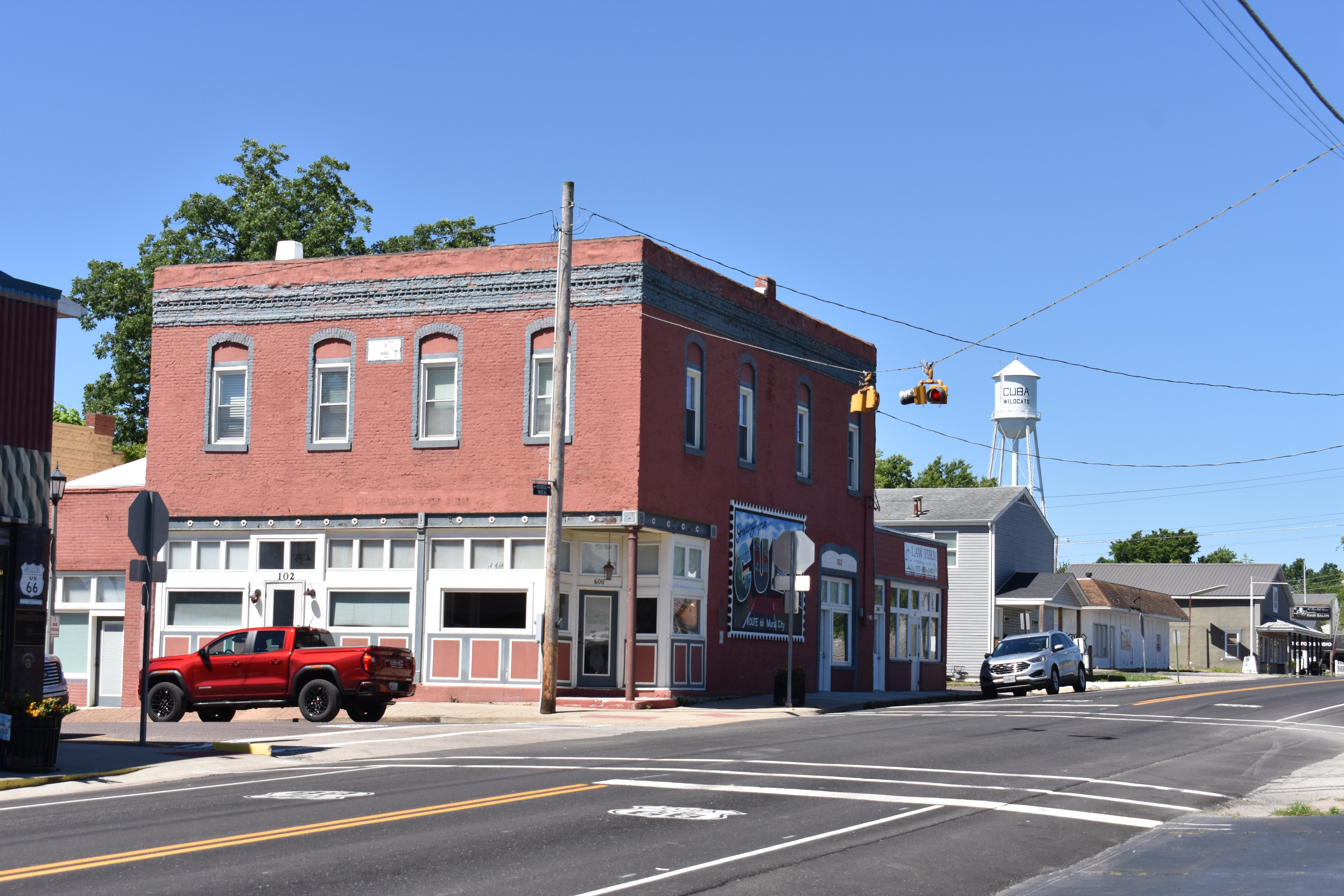
- Nickname: Route 66 Mural City
- Motto: Where History Meets Art
- Location of Cuba, Missouri
- Coordinates: 38°04′02″N 91°24′21″W
- Country: United States
- State: Missouri
- County: Crawford
- Founded: 1857
- Named for: The island of Cuba

Government
  - Mayor: Pitts Lesesne
  - City Clerk: Lainie Garbo

Area
  - Total: 3.19 sq mi (8.27 km^{2})
  - Land: 3.19 sq mi (8.27 km^{2})
  - Water: 0 sq mi (0.00 km^{2})
- Elevation: 1,017 ft (310 m)

Population (2020)
  - Total: 3,181
  - Density: 996.2/sq mi (384.65/km^{2})
- Time zone: UTC-6 (Central (CST))
  - Summer (DST): UTC-5 (CDT)
- ZIP code: 65453
- Area code: 573
- FIPS code: 29-17668
- GNIS feature ID: 2393690
- Website: www.cityofcubamo.gov

Cuba is a city in Crawford County, Missouri, United States. As of the 2020 census, Cuba had a population of 3,181. Cuba is the largest city in Crawford County.

== History ==
Cuba was platted in 1857 when it was certain the railroad would be extended to that point. It was named after the island of Cuba.

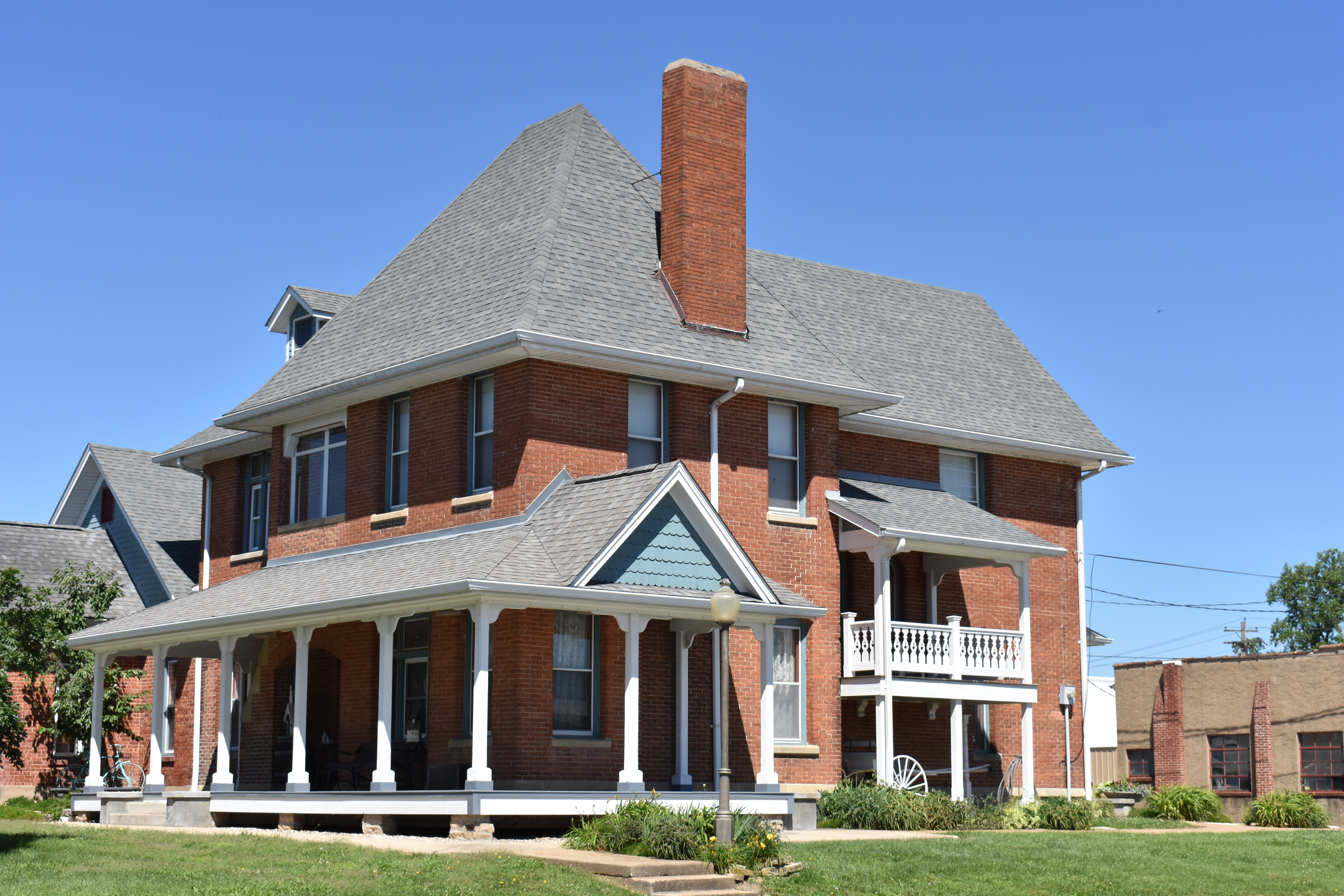
The Wallace House

President Harry S. Truman visited Cuba during a tour of U.S. Route 66. He surveyed the property that would eventually become Indian Hills Lake. Indian Hills Lake was originally known as "Indian Head Lake" because the skull of a Native American was found during excavation.

Bette Davis and Amelia Earhart also visited the town. Their visits are commemorated in the Viva Cuba Mural Project.

Cuba was designated as the Route 66 Mural City by the Missouri legislature in recognition of Viva Cuba's Outdoor Mural Project. The beautification group consulted with Michelle Loughery, a Canadian muralist who helped create the vision and two of the murals. The group commissioned twelve outdoor murals along the Route 66 corridor. Interstate 44 now runs through Cuba.

Cuba was also the site of the first Adopt a Highway program in Missouri.

The Cuba City Jail, Cuba High School Annex, Cuba Lodge No. 312 A.F. and A.M., George B. Hamilton House, Hotel Cuba, John Manson Munro House, Uptown Cuba Historic District, and Wagon Wheel Motel, Cafe and Station are listed on the National Register of Historic Places.

== Geography ==
Cuba is located on Missouri Route 19 approximately seven miles northeast of Steelville. I-44 passes the north side of the town.

According to the United States Census Bureau, the city has a total area of 3.20 square miles (8.29 km^{2}), all land.

== Demographics ==
Historical population
Census	Pop.	Note	%±
1880	374		—
1890	497		32.9%
1900	552		11.1%
1910	619		12.1%
1920	704		13.7%
1930	814		15.6%
1940	1,033		26.9%
1950	1,301		25.9%
1960	1,672		28.5%
1970	2,070		23.8%
1980	2,120		2.4%
1990	2,537		19.7%
2000	3,230		27.3%
2010	3,356		3.9%
2020	3,181		−5.2%
U.S. Decennial Census

=== 2020 census ===
As of the 2020 census, Cuba had a population of 3,181. The median age was 40.2 years. 22.9% of residents were under the age of 18 and 19.4% of residents were 65 years of age or older. For every 100 females there were 88.9 males, and for every 100 females age 18 and over there were 87.1 males age 18 and over.

0.0% of residents lived in urban areas, while 100.0% lived in rural areas.

There were 1,370 households in Cuba, of which 28.0% had children under the age of 18 living in them. Of all households, 34.1% were married-couple households, 20.7% were households with a male householder and no spouse or partner present, and 36.0% were households with a female householder and no spouse or partner present. About 37.1% of all households were made up of individuals and 15.7% had someone living alone who was 65 years of age or older.

There were 1,539 housing units, of which 11.0% were vacant. The homeowner vacancy rate was 2.3% and the rental vacancy rate was 10.1%.

Racial composition as of the 2020 census
Race	Number	Percent
White	2,872	90.3%
Black or African American	26	0.8%
American Indian and Alaska Native	31	1.0%
Asian	6	0.2%
Native Hawaiian and Other Pacific Islander	0	0.0%
Some other race	74	2.3%
Two or more races	172	5.4%
Hispanic or Latino (of any race)	151	4.7%

=== 2010 census ===
As of the census of 2010, there were 3,356 people, 1,385 households, and 816 families living in the city. The population density was 1,048.8 inhabitants per square mile (404.9/km^{2}). There were 1,542 housing units at an average density of 481.9 per square mile (186.1/km^{2}). The racial makeup of the city was 95.95% White, 0.27% Black or African American, 0.66% Native American, 0.18% Asian, 1.49% from other races, and 1.46% from two or more races. Hispanic or Latino of any race were 3.40% of the population.

There were 1,385 households, of which 31.9% had children under the age of 18 living with them, 39.1% were married couples living together, 15.3% had a female householder with no husband present, 4.5% had a male householder with no wife present, and 41.1% were non-families. 35.0% of all households were made up of individuals, and 13.8% had someone living alone who was 65 years of age or older. The average household size was 2.37 and the average family size was 3.03.

The median age in the city was 35.5 years. 26.1% of residents were under the age of 18; 9.7% were between the ages of 18 and 24; 24.2% were from 25 to 44; 23.3% were from 45 to 64; and 16.6% were 65 years of age or older. The gender makeup of the city was 46.7% male and 53.3% female.

=== 2000 census ===
As of the census of 2000, there were 3,230 people, 1,295 households, and 831 families living in the city. The population density was 1,095.4 inhabitants per square mile (422.9/km^{2}). There were 1,414 housing units at an average density of 479.5 per square mile (185.1/km^{2}). The racial makeup of the city was 97.68% White, 0.50% African American, 0.34% Native American, 0.31% Asian, 0.28% from other races, and 0.90% from two or more races. Hispanic or Latino of any race were 1.21% of the population.

There were 1,295 households, out of which 34.4% had children under the age of 18 living with them, 47.7% were married couples living together, 13.2% had a female householder with no husband present, and 35.8% were non-families. 31.9% of all households were made up of individuals, and 16.6% had someone living alone who was 65 years of age or older. The average household size was 2.40 and the average family size was 3.02.

In the city, the population was spread out, with 27.2% under the age of 18, 8.8% from 18 to 24, 26.5% from 25 to 44, 18.1% from 45 to 64, and 19.4% who were 65 years of age or older. The median age was 37 years. For every 100 females, there were 88.1 males. For every 100 females age 18 and over, there were 79.4 males.

The median income for a household in the city was $24,127, and the median income for a family was $30,069. Males had a median income of $24,348 versus $17,958 for females. The per capita income for the city was $12,665. About 16.3% of families and 20.1% of the population were below the poverty line, including 28.7% of those under age 18 and 13.1% of those age 65 or over.

== Arts and culture ==
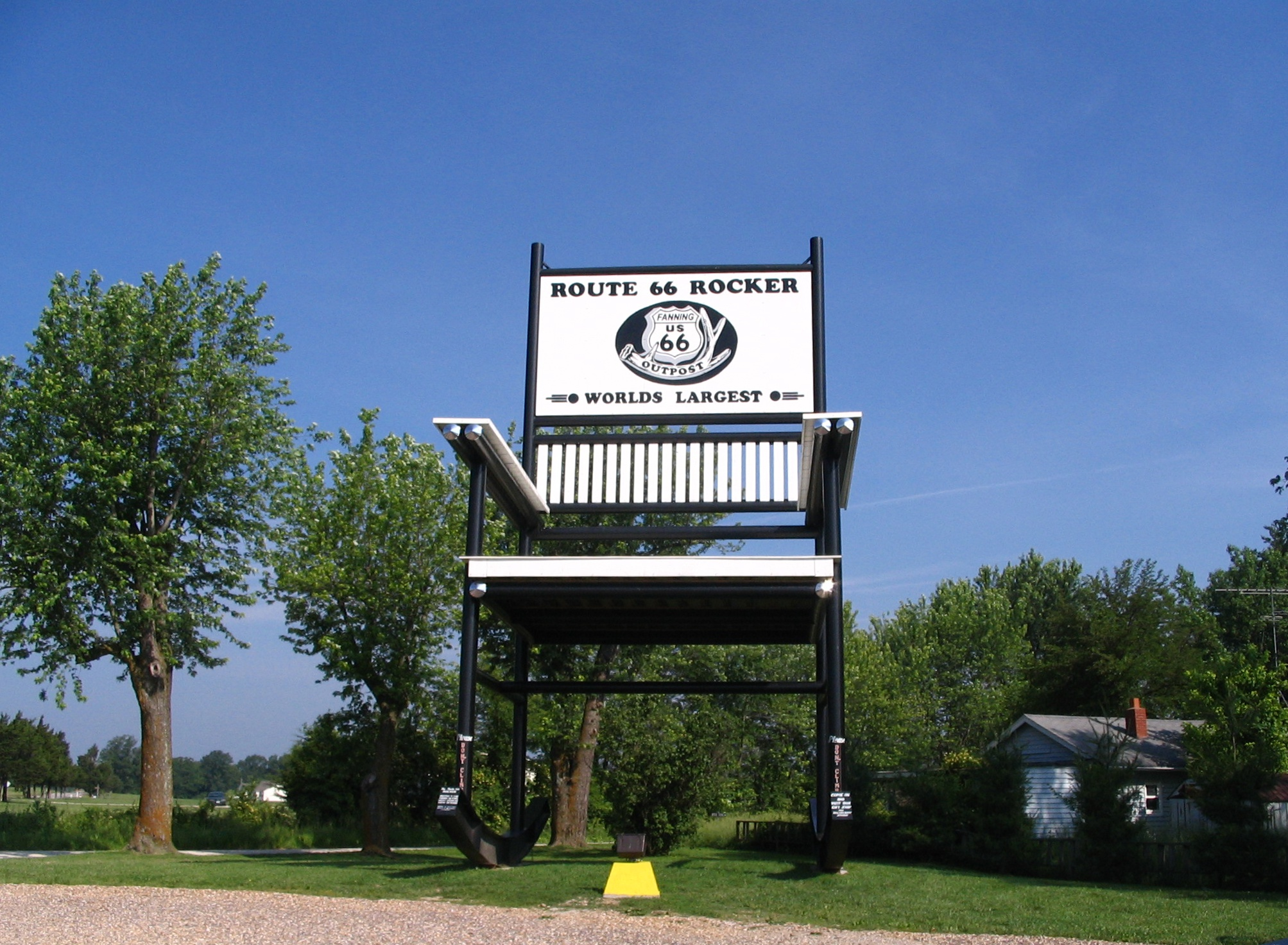
World's largest rocking chair, located just west of Cuba.

The Wagon Wheel Motel is a historic landmark and has been a presence on Route 66 since the 1930s. The guest cottages and old Wagon Wheel Cafe building underwent renovations beginning in 2009.

Cuba is home to the Crawford County History Museum. The Veterans Memorial, with almost 1000 names of veterans, sits in front of the museum on Smith Street.

Four miles west of Cuba on Route 66 is the site of what was previously the World's Largest Rocking Chair. The chair is 42' high and draws many Route 66 travelers to take photos.

== Education ==
It is in the Crawford County R-II School District. The Crawford County R-II school district in 2000 had 1,426 students. The high school had 451 students, the middle school had 454, and the elementary school had 521. Renovation of the elementary and middle school facilities and the construction of a new high school, all of which cost more than $4 million, was recently completed. The school district has received full accreditation of the North Central Association of Secondary Schools and Colleges.

The Holy Cross Catholic School taught grades PK-8, until its closure in May of 2025.

Cuba has a public library, a branch of the Crawford County Library District.

== Notable people ==
- Jake Collier-Former UFC Heavyweight Fighter
- Jason Crow - Edward R. Murrow Award and Emmy winning photojournalist.

== See also ==
- List of municipalities in Missouri
