= John Jameson (politician) =

American politician (1802–1857)

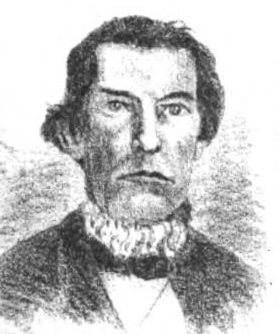

Member of the U.S. House of Representatives from Missouri
- In office March 4, 1847 – March 3, 1849
- Preceded by: New district
- Succeeded by: William Van Ness Bay
- Constituency: 2nd district
- In office March 4, 1843 – March 3, 1845
- Preceded by: John C. Edwards
- Succeeded by: Sterling Price
- Constituency: at-large
- In office December 12, 1839 – March 3, 1841
- Preceded by: Albert Galliton Harrison
- Succeeded by: John C. Edwards
- Constituency: at-large

Personal details
- Born: March 6, 1802 Mount Sterling, Kentucky
- Died: January 24, 1857 (aged 54) Fulton, Missouri
- Party: Democratic
- Relations: Richard Reid Rogers (grandson)

John Jameson (March 6, 1802 – January 24, 1857) was an American farmer, lawyer, and politician from Fulton, Missouri. He represented Missouri in the US House of Representatives.

== Early life ==
Jameson was born in Mount Sterling, Kentucky in Montgomery County, Kentucky on March 6, 1802. He attended the common schools, moved to Callaway County, Missouri in 1825, studied law, was admitted to the bar in 1826 and commenced practice in Fulton, Missouri. He owned slaves.

== Career ==
He served as a captain in the militia during the Black Hawk War between April and August 1832. He held several local offices including member of the Missouri House of Representatives from 1830 to 1836 and the Speaker of the Missouri House of Representatives from 1834 to 1836.

Jameson was elected as a Democrat to the 26th Congress and filled the vacancy that had been caused by the death of Albert G. Harrison. Serving from December 12, 1839, to March 3, 1841, he was not a candidate for renomination in 1840. In 1842, Jameson was again elected to the House and served the 28th Congress from March 1843 to March 3, 1845. He was not a candidate for renomination in 1844. Jameson was again elected to the 30th Congress and served from March 4, 1847, to March 3, 1849. He was not a candidate for renomination in 1848.

== Later life ==
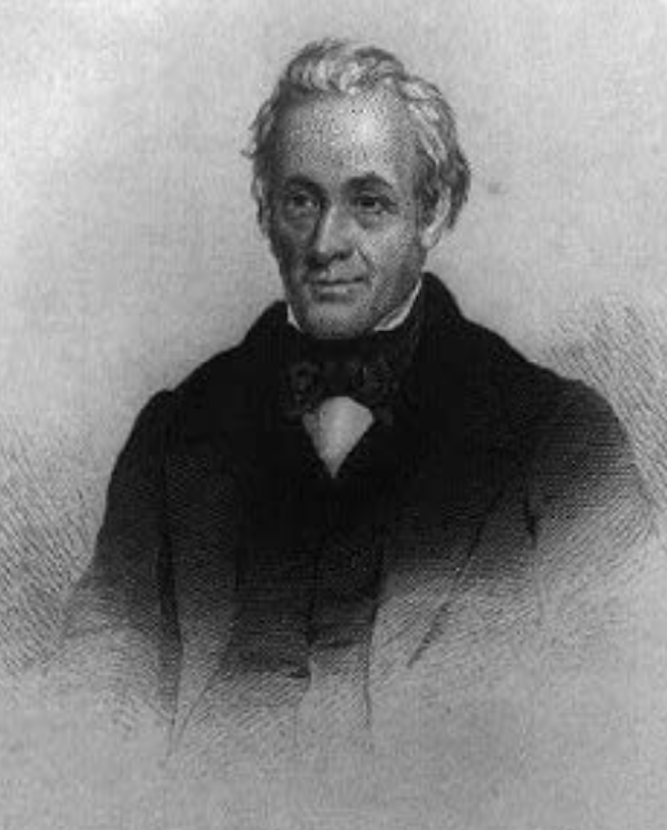
John Jameson, an engraving by Francis Croll, courtesy of the National Galleries of Scotland

In 1855, as a lawyer, Jameson led the defense of a slave named Celia in what became an influential trial of a slave. He based his unsuccessful "defense on the premise that under Missouri law Celia possessed the same right to use deadly force to defend her honor as did white women."

In his later years, Jameson was a farmer and was ordained as a minister in the Christian Church.

== Personal life ==
Jameson was married to Susan A. Harris (1814–1890), a daughter of Tyre Harris and Sarah (née Garland) Harris. Together, they were the parents of:

- John Harris Jameson (1838–1902), who married Mary E. Herndon (1842–1927), a daughter of Edward S. Herndon, in 1861.
- Elizabeth Jameson (1840–1902), who married Benjamin F. Rogers. After his death, she married Judge Richard Reid.
- Ollie Tom Jameson (1842–1863), who died unmarried.
- Sarah Tyre Jameson (1843–1863), who died two weeks before she was to marry Richard Reid of Montgomery County, Kentucky. Ten years after her death, Reid married her sister, Elizabeth.
- Malinda R. Jameson (1845–1909), who married Clare O. Atkinson (1838–1919), a director of the Callaway Bank in Fulton.

Jameson died in Fulton, Missouri on January 24, 1857, and was interred in the Jameson family cemetery near Fulton.

=== Descendants ===
Through his daughter Elizabeth, he was a grandfather of Richard Reid Rogers, the Military Governor of Panama Canal Zone under President Theodore Roosevelt. Richard's daughter, Elizabeth Reid Rogers, married into the German nobility and the House of Hesse, by marrying Prince Christian of Hesse-Philippsthal-Barchfeld, a son of Prince William, in 1915 and being titled Baroness von Barchfeld.

=== Ancestors ===
His great uncle was Col. John Jameson and he was a first cousin (thrice removed) to George Washington.

U.S. House of Representatives
Preceded by Albert Galliton Harrison	Member of the U.S. House of Representatives from Missouri's at-large congressional district 1839–1841	Succeeded by John C. Edwards
Preceded by John C. Edwards	Member of the U.S. House of Representatives from Missouri's at-large congressional district 1843–1845	Succeeded by Sterling Price
Preceded by None (New district)	Member of the U.S. House of Representatives from Missouri's 2nd congressional district 1847–1849	Succeeded by William Van Ness Bay
