= George B. Hamilton House =

Historic house in Missouri, United States

- U.S. National Register of Historic Places
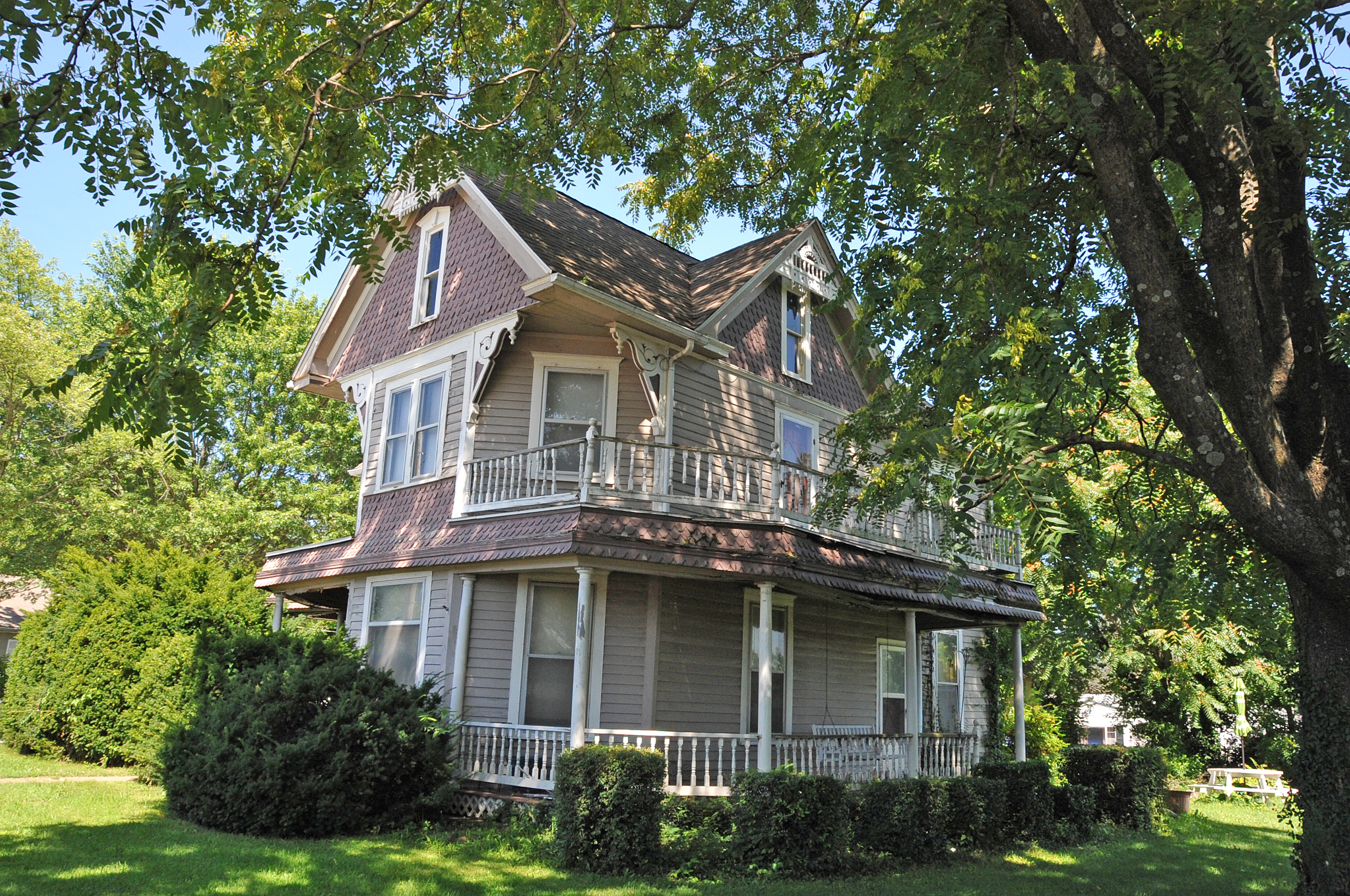
- George B. Hamilton House, January 2009

- Location within Missouri Location within the United States
- Location: 401 E. Washington St., Cuba, Missouri
- Coordinates: 38°03′48″N 91°24′04″W
- Area: less than one acre
- Built: c. 1896
- Architectural style: Queen Anne
- MPS: Historic and Architectural Resources of the City of Cuba, Missouri, 1821-1963
- NRHP reference No.: 14000882
- Added to NRHP: October 29, 2014

George B. Hamilton House is a historic home located in the city of Cuba in Crawford County, Missouri. It was built around 1896, and is a 2 1/2-story, irregular shaped, Queen Anne style frame dwelling with Eastlake movement detailing. It has multiple projecting bays and features fishscale shingles and elaborate spindlework in gable ends and porch balconies.

It was listed on the National Register of Historic Places in 2014.
