= Wagon Wheel Motel, Café and Station =

Tourist stop in Cuba, Missouri

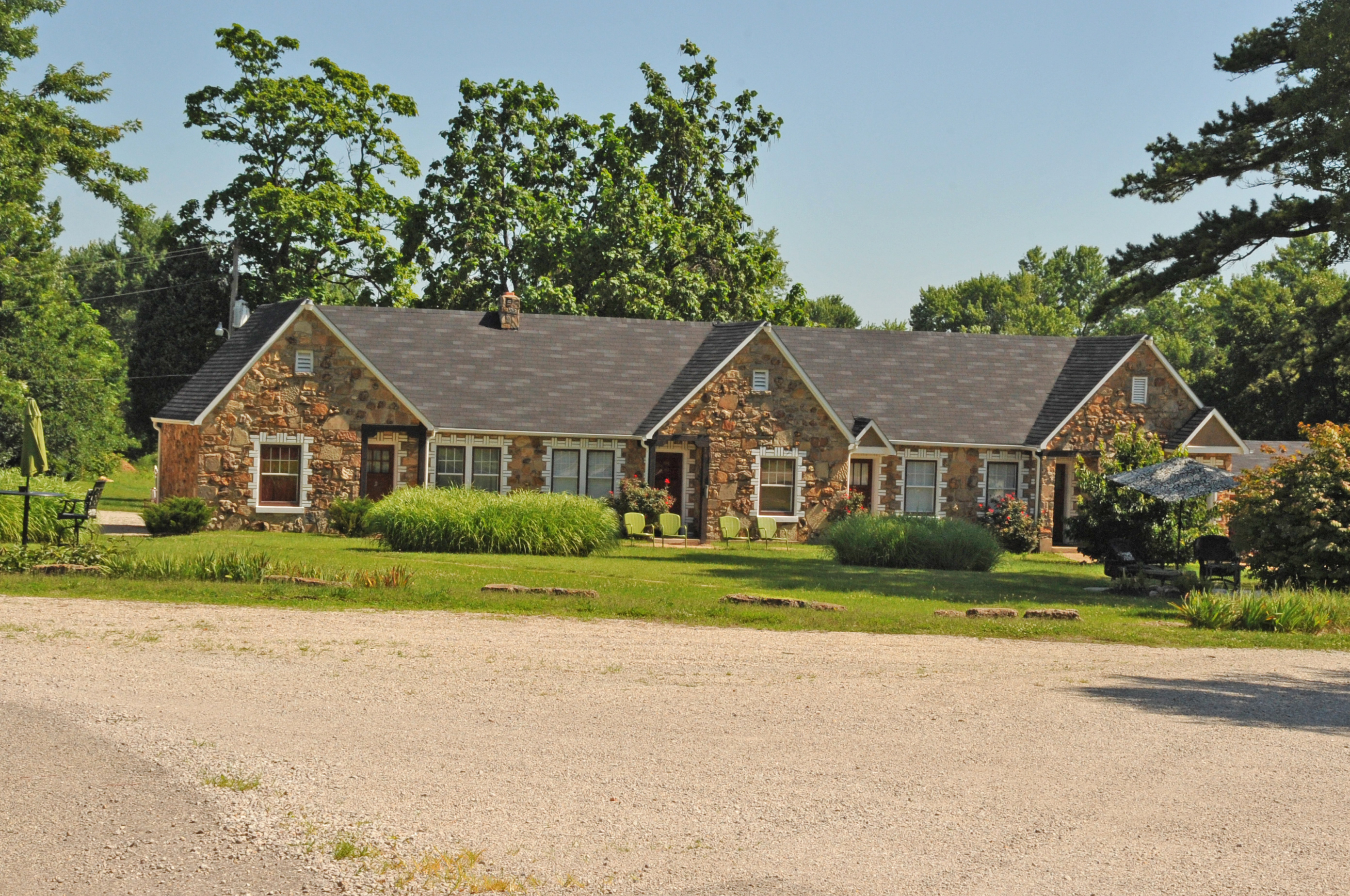
- Interactive map of the Wagon Wheel Motel, Café and Station area

General information
- Location: Cuba, Missouri, 901 East Washington Street

Other information
- Number of rooms: 19
- Number of restaurants: 1 (now closed)
- Parking: on-site

Website
- wagonwheel66cuba.com
- Wagon Wheel Motel, Café and Station
- U.S. National Register of Historic Places
- U.S. Historic district
- Location within Missouri Location within the United States
- Location: U.S. Route 66 in Missouri
- Coordinates: 38.0646°N 91.3966°W
- Built: 1934
- Architect: Leo Friesenhan
- Architectural style: Tudor Revival
- Restored: 2010
- Restored by: Connie Echols
- MPS: Route 66 through Missouri MPS
- NRHP reference No.: 03000183
- Added to NRHP: April 7, 2003

The Wagon Wheel Motel, Café and Station in Cuba, Missouri, is a 19-room independently owned historic U.S. Route 66 restored motel which has been serving travelers since 1938. The site opened as a café in 1936; the motel has remained in continuous operation since 1938. The motel rooms were fully restored in 2010, adding modern amenities such as HDTV and wireless Internet.

A filling station which once also occupied the original 1936 property is no longer in active use; the original Wagon Wheel Café restaurant is now a retail store filled with jewelry, purses, décor, Route 66 books, T-shirts and a few original Wagon Wheel antiques. The property has been listed on the National Register of Historic Places since 2003.

== History ==
One of the oldest motels on US Route 66, the Wagon Wheel Cabins consisted in 1938 of three stone lodging buildings. Set back 200 feet from the road, these originally provided a few rooms each plus an office and garages for motorcar storage at a time when cabins or cottages in most tourist courts were simple single-room structures. The restaurant, filling station and signage were located at roadside.

Wagon Wheel Cabins on U.S. 66, the east side of town. 9 newly constructed stone cottages each with a private tub or shower bath. Very well furnished; gas heat; fans in summer; enclosed garages. Rates $2.50 to $3 per day for two persons. This is a home away from home. Splendid surroundings. Café; laundry services; rest rooms; super service station. One of the finest courts in the state. Very good.

— American Automobile Association (1939 directory listing)

The original buildings were constructed using local Ozark sandstone and designed in the Tudor Revival style by stonemason and builder Leo Friesenhan. Original owners Margaret and Robert Martin ran the motel until 1946, by which time the accommodations had been expanded, converting garages to motel units and bringing the site up to fourteen rooms. The filling station was leased to Marathon Oil Company from 1936 to 1941 and operated by Joe and Clara Slowensky.

John and Winifred Mathis purchased the lodgings in 1947, adding two new buildings at the rear of the property (one of which would add additional rooms for travelers), installing neon signage (which remains in use today) and changing the name to Wagon Wheel Motel. They became early members of The Best Western Motels referral chain at a time when the network operated as a loose coalition of independent, locally owned and operated motels.

The Wagon Wheel Café was acquired by Bill and Sadie Mae Pratt, operating independently of the motel and obtaining favorable reviews from the Duncan Hines travel guide. This popular eatery moved to a larger building east of the town as the Wagon Wheel Restaurant in 1954 and was sold in December 1956.

Pauline Roberts later operated a small complementary coffee and doughnut shop from a circa-1950 frame storage building at the back of the motel; it closed when her first husband, Wayne Roberts, died in 1980. This mixed-use building later housed the motel's laundry; it is now a pavilion for social gatherings and a dry place to park motorcycles.

U.S. Highway 66 (East Washington Street) was the main road in the area from 1926 until Interstate 44 bypassed Cuba in 1969.

Route 66 in Missouri has its share of "ghost motor courts," as well as many former courts and motels which have found new life serving different functions. It is worth noting that there are also a few motels and courts along the route that managed to hang on through the slow years following decommissioning. Several of those now enjoy trade from travelers who wish to recreate the Route 66 experience. The Wagon Wheel Motel in Cuba, Missouri is one such motel. It continues to operate in its original function, and in recent years has had overnight guests from all over the world, many of whom come thousands of miles to enjoy the historic ambiance of Route 66.

— Becky Snider, Debbie Sheals (Missouri Alliance for Historic Preservation), consultants' report to State Historic Preservation Office, 2003.

Under longtime owner Pauline Armstrong, who (as Pauline Roberts) had purchased the properties in 1963 and operated the motel until her demise forty years later, the 5.34-acre "Wagon Wheel Motel Historic District" was added to the US National Register of Historic Places. The designation includes the original 1936 stone café and gas station buildings (the original café building at that time was a souvenir shop), all three original stone motel buildings, plus one concrete block motel building and the frame mixed-use building added circa-1950. The listing also included two historic signs (the neon "Wagon Wheel Motel" and "office" signage) and a concrete gas pump island.

A similarly named "Wheel Well Motel" appeared in the animated 2006 film Cars, a movie based heavily on US Route 66 people and places.

== Restoration ==
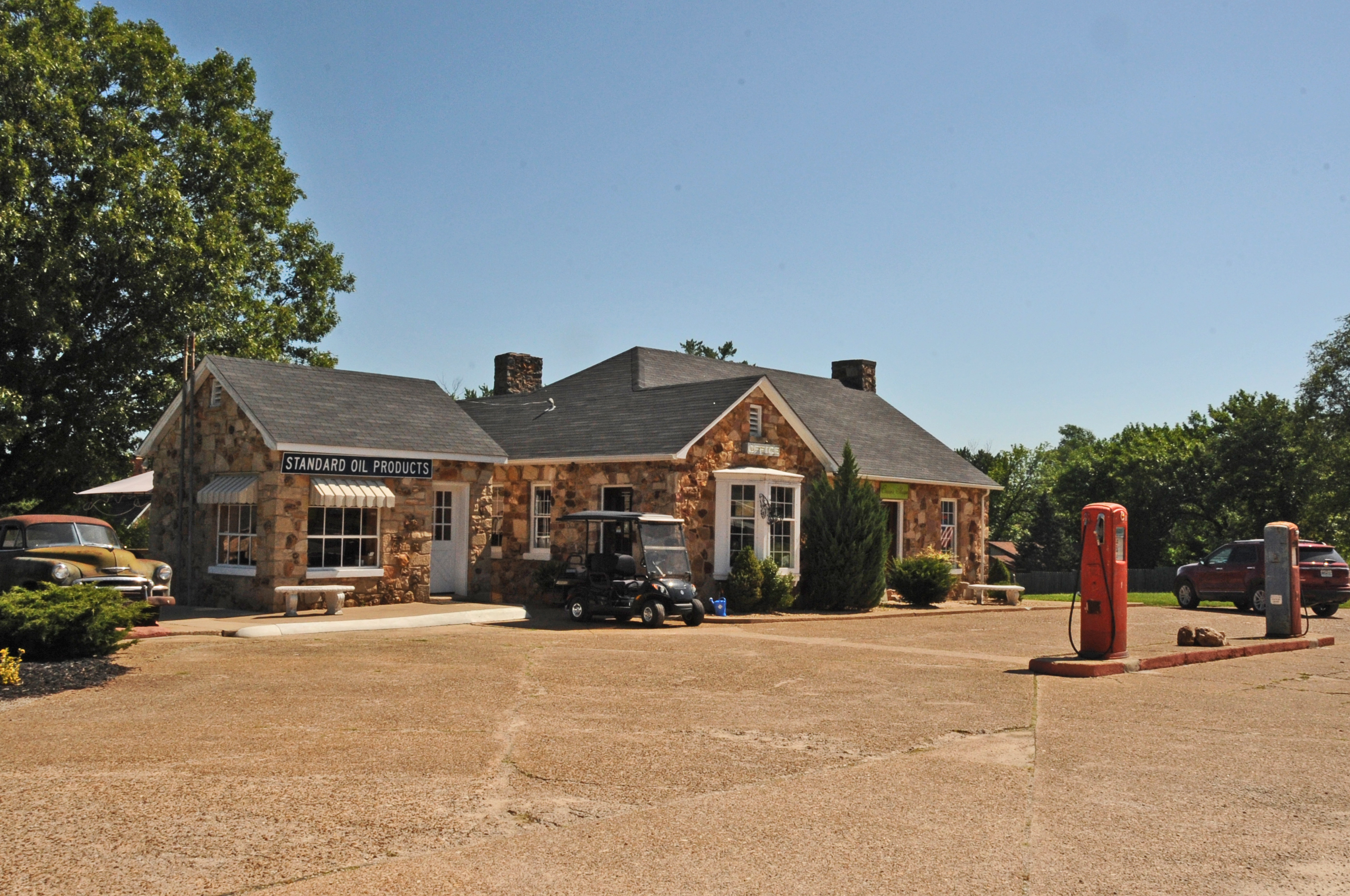
Former gas station and office

While the motel continued operating after the demise of Pauline Armstrong (2003) and her widower Harold (2008), the property slowly began to decline. Connie Echols purchased the site from Harold's son James Armstrong in September 2009, operating the café building as a gift shop while painstakingly restoring each of the individual motel rooms with new plumbing, wiring, bedding and modern amenities in 2009 and 2010. A recent, temporary frame structure which obscured much of the original fuel station building was removed in November 2009 as part of the effort to return the site to its original architectural appearance. A $12733 federal matching grant in 2012 was used to replace the roof on one building.

In 2010, Henry Cole brought a documentary crew from London, England, to record "The World's Greatest Motorcycle Rides" for the Travel Channel; the series devoted two episodes to a tour of the various U.S. states along historic Route 66.

The Wagon Wheel was host for one day of Spyderfest, an annual April gathering for Spyder Ryders which was held in Cuba from 2010 to 2012, and remains one of the main stops for many Route 66 tour groups and car clubs. During Spyderfest, the Wagon Wheel hosted a Spyder Welcome Home Party with food, music, a bonfire and Spyder games.

The Wagon Wheel Motel, as the oldest continuously operating motel on US 66, celebrated its 75th anniversary on August 20–21, 2011, with a Bonnie and Clyde-themed celebration complete with historic cars and garb of the era. The history of the property would ultimately serve as the topic of a 2011 book, The Wagon Wheel Motel on Route 66.
