= Snelson-Brinker House =

Historic house in Missouri, United States

- U.S. National Register of Historic Places
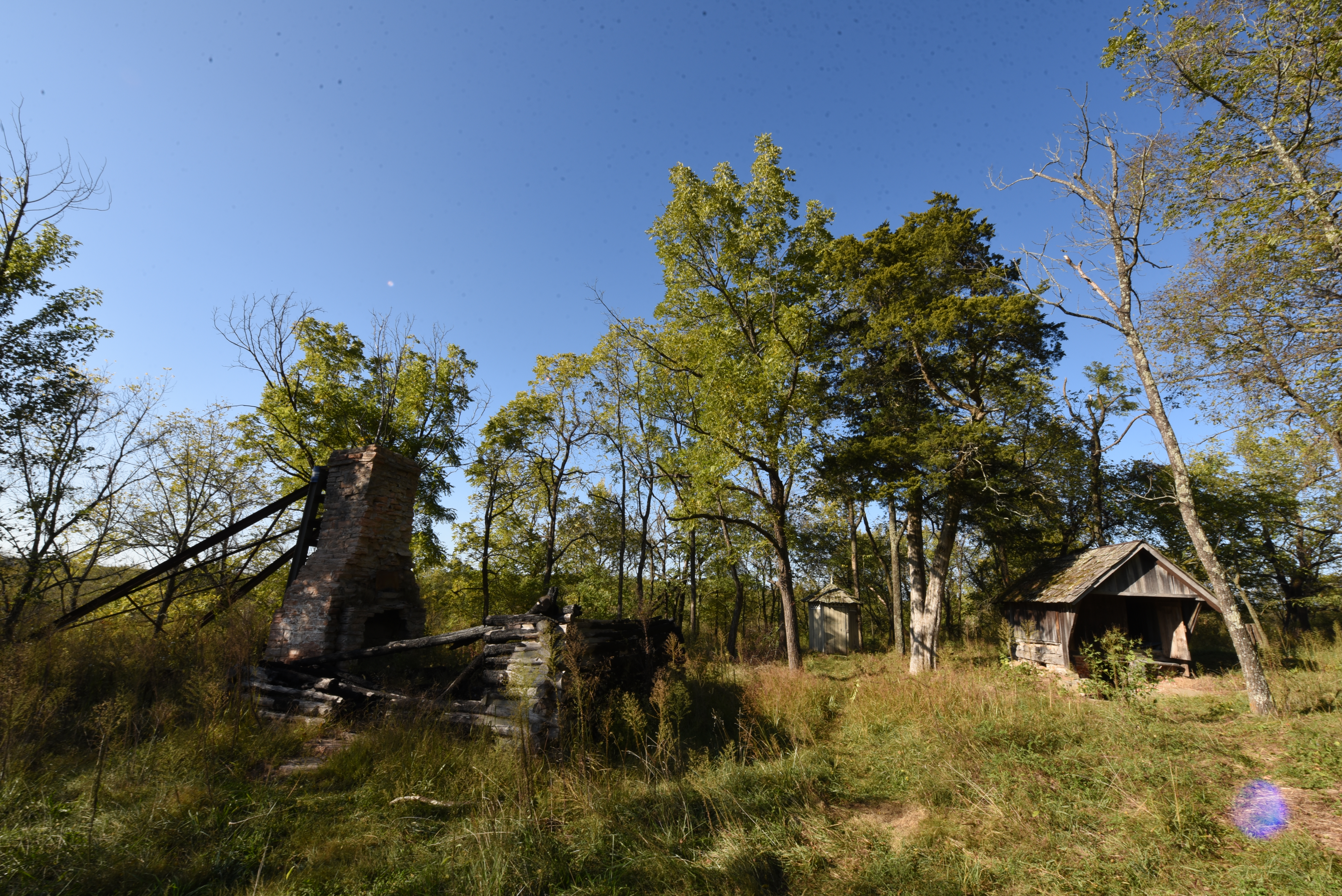
- Ruins of the house

- Location within Missouri Location within the United States
- Location: Route 8, near Steelville, Missouri
- Coordinates: 37°56′56″N 91°30′4″W
- Area: 1.7 acres (0.69 ha)
- Built: 1834
- Architectural style: Double-Pen Log Dwelling
- MPS: Cherokee Trail of Tears MPS
- NRHP reference No.: 07000576
- Added to NRHP: June 21, 2007

Snelson-Brinker House was a historic home located near Steelville, Crawford County, Missouri. It was built by Levi Lane Snelson in 1834, as a one-story, double-pen log dwelling, and sold to John B. Brinker in 1837. Later that year, the property was the site of the murder of Brinker's two-year-old daughter Vienna, for which Mary the slave became the youngest person to be executed in Missouri history. The house was extensively rebuilt in the late 1980s. Also on the property are the log and frame smokehouse/root cellar (c. 1880), a cast iron pump (c. 1910), an open field and beyond the field is a cemetery with graves dating back to the 1830s. The property was eventually operated by the St. James Historical Preservation Society as a historic house museum.

The Snelson-Brinker House is significant as a campsite and gravesite during the period of the Trail of Tears. The house was listed on the National Register of Historic Places in 2007. It burned down on July 4, 2017, due to vandalism.
