= Cuba City Jail =

- U.S. National Register of Historic Places
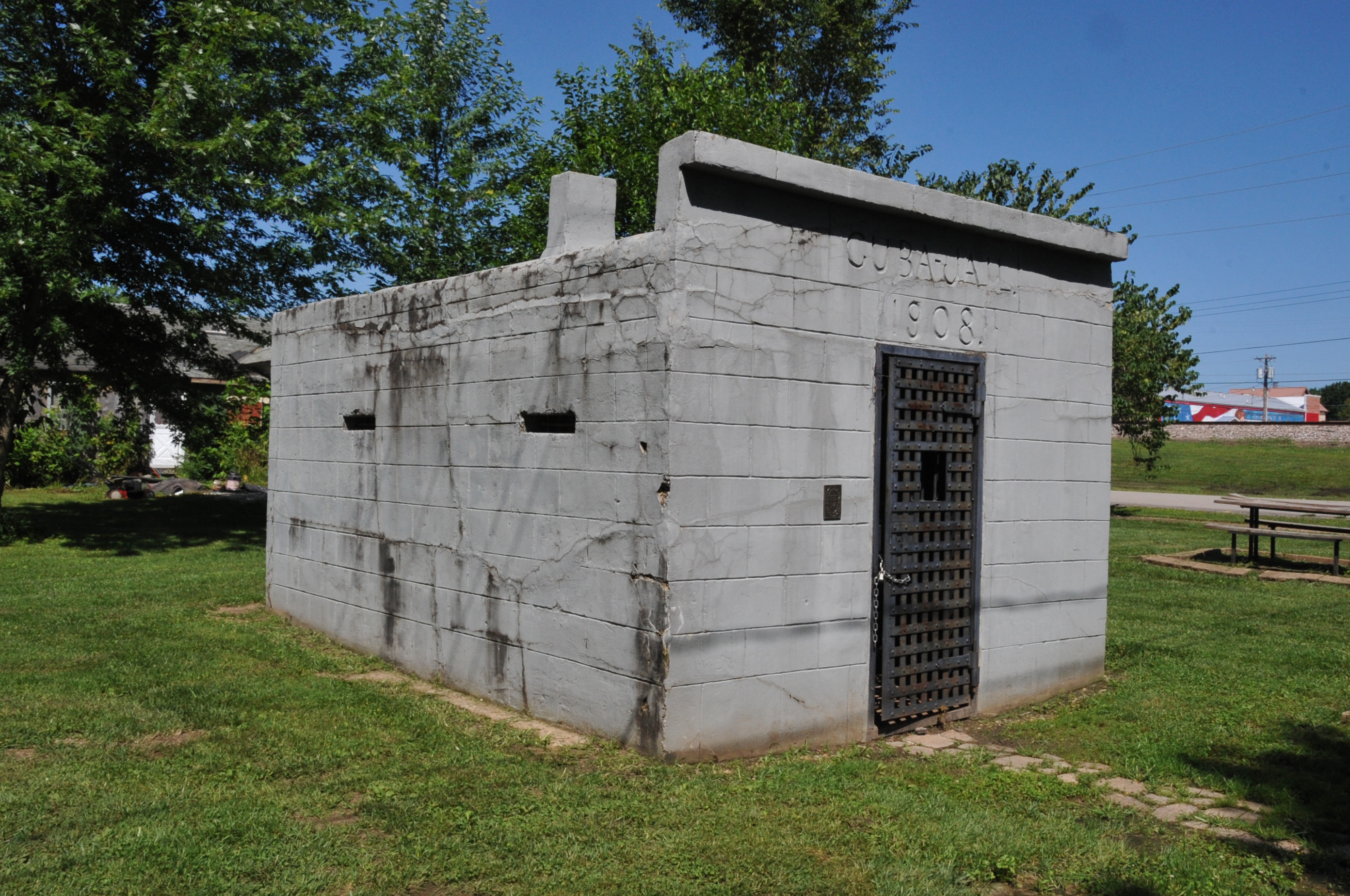
- Cuba City Jail, January 2009

- Location within Missouri Location within the United States
- Location: Prairie St. & 300 blk. of S. Main St., Cuba, Missouri
- Coordinates: 38°03′40″N 91°24′16″W
- Area: less than one acre
- Built: 1908
- Built by: Harrison, William (or Harmon)
- MPS: Historic and Architectural Resources of the City of Cuba, Missouri, 1821-1963
- NRHP reference No.: 14000880
- Added to NRHP: October 29, 2014

Cuba City Jail is a historic jail located at Cuba, Crawford County, Missouri. It was built in 1908, and is a one-story, rectangular-shaped, concrete block jail structure. It consists of a primary guard space complete with desk and wood-burning stove and a rear cell room with pair of hanging iron bunks. The structure was in use until 1954 and today serves as a museum.

It was listed on the National Register of Historic Places in 2014.
