= Mary (slave) =

Teenage slave executed in 1838

- Born: c. 1824
- Died: August 11, 1838 (aged 14); Steelville, Missouri, U.S.
- Occupation: Slave
- Status: Executed by hanging
- Motive: Revenge (alleged)
- Conviction: First degree murder
- Penalty: Death

Mary (c. 1824 – August 11, 1838) was an American enslaved teenager who was hanged for the murder of her enslaver's daughter Vienna Brinker, a two-year-old girl whom she was babysitting. Her case was notable both for her youth and for the extended legal process that preceded her execution. Although her exact age is unknown, it is generally agreed that she is the youngest person to have been put to death in Missouri.

== Background ==
Mary was originally owned by Abraham Brinker, who had settled in Potosi, Missouri, in the 1810s. She was described as "mulatto", though it is unclear if she had any biological relationship to the Brinker family. Abraham was killed by Native Americans in 1833, and his slaves were inherited by his son John. John's first child, Vienna Jane Brinker, was born on May 25, 1835, and Mary was tasked with babysitting her. In February 1837, the family and their slaves moved into what would become known as the Snelson-Brinker House, a single-story log cabin near Steelville.

== Death of Vienna Brinker ==
On May 14, 1837, the body of Vienna Brinker was discovered in a stream on the Brinker property. She had suffered blunt trauma to her right temple. John Brinker's wife Sarah had asked Mary to gather firewood, and she took Vienna with her. She later returned to the house without Vienna, and claimed not to know where she was. John Brinker gathered two of his neighbors, William Blackwell and Thomas Shirley, to help search for his daughter. They eventually followed Mary's footsteps down to the stream, where Shirley found her body. Some sources have speculated that Mary killed Vienna because Vienna's father was planning to sell Mary.

== Trials and execution ==
After the discovery of the body, Mary was tied to a log by William Blackwell and threatened with a whipping. She subsequently admitted to throwing Vienna in the stream and then beating her body with a stick to stop it surfacing. She later made a similar confession to Simeon Frost, a local justice of the peace. Mary was charged with first-degree murder and placed in the Potosi jail. Her trial began on August 16, 1837, and she was provided with three court-appointed attorneys. She was found guilty two days later, and subsequently sentenced to be hanged at Steelville on September 30.

Mary appealed the verdict to the Missouri Supreme Court. The presiding judge, Mathias McGirk, reversed the decision of the Crawford County circuit court, citing numerous irregularities in both her indictment and the trial process. Mary was re-indicted and a new trial was scheduled. It was originally supposed to be held in Gasconade County, but was later shifted back to Crawford County. The second trial returned the same verdict as the first, and Mary was hanged at Steelville on August 11, 1838.

Contemporary newspapers reported Mary's age as either 13 or 14, while a later account in a history of Crawford County gave it as 16. The trial judge, James Evans, had instructed the jury to consider whether Mary was above the age of criminal responsibility (14), or whether she was below that age but "had sufficient mind to know what act would be a crime". In any case, Mary is generally considered to be the youngest person to have been executed by the state of Missouri.

== See also ==
- Annice (slave), first enslaved woman executed in Missouri
- Hannah Ocuish, youngest girl executed in the United States
- State of Missouri v. Celia, a Slave (1855)
