= Dark Creek =

Stream in the American state of Missouri

Dark Creek is a stream in northwest Randolph, County, Missouri. It is a tributary of the East Fork Little Chariton River. The stream headwaters are just south of the county line to the east of the Thomas Hill Reservoir. The stream flows south to southwest to its confluence just north of U.S. Route 24 between Huntsville and Clifton Hill.

The stream source is at 39°36′25″N 92°33′44″W and the confluence is at 39°26′23″N 92°37′49″W.

According to a tradition, Dark Creek was so named by a pioneer citizen on a dark night.

== See also ==
- List of rivers of Missouri
