= National Register of Historic Places listings in Carter County, Missouri =

Location of Carter County in Missouri

This is a list of the National Register of Historic Places listings in Carter County, Missouri.

This is intended to be a complete list of the properties and districts on the National Register of Historic Places in Carter County, Missouri, United States. Latitude and longitude coordinates are provided for many National Register properties and districts; these locations may be seen together in a map.

There are 31 properties and districts listed on the National Register in the county.

This National Park Service list is complete through NPS recent listings posted March 14, 2025.

== Current listings ==
| | Name on the Register | Image | Date listed | Location | City or town | Description |
|---|---|---|---|---|---|---|
| 1 | Mrs. Louis Bedell House | Mrs. Louis Bedell House | October 14, 1980 (#80002324) | 3rd and Maple Sts. 36°49′55″N 90°49′15″W | Grandin | |
| 2 | Big Spring Historic District | Big Spring Historic District | March 17, 1981 (#81000101) | E of Van Buren on MO 103; 36°56′55″N 90°59′35″W | Van Buren | |
| 3 | Earl Boyer House | | October 14, 1980 (#80002325) | 5th St. 36°49′42″N 90°49′18″W | Grandin | |
| 4 | Carter County Courthouse | Carter County Courthouse | October 6, 2022 (#100008239) | 105 Main St. 36°59′42″N 91°00′52″W | Van Buren | |
| 5 | Chubb Hollow Site | | January 18, 1990 (#89002272) | Address Restricted | Van Buren | |
| 6 | J. W. Gibson House | | October 14, 1980 (#80002326) | 6th and Pine Sts. 36°49′51″N 90°49′45″W | Grandin | |
| 7 | Gooseneck Site | | October 2, 1990 (#90001473) | Hawes Memorial Campground: E½ SE¼ SW¼ of Section 15, Township 25 North, Range 1 East; 36°49′20″N 90°56′48″W | Poplar Bluff | |
| 8 | Delia Greensfelder House | | October 14, 1980 (#80002327) | 4th and N. Cherry Sts. 36°49′48″N 90°49′21″W | Grandin | |
| 9 | Loretta Herrington House | | October 14, 1980 (#80002328) | 5th St. 36°49′44″N 90°49′21″W | Grandin | |
| 10 | James Hinton House | | October 14, 1980 (#80002329) | Walnut St. 36°50′00″N 90°49′11″W | Grandin | |
| 11 | Nettie Jacobson House | | October 14, 1980 (#80002330) | 6th and Oak Sts. 36°49′49″N 90°49′38″W | Grandin | |
| 12 | Isaac Kelley Site (23CT111 and 23CT1) | | February 4, 1988 (#87002531) | Address Restricted | Hunter | |
| 13 | Nola Kitterman House | | October 14, 1980 (#80002331) | 6th St. 36°49′54″N 90°49′53″W | Grandin | |
| 14 | Wallace Knapp House | | October 14, 1980 (#80002332) | 6th and S. Elm Sts. 36°49′49″N 90°49′37″W | Grandin | |
| 15 | Buford Lawhorn House | | October 14, 1980 (#80002333) | 6th St. 36°49′52″N 90°49′44″W | Grandin | |
| 16 | Iva Lewis House | | October 14, 1980 (#80002334) | 6th St. 36°49′49″N 90°49′41″W | Grandin | |
| 17 | Masonic Lodge | Masonic Lodge | October 14, 1980 (#80002335) | 5th and S. Elm Sts. 36°49′49″N 90°49′33″W | Grandin | |
| 18 | Terry Mays House | | October 14, 1980 (#80002336) | 6th and S. Plum St. 36°49′44″N 90°49′26″W | Grandin | |
| 19 | Thornton McNew House | | October 14, 1980 (#80002337) | 6th and Spruce Sts. 36°49′53″N 90°49′47″W | Grandin | |
| 20 | Mill Pond | | October 14, 1980 (#80002338) | Off MO 21; 36°49′53″N 90°48′46″W | Grandin | |
| 21 | Della Nance House | | October 14, 1980 (#80002339) | 6th St. 36°49′50″N 90°49′41″W | Grandin | |
| 22 | Hazel Owens House | Hazel Owens House | October 14, 1980 (#80002340) | 5th St. 36°49′52″N 90°49′39″W | Grandin | |
| 23 | Phillips Bay Mill (23CT235) | | February 3, 1988 (#87002536) | Along a small Current River tributary southeast of Eastwood; 36°51′02″N 90°57′45″W | Eastwood | |
| 24 | Ernie Phillips House | | October 14, 1980 (#80002341) | 3rd and N. Cherry Sts. 36°49′53″N 90°49′20″W | Grandin | |
| 25 | Alvis Powers House | | October 14, 1980 (#80002342) | Walnut St. 36°49′56″N 90°49′13″W | Grandin | |
| 26 | Hazel Shoat House | Hazel Shoat House | October 14, 1980 (#80002343) | 5th St. 36°49′51″N 90°49′37″W | Grandin | |
| 27 | Sixth Street Historic District | Sixth Street Historic District | October 14, 1980 (#80002344) | 6th St. 36°49′46″N 90°49′36″W | Grandin | |
| 28 | James Smith House | | October 14, 1980 (#80002345) | 6th St. 36°49′43″N 90°49′24″W | Grandin | |
| 29 | Lawrence Smith House | Lawrence Smith House | October 14, 1980 (#80002346) | 3rd St. 36°49′54″N 90°49′10″W | Grandin | |
| 30 | William F. Smith House | William F. Smith House | October 14, 1980 (#80002347) | 6th St. 36°49′43″N 90°49′31″W | Grandin | |
| 31 | Lee Tucker House | | October 14, 1980 (#80002348) | 3rd St. 36°49′56″N 90°49′30″W | Grandin | |

== See also ==
- List of National Historic Landmarks in Missouri
- National Register of Historic Places listings in Missouri
