= House Creek =

House Creek may refer to:

- House Creek (California), a stream in California
- House Creek (Chattahoochee River tributary), a stream in Georgia
- House Creek, Missouri, an unincorporated community
- House Creek (New York), a stream in New York
- House Creek (Crabtree Creek tributary), a stream in North Carolina

== See also ==
- House Creek Township, Wake County, North Carolina
