= Hunter, Missouri =

- Census-Designated Place
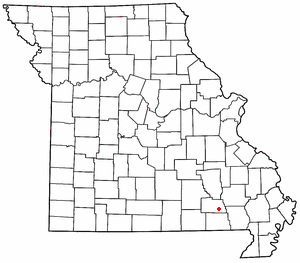
- Location of Hunter in Missouri
- Coordinates: 36°53′26″N 90°50′56″W
- Country: United States
- State: Missouri
- County: Carter

Area
  - Total: 3.64 sq mi (9.42 km^{2})
  - Land: 3.64 sq mi (9.42 km^{2})
  - Water: 0 sq mi (0.00 km^{2})
- Elevation: 742 ft (226 m)

Population (2020)
  - Total: 95
  - Density: 26.1/sq mi (10.09/km^{2})
- FIPS code: 29-33778
- GNIS feature ID: 2587080

Hunter is an unincorporated community and census-designated place in Carter County, Missouri, United States. As of the 2020 census it had a population of 95.

Hunter is located on State Highway 21, approximately 4 miles (6 km) north of the town of Grandin, and is about 3 miles (5 km) east of the Current River. The post office has closed and its mail now comes from either Grandin or Ellsinore.

== Demographics ==
Historical population
Census	Pop.	Note	%±
2020	95		—
U.S. Decennial Census

== History ==
=== Founding ===
The land on which Hunter sits was first patented by James Lieby on January 21, 1858. The land was later acquired by John Hunter, one of the stockholders of the Missouri Lumber and Mining Company, who established a sawmill at the site in 1887. This land and much of the surrounding area was then purchased by the Missouri Lumber and Mining Company, who had a contract to establish an 80-acre (32 ha) town, of which the Current River Railroad was to have half ownership, laid out the town at this location, naming it after John Hunter. The plat for the new town of Hunter was submitted at the Van Buren courthouse on October 27, 1888.

Hunter was the site of the junction of the Current River and the Cape Girardeau & Southwestern Railroads. The railroad depot, built in 1889, was the first building besides the sawmill to be built in the new town.

=== Timeline ===
At the time of Hunter's founding, the Missouri Lumber and Mining Company opened a company store across the street from the railroad depot, opened a hotel, established a logging camp and offered lots for sale, thus initiating a building boom in the newborn town.

1890 saw the establishment of the Hunter Post Office with George W. Marsh as its first postmaster. Irregularities in the running of the Hunter Post Office caused it to be closed on October 1, 1903. It reopened a few months later and continued until 1914 when it closed. The last postmaster of the Hunter Post Office was Arthur Lowe, who served in that position from 1911 to 1914. Hunter post office reopened at some point and stayed in business until the late 1970s.

In 1897 in an effort to promote the sale of land, the Missouri Lumber and Mining Company planted about 400 acres (160 ha) of orchards alongside the railroad leading into Hunter. The idea was to convince prospective buyers that the over-cut land was still productive. By 1902 the orchards planted around Hunter produced about 6,000 bushels of peaches in addition to other fruits. A cannery to process this fruit was established in 1903.

On March 20, 1902, the company hotel was purchased by J. R. Kelley and operated under the name Hunter Hotel.

In 1904 the first church in Hunter, the Hunter Christian Church, was organized, with Rev. Drenden its first pastor.

In 1910 the company store was purchased by the Brown Mercantile Company. In 1912 the store was sold to Grover Gladden who renamed it the Brown-Gladden Mercantile Company. Brown Mercantile repurchased the store from Gladden in 1916. The store was sold once again in 1922 to W. L. Skinner and operated under the name of Skinner & Webb Mercantile Company.

In 1912 the Munger Securities Company, a real estate company, was established, initiating a period of rapid growth in Hunter. The company operated until 1920, at which time it was dissolved.

In 1913, about the time the town was experiencing rapid growth due to the activities of the Munger Securities Company, the first school in Hunter was established. After the town voted $800.00 in bonds, the Munger Securities Company donated the land for the school building, which was completed in time for the 1913-14 school year. The first term of the Hunter school began on September 7, 1913. Miss Eunice Pace was the school's first teacher.

Also in 1913, a second hotel was established in Hunter. The hotel was operated by Mrs J. R. Kelley. In 1924 it was sold to W. L. Skinner.

In 1914 a grocery store operated by A. E. Richmond opened in Hunter.

The next year, 1915, a drug store operated by S. W. Campbell, and a third hotel, the Hunter Inn, operated by Mrs Sophis Hartman, came to town.

Also in 1915 three school districts, Hickory Hill, Grassy Valley, and Hunter consolidated to create the first high school in the town of Hunter. $4,500.00 was voted by the people of Hunter for the new school building, which was completed in time for the 1915-16 school year. Norman Greene was the first superintendent of Hunter High School. A new two-story brick building built on the southwestern side of the town was ready for use in the 1916-17 school year. Another school building was built after this, but in 1956 the Hunter school closed and consolidated with the school at Grandin, which in turn was consolidated with the Elsinore school district. Hunter is now part of the East Carter County R-II School District.

In 1917 the Bank of Hunter was organized with a capital stock of $10,000.00. Edward B. Joy was its first and only president. In 1923 the Bank of Hunter was purchased by the Carter County State Bank and closed.

1917 also saw the establishment of the Hunter Telephone Company with Edward B. Joy as its president.

In 1920 the town of Hunter reached its maximum population of about 700 residents. By way of comparison, Van Buren, which is currently the largest city in Carter County, had as of the 2020 U.S. Census a population of 747.

Although currently an unincorporated community, Hunter was officially incorporated on February 22, 1923. W. L. Skinner was the president of the town board. Charles Farrel was the town clerk.
