= Pike Township, Carter County, Missouri =

Missouri inactive township

Coordinates: 36.9861°N 91.1525°W

Pike Township is an inactive township in Carter County, in the U.S. state of Missouri. It contains the census-designated place of Fremont.

Pike Township was established in the 1890s, taking its name from Pike Creek.
