= Carter Creek =

Carter Creek may refer to:

- Carter Creek (Current River), a stream in Missouri
- Carter Creek (Meramec River), a stream in Missouri
- Irvington, Virginia, a town once known as "Carter's Creek Wharf" after a tributary of the Rappahannock River

== See also ==
- Carters Creek, a stream in Tennessee
