= John Barber White =

American politician (1847–1923)

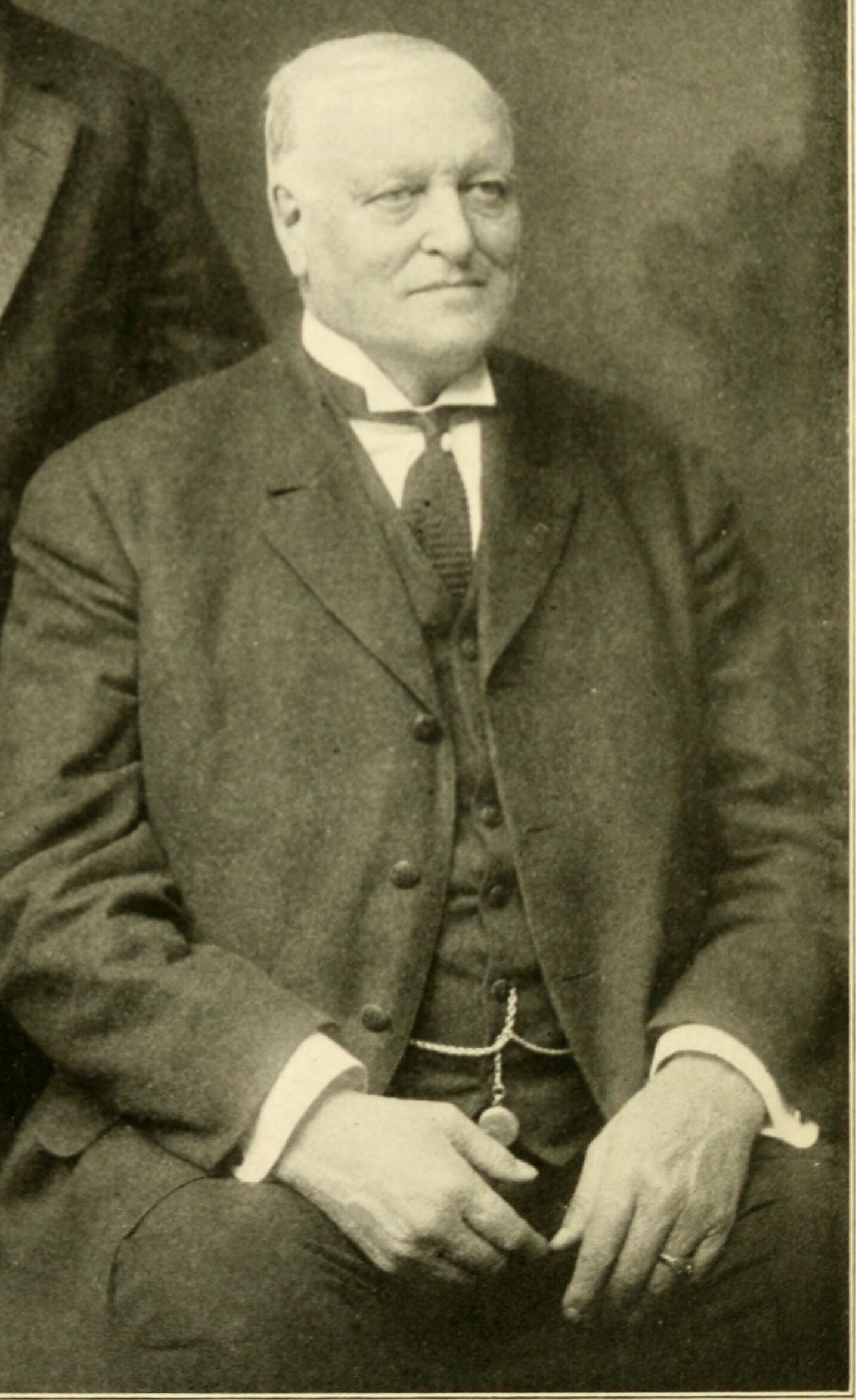
- White in 1916

Member of the Pennsylvania House of Representatives
- In office 1878–1879

Personal details
- Born: December 8, 1847 near Jamestown, New York, U.S.
- Died: January 5, 1923 (aged 75) Kansas City, Missouri, U.S.
- Resting place: Mount Washington Cemetery, Independence, Missouri
- Political party: Republican
- Spouses: Arabell Bowen (m. 1874; died 1879); Emma Siggins (m. 1882)
- Children: 5
- Occupation: Lumber businessman; politician; banker

John Barber White (December 8, 1847 – January 5, 1923) was an American lumber businessman. He was one of the founders of the Missouri Lumber and Mining Company, and served as a member of the Pennsylvania House of Representatives.

== Early life ==
John Barber White was born on December 8, 1847, near Jamestown, New York, to Rebekah (née Barber) and John White. His father was a schoolteacher and owned a sawmill in Ulster County, New York, and Chautauqua County, New York. At the age of 5, White's father died. White attended public schools and Jamestown Academy. He taught at Jamestown Academy for three terms and worked in lumbering.

== Career ==
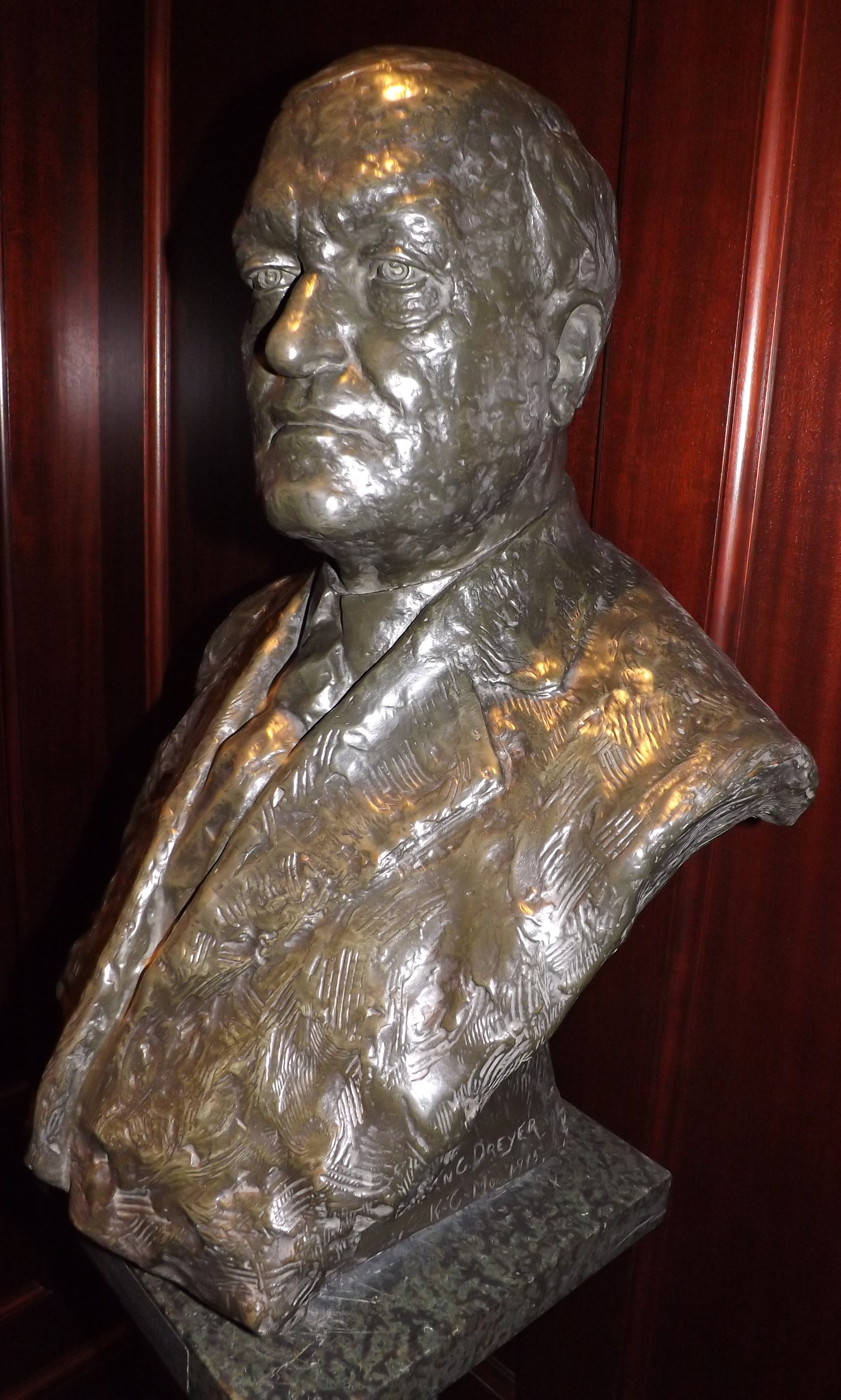
Bust of White in Kansas City Public Library sculpted by Jorgen Dreyer

In 1868, White with two brothers named Jenner bought a tract of about 200 acres (81 ha) of pine in Youngstown, Pennsylvania. In 1870, White purchased the Jenners' interest and became associated with R. A. Kinnear of Youngstown in owning lumber yards in Brady and Petrolia, Pennsylvania. In 1874, White sold his interests in the lumber yards and moved to Tidioute, Pennsylvania. In Tidioute, White purchased the Arcade mill and opened a lumberyard in Scrubgrass. In 1876, White moved to Youngstown and purchased a stave, heading and shingle mill in Irvineton. White was a Republican, but was nominated for the Pennsylvania legislature by the Democratic and the Greenback Party. He served as a member of the Pennsylvania House of Representatives from 1878 to 1879 and ran a newspaper called Warren County News in Warren County for two years. Afterward, he bought the paper's stock and sold it to C. E. White. In 1880, White, the Grandin brothers and others organized the Missouri Lumber and Mining Company in Grandin, Missouri. Henry H. Cumings, Jahu Hunter and L. L. Hunter also funded the venture. The business was later moved to West Eminence, Missouri, and the company was established in 1892 in Kansas City. He moved to Kansas City and served as president and general manager of the company.

In 1899, White and associates formed the Louisiana Long Leaf Lumber Company. In 1901, White and associates formed the Louisiana Central Lumber Company. White became president of the Missouri Lumber and Land Exchange (later renamed the Exchange Sawmills Sales Company). He was one of the founders and president of the Forest Lumber Company of Louisiana. The Forest Lumber Company of Louisiana owned a chain of retail yards in Missouri, Kansas, Nebraska, Colorado and Oklahoma. In 1920, White's companies bought a tract of 100,000 acres (40,000 ha) from the Gould heirs. They established two large lumber plants: the Louisiana Sawmill Company in Glenmora, Louisiana, and the White Grandin Lumber Company in Slagle, Louisiana. He remained active in the Forest Lumber Company until 1920 when his son took over his larger responsibilities. In 1922, White became chairman of the board of the different mill companies and the Exchange Sawmills Company. He also founded and served as president of the Missouri and Arkansas Lumber Association. He served as president of the Southern Lumber Manufacturers' Association.

White was active in the conservation movements during Theodore Roosevelt's administration and served on the National Conservation Congress. He served as president of the National Conservation Congress in 1911. He was a member of the Missouri Forestry Commission under the administrations of Governors Folk and Hadley. In 1905, Roosevelt appointed White as personal investigator into the affairs of the Leech Lake Indian Reservation at Cass Lake, Minnesota. Prior to 1907, White was connected with banking interests in Poplar Bluff, Missouri, serving as president of the Bank of Poplar Bluff. He was later engaged with the First National Bank in Kansas City and was a director of the New England National Bank.

During World War I, White was appointed by President Woodrow Wilson to the shipping board in January 1917. He remained in that role until he was forced to resign due to health in July 1917.

White was a deputy governor general of the Missouri Society of Colonial Wars and was an official with the Sons of the Revolution. He was a member of the Holstein-Friesian Association, the New England Historical and Genealogical Society, the Missouri Valley Historical Society, the National Geographic Society and the American Society of International Law. He served as president of the Missouri Valley Historical Society for nine years.

== Personal life ==
White married Arabell Bowen of Chautauqua County, New York, in 1874. They had two children, John Franklin White and Mrs. A. T. Hemingway. His wife died around 1879. White married Emma Siggins of Youngstown, Pennsylvania, in 1882. They had three children, Emma Ruth, Raymond B. and Jay Barber.

White owned a genealogical library valued at US$40,000, at the time of his death. White owned a summer home at Bemus Point on Chautauqua Lake and at the time of his death lived at 616 East 36th Street in Kansas City.

White died on January 5, 1923, at the research hospital in Kansas City. He was buried at Mount Washington Cemetery at Independence, Missouri.

== Legacy ==
White founded a high school building in Youngstown, Pennsylvania, called the White Memorial High School in memory of his son John Franklin White, who died in 1900. He funded a scholarship at Williams College in memory of his son.
