= Mill Pond (disambiguation) =

A mill pond is any body of water used as a reservoir for a water-powered mill.

Mill Pond may also refer to:

== Places in Canada ==
- Mill Pond (Oxford County), Ontario
- Mill Pond (Stormont, Dundas and Glengarry United Counties), Ontario
- Mill Pond (Halton Region), Ontario
- Mill Pond (Hastings County), Ontario
- Mill Pond (Kenora District), Ontario
- Mill Pond (Waterloo Region), Ontario
- Mill Pond (Durham Region), Ontario
- Mill Pond (Leeds and Grenville United Counties), Ontario
- Mill Pond (Frontenac County), Ontario
- Mill Pond (Prince Edward County), Ontario
- Mill Pond (Middlesex County), Ontario
- Mill Pond (Grey County), Ontario

== Places in the United States ==
- Mill Pond (Barnstable, Massachusetts), source of the Bass River
- Mill Pond (Duxbury, Massachusetts)
- Mill Pond (Littleton, Massachusetts), in Littleton, Massachusetts
- Mill Pond (Wareham, Massachusetts)
- Mill Pond (Grandin, Missouri), listed on the National Register of Historic Places

== Other uses ==
- The Mill Pond, a 1997 EP by John Fahey
- Mill Pond is also the title of a 1929 cartoon featuring farmer Al Falfa.

== See also ==
- Waddells Mill Pond Site, an archaeological site located seven miles northwest of Marianna, Florida
- Sloat's Dam and Mill Pond, a dam and mill pond between Waldron Terrace and Ballard Avenue in Sloatsburg, New York
- Cooksville Mill and Mill Pond Site, Evansville, Wisconsin, listed on the NRHP in Wisconsin
