= Brown Hollow =

Valley in Missouri, United States

Coordinates: 36.9475519°N 90.9173472°W

Brown Hollow is a valley in Carter County in the U.S. state of Missouri.

Brown Hollow was named after James Brown, a slave..
