= Crites Corner, Missouri =

Unincorporated community in Missouri, U.S.

Coordinates: 36°57′01″N 90°49′21″W

Crites Corner is an unincorporated community in Carter County, in the U.S. state of Missouri. The community is located on U.S. Route 60, west of Ellsinore.

Crites Corner was named after Donald Crites, a local merchant.
