= Fremont, Missouri =

- Census-designated place
- Location within the state of Missouri
- Coordinates: 36°57′8″N 91°9′51″W
- Country: United States
- State: Missouri
- County: Carter
- Township: Pike

Area
  - Total: 0.20 sq mi (0.51 km^{2})
  - Land: 0.20 sq mi (0.51 km^{2})
  - Water: 0 sq mi (0.00 km^{2})
- Elevation: 614 ft (187 m)

Population (2020)
  - Total: 43
  - Density: 217.8/sq mi (84.11/km^{2})
- Time zone: UTC-6 (Central (CST))
  - Summer (DST): UTC-5 (CDT)
- ZIP code: 63941
- Area code: 573
- FIPS code: 29-25948
- GNIS feature ID: 2587071

Fremont is a census-designated place in western Carter County, Missouri, United States. It is located on U.S. Route 60, approximately 10 miles (16 km) west of Van Buren in Pike Creek Valley. The community was founded circa 1887. As of the 2020 census it had a population of 43.

== Demographics ==
Historical population
Census	Pop.	Note	%±
2020	43		—
U.S. Decennial Census

== History ==
=== Founding ===
The site of the town of Fremont was originally patented by Julius N. Russell. The claim was filed at Jackson, Missouri, on January 1, 1859. Like most communities that came to be in Carter County, Fremont's origins can be tied to the activity of the Missouri Lumber and Mining Company. In 1887 they granted the Current River branch of the Frisco Railroad a right-of-way across their land in Carter County. By July 3, 1888, the tracks were laid and the first train ran through the new town. The plat for the town was submitted to the county on July 10, 1888.

=== Name ===
The new town, which was laid out on land the railroad had acquired as part of its right-of-way through Carter County, was originally to be called "McDonald", after the chief engineer who had laid out the site of the town for the railroad. But the postal service rejected this name because it was too similar to McDowell, Missouri.

While trying to decide on a new name for the town, J. L. Greene suggested that it be called "Peggy" in honor of Peggy Snider, the wife of Dr. James Snider, one of the early pioneers of the region. This name was submitted to the postal service and accepted, and for many years Peggy was the name of the town.

In 1907 the name of the town was changed again, this time to Fremont, in honor of John C. Frémont (1813 - 1890), who was a famous explorer and soldier. Even after the name was changed to Fremont the town continued to be listed as Peggy on some maps for a number of years afterward, the 1911 Rand McNally & Co Atlas being one example.

=== Industry ===
About the only remnants of the towns industry are the railroad embankments. Ties and other uses of lumber fuelled the town through the turn of the 20th century.

In 1917 an iron smelter was built along Pike Creek about 2 miles (3 km) north of town, and the community of Midco was created. After the need for iron diminished, the community dissolved, leaving only the smelter's smokestack and the Midco Cemetery on the hill east of the site as a reminder of the town's existence.

=== The 1957 Carter County Tornado ===
From May 20th to May 26th 1957, a series of severe thunderstorms and tornadoes occurred across the Lower Ohio Valley and southern Plains. One of these tornadoes, known as the 1957 Carter County Tornado, was an F4 tornado that began in the Mark Twain National Forest on May 21st, 1957 at approximately 03:53pm and moved through the northeast corner of Carter County. Along its path, the tornado devastated the town of Fremont and neighboring Van Buren, resulting in 7 fatalities and 35 injuries. It was estimated to be around 500 yards wide and was on the ground for 25 minutes.

Following the 1957 Carter County Tornado, the Red Cross set up in the local Methodist church, one of the only buildings not destroyed. The Fremont Nebraska Guide and Tribune subsequently launched a fundraiser to help those remaining in Fremont, Missouri to rebuild, inviting all other towns and cities across the United States with the name of Fremont (a total of 15 cities) to pitch in. Fremont, North Carolina, Fremont, Ohio, and Fremont, Minnesota were among those who are documented to have contributed.

Notably, the old two-story brick school was in the direct path of the tornado and was completely destroyed. While no students were in the school during the time of the tornado, a major contribution of the National Junior Red Cross children's fund was to allow the 64 children in Fremont to have continued access to educational material while they continued their schooling in a partially reconstructed Baptist church. The old school was not repaired, and what remained was torn down. A new elementary school, worth $165,000 (equivalent to approximately $1.98 million in 2025) was built on the same site.
