= Pike Creek (Current River tributary) =

Stream in the U.S. state of Missouri

Pike Creek is a stream in Carter and Shannon counties in the Ozarks of southern Missouri. It is a tributary of the Current River.

The stream headwaters are in Shannon County at 37°00′06″N 91°23′57″W and the confluence with the Current is in Carter County at 36°59′40″N 91°01′16″W.

The source area of the stream lies just east of Bartlett and north of U.S. Route 60. The stream flows east passing under Missouri Route 19 at Winona. The stream course roughly parallels Route 60 as it passes Low Wassie and Fremont. The stream enters Carter County east of Low Wassie. Just north of Fremont the stream course includes several tight incised meanders as it passes the old Midco Iron Works site. The stream enters the Current River at Van Buren.

Although the source of the name Pike is disputed, the State Historical Society of Missouri believes pike fish in the stream most likely accounts for the name.

== See also ==
- List of rivers of Missouri
