= Chilton, Missouri =

Unincorporated community in Missouri, U.S.

Coordinates: 36°55′59″N 90°55′17″W

Chilton is an unincorporated community in central Carter County, in the U.S. state of Missouri. The community is located just north of the Current River, approximately six miles southeast of Van Buren.

== History ==
Chilton was platted in 1887, and named after James Chilton, a pioneer citizen. A post office called Chilton was established in 1888, and remained in operation until 1942.
