= Bearpen Hollow =

Valley in Missouri, United States

Coordinates: 36.863387°N 91.11624°W

Bearpen Hollow is a valley in Carter County in the U.S. state of Missouri.

Bearpen Hollow was named after a type of trap early settlers set out to catch bears.
