= Aldrich Valley =

Valley in Missouri, United States

Coordinates: 36°55′53.2″N 90°55′12.5″W

Aldrich Valley is a valley in Carter County in the U.S. state of Missouri. Aldrich Valley has the name of John Aldrich, a pioneer settler.
