= Carter Township, Carter County, Missouri =

Township in Missouri, US

Coordinates: 37.0067°N 91.0247°W

Carter Township is an inactive township in Carter County, in the U.S. state of Missouri.

Carter Township most likely took its name from Carter Creek.
