= House Creek, Missouri =

Unincorporated community in Missouri, U.S.

Coordinates: 37°01′03″N 91°03′45″W

House Creek is an unincorporated community in northwestern Carter County, in the Ozarks of southeastern Missouri, United States. The community is located on Missouri Route M, on the north side of House Creek, approximately two miles west of its confluence with the Current River. Van Buren lies about three miles to the southeast.

The nearby stream of the same name was named after Matthew Egom Pavel House, a pioneer settler.
