= North Hill Marsh Pond =

Pond in Massachusetts, United States

- Location within Massachusetts
- Location: Duxbury, Massachusetts
- Coordinates: 42°02′30″N 70°42′30″W
- Primary outflows: Back River
- Basin countries: United States
- Surface area: 38 acres (15 ha)

North Hill Marsh Pond is a 38-acre (150,000 m^{2}) pond in Duxbury, Massachusetts, United States. The pond is the headwaters to the Back River. The pond is located northeast of Round Pond and north of Island Creek Pond. A wildlife sanctuary borders this pond to the south, and the North Hill Country Club, accessible via Merry Avenue, off Route 14, borders this pond to the northeast. The water quality is impaired due to non-native aquatic plants in the pond.

These series of ponds are all part of the Island Creek Fish Ladder restoration project of 2006.

The Massachusetts Audubon Society's 129-acre (0.52 km^{2}) sanctuary on Mayflower Street includes a forest, bike trails, and a 90-acre (360,000 m^{2}) pond.
