= Henry H. Cumings =

American politician (1840–1913)

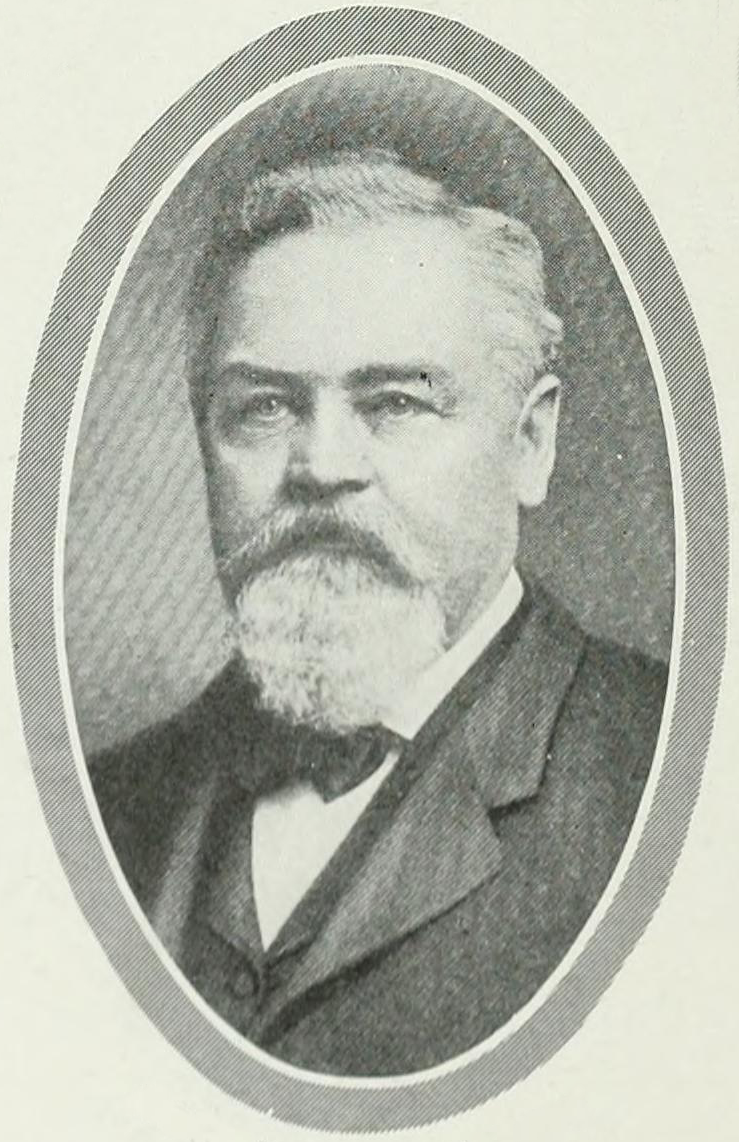
- Cumings in a 1914 publication

Member of the Pennsylvania Senate from the 48th district
- In office 1899–1906

Personal details
- Born: Henry Harrison Cumings; December 1, 1840 Monmouth, Illinois, U.S.
- Died: May 14, 1913 (aged 72) Tidioute, Pennsylvania, U.S.
- Resting place: Tidioute Cemetery
- Party: Republican
- Spouse: Charlotte Jane Sink (m. 1867)
- Children: 6
- Education: Oberlin College
- Occupation: Politician; farmer; businessman

Henry Harrison Cumings (December 1, 1840 – May 14, 1913) was an American politician from Pennsylvania. He was a member of the Pennsylvania Senate from 1899 to 1906.

== Early life ==
Henry Harrison Cumings was born on December 1, 1840, in Monmouth, Illinois, to Emily (née Amsden) and Charles Cumings. He attended local schools. He graduated with honors in absentia from Oberlin College in 1862.

== Career ==
Cumings left college to enlist in the 105th Ohio Infantry Regiment on August 20, 1862. He was reassigned as first lieutenant of Parson's Battery of the XIV Corps in January 1863. He was promoted to captain of Company A. He was assigned to the staff of colonel A. S. Hall and later served under brigadier general Edward H. Hobson. His regiment saw action at the battles of Perryville, Kentucky; Milton, Tennessee; Hoover's Gap, Tennessee; Murfreesboro, Tennessee; Lookout Mountain, Tennessee, Missionary Ridge, Tennessee; and Atlanta. In 1864, after Missionary Ridge, he was promoted to captain and transferred to Company K of the 105th Ohio. He participated in Sherman's March to the Sea. He mustered out in June 1865. He then moved to Pennsylvania. He engaged in producing and refining oil for Day & Company and later with the firm Hunter & Cumings. He was engaged in bonanza farming wheat in North Dakota. He was president of Tidioute Savings Bank and director of the Warren Trust Company. He was president of the Missouri Lumber and Mining Company for more than 30 years. In 1895, with W. R. and J. W. Brown of New York, he established in Tidioute the Union Razor Company.

Cumings served as a member of the borough council and as a member of the burgess. He was president of the Tidioute School Board for 34 years. He was a delegate to the 1888 Republican National Convention. He was a charter member of the Colonel George A. Cobham Post of the Grand Army of the Republic and served as its first commander. He served as commander of the Pennsylvania department of the Grand Army of the Republic from March 1895 to 1896. He was a member of the Gettysburg Battlefield Memorial Committee and was a member of the board of managers of the Pennsylvania Soldiers' and Sailors' Home in Erie. He was elected as a Republican to the Pennsylvania Senate, representing the 48th district, from 1899 to 1906. He was chairman of the game and fisheries committee and was a member of the agriculture, appropriations, corporations, education, finance, forestry, public grounds and buildings, public health and sanitation, public roads and highways, and railroads committees.

== Personal life ==
Cumings married Charlotte Jane Sink, daughter of Andrew J. Sink, of Rome, New York, in 1867. They had six children, Harriet Emily, Charles Andrew, Henry Harrison Jr., Sarah Charlotte, Ralph Hunter and Laura Frances. They lived in Tidioute. After the death of Andrew J. Sink, Cumings bought the Sink Opera House block on East Dominick Street in Rome, New York, which included Seegar's Dancing Academy and Stanwix Hall.

Cumings died on May 14, 1913, at his home in Tidioute. He was interred in Tidioute Cemetery.
