= Eastwood, Missouri =

Unincorporated community in Missouri, U.S.

Coordinates: 36°53′27″N 91°01′58″W

Eastwood is an unincorporated community in southwestern Carter County, in the Ozarks of southeast Missouri. The community lies within the Mark Twain National Forest, approximately seven miles south of Van Buren, at the intersection of Routes C and F.

== History ==
Eastwood was platted in 1910, and named after one of its founders, R. H. Eastwood. A post office was established at Eastwood in 1911, and remained in operation until 1923.
