= Carter Creek (Current River tributary) =

Stream in the U.S. state of Missouri

Carter Creek is a stream in Carter and Reynolds counties of southern Missouri. It is a tributary of the Current River.

The stream headwaters are located in Reynolds County at 37°03′34″N 90°54′46″W and the confluence with the Current River is in Carter County at 36°58′04″N 90°58′37″W. The stream flows southwest to south and passes under Missouri Route 21 and U.S. Route 60 before entering the Current about two miles southeast (downstream) of Van Buren.

Carter Creek was named after Zimri A. Carter, a pioneer settler.

== See also ==
- List of rivers of Missouri
