= Island Creek Pond =

Pond in Massachusetts, United States

- Location within Massachusetts
- Location: Duxbury, Massachusetts
- Coordinates: 42°01′40″N 70°42′41″W
- Primary outflows: Island Creek
- Basin countries: United States
- Surface area: 43 acres (17 ha)
- Settlements: Tinkertown

Island Creek Pond is a 43-acre (170,000 m^{2}) pond in Duxbury, Massachusetts in the village of Tinkertown. The pond is located north of Mill Pond, south of North Hill Marsh Pond, and southwest of Pine Lake and Round Pond. The pond is the headwaters to Island Creek. The water quality is impaired due to non-native aquatic plants and non-native fish in the pond. Crocker Park, an open space area owned by the Town of Duxbury, is situated along the southern shore of the pond.
