= Pine Lake (Duxbury, Massachusetts) =

- Location within Massachusetts Location within the United States
- Location: Plymouth County, Massachusetts, U.S.
- Coordinates: 42°01′55″N 70°43′19″W
- Type: Reservoir
- Primary outflows: Stream that flows into Round Pond
- Basin countries: United States
- Surface area: 23 acres (9.3 ha)
- Surface elevation: 72 ft (22 m)
- Dam: Pine Lake Dam
- Settlements: Duxbury, Tinkertown

Pine Lake is a 23-acre (93,000 m^{2}) lake in Duxbury, Massachusetts in the village of Tinkertown. The lake is located southwest of Round Pond, northwest of Island Creek Pond, and east of Route 3 near the East Street underpass. The outflow is a small stream that flows into Round Pond. A small subdivision lies along the southern shore of the lake.
