= Low Wassie, Missouri =

Unincorporated community in Missouri, U.S.

Coordinates: 36°59′19″N 91°15′29″W

Low Wassie is an unincorporated community in eastern Shannon County, in the Ozarks of southern Missouri, United States. The community is located at the junction of Pike and Sycamore Creeks on Missouri Route W, approximately one mile north of U.S. Route 60.

== History ==
A post office called Low Wassie was established in 1891, and remained in operation until 1943. The community was so named due to the presence of a sinkhole wetland (a "wassie" in local parlance) near the original town site.
