= Round Pond (Duxbury, Massachusetts) =

Reservoir in Massachusetts, United States

- Location within Massachusetts Location within the United States
- Location: Duxbury, Massachusetts
- Coordinates: 42°02′02″N 70°43′04″W
- Primary inflows: inlet that flows from Pine Lake
- Basin countries: United States
- Surface area: 11 acres (4.5 ha)

Round Pond is an 11-acre (45,000 m^{2}) reservoir in Duxbury, Massachusetts. The reservoir is located northeast of Pine Lake, northwest of Island Creek Pond, and southwest of North Hill Marsh Pond. An inlet provides the inflow for this reservoir from Pine Lake. The reservoir is associated hydro logically with an adjacent cranberry bog operation. It is a kettle hole formed by melting glaciers over ten thousand years ago. The north-west segment is bounded by a retaining berm that separates the pond from a cranberry bog. A pump house sits at the western edge with an intake pipe extending into the pond.
