= Ellsinore, Missouri =

City in Carter County, Missouri, United States

- City
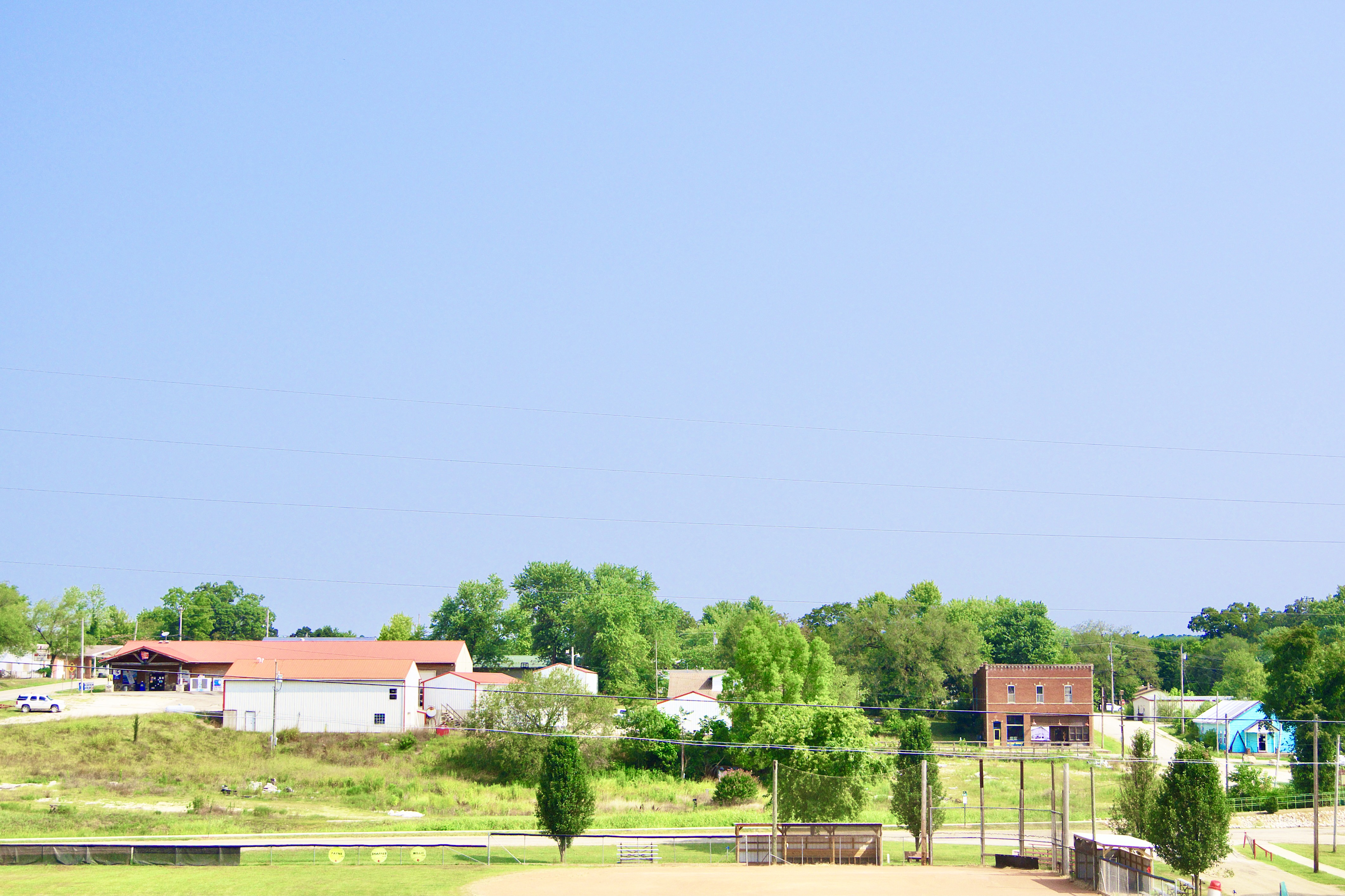
- Ellsinore

- Location of Ellsinore, Missouri
- Coordinates: 36°55′58″N 90°44′52″W
- Country: United States
- State: Missouri
- County: Carter

Area
  - Total: 0.51 sq mi (1.31 km^{2})
  - Land: 0.51 sq mi (1.31 km^{2})
  - Water: 0 sq mi (0.00 km^{2})
- Elevation: 732 ft (223 m)

Population (2020)
  - Total: 416
  - Density: 822.7/sq mi (317.66/km^{2})
- Time zone: UTC-6 (Central (CST))
  - Summer (DST): UTC-5 (CDT)
- ZIP code: 63937
- Area code: 573
- FIPS code: 29-21916
- GNIS feature ID: 2394665

Ellsinore is a city in Carter County, Missouri, United States. As of the 2020 census, Ellsinore had a population of 416.

== History ==
The site of the town of Ellsinore was originally patented on April 15, 1857, by Robert Patterson just two years before Carter County was organized. The land was later sold to a Mr. Cook, who in October 1876, sold the land to Charles Hearin. Charles Hearin cleared the land and raised corn and pumpkins on it. In 1888 Charles Hearin gave the Houck Railroad a right of way across his land, laid out the town, and built a railroad depot on the south side of the creek.

On March 2, 1889, the Current Local printed the following: “Over in the kingdom of Carter, on the land of the Cape Girardeau and Southwestern Railroad (Houck Railroad), at a point eleven miles distant from Williamsville, there is in process of evolution a little town bearing the name of Ellsinore …”

It is not exactly certain how the town came to be called Ellsinore, but the most widely accepted story is that Mr. Brooks, the chief engineer of the Houck Railroad, named the town after Elsinore Castle in Denmark, the setting of William Shakespeare's Hamlet. The post office however added an extra “l” making the spelling “Ellsinore.”

In 1888 John Carr opened the first store in Ellsinore which catered largely to the men who were building the railroad.

In early 1889 the Ellsinore Post Office was established, Silace Pace being its first postmaster.

In 1889 William Crommer and Bob Evans began operating a sawmill at Ellsinore, buying up most of the timber in the area that had not already been bought up by the Missouri Lumber and Mining Company. After passing through a number of hands it finally closed down in 1903 and the equipment moved to Kelley Fork in Wayne County.

In 1891 the first school was organized in Ellsinore. It consisted of a one-room school building and a two-room L-shaped building. Almost all the equipment was home made and the entire library consisted of a single very old copy of Webster's dictionary. The school was located near where the old water tower is located.

In 1895 the Ellsinore Hotel, run by Mamie Seats, was built and began operations.

In 1904 E. P. Queen and S. F. Jackson started up a new sawmill at Ellsinore. It was sold to the Store and Timber Company in 1908, which soon after went bankrupt.

In 1904 W. E. Condray and Clarence Crites began the Carter County Canning Company (4C Brand) in Ellsinore, but the business folded in 1907 largely due to a lack of interest.

In 1907 the Bank of Ellsinore was established. The bank was robbed on August 14, 1918, but no arrests were ever made. The Bank of Ellsinore closed in 1930.

In 1912 the Ellsinore, Crommer Town, Lower Ten Mile, Upper Ten Mile, Hogan Hollow, White's Mill and Freeland school districts consolidated for the purpose of creating a high school.

In 1912 after passing through a number of owners the Ellsinore Hotel burned, and a new structure, the Seats Hotel, was built on the lot in 1913.

In 1913/14 the Ellsinore High School was accredited by the State Department of Education.

In 1918 “The Ellsinore News” began publication. Its name was later changed to “The Carter County News.” The newspaper folded in 1926.

In 1919 a new school building, a two-story brick structure, was built on the south side of town on the site where the school currently stands.

In 1920 the Farmers State Bank was established. Financial difficulty forced it to close in 1924.

In 1937 the Ellsinore School was rebuilt with WPA labor.

In 1938 the Ellsinore Post Office became the first office for Ozark Border Electric Cooperative and its postmaster, P.G. Wingo became the cooperative's first board president.

On April 13, 1939, a ceremonial first pole for Ozark Border Electric Cooperative was raised behind the Ellsinore Post Office.

== Geography ==
Ellsinore is located on Missouri Route V approximately one mile north of US Route 60. It is approximately 14 miles east-southeast of Van Buren and within the Mark Twain National Forest.

According to the United States Census Bureau, the city has a total area of 0.49 square miles (1.27 km^{2}), all land.

== Demographics ==
Historical population
Census	Pop.	Note	%±
1930	238		—
1940	267		12.2%
1950	299		12.0%
1960	311		4.0%
1970	342		10.0%
1980	362		5.8%
1990	405		11.9%
2000	363		−10.4%
2010	446		22.9%
2020	416		−6.7%
U.S. Decennial Census

=== 2010 census ===
As of the census of 2010, there were 446 people, 190 households, and 112 families residing in the city. The population density was 910.2 inhabitants per square mile (351.4/km^{2}). There were 225 housing units at an average density of 459.2 per square mile (177.3/km^{2}). The racial makeup of the city was 99.10% White, 0.45% Native American, and 0.45% from two or more races. Hispanic or Latino of any race were 1.12% of the population.

There were 190 households, of which 28.4% had children under the age of 18 living with them, 41.6% were married couples living together, 12.6% had a female householder with no husband present, 4.7% had a male householder with no wife present, and 41.1% were non-families. 38.9% of all households were made up of individuals, and 25.2% had someone living alone who was 65 years of age or older. The average household size was 2.35 and the average family size was 3.08.

The median age in the city was 37.3 years. 25.3% of residents were under the age of 18; 9.9% were between the ages of 18 and 24; 21.3% were from 25 to 44; 22.2% were from 45 to 64; and 21.3% were 65 years of age or older. The gender makeup of the city was 42.6% male and 57.4% female.

=== 2000 census ===
As of the census of 2000, there were 363 people, 162 households, and 99 families residing in the city. The population density was 830.7 inhabitants per square mile (320.7/km^{2}). There were 184 housing units at an average density of 421.1 per square mile (162.6/km^{2}). The racial makeup of the city was 98.07% White, 0.55% Native American, and 1.38% from two or more races. Hispanic or Latino of any race were 0.28% of the population.

There were 162 households, out of which 25.3% had children under the age of 18 living with them, 47.5% were married couples living together, 10.5% had a female householder with no husband present, and 38.3% were non-families. 36.4% of all households were made up of individuals, and 25.3% had someone living alone who was 65 years of age or older. The average household size was 2.20 and the average family size was 2.85.

In the city the population was spread out, with 22.6% under the age of 18, 9.1% from 18 to 24, 21.2% from 25 to 44, 20.4% from 45 to 64, and 26.7% who were 65 years of age or older. The median age was 43 years. For every 100 females, there were 78.8 males. For every 100 females age 18 and over, there were 75.6 males.

The median income for a household in the city was $17,143, and the median income for a family was $27,188. Males had a median income of $26,125 versus $16,250 for females. The per capita income for the city was $11,444. About 10.6% of families and 19.7% of the population were below the poverty line, including 22.8% of those under age 18 and 20.8% of those age 65 or over.

== Education ==
Public education in Ellsinore is administered by East Carter County R-Ii School District, which operates one elementary school, one middle school and East Carter Co. R-II High School.

The town has a lending library, a branch of the Carter County Library.

== Notable Locations ==
The Alcorn Corner House - At the North side of town by the Headstart building . Is one of the oldest buildings in the town, built around 1904. The name is derived from Lafayette and Alice Alcorn who farmed the property from about 1906 until retirement in 1943. It was later owned by Virgie Alcorn Evans.

2 Historical bridges - one In town that is part of Main Street and one connecting CR330 to town.

The Pioneer Museum - On Main Street, after the first bridge.

Royal Oak Charcoal - on county road 330 off highway 60

== Notable people ==
- Melvin Eugene Carnahan (1934 – 2000), Governor of Missouri from 1993 to 2000
- Albert Sidney Johnson Carnahan (1897 – 1968), member of the United States House of Representatives for southeastern Missouri for 14 years

== See also ==
- List of cities in Missouri
