= Mill Pond (Duxbury, Massachusetts) =

Pond in Massachusetts, U.S.

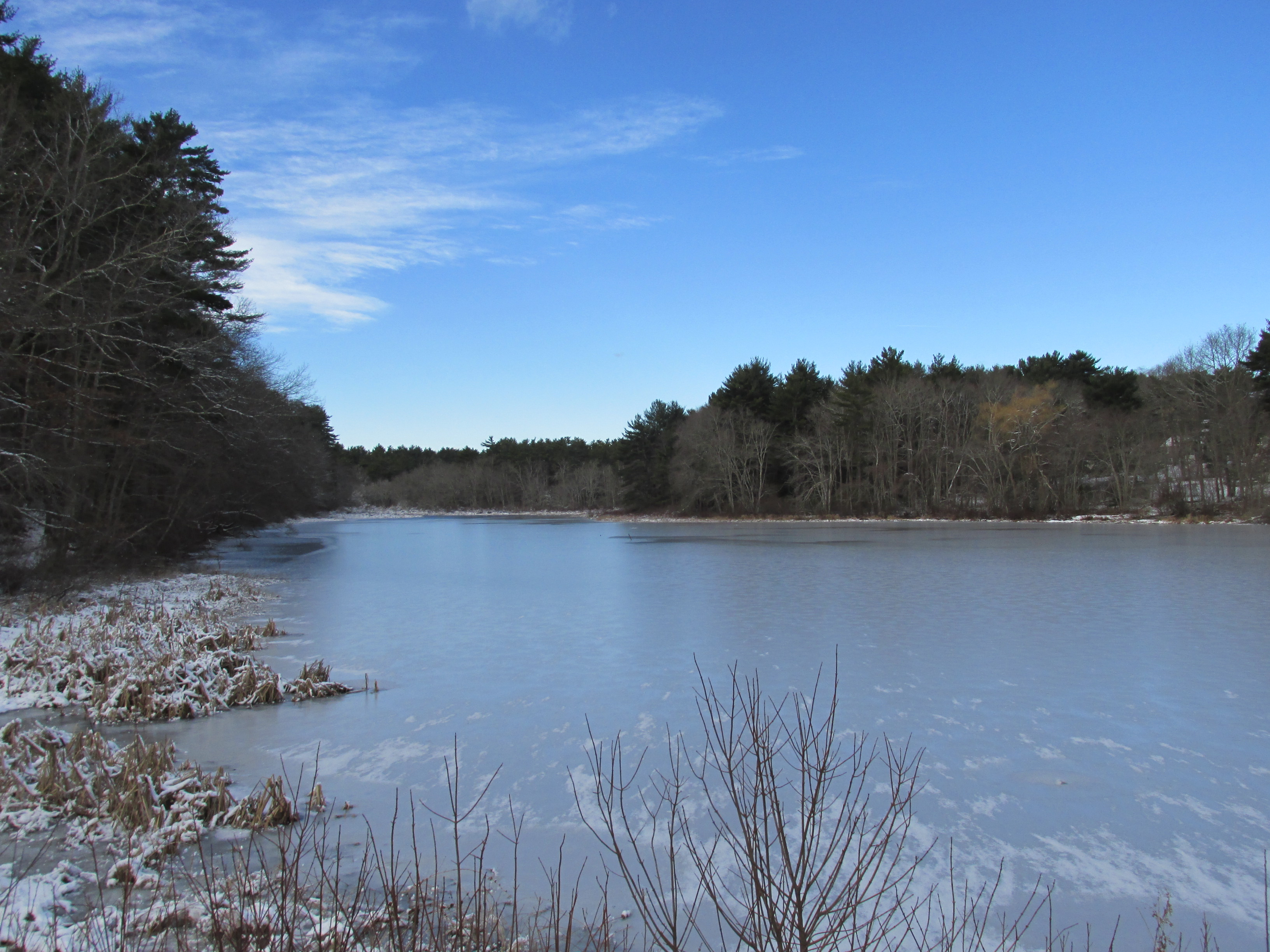
- Mill Pond

- Location within Massachusetts Location within the United States
- Location: Duxbury, Massachusetts
- Coordinates: 42°01′05″N 70°42′45″W
- Primary inflows: Island Creek
- Primary outflows: Island Creek
- Basin countries: United States
- Surface area: 13 acres (5.3 ha)
- Settlements: Island Creek

Mill Pond is a 13-acre (53,000 m^{2}) pond in Duxbury, Massachusetts in the village of Island Creek. The pond is located south of Island Creek Pond. Island Creek runs through the pond. Route 3A runs along the southern shore of the pond. The water quality is impaired due to non-native aquatic plants in the pond. The fishway at the Mill Pond dam has deteriorated and no longer functions.
