= Carter Creek (Meramec River tributary) =

River in Missouri, United States

Carter Creek is a stream in northeast Crawford County in the U.S. state of Missouri. It is a tributary of the Meramec River.

The stream headwaters arise approximately one mile east of Bourbon at 38°08′56″N 91°12′18″W and it flows east to southeast for about 3.5 miles to its confluence with the Meramec at 38°07′31″N 91°08′48″W.

Carter Creek has the name of a local family.

== See also ==
- List of rivers of Missouri
