= Missouri Lumber and Mining Company =

- Industry: Lumber
- Founded: 1880; 146 years ago
- Founders: O.H.P. Williams, E.B. Bishop, J.L. Livingston, Jahu Hunter
- Defunct: 1919; 107 years ago
- Fate: Closed
- Headquarters: Grandin, Missouri, United States (until 1910)
- Products: Dimensional lumber, shingles, lath

- Historic Resources of the Missouri Lumber and Mining Company
- U.S. National Register of Historic Places
- U.S. Historic district
- Location within Missouri Location within the United States
- Location: Grandin, Missouri
- Coordinates: 36°49′46″N 90°49′36″W
- Area: 9.9 acres (4.0 ha)
- Built: 1888-1909
- MPS: Missouri Lumber and Mining Company MRA
- NRHP reference No.: 64000398
- Added to NRHP: October 14, 1980

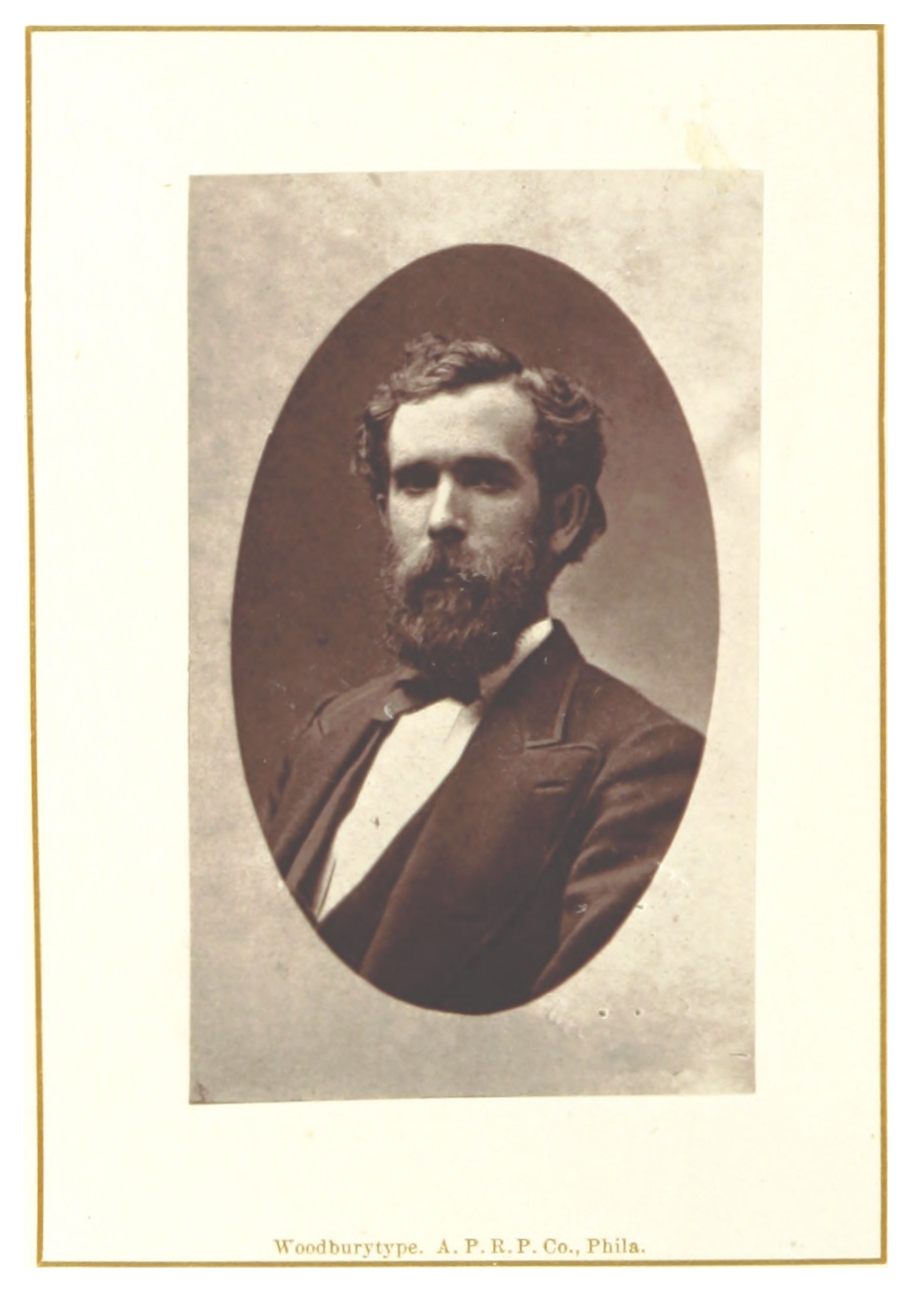
E.B. Grandin in 1873

Listed buildings in Missouri Mining and Lumber Company Historic Resources (see below for a detailed map)
Purple indicates commercial building
Blue indicates pond
Red indicates Sixth Street Historic District house
Green indicates other house

The Missouri Lumber and Mining Company (MLM) was a large timber corporation with headquarters and primary operations in southeast Missouri. The company was formed by Pennsylvania lumbermen who were eager to exploit the untapped timber resources of the Missouri Ozarks to supply lumber, primarily used in construction, to meet the demand of U.S. westward expansion. Its primary operations were centered in Grandin, a company town it built starting c. 1888. The lumber mill there grew to be the largest in the country at the turn of the century and Grandin's population peaked around 2,500 to 3,000. As the timber resources were exhausted, the company had to abandon Grandin around 1910. It continued timber harvesting in other parts of Missouri for another decade. While some of the buildings in Grandin were relocated, many of the remaining buildings were listed on the National Register of Historic Places in 1980 as part of the state's historic preservation plan which considered the MLM a significant technological and economic contributor to Missouri.

== Formation ==
In the 1860s, O.H.P. Williams, who was in the lumber business in Pittsburgh, Pennsylvania and his son-in-law, Elijah Bishop Grandin, who had prospered in the oil business in Tidioute, heard of the valuable timber in the Courtois Hills of Missouri and began purchasing land in Ripley County. They purchased an additional 30,000 acres (12,000 ha) in Carter County in the 1870s, for an average cost of $1/acre, and joined with two others from Tidioute, John Livingston Grandin (Elija's brother) and Jahu Hunter, a lumber and oilman, to form the company.

In addition to the inexpensive land, the investors thought the generally poor population would be eager to work for the company. They also felt that the milder winters would allow for year-round operation, unlike what they were used to in Pennsylvania. Another factor was proximity to the Great Plains states, a region with an expanding population and few trees.

The Missouri Lumber and Mining Company was incorporated in 1880. All four partners remained in Pennsylvania while John Barber White, a successful Tidioute mill operator, was hired to move to Missouri and run the company as its general manager.

Timberland was also amassed in Shannon, Reynolds, Butler, and Wayne counties. The land included thousands of acres of short-leaf Southern yellow pine as well as smaller amounts of hardwoods. In 1879 and 1880, White was able to buy land at Sheriff's sales for as little as five cents per acre.

The first lumber mill was built on the Black River in Wayne County and named White's Mill after the company's manager. The location is near the current city of Williamsville, Missouri and could mill six million board feet of lumber annually. It was difficult to transport the lumber for sale as the closest railroad was 10–15 miles (16–24 km) away at Mill Spring. Lumber had to be moved to the Iron Mountain Railroad depot there first by teamsters with oxcarts and then loaded onto railcard for transport to market.

The company tried for many years to obtain direct rail access to the mill, but Iron Mountain refused to provide it. In 1884, despite owning 100,000 acres (40,000 ha) of timberland in the county, the mill was never able to utilize its capacity and was closed because of the transportation issue. The mill had had 125 employees who were laid off.

== New mill ==
The company then turned its attention to Carter County, where its holding had grown to 100,000 acres (40,000 ha) with additional acreage in adjacent Ripley County. It identified a desirable mill location and sought the needed rail access. The company made a distribution deal with the Kansas City, Fort Scott and Memphis Railway (KFS&M). The KFS&M had already built a line from Springfield to Thayer in 1882. The railroad agreed to construct an 81 mi (130 km) spur from this line running from Willow Springs, Missouri to MLMs land in the Current River Valley in exchange for a guaranteed minimum amount of lumber shipments. A five-year agreement between the companies in February 1887 specified that MLM would ship all its lumber going west of the Mississippi on the KFS&M or its affiliates. The MLM also agree to have a mill operational by the time the line was complete. The spur, organized as the Current River Railroad was completed in 1888. Later that year, the Cape Girardeau Southwestern Railroad extended a line from the east allowing the mill to more directly supply eastern markets as well. The Cape Girardeau line met the Current River line in Hunter, Missouri, about 5 mi (8.0 km) from the Current River terminus at the MLM mill site.

MLM established an operation ten miles south of White's mill on Toliver Pond. The pond was a flooded 3.5-acre (1.4 ha) sinkhole which could hold 500,000 ft (150,000 m) (Note: American Lumberman estimate in 1903, 2,000,000 ft (610,000 m) were actually recovered from the pond in 1909 but it is not clear if this includes sunken logs) of logs waiting to be milled. The location, near the upper Little Black River, was connected via river valley to other large timber holdings at Beaver Dam Creek. White's mill was dismantled and moved to the new location. A locomotive was brought to the site from Williamsville where it was dismantled and hauled by ox-teams the final 22 miles (35 km) along with other machinery and enough iron rails to build 6-mile (9.7 km) of logging railroad. The effort was "unprecedented" and culminated in a $250,000 complex of mills and kilns.

== Grandin ==
Just west of the complex, MLM established the new town of Grandin, named after company founder E.B. Grandin. The company had 175 employees in 1889, including locals and skilled workers such as sawyers recruited from outside the region. This location, an unincorporated private company town was the company headquarters for about twenty years.

The town was planned by a company architect/engineer with a main street that had the company store, a hospital, hotel and other commercial buildings, surrounded by large lawns and decorative landscaping. Residential streets were laid out for up to 1000 houses. Just outside of town were a railway roundhouse, blacksmith and other machine shops. Between the town and the mills on the east was an 80 acres (32 ha) lumberyard. The headquarters building was the town's financial center where employees were paid monthly on the tenth. It had a vault and teller booth. (Note: still present in 1980)

== Prosperity ==
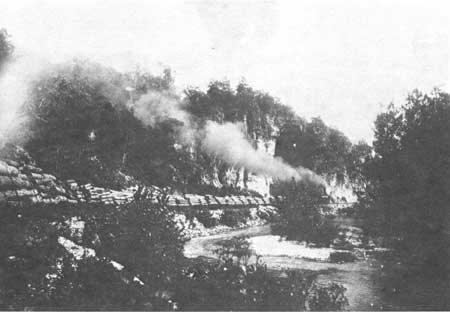
MLM log train, c. 1910

There were six million board feet of lumber in the Grandin yard waiting to be shipped when the railroad arrived in June 1888. Production reached 32 million board feet in 1892 and averaged 60 million annually after 1895. More mills, both saw and planing, were added in 1892 and in 1894 it was asserted, by at least one local newspaper, to be the largest mill (by production) in the country.

MLM used an extensive network of tram railways, built with standard gauge track, 300 log cars and 6 locomotives to move logs to the mill. Using standard gauge allowed the log cars to be transported the final leg to the mill over the Current Railroad tracks. It also floated logs on rivers and streams, primarily the Current River. Above Chicopee, where the Current River Railroad crossed the river, mules dragged logs to the bank where they were floated downstream in flotillas up to 15 miles (24 km) long. At Chicopee, the logs were dragged out of the river and loaded onto railcars.

Only trees measuring 11 inches (28 cm) in diameter or greater were felled. The largest were nearly four feet. All logs were left to soak in Toliver Pond for several days before sawing to remove dirt that would dull saw blades. Logs were brought from the pond to the saws by conveyor. The mills included circular, band, and head saws driven by steam power. In addition to dimensional lumber, the mills produced shingles and lath.

The company marketed its pine as "Beaver Dam Soft Pine", after Beaver Dam Creek, and used a beaver as its trademark. The name became well known throughout the U.S. lumber market. MLM lumber was sold from Ohio westward into the plains states, with most being sold west of the Mississippi; half of its 1901 production went to Kansas City lumber dealers.

In 1890, White became president of the Southern Lumber Manufactures' Association, which worked to negotiate better rates with the railroads, standardize lumber grading and prices. A year later, White moved his office from the company headquarters in Grandin to Kansas City where other big lumber companies were located. White consolidated the region's lumber industry in 1897 as leader of the Missouri Land and Lumber Exchange, a cartel which set production and prices. The company was so powerful that it was able to raise lumber prices ten times in 1899 and control lumber prices nationwide.

The company grew and had approximately 1000 employees in Grandin in 1900, and peaked at 1500 five years later. One out of every six Carter County residents worked for the company. The company recruited skilled workers from other regions of the country that also had large timber operations and used mostly locals for unskilled work.

Smaller operations were located in Hunter (named after founder Jahu Hunter) and Fremont, both located on the Current River Railroad.

== Company town ==
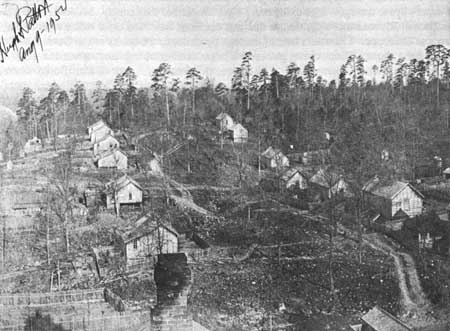
MLM houses in Grandin, Missouri, c. 1910

In addition to the headquarters building and other commercial and service structures in Grandin, MLM built homes that it rented to employees with families. Over 475 houses were built, which it rented for $1 per room per month. Many were two-story, with painted weatherboard siding, and gable roofs. These houses were two room-wide, one room-deep rectangular structures, often with front porches and rear lean-tos added.

Single women were housed in a company-owned boarding house, where the company could maintain "its vision of morality". There were also two boarding houses for men. The boarding house rent was $18 per month including meals. Most single men lived in more primitive shacks or cabins that rented for $2 - $2.50 per month. Initially, they were pre-fabricated and transported to Grandin by railcar. Larger homes for company officials and supervisors rented for $5 - $10 monthly. The company hotel had few guests and was mostly used for employee housing.

MLM's control of all housing in Grandin meant it had significant influence in the company town. It provided assistance to widows of men killed on the job for up to two years in most cases. The company acted to some extent as if the people of Grandin were its dependents. However, its decisions were not made without regard to maintaining profitability. MLM constructed a sidewalk on the town main street in 1906 to aid commerce in the company stores, but it refused to add sidewalks on residential side streets. The company also built the town's school and was involved in its operation, with company officials usually filling the role of school board president and approving the hiring of teachers and other important decisions. It brought telephone service to the town to improve the company's communications efficiency. A line connected Grandin with the county seat of Centerville. MLM initially refused to allow phones in private homes but later relented. Other amenities provided by the company included a library and churches of various denominations. Church support include paying the salary of the ministers. Various other social organization were supported by the company, such as the Knights of King Arthur, to "promote a healthy and productive workforce". It supported recreation facilities, baseball teams, and even an ice-skating rink.

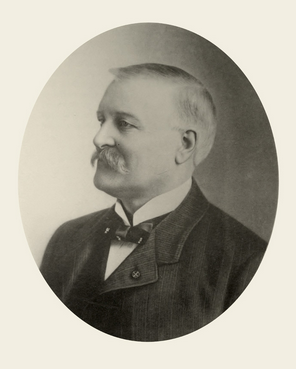
White in 1905

From around 1890, MLM staffed a small hospital with doctors to maintain the health and productivity of its workers and their families. Funded by a monthly fee ($0.75 for single workers and $1.25 for those with families, collected from each employee), the clinic provided unlimited health care. MLM was a pioneer of company-sponsored health care. The clinic grew to a staff of ten, including a dentist. The company even provided a small mobile health facility, moved on railroad flatcar, to take health care into the work camps in the forest. Serious injuries and deaths were not uncommon, particularly among railroad workers.

Although the majority of positions were held by men, the MLM used many women as stenographers and clerks, putting the company "in the forefront of the feminization of office work" in the 1890s. The company required character references for all workers. Grandin's population peaked at 2,500 to 3,000 people, 1,200 directly employed by MLM.

== Decline ==
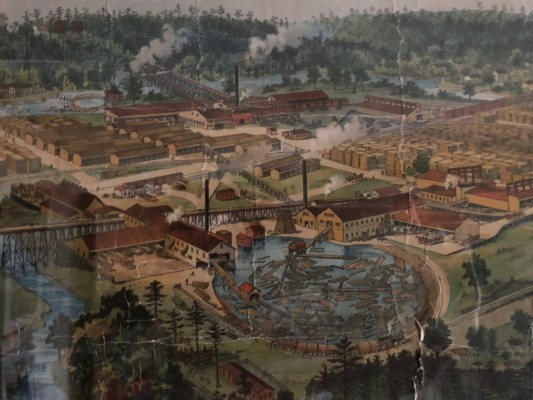
MLM mill complex in Grandin, Missouri, 1903

The Grandin mill was ranked as the world's largest by capacity in 1900 & 1901, with the ability to produce 75 million board feet per year, although the most it ever produced was just under 66 million in 1901. Production fell rapidly, reaching about 37,000,000 board feet in 1904. A fire in 1905 destroyed a secondary mill, after which the main mill started 24-hour operation, which used 90 rail cars per day of logs.

Over time, it became more difficult to purchase timberland and to cut timber at profitable prices. Land prices increased rapidly when local landowners became aware of the value of their trees. It was important for timberland to be near the railroad as the cost of extending logging tramlines through the difficult terrain was estimated at $1,000 per mile

Much of the timber in the county was cut with the land being then repurposed for agriculture. The industry did not manage the forests to support future harvest. Missouri tax law discouraged this as it taxed cut and uncut land at the same rate; it was not profitable to replant and wait decades for a new crop. The land had to be sold after the initial harvest. Except for heightened output during World War II, yearly production in the region declined until the 1960s.

By 1900, there were few trees left near the Grandin mill and operations moved northward. Land acquisitions were primarily in Shannon County. The new owner of the KSF&M, the St. Louis and San Francisco Railway offered a reduced rate for lumber shipped from northwest Shannon County. MLM built the Grandin and Northwestern Railroad to connect the Current Railroad to its logging camp in Shannon County, more than 60 miles (97 km) from Grandin. By 1906, the company began to plan for leaving Grandin. The mill was only operating four days per week in late 1907. Even with SLSF's discounted shipping rate, the shipping costs were still too high to ship logs from Shannon County to Grandin for processing, especially after lumber prices fell during the recession of 1907. With the supply of nearby trees diminishing rapidly over the next several years, the last logs in the area were cut in 1909 and the mill was closed in 1910. The mill and many of the houses in Grandin were moved to the new mill location which became West Eminence. The last stockholder meeting in Grandin was in September 1910. The company disposed of the remaining homes and lots in Grandin for $50 - $100, most being sold to individuals.

MLM operations continued at West Eminence and Hunter for around another ten years. The company owners also owned timberland in Louisiana, and was considering buying land in the Pacific Northwest, however operations in other states were conducted with different companies including the Louisiana Central Lumber Company and Grandin Coast Lumber Company (of Seattle). MLM's operations in the state ended in 1919 when it sold the West Eminence mill.

MLM had more deforested land than it could sell and was still disposing of land into the 1930s. At one time, MLM considering donating land to the federal government to establish a national park.

== Historic resources ==
During the period the Missouri Lumber and Mining Company was active in Grandin, it contributed significantly both to the Missouri timber industry and the national economy, employing technology of a state and scale never before seen in the Ozark region. The surviving structures associated with the company in Grandin were listed on the National Register of Historic Places as examples of the theme of technology as outlined in the "Missouri's State Historic Preservation Plan".

The historic resources of the MLM were listed on the National Register in 1980. Included are Toliver Pond and 29 buildings constructed during the company's presence in Grandin between 1888 and 1909. There are 29 buildings, six of which are close together and listed as the Sixth Street Historic District.

The six houses in the historic district are listed under the reference number of the district, while the pond and other 23 buildings are listed under individual numbers. However, all 30 places are described only in the MLM Historic Resources Multiple Property Submission for the thematic nomination; there are no further detailed nomination forms for any of the places. (Note: The MPS form discusses 37 places, but the inventory list shows seven houses were stricken without rewriting the text. The inventory numbers the places 1..37, with 2, 21, 22, 23, 26, 32, & 34 stricken. The "Site Distribution Map" has shows only numbers 1-28; 29-37 are missing)

Name	Image	Reference Number	Location	Description
Mrs. Louis Bedell House		80002324	3rd & Maple Sts. 36.831944°N 90.820833°W	A two-story, vernacular frame dwelling with a gable roof and weatherboard siding and one-story wing. The building contains 12 rooms and a wraparound porch with an enclosed railing. It was originally known as Whitehall and used as the women's boarding house.
Earl Boyer House		80002325	5th & Maple Sts. 36.828626°N 90.821721°W	A one-story, vernacular frame dwelling with a front porch, lean-to in back, and composition siding.
J. W. Gibson House (Note: Satellite imagery in 2020 shows a vacant lot)		80002326	6th & Pine Sts. 36.830786°N 90.829077°W	A one-story, vernacular frame dwelling with an extra gabled wing in back and lean-to porch in front. The exterior walls are treated with shingle siding.
Delia Greensfelder House		80002327	4th & Cherry Sts. 36.830127°N 90.822283°W	A one-story, vernacular frame dwelling with a front porch, lean-to in back, and weatherboard siding
Loretta Herrington House		80002328	5th * Cherry Sts. 36.829095°N 90.822659°W	A two-story, vernacular frame dwelling with a front porch and shingle siding.
James Hinton House		80002329	1st & Walnut Sts. 36.833513°N 90.819837°W	A two-story, vernacular frame dwelling with a front porch, lean-to in back and gable roof. The walls have shingle siding.
Nettie Jacobson House		80002330	6th and Oak Sts. 36.830437°N 90.827359°W	A one-story, vernacular frame dwelling with a front porch, lean-to in back, and weatherboard siding.
Nola Kitterman House		80002331	6th & Poplar Sts. 36.831723°N 90.831127°W	A one-story, vernacular frame dwelling with a front porch, lean-to in back, and shingle siding.
Wallace Knapp House		80002332	6th & Elm Sts. 36.830186°N 90.826767°W	A one-story, vernacular frame dwelling with a front porch, lean-to in back, and shingle siding.
Buford Lawhorn House		80002333	6th & Pine Sts. 36.831153°N 90.828778°W	A one-story, vernacular frame dwelling with a screened-in front porch and garage added on the west. The walls are treated with shingle siding.
Iva Lewis House		80002334	6th & Pine Sts. 36.830561°N 90.828553°W	A one-story, vernacular frame dwelling with a front porch and shingle siding. There is an extension on the west, covered with white composition siding.
Masonic Lodge		80002335	5th and Elm Sts. 36.830424°N 90.825821°W	A two-story, rectangular, vernacular frame building with a small, one story addition in the rear. The exterior is treated with white painted weatherboard, and the gables are decorated with stickwork. Interior walls are treated with pine paneling. The building's foundation is of local stone and concrete blocks. The building was the company office building, constructed in 1889 from local pine. It contained twelve rooms, the ones on the first floor elegantly finished with pine paneling. It was donated in 1910 to the Masonic lodge and was used from 1920 to 1959 by the Bank of Grandin. Grandin lodge No. 579 now meets in another building.
Terry Mays House		80002336	6th & Plum Sts. 36.829009°N 90.824136°W	A one-story, vernacular frame dwelling with shingle siding and small, gable roofed front porch.
Thornton McNew House		80002337	6th & Spruce Sts. 36.831570°N 90.829862°W	A one-story, vernacular frame dwelling with a lean-to in back and shingle siding.
Toliver Pond (Mill Pond)		80002338	East 3rd St. 36.831485°N 90.812962°W	A natural spring-fed pond covers, about 3.5 acres (1.4 ha) and 60 ft (18 m) deep.
Della Nance House		80002339	6th & Pine St. 36.830931°N 90.828427°W	A one-story, vernacular frame dwelling with an enclosed porch and extra wing on the west. The walls are treated with composition board.
Hazel Owens House		80002340	5th & Pine Sts. 36.831487°N 90.828022°W	A two-story, "L"-plan, vernacular frame dwelling with a gable roof and weatherboard siding. There is a screened-in front porch. It was the company hotel and retains its hotel-like appearance and still has 22 interior rooms.
Ernie Phillips House		80002341	3rd & Cherry Sts. 36.831488°N 90.822229°W	A one-story, vernacular frame dwelling with a gable roof and weatherboard siding. The west side has been extended by about ten feet.
Alvis Powers House		80002342	2nd & Walnut Sts. 36.832828°N 90.820358°W	A two-story, vernacular frame dwelling with a front porch, lean-to in back, gable roof and weatherboard, and composition board siding.
Hazel Shoat House		80002343	5th & Oak Sts. 36.830902°N 90.826942°W	A 1 1/2-story, vernacular frame dwelling with an enclosed, gable roofed front porch and large wing in back. The roof is gabled, and the walls are sided with weatherboard.
Sixth Street Historic District		80002344	6th St., from Pine to Elm Sts. 36.829444°N 90.826667°W	Six consecutive houses. See below for individual descriptions.
James Smith House		80002345	6th & Cherry Sts. 36.828639°N 90.823399°W	A one-story, vernacular frame dwelling with weatherboard siding, a lean-to room and porch.
Lawrence Smith House		80002346	3rd & Walnut Sts. 36.831936°N 90.819843°W	A two-story, vernacular frame dwelling with a one-story wing, gable roof, and shingle siding.
William F. Smith House		80002347	6th & Ash Sts. 36.828995°N 90.825197°W	A one-story, vernacular frame dwelling with a front porch and weatherboard siding.
Lee Tucker House		80002348	3rd St. 36.832538°N 90.825146°W	A one-story, vernacular frame dwelling with a lean-to in back, a gable roof, and weatherboard siding.

=== Sixth Street Historic District ===
The following houses make up the Sixth Street Historic District:

Name	Image	Location	Description
John Rongey House		6th and Oak Sts. 36.830149°N 90.827544°W	A two-story, vernacular frame dwelling with weatherboard siding, gable roof, and lean-to in back. A porch encloses the north and west sides.
Joe Deaton House		6th St. 36.829880°N 90.827240°W	A one-story, vernacular frame dwelling enlarged by the addition of a gabled wing (possibly another one story cabin). The house is sided with weatherboard, and has a front porch.
Clarence Graham House		6th and Elm Sts. 36.829797°N 90.826872°W	A two-story, vernacular frame dwelling with weatherboard siding, front porch, and one story wing in back. Roofs are gabled and of corrugated metal.
Everett Nance House		6th and Elm Sts. 36.829523°N 90.826564°W	A two-story, vernacular frame dwelling with gable roof and weatherboard siding. There is a one-story front porch and a two-story addition on the southwest corner.
Cynthia McKinney House		6th St. (between Ash & Elm); 36.829513°N 90.826201°W	A two-story, vernacular frame dwelling with gable roof, weatherboard siding, and two-story gabled wing in back.
Bill McDowell House		6th and Ash Sts. 36.829314°N 90.825760°W	A two-story, vernacular frame dwelling with weatherboard siding, gable roof, front porch, and lean-to in back.

== Map ==
Listed buildings in Missouri Mining and Lumber Company Historic Resources
Purple indicates commercial building
Blue indicates pond
Red indicates Sixth Street Historic District house
Green indicates other house
1 Mrs. Louis Bedell House (Whitehall, the women's boarding house)
2 Earl Boyer House
3 J. W. Gibson House
4 Delia Greensfelder House
5 Loretta Herrington House
6 James Hinton House
7 Nettie Jacobson House
8 Nola Kitterman House
9 Wallace Knapp House
10 Buford Lawhorn House
11 Iva Lewis House
12 Masonic Lodge (company headquarters building)
13 Terry Mays House
14 Thornton McNew House
15 Toliver Pond
16 Della Nance House
17 Hazel Owens House (company hotel)
18 Ernie Phillips House
19 Alvis Powers House
20 Hazel Shoat House
21 John Rongey House
22 Joe Deaton House
23 Clarence Graham House
24 Everett Nance House
25 Cynthia McKinney House
26 Bill McDowell House
27 James Smith House
28 Lawrence Smith House
29 William F. Smith House
30 Lee Tucker House
