= House Creek Township, Wake County, North Carolina =

Township in Wake County, North Carolina, U.S.

Coordinates: 35.8667777°N 78.6682395°W

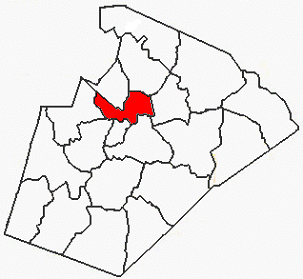

House Creek Township (also designated Township 7) is one of twenty townships within Wake County, North Carolina, United States. As of the 2010 United States census, House Creek Township had a population of 57,439, an 11.0% increase over 2000.

House Creek Township, occupying 22.0 square miles (57.1 km^{2}) in north-central Wake County, is almost completely occupied by portions of the city of Raleigh.
