= House Creek (Chattahoochee River tributary) =

- Location within Georgia Location within the United States

Physical characteristics
- Source
  - coordinates: 32.8529075°N 84.9777126°W
- Mouth
  - coordinates: 32.7801310°N 85.1168829°W

House Creek is a stream in the U.S. state of Georgia. It is a tributary to the Chattahoochee River.

House Creek was named for a dwelling house along its course. A variant name was "Old House Creek".
