= Grandin, Missouri =

City in Carter County, Missouri, United States

- City
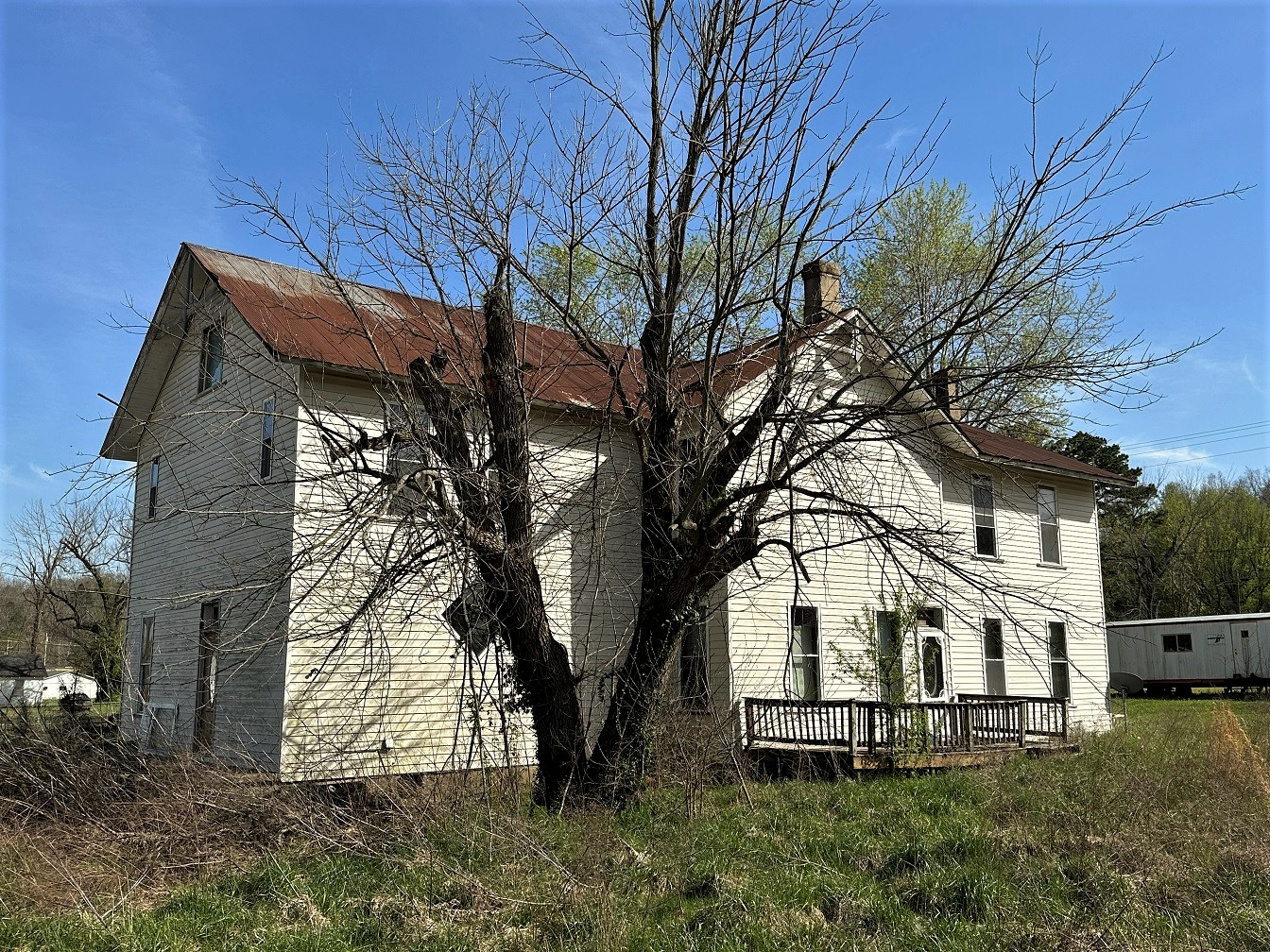
- The former Masonic Lodge in 2024

- Location of Grandin, Missouri
- Coordinates: 36°49′51″N 90°49′19″W
- Country: United States
- State: Missouri
- County: Carter

Area
  - Total: 0.40 sq mi (1.04 km^{2})
  - Land: 0.40 sq mi (1.04 km^{2})
  - Water: 0 sq mi (0.00 km^{2})
- Elevation: 581 ft (177 m)

Population (2020)
  - Total: 226
  - Density: 564/sq mi (217.9/km^{2})
- Time zone: UTC-6 (Central (CST))
  - Summer (DST): UTC-5 (CDT)
- ZIP code: 63943
- Area code: 573
- FIPS code: 29-28180
- GNIS feature ID: 2394956

Grandin is a city in Carter County, Missouri, United States. The population was 226 at the 2020 census.

== History ==
Grandin was platted in 1910 on the site of the Missouri Lumber and Mining Company's company town which dates back to the late 1880s. The community was named after E. B. Grandin, a businessperson in the local lumber industry. A post office has been in operation at Grandin since 1887.

Twenty-four individual buildings, the Mill Pond, and the Sixth Street Historic District were listed on the National Register of Historic Places in 1980.

== Geography ==
Grandin is located at 36°49′47″N 90°49′24″W.

According to the United States Census Bureau, the city has a total area of 0.40 square miles (1.04 km^{2}), all land.

== Demographics ==
Historical population
Census	Pop.	Note	%±
1890	579		—
1930	309		—
1940	294		−4.9%
1950	263		−10.5%
1960	259		−1.5%
1970	243		−6.2%
1980	265		9.1%
1990	233		−12.1%
2000	236		1.3%
2010	243		3.0%
2020	226		−7.0%
U.S. Decennial Census

=== 2010 census ===
As of the census of 2010, there were 243 people, 102 households, and 60 families living in the city. The population density was 607.5 inhabitants per square mile (234.6/km^{2}). There were 121 housing units at an average density of 302.5 per square mile (116.8/km^{2}). The racial makeup of the city was 99.59% White and 0.41% Native American. Hispanic or Latino of any race were 2.06% of the population.

There were 102 households, of which 35.3% had children under the age of 18 living with them, 39.2% were married couples living together, 15.7% had a female householder with no husband present, 3.9% had a male householder with no wife present, and 41.2% were non-families. 36.3% of all households were made up of individuals, and 7.8% had someone living alone who was 65 years of age or older. The average household size was 2.38 and the average family size was 3.15.

The median age in the city was 37.6 years. 28% of residents were under the age of 18; 11.2% were between the ages of 18 and 24; 22.3% were from 25 to 44; 23.5% were from 45 to 64; and 15.2% were 65 years of age or older. The gender makeup of the city was 50.6% male and 49.4% female.

=== 2000 census ===
As of the census of 2000, there were 236 people, 90 households, and 64 families living in the city. The population density was 592.2 inhabitants per square mile (228.6/km^{2}). There were 119 housing units at an average density of 298.6 per square mile (115.3/km^{2}). The racial makeup of the city was 97.88% White, 1.27% Native American, and 0.85% from two or more races.

There were 90 households, out of which 30.0% had children under the age of 18 living with them, 54.4% were married couples living together, 13.3% had a female householder with no husband present, and 27.8% were non-families. 23.3% of all households were made up of individuals, and 6.7% had someone living alone who was 65 years of age or older. The average household size was 2.56 and the average family size was 2.97.

In the city the population was spread out, with 26.3% under the age of 18, 7.6% from 18 to 24, 31.8% from 25 to 44, 20.8% from 45 to 64, and 13.6% who were 65 years of age or older. The median age was 35 years. For every 100 females, there were 105.2 males. For every 100 females age 18 and over, there were 97.7 males.

The median income for a household in the city was $19,844, and the median income for a family was $22,500. Males had a median income of $20,417 versus $21,429 for females. The per capita income for the city was $10,497. About 24.2% of families and 28.6% of the population were below the poverty line, including 38.0% of those under the age of eighteen and 23.1% of those 65 or over.

== Education ==
Grandin has a lending library, a branch of the Carter County Library.

== See also ==
- List of cities in Missouri
