= West Eminence, Missouri =

Unincorporated community in Missouri, U.S.

Coordinates: 37°08′25″N 91°22′28″W

West Eminence is an unincorporated community in Shannon County, in the U.S. state of Missouri.

== History ==
A post office called West Eminence was established in 1910, and remained in operation until 1957. The community lies west of Eminence, hence the name.
