= Mill Pond (Grandin, Missouri) =

- U.S. National Register of Historic Places
- Location within Missouri Location within the United States
- Location: Off MO 21, Grandin, Missouri
- Coordinates: 36°49′53″N 90°48′46″W
- Area: 0 acres (0 ha)
- MPS: Missouri Lumber and Mining Company MRA
- NRHP reference No.: 80002338
- Added to NRHP: October 14, 1980

Mill Pond, also known as Toliver Pond, is a historic natural pond located at Grandin, Carter County, Missouri. It is approximately 180 meters east of Grandin city limits at 3rd Street. The pond covers about 3 1/2 acres, is spring fed, and is about 60 feet deep.

It was listed on the National Register of Historic Places in 1980.
