= Carter County, Missouri =

County in Missouri, United States

- County
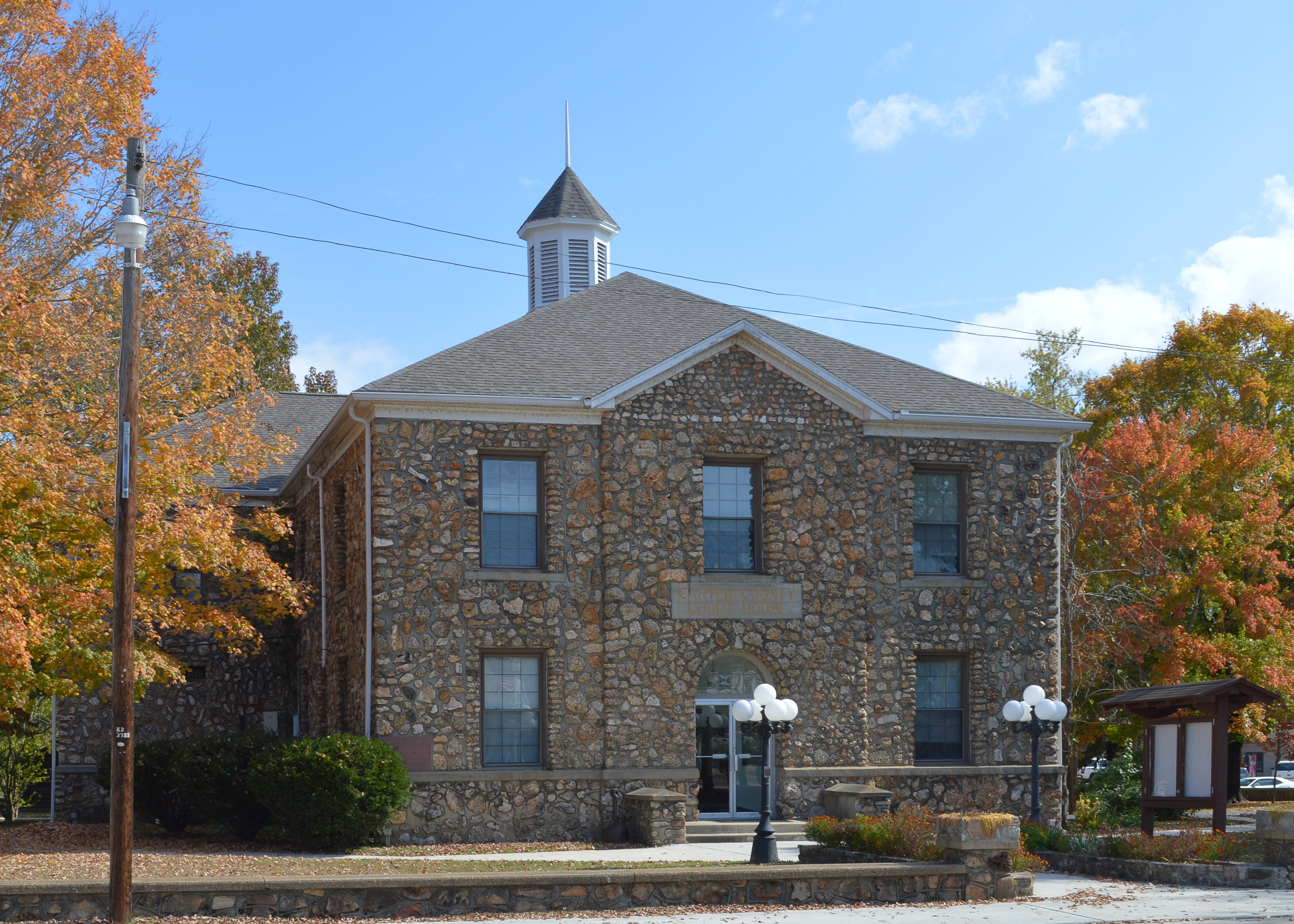
- Carter County Courthouse in Van Buren

- Location within the U.S. state of Missouri
- Coordinates: 36°56′N 90°58′W
- Country: United States
- State: Missouri
- Founded: March 10, 1859
- Named for: Zimri A. Carter, a pioneer settler who came to Missouri from South Carolina in 1812
- Seat: Van Buren
- Largest city: Van Buren

Area
  - Total: 509 sq mi (1,320 km^{2})
  - Land: 507 sq mi (1,310 km^{2})
  - Water: 1.7 sq mi (4.4 km^{2})

Population (2020)
  - Total: 5,202
  - Estimate (2025): 5,418 ▲
  - Density: 10/sq mi (3.9/km^{2})
- Time zone: UTC−6 (Central)
  - Summer (DST): UTC−5 (CDT)
- Congressional district: 8th

Carter County is a county in the Ozarks of Missouri. At the 2020 census, it had a population of 5,202. The largest city and county seat is Van Buren. The county was officially organized on March 10, 1859, and is named after Zimri A. Carter, a pioneer settler who came to Missouri from South Carolina in 1812.

== History ==
=== Creation ===
When the Missouri legislature created Carter County on March 10, 1859, it named the county after Zimri A. Carter.

Zimri A. Carter (1794–1872) was born in South Carolina. In 1807, at the age of 13, he came to Missouri with his parents. The Carter family initially settled in what is now Warren County. Shortly after his arrival in Missouri Carter joined up with a party of traders traveling the Missouri and Mississippi rivers in flat boats, and was away for a number of years. In his absence his father Benjamin Carter traded a horse and a cow for a large tract of land in what was then Wayne County, about eight miles southeast of where the town of Van Buren would eventually be established. When Carter returned from his trading ventures he joined his father in farming their new homestead. (Various sources give dates as early as 1812 and as late as 1820 for Zimri Carter's arrival in the area.) Carter became one of the most influential and respected men in southeast Missouri and was instrumental in bringing about the creation of Carter County and served for a time as county judge of Carter County. The Carters were soon followed by other families: the Chilton, Kenard, Snider and Kelly families, who, along with the Carters opened up large tracts of wilderness land.

Carter County was created from portions of Ripley, Shannon and Wayne counties. On the first Monday of April 1859, three men (Adam Lane of Ripley County, John Bulford of Reynolds County and D.C. Reed of Shannon County) met at the home of James Brown to select a seat for the newly created Carter County. They selected Van Buren which, until 1847, had been the county seat of Ripley County. At the time of its creation, Carter County was attached to Ripley County for the purpose of representation in the General Assembly. The old log-cabin courthouse, which had been erected in Van Buren in 1853, continued to be used as the Carter County Courthouse until it was replaced by a wood-frame building in 1867.

William Lawson was the first person elected to the Missouri legislature from Carter County in 1864 and served until 1870, at which time he was succeeded by F.M. Coleman.

Initially Carter County had only one voting precinct, and all voting was done at the county courthouse in Van Buren. In June 1868 the court ordered that Carter County be divided into two precincts, with Precinct #1 consisting of the western half of the county where voting was done in the courthouse, and Precinct #2 in the eastern half with voting taking place at the home of John Carnahan on the head of the middle fork of Brushy Creek. By 1895, at the height of the timber boom, Carter County had as many as ten precincts.

The 1860 U.S. Census showed the newly created Carter County with a population of 1,197 free persons and 20 slaves held by eight slave owners. The 1920 U.S. census showed a peak population for Carter County of 7,482. The population then declined until it reached a low of 3,878 in the 1970 U.S. Census. The population has since risen steadily. As of the 2010 U.S. census, the county's population was 6,265.

=== Civil War ===
The U.S. Civil War began about two years after Carter County was established. At the time most of the people in Carter County were southern sympathizers and supporters of the Confederate States of America. The Union Army of Southeast Missouri was encamped in the area during the winter of 1862–63, and Carter County saw a number of local skirmishes, but by the war's end it had suffered only minimal property damage.

On August 12, 1862, the 24th Missouri Infantry (Union) under the command of Colonel Boyd surprised six rebel soldiers near Van Buren. In the ensuing skirmish two of the rebel soldiers were killed and another three captured. In the course of events one mill and three houses were burned. Also taken was a packet of rebel mail that was being sent from the camp of Confederate general James McBride to Potosi, Missouri, telling of his plans to take Greenville.

In September 1862 Rebel forces under the command of Colonel David C. Boone, who had been in Southeast Missouri recruiting troops for the Confederacy, was driven from Reynolds County into Carter County by elements of the 12th Cavalry MSM. About a month later, the Union authorities finally discovered the location of Colonel David C. Boone's forces in Carter County. Lieutenant Colonel Bazel F. Lazear was sent into Carter County with forces of the 12th Cavalry MSN to drive them out. During the evening of October 22, 1862, Lt. Colonel Bazel F. Lazear's forces surprised the estimated 450 well armed Confederate troops under the command of Colonel David C. Boone, driving them through the town of Van Buren. On October 25, 1862, Boone's forces were once again discovered, this time near Pike Creek in western Carter County. Attacking the Rebel forces from a nearby hill, the Union forces killed eight and captured 16 of the Rebels. Altogether, the Union forces under Colonel Bazel F. Lazear captured a total of 40 Rebel troops on this expedition, who were subsequently sent to military prisons in St. Louis. The total Union loss was only one man.

From December 1862 to January 1863 Union General John W Davidson, en route to the south with a force of about 3000 troops, camped near Van Buren. At the same time, coming from the south and moving north were a number of Confederate troops under the command of General Jeff Thompson, who had, unknown to the Union forces, camped not far away on top of Barren Hill. Discovering the presence of the Union forces the next day they surprised a company of Union troops as they were loading supplies they had purchased from local farms. After a battle that lasted about an hour the Union forces were forced to retreat, leaving their wagons and supplies behind. One Confederate soldier was killed and about twenty-five wounded. After treating their wounded and loading them into the wagons, the southern forces retreated westward toward Pike Creek that afternoon. General Davidson then sent out a force of about 400 men in an effort to capture General Thompson, but they were unable to find him. Two Union soldiers died of their wound in this battle.

By far, most of the death and destruction in Carter County did not come at the hand of either Union or Confederate troops, but from bands of outlaws known as Jayhawkers and Bushwhackers respectively depending on whether they sympathized with the north of the south. Many of these outlaw bands were composed of native Carter County residents who were taking advantage of the war to settle personal grudges. Thomas Gardner, the first elected sheriff of Carter County was killed by one of these native outlaw bands.

==== Carterville ====
One local history describes a short lived community of freed slaves that arose about two miles south of Van Buren after the Civil War. Because of its location near the Carter Homestead this community came to be known as Carterville. This community included not only freed slaves from Carter County but also many from surrounding regions. Their first winter was one of suffering, and disease killed many of them. Their graveyard is located in a little field at the mouth of Water Hollow about one and a half mile below Van Buren on the banks of the Current River.

=== Timber industry ===
The Missouri Lumber and Mining Company, more than any other entity was for many years to shape the economic, cultural, and ecologic landscape of Carter County.

The Missouri Lumber and Mining Company moved into Carter County in 1887 and made it for many years the primary lumber production center of Missouri. Shipping a sawmill by rail to Williamsville, which at the time was the end of the line, it was then hauled by wagons into Carter County, to a site that was selected because of a large natural pond known as Tolliver Pond. There on land that was originally patented by William A Simms in 1857 the Missouri Lumber and Mining Company in 1887 laid out and founded the town of Grandin, naming it for the principle stockholder in the company.

The Missouri Lumber and Mining Company also brought the railroad into Carter County when in 1887 they granted the Current River branch of the Frisco Railroad a right-of-way across their land. The rail line to Grandin was finished two years later in 1889, and the first regular train service to the new born town of Grandin ran on July 3 that same year.

In order to feed the giant sawmill it had established in Carter County, which required logs from 70 acres of land each day to keep it running, the Missouri Lumber and Mining Company laid down miles of narrow gauge railroads that radiated outward beyond Carter County and into neighboring Reynolds, Wayne, Butler, Ripley and Shannon counties. At its peak the sawmills in Carter County produced in excess of 60 to 70 million board feet of lumber each year.

In 1900 the timber boom in Carter County was in full stride.

By 1909 much of the virgin pine forest in and around Carter County had been cut down.

In 1910 the lumber boom ended when the Grandin mill whistle blew for the last time.

By 1911 all the equipment had been moved to the new mill at West Eminence in Shannon County, leaving behind an economically and ecologically devastated landscape.

=== Mid-Continent Iron Company ===
In 1917 Frank Larabee, E. H. Busick and others came to Carter County and formed the Mid-Continent Iron Company. After purchasing property about two miles north of Fremont they established a smelter with the intention of producing pig iron from ore shipped from Michigan. By November 1918 the plant was ready for production.

A town named Midco, after the Mid-Continent Iron Company, arose as people moved into the area first to build the smelter and afterward to work at the plant. At its peak in 1920 the town had in excess of 3000 inhabitants, which was about half of the entire population of Carter County at the time.

Like the Missouri Lumber and Mining Company before it, the Mid-Continent Iron Company built its own railroad system to transport the wood needed to fire the blast furnace. While the Missouri Lumber and Mining Company harvested the virgin pine forests, the Mid-Continent Iron Company harvested the hardwoods from which to make the charcoal they needed to operate their blast furnace. Typically 180 cords of wood a day was converted into charcoal to operate the furnace. The company had two small and five larger locomotives running on their railroad system to haul the wood to their plant.

At the outbreak of World War I the U. S. government demanded that a modern chemical plant be installed at Midco. They wanted the byproducts coming from the wood as it was being converted to charcoal, byproducts such as wood alcohol, tar, calcium acetate and other wood oils. Thus in addition to the iron works, Midco became the site of a sprawling chemical plant.

The global flu pandemic of 1918-1920 hit the community of Midco in some cases wiping out whole families. At its peak there were two crews digging graves day and night. Of the 100-200 victims of the flu buried in the Midco Cemetery only 6 have tombstones.

With the end of World War I there was no longer any demand for the products the company was producing and so in 1921 the Mid-Continent Iron Company closed. With the closing of the plant the people moved away and by 1930 Midco was nearly a ghost town. Today little remains to show that what was once the largest community in Carter County even existed.

=== Post boom years ===
With the loss of the big sawmills of the Missouri Lumber and Mining Company, and the closing of the Mid-Continent Iron Company, the population of Carter County began a decline that did not reverse until about 1970. Many communities, both large and small, that had sprung up in Carter County during the boom years of the lumber industry disappeared. Grandin itself survived but with scarcely a tenth of its former population.

Those who remained behind when the big mills left were forced to eke out a living trying to grow a few crops on the rocky, barren, eroded hills. Free-ranging cattle were left to roam the woods, foraging on acorns and sprouts.

To make matters worse, it was a common practice to burn the wooded areas in the mistaken belief that the fire would kill ticks and make grass grow. Paul Dunn, a District Forester who worked in the area in the 1920s and 1930s once reported that at least 75 percent of the land outside of state parks were burned off twice a year.

By 1938, Grandin's population had fallen to 300, a tenth of its 1900 population, and the Frisco Railroad gave notice that it would be discontinuing its service to Grandin. However, that same year news was also received that a new state highway would be routed through Carter County, passing through the town of Grandin.

=== Conservation and reforestation ===
In 1910, John Barber White, who was one of the principles of the Missouri Lumber and Mining Company, took Gifford Pinchot of the U.S. Forest Service on a tour of the over cut forests and urged him, in the interest of conservation, to establish a national forest in the Missouri Ozarks. But it was not until 1933 that the Mark Twain National Forest, which includes parts of Carter County, was established.

In 1928 the Missouri General Assembly authorized the creation of a Department of Forestry to which Fredrick Dunlap was appointed as State forester, and Paul Dunn made a District Forester in for the region including Carter County. Paul Dunn in an effort to educate the people in the Carter and the surrounding counties in proper forest management took a single film titled “Trees of Righteousness,” and with his Model-T, a movie projector and a generator went from school district to school district, showing the film, and wearing out five copies of it in the process.

But the situation was so bad that in 1931 State Forester Fredrick Dunlap declared that stopping the forest fires in the Ozarks was an impossibility, and the Governor vetoed funding and abolished the Forestry Department. By the mid-1930s the ecological devastation left behind by the timber boom reached its all-time low. The forests were burned, sediment eroding from once forested hillsides choked once clear streams. It was estimated that only 2000 deer and a few scattered flocks of turkeys remained in the entire state.

In 1936 Missouri voters approved the creation of a Conservation Commission which included a forestry department. In 1938 George O. White was made State Forester and following in the footsteps of Paul Dunn he took a truck equipped with a movie projector, screen and generator and showed forestry movies throughout the Ozark hill county. And for 12 years these movies were shown wherever an audience was to be found, indoors and outdoors, in schools and churches and stores. And the effort paid off. Attitudes and practices toward land management began to change, the fires stopped, the forests grew back, and deer and turkey are back in record numbers. Where once 75 percent of the land was burned off twice each year, now less than one tenth of one percent burns each year. Once-devastated forests can again be classified as wilderness areas and the timber industry once again flourishes in Carter County.

=== The 1920s through the 1970s ===
The 1920s saw the creation of Big Spring State Park, but more importantly for the county the 1920s also saw the construction of the Cross-State Highway (now U.S. Route 60) and the construction of a permanent bridge across the Current River at Van Buren. The creation of the highway and the state park marked the beginnings of a tourist industry with Smalley's Tourist Camp and the Rose Cliff Hotel serving tourists in the Van Buren area for many years.

The 1930s saw the construction of highway 103 from Van Buren to Big Spring, making access to the state park much easier. That decade also saw the construction of the Jefferson Highway (now State Route 21) in the eastern half of Carter County and which served the towns of Grandin, Hunter, and Ellsinore.

The population of the county continued to drop throughout the 1920s and 1930s simply because there were very few jobs to be had. During the depression years, in an attempt to fight the loss of jobs as many as five Civil Conservation Corps camps were established in the county. Three of these were located in west Carter County near Van Buren and a fourth near Fremont. The fifth was located in east Carter County near Ellsinore.

With the nation's entry into World War II in 1941, the county's population continued to fall as there was a much better chance of finding employment elsewhere. The 1940s also saw the election of a native Carter County resident to the U. S. Congress when A. S. J. Carnahan was elected to the U.S. House of Representatives.

The 1950s saw the town of Fremont devastated by an F4 tornado that was part of the May 1957 Central Plains tornado outbreak. This decade also saw talk of damming the Current River, something that the locals were against. With the closing of the 1950s, Carter County celebrated its centennial.

In 1964 congress authorized the creation of the Ozark National Scenic Riverways and in 1972 Current River became a part of that Riverways system, giving a great boost the Carter County's tourism industry. From the 1970s onward the population of Carter County has steadily increased.

== Geography ==
According to the U.S. Census Bureau, the county has a total area of 509 square miles (1,320 km^{2}), of which 507 square miles (1,310 km^{2}) is land and 1.7 square miles (4.4 km^{2}) (0.3%) is water.

Carter County is in the rugged southern Courtois Hills region of the southeastern Ozark Plateau, and is roughly dissected from north to south by the Current River. Much of the county consists of wooded hills and valleys, with the landscape becoming more rolling and the hills having broader tops and gentler slopes in the southeastern portions of the county. The topography of Carter County is essentially that of a highly dissected plateau.

The western and central sections of the county are drained by the Current River and its tributaries: Rogers Creek, Mill Creek, Pike Creek, Big Barren Creek, Aldridge Valley, Hen Peck Creek and Carters Creek. The eastern section of the county is drained by Cane Creek, Beaver Dam Creek, Little Black and Big Brushy Creek, all of which are tributaries of the Black River.

Stegall Mountain, with an elevation of 1,348 feet, is the highest point in the county. The county's lowest elevations, about 400 feet, may be found in the river valleys on its southern boundary.

The bedrock is mostly (92.3%) Ordovician in age, with 7% being Cambrian and the remainder Precambrian. The weathering of this bedrock has produced an extensive system of solution channels and caves. This has resulted in the creation of numerous springs, with the largest being Big Spring located in the Current River near Van Buren. Some of the larger caves to be found in Carter County are Current River Cave ( located in Missouri Down Under Adventure Zoo), Camp Yarn Cave, Midco Cave, Granite Quarry Cave, and Lost Man's Cave.

Carter County has numerous small deposits of brown iron ore (limonite), and some effort has been made in the past to mine them, but the efforts have generally not been cost effective. The most notable limonite mining effort was at the Orchard Mine near Ellsinore. This mine operated for a ten-year period between 1902 and 1912, and for a time Carter County ranked 16th in the State of Missouri in iron ore production.

The principle geologic formations in Carter County, ranked in order of surface exposure, are:

- Roubidoux (52%), Ordovician
- Gasconade (40%), Ordovician
- Eminence and Potosi (7%), Cambrian
- St. Francois Mountains Volcanic Supergroup (0.5%), Precambrian
- Smithville, Powell, Cotter and Jefferson City dolomites (0.3%), Ordovician
- St Francois Mt. Intrusive Suite (0.1%), Precambrian

=== Adjacent counties ===
- Reynolds County (north)
- Wayne County (northeast)
- Butler County (southeast)
- Ripley County (south)
- Oregon County (southwest)
- Shannon County (west)

=== Major highways ===
- U.S. Route 60

Built mid-1920s. Formerly known as the Cross-State Highway, later as Route 16.

- Route 21

Built early 1930s. Formerly known as the Jefferson Highway.

- Route 34

=== National protected areas ===
- Mark Twain National Forest (part)
- Ozark National Scenic Riverways (part)

== Demographics ==
Historical population
Census	Pop.	Note	%±
1860	1,235		—
1870	1,455		17.8%
1880	2,168		49.0%
1890	4,659		114.9%
1900	6,706		43.9%
1910	5,504		−17.9%
1920	7,482		35.9%
1930	5,503		−26.5%
1940	6,226		13.1%
1950	4,777		−23.3%
1960	3,973		−16.8%
1970	3,878		−2.4%
1980	5,428		40.0%
1990	5,515		1.6%
2000	5,941		7.7%
2010	6,265		5.5%
2020	5,202		−17.0%
2025 (est.)	5,418	▲	4.2%
U.S. Decennial Census; 1790-1960 1900-1990; 1990-2000 2010-2020

=== 2020 census ===
As of the 2020 census, the county had a population of 5,202 and a median age of 46.0 years; 21.7% of residents were under the age of 18 and 22.5% of residents were 65 years of age or older. For every 100 females there were 98.9 males, and for every 100 females age 18 and over there were 97.5 males age 18 and over.

The racial makeup of the county was 93.0% White, 0.2% Black or African American, 0.4% American Indian and Alaska Native, 0.4% Asian, 0.1% Native Hawaiian and Pacific Islander, 0.3% from some other race, and 5.6% from two or more races. Hispanic or Latino residents of any race comprised 1.9% of the population.

0.0% of residents lived in urban areas, while 100.0% lived in rural areas.

There were 2,208 households in the county, of which 28.0% had children under the age of 18 living with them and 24.3% had a female householder with no spouse or partner present. About 31.3% of all households were made up of individuals and 16.3% had someone living alone who was 65 years of age or older.

There were 2,675 housing units, of which 17.5% were vacant. Among occupied housing units, 72.0% were owner-occupied and 28.0% were renter-occupied. The homeowner vacancy rate was 2.0% and the rental vacancy rate was 6.2%.

Carter County, Missouri – Racial and ethnic composition Note: the US Census treats Hispanic/Latino as an ethnic category. This table excludes Latinos from the racial categories and assigns them to a separate category. Hispanics/Latinos may be of any race.
Race / Ethnicity (NH = Non-Hispanic)	Pop 1980	Pop 1990	Pop 2000	Pop 2010	Pop 2020	% 1980	% 1990	% 2000	% 2010	% 2020
White alone (NH)	5,368	5,443	5,685	5,992	4,794	98.89%	98.69%	95.69%	95.64%	92.16%
Black or African American alone (NH)	0	1	3	5	11	0.00%	0.02%	0.05%	0.08%	0.21%
Native American or Alaska Native alone (NH)	20	33	75	65	17	0.37%	0.60%	1.26%	1.04%	0.33%
Asian alone (NH)	1	5	6	9	18	0.02%	0.09%	0.10%	0.14%	0.35%
Native Hawaiian or Pacific Islander alone (NH)	x	x	0	1	1	x	x	0.00%	0.02%	0.02%
Other race alone (NH)	7	0	0	3	3	0.13%	0.00%	0.00%	0.05%	0.06%
Mixed race or Multiracial (NH)	x	x	100	86	261	x	x	1.68%	1.37%	5.02%
Hispanic or Latino (any race)	32	33	72	104	97	0.59%	0.60%	1.21%	1.66%	1.86%
Total	5,428	5,515	5,941	6,265	5,202	100.00%	100.00%	100.00%	100.00%	100.00%

=== 2000 census ===
As of the 2000 census of 2000, there were 5,941 people, 2,378 households, and 1,674 families residing in the county. The population density was 12 people per square mile (4.6 people/km^{2}). There were 3,028 housing units at an average density of 6 units per square mile (2.3/km^{2}). The racial makeup of the county was 96.60% White, 0.08% Black or African American, 1.35% Native American, 0.10% Asian, 0.03% from other races, and 1.83% from two or more races. Approximately 1.21% of the population were Hispanic or Latino of any race. Among the major first ancestries reported in Carter County were 28.1% American, 15.5% Irish, 15.0% German, and 12.7% English.

There were 2,378 households, out of which 30.80% had children under the age of 18 living with them, 57.40% were married couples living together, 8.90% had a female householder with no husband present, and 29.60% were non-families. 26.70% of all households were made up of individuals, and 12.60% had someone living alone who was 65 years of age or older. The average household size was 2.46 and the average family size was 2.97.

In the county, the population was spread out, with 25.10% under the age of 18, 8.00% from 18 to 24, 25.90% from 25 to 44, 25.00% from 45 to 64, and 15.90% who were 65 years of age or older. The median age was 39 years. For every 100 females there were 96.50 males. For every 100 females age 18 and over, there were 94.20 males.

The median income for a household in the county was $27,608, and the median income for a family was $33,349. Males had a median income of $25,568 versus $16,500 for females. The per capita income for the county was $16,178. About 19.60% of families and 25.20% of the population were below the poverty line, including 36.10% of those under age 18 and 20.20% of those age 65 or over.

== Education ==
Of adults 25 years of age and older in Carter County, 66.6% possesses a high school diploma or higher while 10.8% holds a bachelor's degree or higher as their highest educational attainment.

=== Early schools ===
Prior to the creation of Carter County the only schools in the area were private subscription schools. These schools were generally held in a home or an abandoned log cabin. Teachers were paid by charging a monthly tuition, generally a dollar a month, which they were responsible for collecting. The average salary for these teachers was about ten dollars month. The curriculum was very basic as generally the teachers themselves had little in the way of education.

When Carter County was organized the 16th section of each township was set aside for schools, and when sold the interest on the money raised would go toward the maintenance of public schools, also known as Common Schools as they were regarded as being for the “common” people who could not afford to patronize one of the private schools.

At the second meeting of the Carter County court (July 4, 1859) N. H. Tucker was appointed commissioner of the common schools. Tucker issued four teachers certificates that year. William Kirkendall received a certificate to teach a school at Brushy Creek near to where Ellsinore would one day be located. Maercus L. Giles received a certificate to teach a public school which was probably located somewhere on upper Big Brushy Creek. James Ferguson received a certificate to teach a public school that was probably on Cane Creek south of the present location of Ellsinore. And Daniel W. Hoskins received a certificate to teach a public school that was located on Carter Creek east of Van Buren. That year there were a total of 433 students attending school Carter County, with 208 of those students attending the public schools.

As early as 1861 a school was organized in Van Buren but was soon discontinued because of the Civil War. Indeed, the Civil War disrupted schools all across Carter County.

In 1874, a report sent to the State Superintendent of Public Schools stated that of the 581 children of school age in the county, only 99 were attending school. (Another source places the school age population of Carter County in 1874 at only 487). The 1874 report to the State Superintendent went on to say that there were only three school houses in the entire county and 25 teachers. The salaries of a male teacher averaged $16 a month while that of a female teacher averaged $10 a month.

During the same year (1874), the Carter County Superintendent in his report said, "Among other difficulties may be mentioned an indifference to the subject of popular education on the part of many citizens, and a reluctance to be taxed for school purposes. Our schoolhouses are of a very inferior class, supplied with the rudest benches for seats, and destitute of blackboards or apparatus of any kind. Many of the houses in which schools are taught are unoccupied cabins, which have been erected and used for temporary dwellings, until the owner could furnish more comfortable apartments for his family."

In 1884 there were 17 schools with 20 teachers with an average salary of $28.80 a month. There were 855 school age children in the county, but the daily attendance was only 384, less than half of the school age population. The total value of school property was $1,360.00 and the total expenses for the schools that year were $2.566.67.

In 1892 there were 24 public schools in the county. That year there were 1,542 school age children in the county of which 1,386 were enrolled in school. The total expenses for the schools that year were $4,374.55. Three of these 24 schools had globes, two had charts, and six had wall maps.

In 1903 there were 29 public schools and 33 teachers. Of the 2,001 school age children in the county 1,552 were enrolled in a school, and the schools had an average daily attendance of 900. The total expenditures for the schools that year were $13,319.71.

In 1913 there were 36 public schools in Carter County employing 40 teachers at an average salary of $40.00 a month. The number of school age children in the county was 1,754 of which 1,561 were enrolled in a school. The average daily attendance was 737. Although there were more schools and teachers than in 1903, there were fewer students. This was due in large part to the departure of the big sawmills as the timber boom in Carter County came to an end. From about 1900 to 1910 there had been a high school at Grandin, but by 1913 there were no high schools in Carter County. Yet by 1914 there were four high schools in the county.

In 1923 there were 29 public schools in the county employing 59 teachers at an average salary of $79.00 a month. That year there were 1,960 students enrolled in school with an average daily attendance of 1,215. The total expenses for schools that year were $15,729.93.

1923 also saw a total of 6 high schools in the county, the largest number of high schools to ever exist in Carter County at one time. The high school at Midco was the first to close, consolidating with the Fremont School. In 1957 the Fremont school was destroyed by a tornado, and although rebuilt the school eventually consolidated with Van Buren. The high school at Hunter was consolidated with the school at Grandin, which in turn was consolidated with the Ellsinore School in the early 1960s, bringing the total of high schools in the county to two, which is the present total.

Today there are two public school districts in Carter County, Van Buren R-1 School district, and the East Carter County R-11 School district at Ellsinore.

=== Public schools ===
- East Carter County R-II School District - Ellsinore
  - East Carter County Elementary School (PK-05)
  - East Carter County Middle School (06–08)
  - East Carter County High School (09–12)
- Van Buren R-I School District - Van Buren
  - Van Buren Elementary School (PK-05)
  - Van Buren High School (06–12)

=== Public libraries ===
- Ellsinore Branch Library
- Grandin Branch Library
- Van Buren Main Branch Library

== Politics ==
=== Local ===
Politics are divided at the local level in Carter County. Republicans hold a majority of the elected positions in the county.

Carter County, Missouri

Elected countywide officials
Assessor	Gary Rector	Republican
Circuit Clerk	Mary Godsy	Republican
County Clerk	Leona Stephens	Republican
Collector	Lisa Goodwin	Democratic
Commissioner (presiding)	Ronald Keeney	Republican
Commissioner (district 1)	Tom Wilder	Republican
Commissioner (district 2)	Lynn Murdick	Republican
Coroner	Joe Ben Chapman	Republican
Prosecuting Attorney	Hannah Pender	Democratic
Public Administrator	Heidi Truncone	Republican
Recorder	Pauline Peterman	Democratic
Sheriff	Dustin Boyer	Republican
Treasurer	Velvet Ricker	Republican

=== State ===
Past Gubernatorial Elections Results
Year	Republican	Democratic	Third Parties
2024	87.54% 2,467	11.43% 322	1.03% 29
2020	84.31% 2,412	14.02% 401	1.68% 48
2016	73.07% 2,051	23.19% 651	3.74% 105
2012	51.49% 1,414	44.97% 1,235	3.53% 97
2008	43.30% 1,232	53.29% 1,516	3.41% 97
2004	59.82% 1,563	39.11% 1,022	1.07% 28
2000	52.69% 1,441	42.16% 1,153	5.15% 141
1996	42.35% 1,112	56.09% 1,473	1.56% 41
1992	43.76% 1,144	56.24% 1,470	0.00% 0
1988	63.70% 1,590	35.90% 896	0.40% 10
1984	61.31% 1,388	38.69% 876	0.00% 0
1980	53.12% 1,250	46.66% 1,098	0.21% 5
1976	50.08% 985	49.82% 980	0.10% 2
1972	51.42% 942	48.58% 890	0.00% 0
1968	41.07% 750	58.93% 1,076	0.00% 0
1964	36.31% 728	63.69% 1,277	0.00% 0
1960	47.00% 799	53.00% 901	0.00% 0

In the Missouri House of Representatives, all of Carter County is a part of Missouri's 153rd District and is currently represented by Darrell Atchison, (R-Williamsville).

Missouri House of Representatives — District 153 — Carter County (2020)
Party	Candidate	Votes	%	±%
Republican	Darrell Atchison	2,501	100.00%	+29.33

Missouri House of Representatives — District 153 — Carter County (2018)
Party	Candidate	Votes	%	±%
Republican	Jeff Shawan	1,617	70.67%	−0.84
Democratic	Matt Michel	671	29.33%	+0.84

In the Missouri Senate, all of Carter County is a part of Missouri's 25th District and is currently represented by Jason Bean (R-Holcomb).

Missouri Senate — District 25 — Carter County (2020)
Party	Candidate	Votes	%	±%
Republican	Jason Bean	2,528	100.00%	+25.55

Missouri Senate — District 25 — Carter County (2018)
Party	Candidate	Votes	%	±%
Republican	Doug Libla	2,016	74.45%	+15.68
Democratic	Bill Burlison	692	25.55%	−15.68

=== Federal ===
All of Carter County is included in Missouri's 8th Congressional District and is currently represented by Jason Smith (R-Salem) in the U.S. House of Representatives. Smith was elected to a fifth term in 2020 over Democratic challenger Kathy Ellis.

U.S. House of Representatives – Missouri’s 8th Congressional District – Carter County (2020)
Party	Candidate	Votes	%	±%
Republican	Jason Smith	2,378	84.78%	
Democratic	Kathy Ellis	392	13.98%	
Libertarian	Tom Schmitz	35	1.25%	

U.S. House of Representatives – Missouri's 8th Congressional District – Carter County (2018)
Party	Candidate	Votes	%	±%
Republican	Jason Smith	1,870	81.30%	+1.54
Democratic	Kathy Ellis	401	17.44%	+0.04
Libertarian	Jonathan L. Shell	29	1.26%	−1.59

Carter County, along with the rest of the state of Missouri, is represented in the U.S. Senate by Josh Hawley (R-Columbia) and Roy Blunt (R-Strafford).

U.S. Senate – Class I – Carter County (2018)
Party	Candidate	Votes	%	±%
Republican	Josh Hawley	1,799	76.49%	+25.97
Democratic	Claire McCaskill	489	20.79%	−22.91
Independent	Craig O'Dear	32	1.36%	
Libertarian	Japheth Campbell	17	0.72%	−5.05
Green	Jo Crain	15	0.64%	+0.64

Blunt was elected to a second term in 2016 over then-Missouri Secretary of State Jason Kander.

U.S. Senate — Class III — Carter County (2016)
Party	Candidate	Votes	%	±%
Republican	Roy Blunt	1,908	68.51%	+17.99
Democratic	Jason Kander	742	26.64%	−17.06
Libertarian	Jonathan Dine	71	2.55%	−3.22
Green	Johnathan McFarland	33	1.18%	+1.18
Constitution	Fred Ryman	30	1.08%	+1.08
Write-In	Patrick Lee	1	0.04%	+0.04

==== Political culture ====
United States presidential election results for Carter County, Missouri
Year	Republican		Democratic		Third party(ies)	
Year	No.	%	No.	%	No.	%
1888	292	39.04%	455	60.83%	1	0.13%
1892	377	37.29%	617	61.03%	17	1.68%
1896	483	43.63%	611	55.19%	13	1.17%
1900	629	45.25%	755	54.32%	6	0.43%
1904	510	46.11%	556	50.27%	40	3.62%
1908	507	43.63%	591	50.86%	64	5.51%
1912	256	27.65%	458	49.46%	212	22.89%
1916	469	41.50%	586	51.86%	75	6.64%
1920	1,057	51.64%	930	45.43%	60	2.93%
1924	772	40.57%	1,051	55.23%	80	4.20%
1928	989	50.41%	963	49.08%	10	0.51%
1932	750	32.48%	1,522	65.92%	37	1.60%
1936	1,073	39.90%	1,590	59.13%	26	0.97%
1940	1,195	44.31%	1,499	55.58%	3	0.11%
1944	1,033	45.87%	1,207	53.60%	12	0.53%
1948	964	43.09%	1,255	56.10%	18	0.80%
1952	1,100	49.48%	1,123	50.52%	0	0.00%
1956	1,033	49.19%	1,067	50.81%	0	0.00%
1960	1,049	60.57%	683	39.43%	0	0.00%
1964	761	38.18%	1,232	61.82%	0	0.00%
1968	861	45.60%	738	39.09%	289	15.31%
1972	1,257	68.99%	565	31.01%	0	0.00%
1976	842	41.95%	1,154	57.50%	11	0.55%
1980	1,218	51.44%	1,087	45.90%	63	2.66%
1984	1,402	60.48%	916	39.52%	0	0.00%
1988	1,429	56.53%	1,087	43.00%	12	0.47%
1992	1,101	40.99%	1,169	43.52%	416	15.49%
1996	1,180	44.08%	1,172	43.78%	325	12.14%
2000	1,730	61.61%	997	35.51%	81	2.88%
2004	1,797	64.66%	964	34.69%	18	0.65%
2008	1,840	63.49%	984	33.95%	74	2.55%
2012	1,978	70.67%	754	26.94%	67	2.39%
2016	2,324	81.54%	436	15.30%	90	3.16%
2020	2,451	84.60%	418	14.43%	28	0.97%
2024	2,488	86.93%	364	12.72%	10	0.35%

At the presidential level, Carter County has become solidly Republican in recent years. Carter County strongly favored Donald Trump in both 2016 and 2020. Bill Clinton was the last Democratic presidential nominee to carry Carter County in 1992 with a plurality of the vote, and a Democrat hasn't won majority support from the county's voters in a presidential election since Jimmy Carter in 1976.

Like most rural areas throughout Missouri, voters in Carter County generally adhere to socially and culturally conservative principles which tend to influence their Republican leanings. In 2004, Missourians voted on a constitutional amendment to define marriage as the union between a man and a woman—it overwhelmingly passed Carter County with 86.59 percent of the vote. The initiative passed the state with 71 percent of support from voters as Missouri became the first state to ban same-sex marriage. In 2006, Missourians voted on a constitutional amendment to fund and legalize embryonic stem cell research in the state—it failed in Carter County with 56.45 percent voting against the measure. The initiative narrowly passed the state with 51 percent of support from voters as Missouri became one of the first states in the nation to approve embryonic stem cell research. Despite Carter County's longstanding tradition of supporting socially conservative platforms, voters in the county have a penchant for advancing populist causes like increasing the minimum wage. In 2006, Missourians voted on a proposition (Proposition B) to increase the minimum wage in the state to $6.50 an hour—it passed Carter County with 73.01 percent of the vote. The proposition strongly passed every single county in Missouri with 75.94 percent voting in favor as the minimum wage was increased to $6.50 an hour in the state. (During the same election, voters in five other states also strongly approved increases in the minimum wage.) In 2018, Missourians voted on a proposition (Proposition A) concerning right to work, the outcome of which ultimately reversed the right to work legislation passed in the state the previous year. 65.82% of Carter County voters cast their ballots to overturn the law.

=== Missouri presidential preference primaries ===
==== 2020 ====
The 2020 presidential primaries for both the Democratic and Republican parties were held in Missouri on March 10. On the Democratic side, former Vice President Joe Biden (D-Delaware) both won statewide and carried Carter County by a wide margin. Biden went on to defeat President Donald Trump in the general election.

Missouri Democratic Presidential Primary – Carter County (2020)
Party	Candidate	Votes	%	±%
Democratic	Joe Biden	139	55.82	
Democratic	Bernie Sanders	92	36.95	
Democratic	Tulsi Gabbard	3	1.21	
Democratic	Others/Uncommitted	15	6.02	

Incumbent President Donald Trump (R-Florida) faced a primary challenge from former Massachusetts Governor Bill Weld, but won statewide by an overwhelming margin. Weld only received a single vote (or 0.17%) in Carter County.

==== 2016 ====
The 2016 presidential primaries for both the Republican and Democratic parties were held in Missouri on March 15. Businessman Donald Trump (R-New York) narrowly won the state overall, but carried a majority of the vote in Carter County. He went on to win the presidency.

Missouri Republican Presidential Primary – Carter County (2016)
Party	Candidate	Votes	%	±%
Republican	Donald Trump	623	53.52	
Republican	Ted Cruz	404	34.71	
Republican	John Kasich	59	5.07	
Republican	Marco Rubio	50	4.30	
Republican	Others/Uncommitted	28	2.41	

On the Democratic side, former Secretary of State Hillary Clinton (D-New York) narrowly won statewide, but Senator Bernie Sanders (I-Vermont) carried Carter County by a small margin.

Missouri Democratic Presidential Primary – Carter County (2016)
Party	Candidate	Votes	%	±%
Democratic	Bernie Sanders	142	50.00	
Democratic	Hillary Clinton	138	48.59	
Democratic	Others/Uncommitted	4	1.41	

==== 2012 ====
The 2012 Missouri Republican Presidential Primary's results were nonbinding on the state's national convention delegates. Voters in Carter County supported former U.S. Senator Rick Santorum (R-Pennsylvania), who finished first in the state at large, but eventually lost the nomination to former Governor Mitt Romney (R-Massachusetts). Delegates to the congressional district and state conventions were chosen at a county caucus, which selected a delegation favoring Santorum. Incumbent President Barack Obama easily won the Missouri Democratic Primary and renomination. He defeated Romney in the general election.

==== 2008 ====
In 2008, the Missouri Republican Presidential Primary was closely contested, with Senator John McCain (R-Arizona) prevailing and eventually winning the nomination. However, former Governor Mike Huckabee (R-Arkansas) won a majority of the vote in Carter County.

Missouri Republican Presidential Primary – Carter County (2008)
Party	Candidate	Votes	%	±%
Republican	Mike Huckabee	373	52.39	
Republican	John McCain	202	28.37	
Republican	Mitt Romney	107	15.03	
Republican	Ron Paul	24	3.37	
Republican	Others/Uncommitted	6	0.84	

Then-Senator Hillary Clinton (D-New York) received more votes than any candidate from either party in Carter County during the 2008 presidential primary. Despite initial reports that Clinton had won Missouri, Barack Obama (D-Illinois), also a Senator at the time, narrowly defeated her statewide and later became that year's Democratic nominee, going on to win the presidency.

Missouri Democratic Presidential Primary – Carter County (2008)
Party	Candidate	Votes	%	±%
Democratic	Hillary Clinton	541	75.24	
Democratic	Barack Obama	137	19.05	
Democratic	Others/Uncommitted	41	5.71	

== Tourism ==
A variety of recreational activities, including Current River Cavern, Ozark National Scenic Riverways, Peck Ranch Wildlife Refuge, Watercress Park, Big Spring National Park, and the Current River (Missouri) are also available in Carter County. Also, see the Ozarks.

== Communities ==
=== Cities ===
- Ellsinore
- Grandin
- Van Buren (seat)

=== Census-designated places ===
- Fremont
- Hunter

=== Unincorporated communities ===
- Chicopee
- Chilton
- Crites Corner
- Eastwood
- House Creek
- Midco

== Notable people ==
- A.S.J. Carnahan, U.S. Representative from Missouri (1945–1947, 1949–1961) and Ambassador to Sierra Leone (1961–1963)
- Mel Carnahan, Governor of Missouri (1993–2000)

== See also ==
- National Register of Historic Places listings in Carter County, Missouri
