= Van Buren, Missouri =

City in Missouri, U.S.

- City
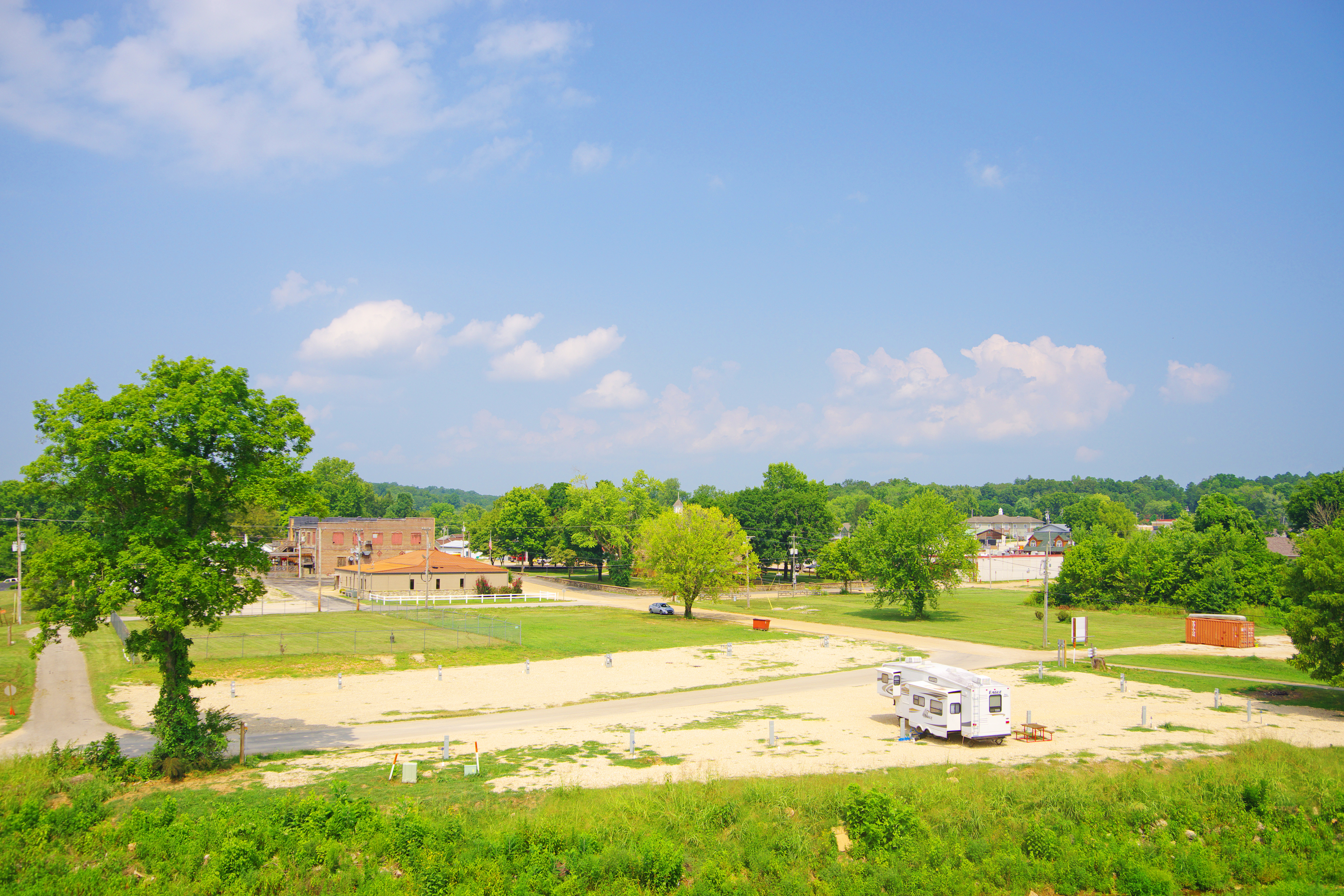
- View across campground from US 60; courthouse square in the distance

- Location of Van Buren, Missouri
- Coordinates: 37°0′13″N 91°0′55″W
- Country: United States
- State: Missouri
- County: Carter
- Township: Carter

Area
  - Total: 2.00 sq mi (5.18 km^{2})
  - Land: 2.00 sq mi (5.18 km^{2})
  - Water: 0.0039 sq mi (0.01 km^{2})
- Elevation: 472 ft (144 m)

Population (2020)
  - Total: 747
  - Density: 373.7/sq mi (144.28/km^{2})
- Time zone: UTC-6 (Central (CST))
  - Summer (DST): UTC-5 (CDT)
- ZIP code: 63965
- Area code: 573
- FIPS code: 29-75580
- GNIS feature ID: 0752687
- Website: www.cityofvanburenmo.gov

Van Buren is a city in and county seat of Carter County, Missouri, United States, that is the largest city in Carter County. Van Buren was founded in 1833 as the county seat of Ripley County and was named after then Vice President of the United States, Martin Van Buren. In 1859, Van Buren became a part of the newly created Carter County and was subsequently selected to be the county seat. The 2020 U.S. census showed Van Buren with a population of 747.

== History ==
In 1833, a commission appointed to choose a site for the county seat of Ripley County selected a site one-half mile (0.8 km) west and across Current River from the present location of Van Buren. They named the new county seat Van Buren after the then Vice President of the United States, Martin Van Buren. A courthouse was built and a small city grew up around it. The city had one small general merchandise store run by a man named Shaw and a water powered grist mill owned by John George.

Van Buren remained the county seat of Ripley County until 1847, when the county seat was moved south to the town of Doniphan. After removing the county seat to Doniphan, the town declined until only three or four families remained.

On March 10, 1859, Van Buren became part of the newly created Carter County, and on April 4 of that year, Van Buren was selected to be the county seat of Carter County.

In 1867 the present site of Van Buren, located about one-half mile (0.8 km) east and across the river from the original site, was purchased from Zimri A. Carter. Fifty acres (20 ha) of land were purchased from Zimri A. Carter for $475 and the deed was given to Carter County commissioner James Snider. Even before the new city site was fully laid out, the first building to be built was a log courthouse located somewhat west of the current courthouse.

In 1874, the Vidette, a newspaper published by Dr. McDonald, began a brief run of only a few months before it folded. In 1876, another newspaper, the Times, published by Tom Brown and James Moseley, was published until 1884, at which time it was merged with the Current Local, which was established by Clay Moseley that same year, and which is now Carter County's only locally published newspaper.

In 1893–94, the first bridge to cross the Current River was built at Van Buren at a total cost of $4,500. It was a suspension bridge and a toll of 5 cents per person and 15 cents for a team and wagon was charged for crossing it.

In 1901 the Carter County Bank, later known as the Carter County State Bank, was instituted in Van Buren.

In 1907, the company of Pitman and Henry began a motorboat passenger service up and down the Current River between Van Buren and Doniphan.

Sometime after 1907 the lines of the Willow Springs Local Long Distance Phone Company reached Van Buren bringing phone service to Van Buren.

In 1909, a structural steel bridge was built across the Current River at a total cost of approximately $9,000. This bridge was destroyed by a flood in 1915. The bridge was rebuilt at a cost of $15,000 and served the community until 1926, when a new $200,000 bridge was completed. Route 16, later to become U.S. Highway 60, crossed this bridge.

In 1927, electricity first came to Van Buren. The electricity was produced by a generator plant at Van Buren until 1934, at which time electricity generated by plants at Joplin and Lebanon was brought into the city.

== Geography ==
Van Buren is located in northern Carter County at the intersection of US Route 60 and Missouri Route 103. It is on the Current River and adjacent to the Mark Twain National Forest.

According to the United States Census Bureau, the city has a total area of 2.00 square miles (5.18 km^{2}), all land.

== Demographics ==
Historical population
Census	Pop.	Note	%±
1930	345		—
1940	458		32.8%
1950	708		54.6%
1960	575		−18.8%
1970	714		24.2%
1980	850		19.0%
1990	893		5.1%
2000	845		−5.4%
2010	819		−3.1%
2020	747		−8.8%
U.S. Decennial Census

=== 2010 census ===
As of the census of 2010, there were 819 people, 362 households, and 197 families living in the city. The population density was 409.5 inhabitants per square mile (158.1/km^{2}). There were 431 housing units at an average density of 215.5 per square mile (83.2/km^{2}). The racial makeup of the city was 96.0% White, 0.9% Native American, 1.1% from other races, and 2.1% from two or more races. Hispanic or Latino of any race were 2.9% of the population.

There were 362 households, of which 29.0% had children under the age of 18 living with them, 37.3% were married couples living together, 10.5% had a female householder with no husband present, 6.6% had a male householder with no wife present, and 45.6% were non-families. 41.7% of all households were made up of individuals, and 24.9% had someone living alone who was 65 years of age or older. The average household size was 2.18 and the average family size was 2.95.

The median age in the city was 43.4 years. 24.1% of residents were under the age of 18; 7.1% were between the ages of 18 and 24; 20.2% were from 25 to 44; 23.8% were from 45 to 64; and 24.7% were 65 years of age or older. The gender makeup of the city was 44.3% male and 55.7% female.

The median household income in town as of 2012 estimates was $25,958. The median family income in town was $43,333. Married couples median income was $42,250. Nonfamily median household income was $18,555.

=== 2000 census ===
As of the census of 2000, there were 845 people, 390 households, and 223 families living in the town. The population density was 422.6 inhabitants per square mile (163.2/km^{2}). There were 440 housing units at an average density of 220.0 per square mile (84.9/km^{2}). The racial makeup of the town was 96.69% White, 0.36% African American, 0.83% Native American, and 2.13% from two or more races. Hispanic or Latino of any race were 1.30% of the population.

There were 390 households, out of which 25.9% had children under the age of 18 living with them, 43.1% were married couples living together, 11.0% had a female householder with no husband present, and 42.8% were non-families. 40.5% of all households were made up of individuals, and 23.6% had someone living alone who was 65 years of age or older. The average household size was 2.07 and the average family size was 2.76.

In the town the population was spread out, with 20.5% under the age of 18, 8.0% from 18 to 24, 22.2% from 25 to 44, 22.6% from 45 to 64, and 26.6% who were 65 years of age or older. The median age was 44 years. For every 100 females, there were 80.6 males. For every 100 females age 18 and over, there were 76.8 males.

The median income for a household in the town was $19,766, and the median income for a family was $31,154. Males had a median income of $29,250 versus $17,981 for females. The per capita income for the town was $13,061. About 17.7% of families and 25.0% of the population were below the poverty line, including 31.3% of those under age 18 and 25.1% of those age 65 or over.

== Education ==
Van Buren R-I School District operates one elementary school, one middle school, and Van Buren High School.

Van Buren has a lending library, a branch of the Carter County Library.

== Notable people ==
- Lance Shockley, (alleged)convicted murderer in the 2005 murder of Sergeant Carl Graham Jr., born and raised in Van Buren

== See also ==
- List of cities in Missouri
