= National Register of Historic Places listings in Shannon County, Missouri =

Location of Shannon County in Missouri

This is a list of the National Register of Historic Places listings in Shannon County, Missouri.

This is intended to be a complete list of the properties and districts on the National Register of Historic Places in Shannon County, Missouri, United States. Latitude and longitude coordinates are provided for many National Register properties and districts; these locations may be seen together on a map.

There are 17 properties and districts listed on the National Register in the county.

This National Park Service list is complete through NPS recent listings posted May 22, 2026.

== Current listings ==
	Name on the Register	Image	Date listed	Location	City or town	Description
1	Akers Ferry Archeological District	Akers Ferry Archeological District	October 25, 1990 (#90001541)	Address restricted	Rector	
2	Alley Spring Roller Mill	Alley Spring Roller Mill	December 8, 1981 (#81000336)	W of Eminence off MO 106; 37°09′15″N 91°26′31″W	Eminence	
3	Alley Spring State Park Historic District	Alley Spring State Park Historic District	August 2, 2023 (#100005717)	MO 106 at the Jacks Fork R. 37°09′15″N 91°26′31″W	Eminence vicinity	Now part of the Ozark National Scenic Riverways.
4	Alton Club	Alton Club	October 14, 2005 (#05001162)	Gravel road, 1.5 mi. W of MO 19 and 12 Mi. N of Eminence; 37°19′26″N 91°26′10″W	Eminence	
5	Buttin Rock School		May 31, 1991 (#91000605)	E bank of Current R., S of Powder Mill Ferry, Ozark National Scenic Riverways; 37°08′42″N 91°10′12″W	Eminence	
6	Chilton-Williams Farm Complex	Chilton-Williams Farm Complex	September 2, 1981 (#81000696)	E of Eminence off MO 106; 37°11′02″N 91°11′25″W	Eminence	
7	Culpepper-Pummil Site (23SH14/55)		February 3, 1988 (#87002500)	Address restricted	Alley Spring	
8	Walter Klepzig Mill and Farm	Walter Klepzig Mill and Farm	February 13, 1990 (#90000001)	Along Rocky Creek in Ozark National Scenic Riverway; 37°07′30″N 91°11′58″W	Eminence	
9	Old Eminence Site (23SH104)		February 9, 1988 (#87002534)	Address restricted	Round Spring	
10	Owl's Bend Site (23SH10)		May 12, 1988 (#87002530)	Address restricted	Eminence	
11	Pulltite Site (23SH94)	Pulltite Site (23SH94)	February 4, 1988 (#87002532)	Address restricted	Eminence	
12	Reed Log House	Reed Log House	April 29, 1991 (#91000456)	Along Current R. S of Powder Mill Ferry, Ozark National Scenic Riverways; 37°09′10″N 91°10′07″W	Eminence	
13	Rhinehart Ranch		November 14, 1980 (#80002395)	NW of Eminence; 37°15′03″N 91°26′46″W	Eminence	
14	Round Spring Archeological District		January 25, 1993 (#92001749)	Vicinity of the spring at Round Spring; 37°16′57″N 91°24′28″W	Eminence	
15	Shawnee Creek Site		April 27, 1990 (#90000604)	Address restricted	Eminence	
16	Two Rivers Site		January 23, 1993 (#92001750)	Address restricted	Eminence	
17	Winona Ranger Station Historic District		August 4, 2003 (#03000715)	Rte 1, MO 19N; 37°00′49″N 91°19′16″W	Winona	

== See also ==
- List of National Historic Landmarks in Missouri
- National Register of Historic Places listings in Missouri
