= Current River =

Current River may refer to:

Canada

- Current River (Ontario), a tributary of Lake Superior in Thunder Bay
- Current River, Thunder Bay, Ontario, a neighborhood

United States

- Current River (Ozarks), a tributary of the Black River in Missouri
- Current River State Park, Shannon County, Missouri
- Current River Township, Ripley County, Missouri
