= Howell Hollow =

Valley in the American state of Missouri

Howell Hollow is a valley in northwest Shannon County in the U.S. state of Missouri. The northeast flowing intermittent stream in the valley is a tributary to the Current River about one mile northwest of Akers. The source area is at 37°22′35″N 91°36′38″W and the confluence is at 37°22′30″N 91°35′17″W with an elevation of 863 feet (263 m).

Howell Hollow has the name of the local Howell family.
