= Owls Bend, Missouri =

Unincorporated community in Missouri, U.S.

Coordinates: 37°11′04″N 91°11′14″W

Owls Bend is an unincorporated community in eastern Shannon County, in the Ozarks of southern Missouri, United States. The community is located adjacent to the Current River, northeast of the Missouri Route 106 crossing and the Powder Mill Creek campground.

== History ==
A post office called Owls Bend was established in 1923, and remained in operation until 1955. The community was so named on account of the abundance of owls at a nearby meander on the Current River.

The community includes Owl's Bend Site, a Native American archaeological site placed on the National Register of Historic Places in 1988.
