= Owl's Bend Site =

- Owl's Bend Site (23SH10)
- U.S. National Register of Historic Places
- Nearest city: Eminence, Missouri
- NRHP reference No.: 87002530
- Added to NRHP: May 12, 1988

The Owl's Bend Site is a location in the Ozark National Scenic Riverways. It is situated at Owls Bend, Missouri, in eastern Shannon County adjacent to the Current River. It was placed on the National Register of Historic Places on March 22, 1988.
