= Current River State Park =

State park in Missouri, United States

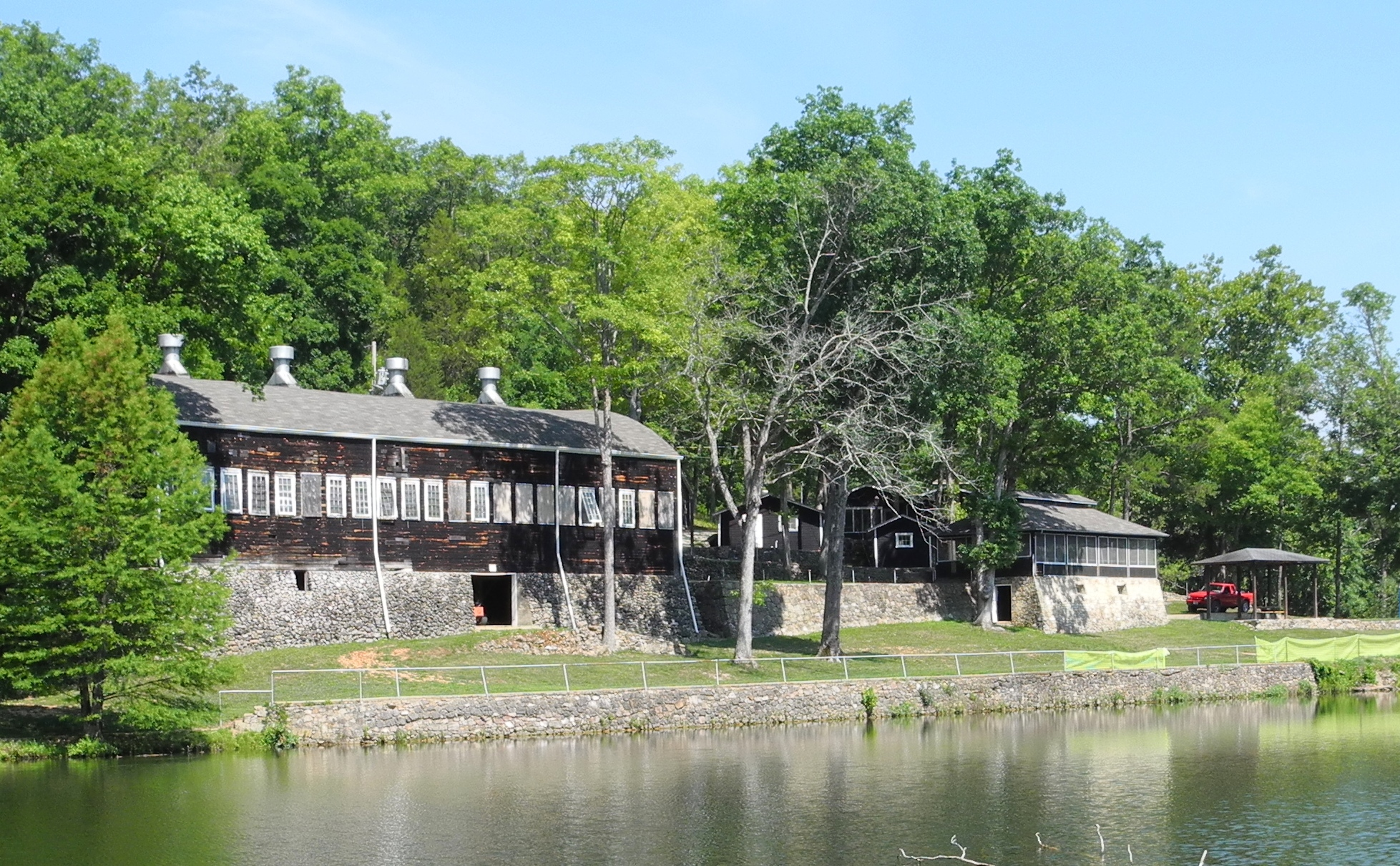
- Historic buildings of the Alton Club

- Location within Missouri Location within the United States
- Interactive map of Current River State Park
- Location: Newton Township, Shannon County, Missouri, United States
- Coordinates: 37°19′18″N 91°26′12″W
- Area: 839 acres (340 ha)
- Established: 2007
- Administrator: Missouri Department of Natural Resources
- Visitors: 4,138 (in 2022)
- Website: Official website

Current River State Park is a public recreation area occupying 839 acres (340 ha) along the Current River north of Eminence in Newton Township, Shannon County, Missouri. The state park consists of land and buildings originally developed as the Alton Club, a corporate retreat used in the 1930s and 1940s by the Alton Box Board Company of Alton, Illinois. Rustic buildings associated with the Alton Club were added to the National Register of Historic Places in 2005.

== Activities and amenities ==
The park offers fishing and boating on two small lakes, picnicking facilities, nine miles (14 km) of hiking trails, and tours of the historic buildings. It is open on weekends during warm weather months.
