= Akers, Missouri =

Akers
- Unincorporated community
- Location within the state of Missouri
- Coordinates: 37°22′34″N 91°33′14″W
- Country: United States
- State: Missouri
- County: Shannon
- Township: Jackson
- Elevation: 824 ft (251 m)
- Time zone: UTC-6 (Central (CST))
  - Summer (DST): UTC-5 (CDT)
- GNIS feature ID: 740619

Akers is an unincorporated community in northwestern Shannon County, Missouri, United States. It is located approximately eighteen miles northwest of Eminence in the Ozark National Scenic Riverways. Akers houses a campground and access to the Current River. Since there is no bridge within the community, there was historically a small ferry that allowed vehicles traveling on Highway K to cross the Current River. It has been out of service since 2021.

== History ==
A post office called Akers was established in 1884, and remained in operation until 1965. John Akers, an early postmaster, gave the community his last name.

In 1925, Akers had 55 inhabitants.

On August 8th, 1988, a Federal Express DC-10 collided with a F-4 in a forested area near Akers, mainly due to the DC-10's squawk code malfunctioning and setting the code to 7500, which caused 2 F-4s to intercept.
