= Alley Spring, Missouri =

Alley Spring
- Unincorporated community
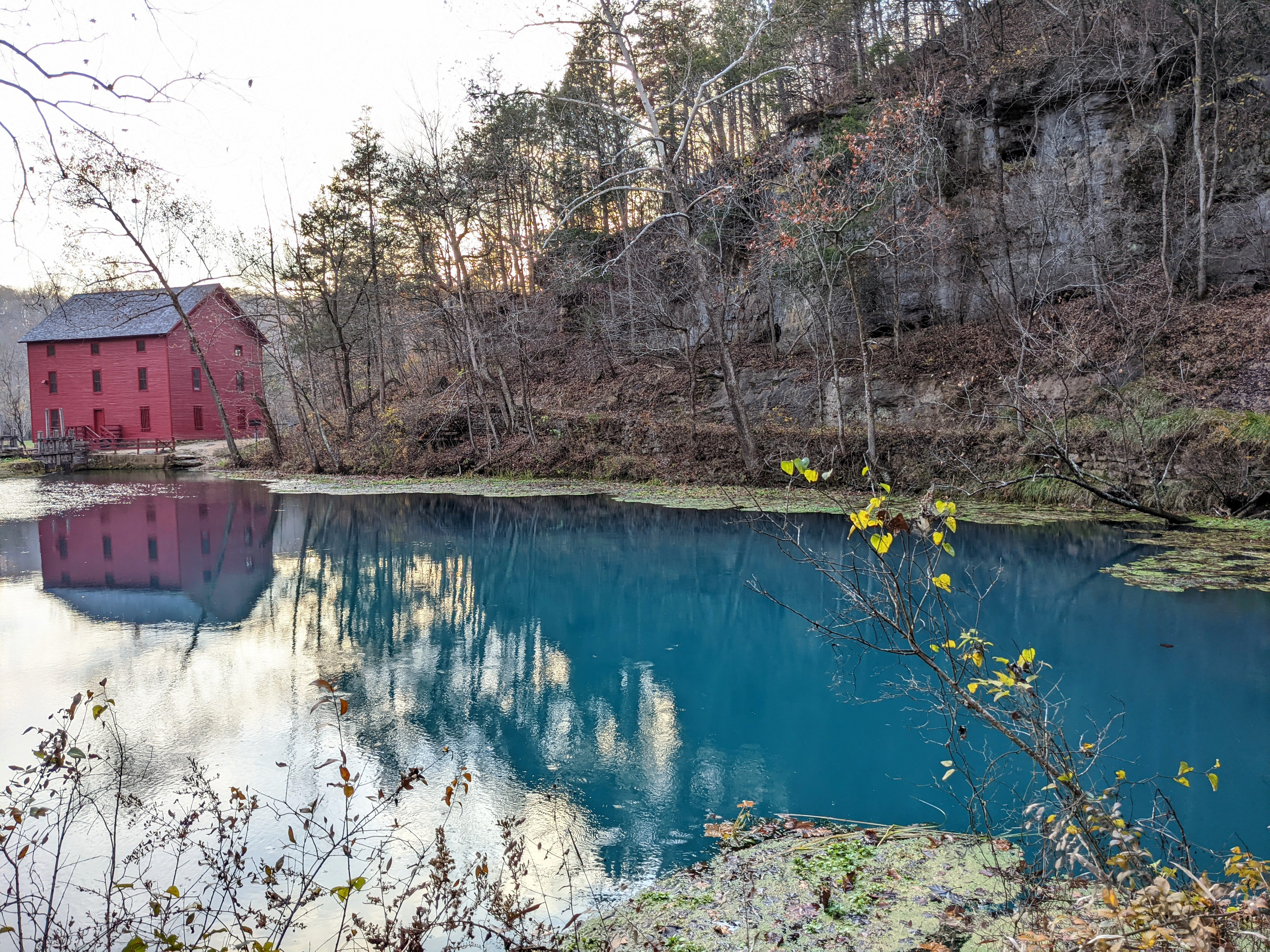
- Alley Spring, Mill, and bluff in autumn

- Location within the state of Missouri
- Coordinates: 37°8′39″N 91°26′38″W
- Country: United States
- State: Missouri
- County: Shannon
- Township: Eminence
- Elevation: 679 ft (207 m)
- Time zone: UTC-6 (Central (CST))
  - Summer (DST): UTC-5 (CDT)
- GNIS feature ID: 713232

Alley Spring is an unincorporated community in Shannon County, Missouri, United States. It is located six miles west of Eminence on Route 106. The scenic Alley Mill, or "Old Red Mill" is located there on a spring and is located in the Ozark National Scenic Riverways. The Mill is operated as an Ozarks history museum. Nearby, a one room schoolhouse and general store add to the feeling of the restored historic hamlet. It once had a post office, but it is now closed, and mail now comes from Eminence. The community is named after John Alley, a miller. It was originally named Mammoth Spring and later Barksdale Spring. These names were deemed too long by the Post Office Department of the time, so the village was renamed after a prominent local citizen, John Alley.

== History ==
A post office called Alley was established in 1884, the name was changed to Alley Spring in 1950, and the post office closed in 1974. The community has the name of John Alley, original owner of the town site.

== Geography ==
The National Park Service operates a large campground at Alley. There is a small convenience store and canoe rental as well. Canoeing is very popular on the Jacks Fork River which runs through Alley.

== Arts and culture ==
The Haunting in the Hills is an annual event held at Alley Spring. It consists of traditional Ozark demonstrations and a storytelling event, Tales from Ozark's Dark Side. The annual event takes place the second weekend of October. All Events are free to the public.

== Gallery ==
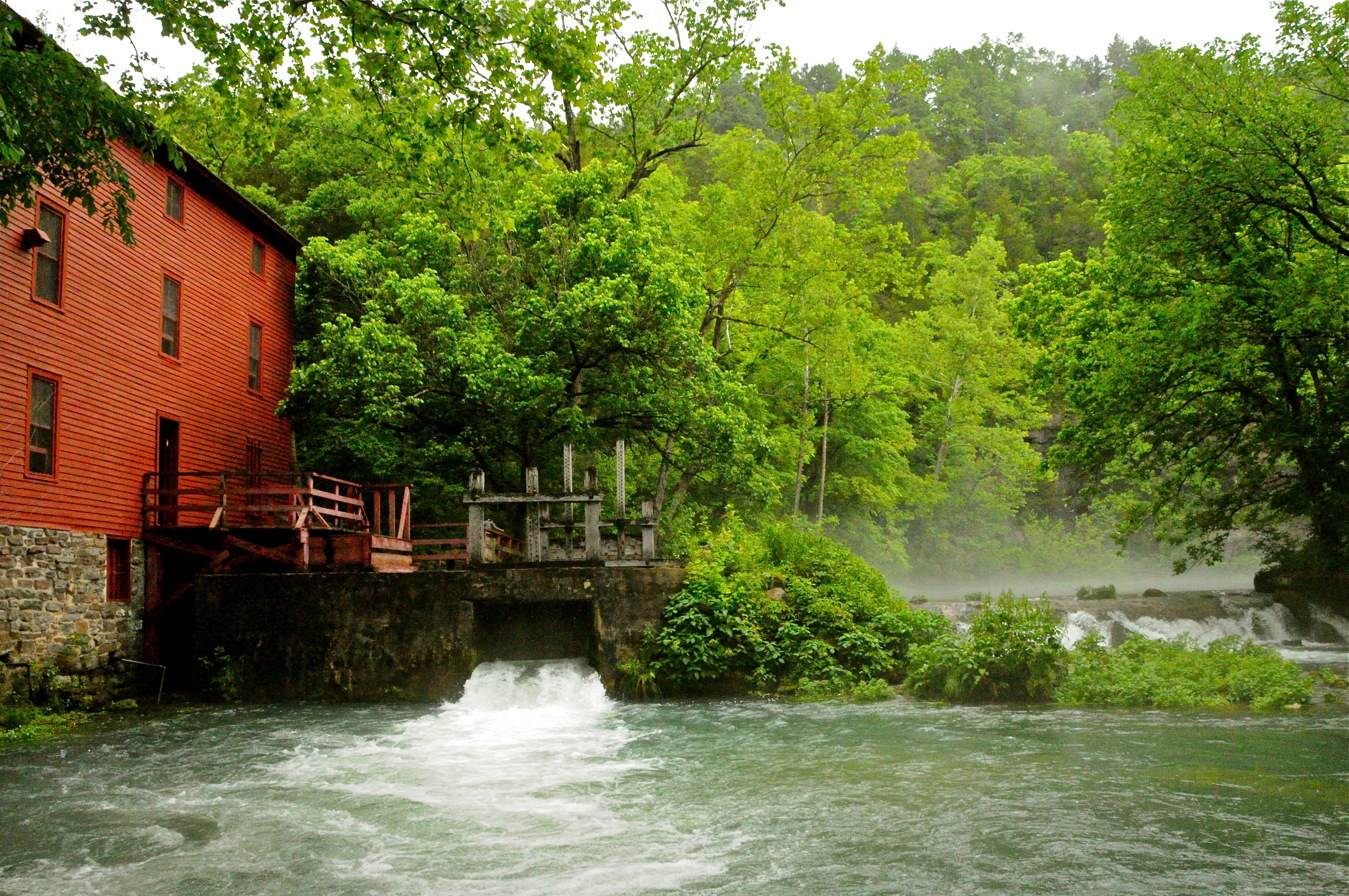
The mill at Alley Spring is now part of the Ozark National Scenic Riverways park.

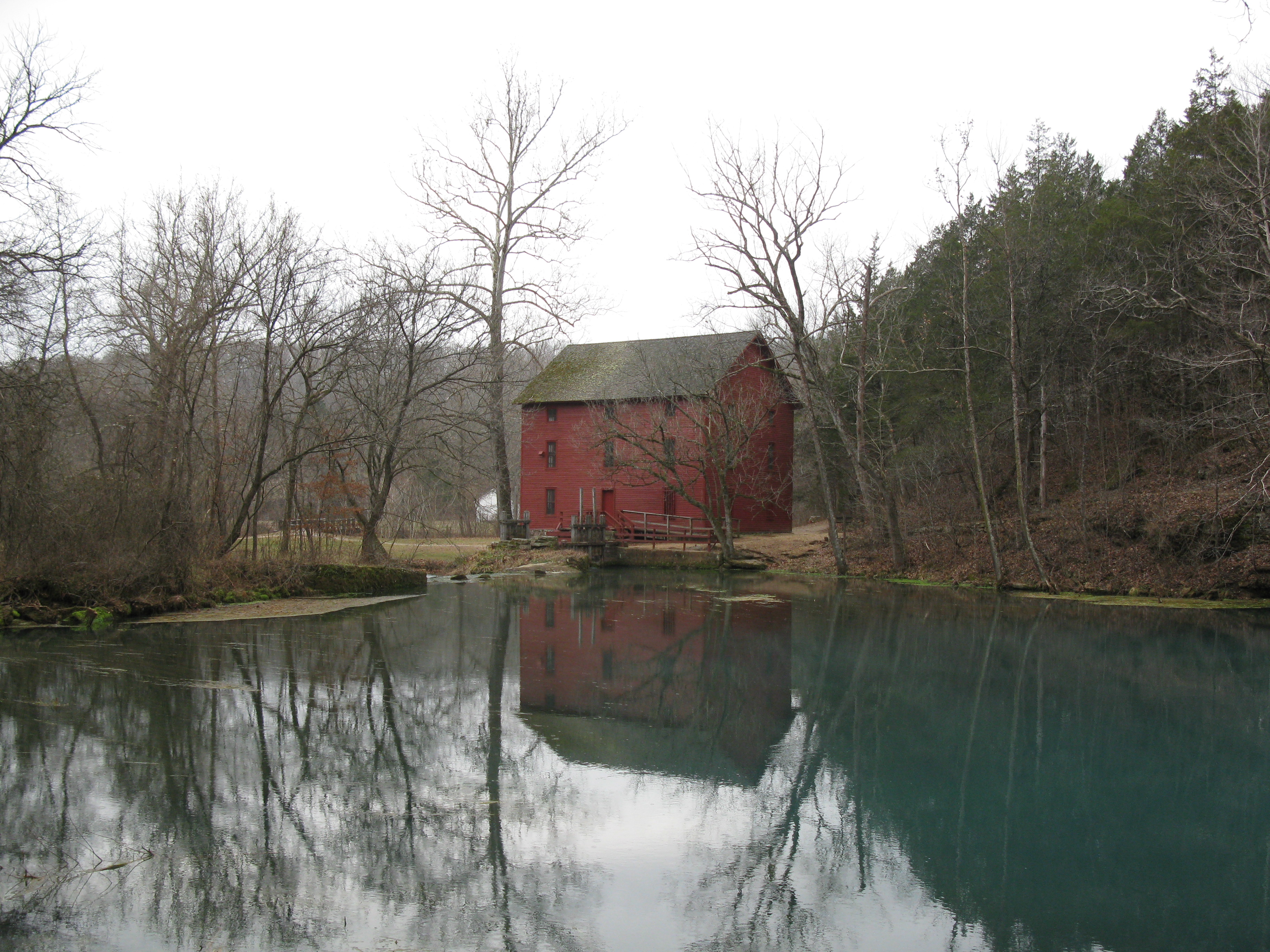
The mill from the spring

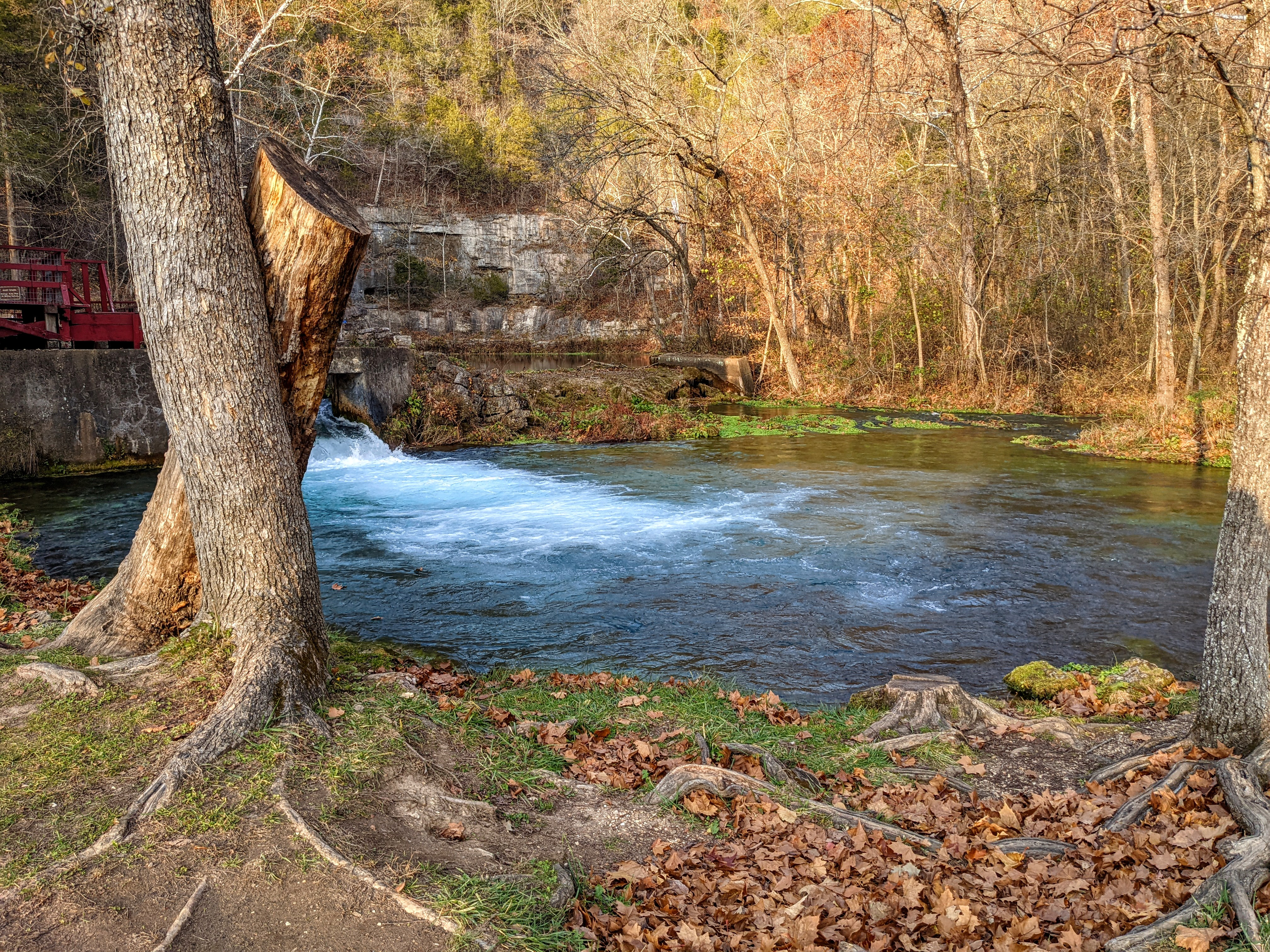
Alley Spring in the autumn, facing the mill

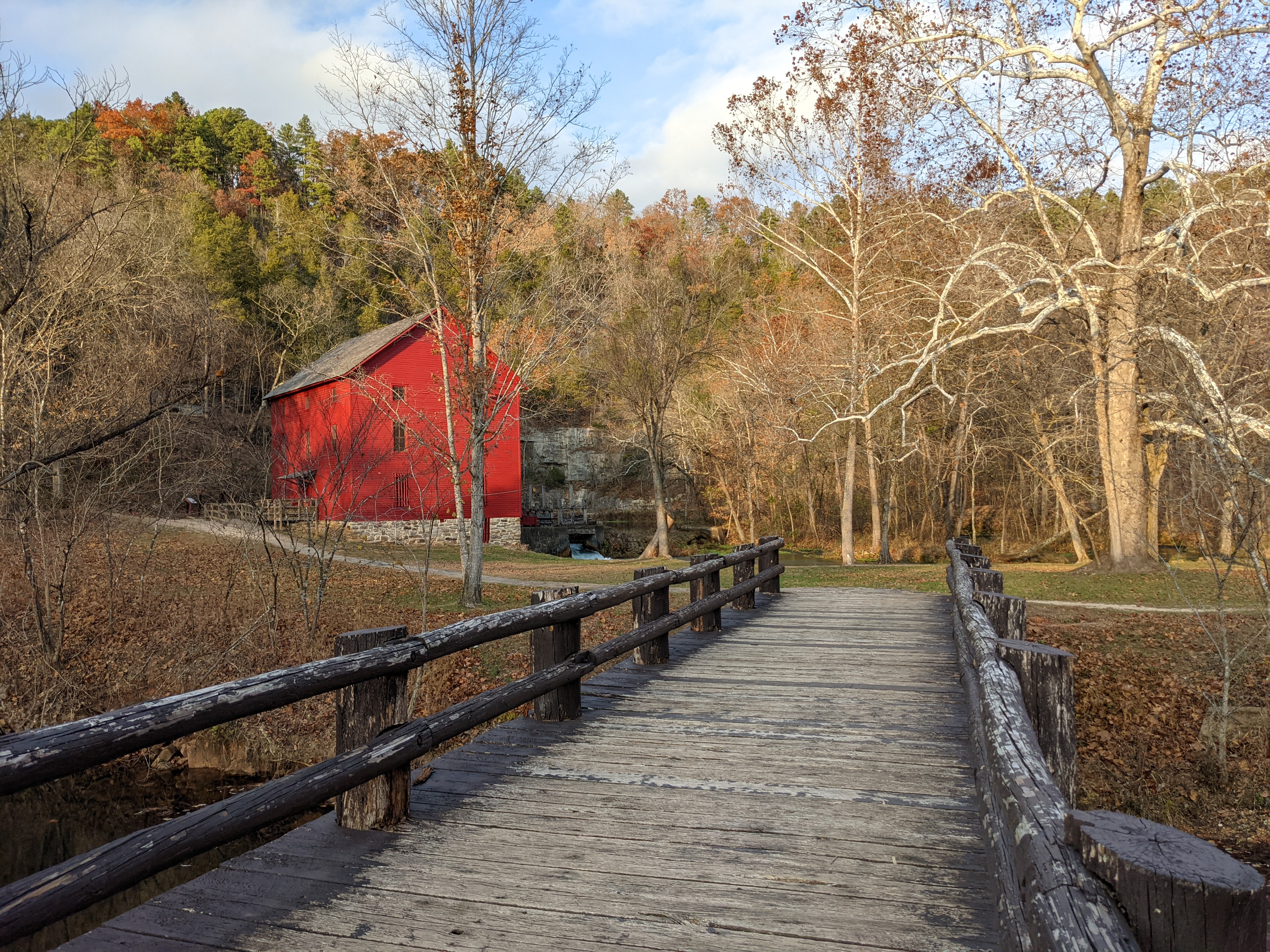
Alley Springs Mill in autumn
