= Compton Creek (Missouri) =

Stream in Missouri, United States

Coordinates: 36.7142234°N 90.9167920°W

Compton Creek is a stream in Ripley County in the U.S. state of Missouri. It is a tributary of the Current River.

Compton Creek has the name of John Compton, a pioneer citizen.

== See also ==
- List of rivers of Missouri
