= Big Spring (Missouri) =

Spring in Missouri

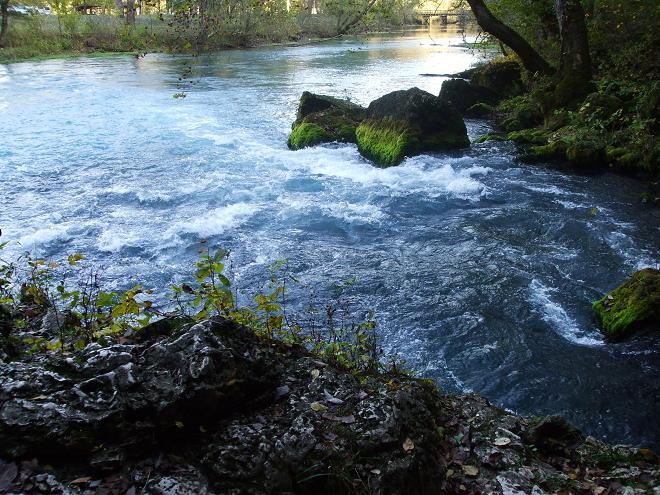
- Big Spring in Missouri is the largest spring in the Ozarks. Pictured here at 240 cu ft/s (6.8 m^{3}/s) experiencing low flow after an extended dry period.

Location
- Country: United States
- State: Missouri
- Region: Ozark Plateau

Physical characteristics
- Source: Eleven Point River watershed
  - location: Salem Plateau, Ozark Plateau, Missouri
- Mouth: Current River (Missouri)
  - location: near Van Buren, Carter County, Ozark Plateau, Missouri
  - coordinates: 36°57′08″N 90°59′39″W
  - elevation: 429 ft (131 m)
- Length: 0.2 mi (0.32 km)
- Discharge
  - location: Big Spring (Missouri)
  - average: 470 cu ft/s (13 m^{3}/s)
  - minimum: 236 cu ft/s (6.7 m^{3}/s)
  - maximum: 2,000 cu ft/s (57 m^{3}/s)

Big Spring is one of the largest springs in the United States and the world. An enormous first magnitude spring, it rises at the base of a bluff on the west side of the Current River valley in the Missouri Ozarks.

== Location ==
Located about four miles downstream from Van Buren, it is within the boundaries of the Ozark National Scenic Riverways, and its visitor facilities are managed by the National Park Service. It is a contributing resource to Big Spring Historic District, listed on the National Register of Historic Places in 1981.

== Description ==
The average flow of 470 cubic feet (13,000 L) of water per second from Big Spring constitutes the second-largest tributary of the Current River. The spring is by far the largest spring in the Ozark Plateau region. The only two springs in the Ozark region that approach the size of Big Spring are Greer Spring and Mammoth Spring. The maximum discharge of Big Spring must be estimated because backwater from the Current River makes accurate high-water measurements impossible.

== The spring outlet ==
The spring issues from the base of a limestone bluff, churning out aqua-blue water with great force, creating whitecaps, then quickly calming to a crystal-clear channel. The spring water travels about 1,000 feet (300 m), where it adds itself to the Current River. The water is about 58 °F (14 °C), and the spring is surrounded by a well-maintained park and a steep valley hillside covered in hardwood forest. Most of the known drainage basin encompasses northern areas of the Eleven Point River watershed. Big Spring is ever-increasing in size, as the groundwater continues to dissolve limestone in a vast karst system, and continues to capture streams in greater quantities. The spring is estimated to dissolve and remove 175 tons of limestone in an average day. The amounts of limestone dissolved and removed by the spring system in one year is estimated to equal a one-mile-long (1.6 km) cave 30 feet (9.1 m) high and 50 feet (15 m) wide, though that amount is dispersed among all parts of the karst system.

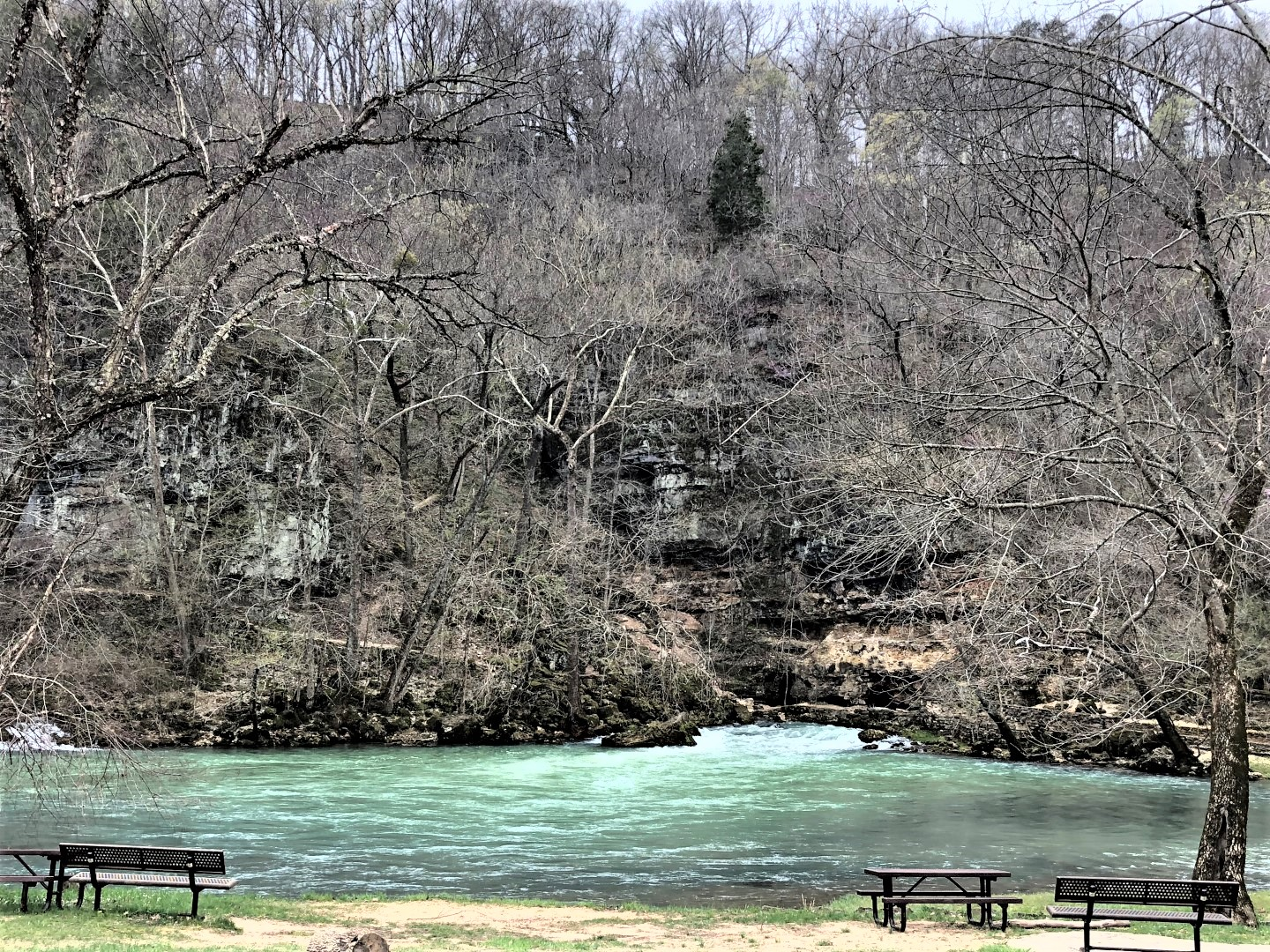
Big Spring rises at the base of a limestone bluff

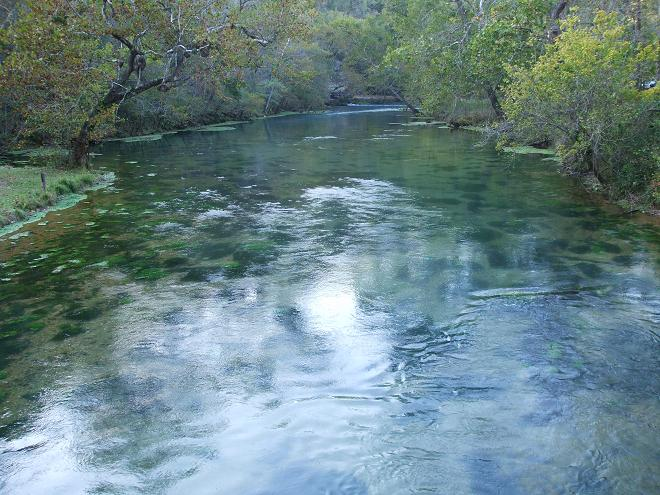
Spring branch from Big Spring in Missouri flowing toward the Current River.

== See also ==
- List of Ozark springs
- Karst spring
