= Eleven Point National Wild and Scenic River =

National scenic river in the Ozarks of Missouri, USA

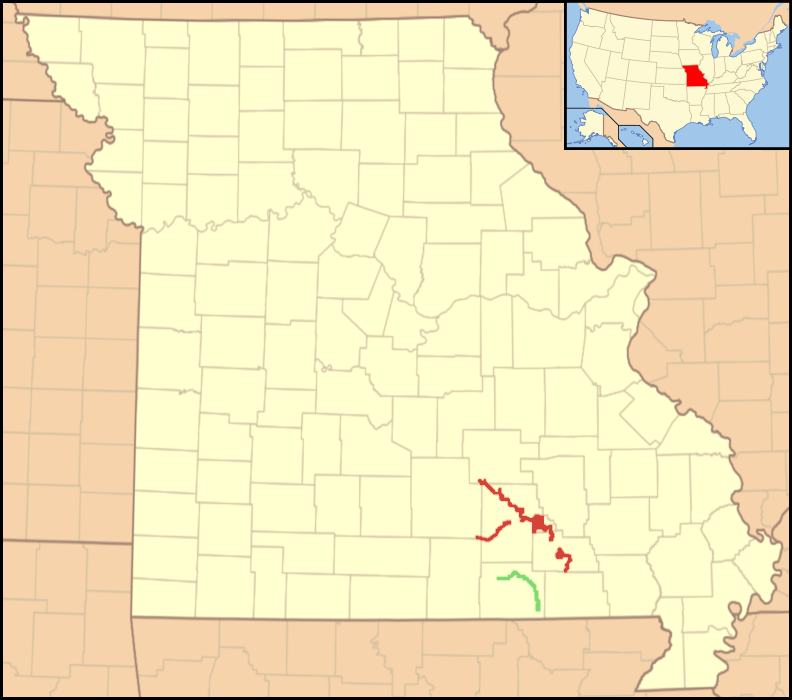
- The Eleven Point National Wild and Scenic River shown in green, and the nearby Ozark National Scenic Riverways in red
- Location: Oregon County, Missouri
- Nearest city: West Plains, Missouri
- Coordinates: 36°47′42″N 91°19′57″W
- Area: 27,000 acres (109 km^{2})
- Established: 1968-10-02
- Governing body: National Forest Service – Mark Twain National Forest
- Website: web.archive.org/web/20110930142247/http://www.rivers.gov/wsr-eleven-point.html

The Eleven Point National Wild and Scenic River is a 44-mile (71 km) stretch of the spring-fed Eleven Point River in the Ozarks of southern Missouri set aside through eminent domain for preservation by Congress in 1968. The designated part of the river stretches from Thomasville to State Highway 142. The river was included in the original proposal for the Ozark National Scenic Riverways, but it was ultimately excluded when the Riverways were designated on the Current and Jacks Fork rivers in 1964.

It is one of the original eight rivers named under the Wild and Scenic Rivers Act as possessing "outstandingly remarkable scenic, recreational, geologic, fish and wildlife, historic, cultural or other similar values." The Eleven Point holds the scenic designation within the National Wild and Scenic Rivers system, meaning that it is free of impoundments, with shorelines or watersheds still largely primitive and shorelines largely undeveloped, but accessible in places by roads. The river isn't actually wilderness, many old homesites, fences, farms, and roads were located along the river, but in only a few decades have since been reclaimed by nature. Only about half of the land in the designated area is public, owned by the National Forest Service. The government holds a scenic easement on other land within the area that preserves its character for the future, but which does not allow public access to privately held land.

Being a river, naturally, the area is best visited by boat. Canoeing is the most popular way to visit, while johnboats are frequently used by fishermen. Smallmouth bass, rock bass, walleye, and trout are among a variety game fish found in the river. There are minimally developed float camps along the river that are accessible by boat, and dispersed camping on gravel bars is allowed.

== See also ==
- List of National Wild and Scenic Rivers
