= National river =

National river may refer to:

- National symbol of the country it is located in
- A type of park operated by National Park Service. Currently there are 4 such parks:
  - Big South Fork National River and Recreation Area
  - Buffalo National River
  - Mississippi National River and Recreation Area
  - Ozark National Scenic Riverways
