= Echo Bluff State Park =

State park in Missouri, United States

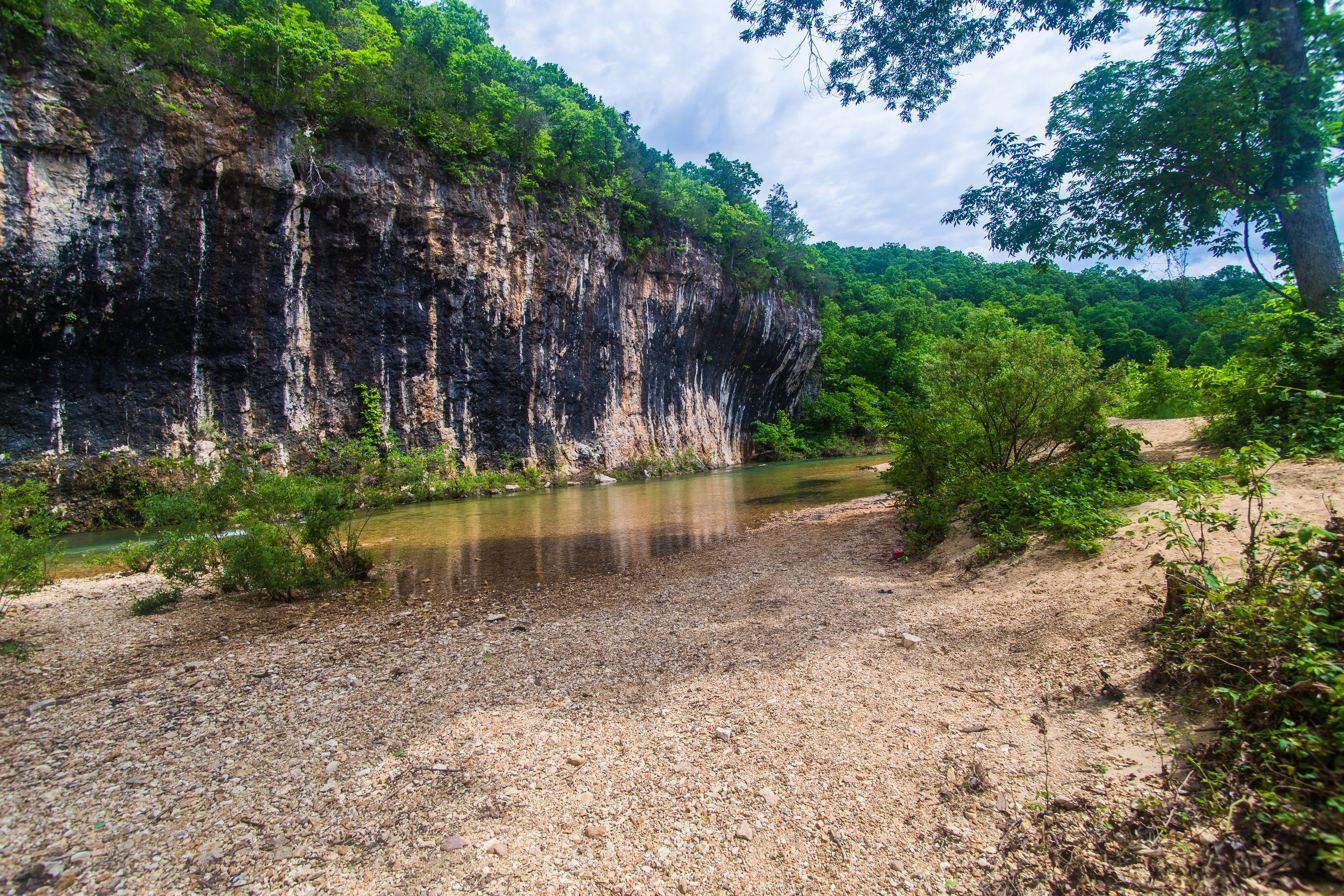
- Echo Bluff State Park, May 2019

- Location within Missouri Location within the United States
- Location: Newton Township, Shannon County, Missouri, United States
- Coordinates: 37°18′41″N 91°24′22″W
- Area: 476.62 acres (192.88 ha)
- Established: 2013
- Administrator: Missouri Department of Natural Resources
- Visitors: 249,223 (in 2022)
- Website: Official website

Echo Bluff State Park (4.6 out of 5 stars) is a public recreation area comprising 476 acres (193 ha) of land in Newton Township, Shannon County, Missouri, United States. The state park occupies the site of former Camp Zoe, a summer camp for children that opened in 1929. The park was named for the massive cliff that towers over one side of Sinking Creek.

== History ==
The state acquired the former Camp Zoe site at auction from the federal government in 2013 for $640,000. An additional 80 acres was purchased for $455,000. Some $52 million was spent building a new lodge, playground, campgrounds, pavilions, and cabins. Federal grant money totalling $10.5 million helped pay for improving area roads and creating a new bridge over Sinking Creek. The park opened to the public on July 30, 2016.

== Activities and amenities ==
The park features a lodge, cabins and campsites for overnight stays, bluff-top shelter for special events, and 50-seat amphitheater as well as hiking and mountain biking trails.

== See also ==
- Schwagstock
