= Sinkin, Missouri =

Extinct hamlet in Missouri, U.S.

Coordinates: 37°21′27″N 91°22′18″W

Sinkin is an extinct town in northern Shannon County, in the U.S. state of Missouri. The community was located on a sharp meander in Sinking Creek at an area known as The Sinks where the stream goes underground for a short distance.

A post office called Sinkin was established in 1869, and remained in operation until 1933. The community took its name from nearby Sinking Creek.
