= Chilton-Williams Farm Complex =

- U.S. National Register of Historic Places
- U.S. Historic district
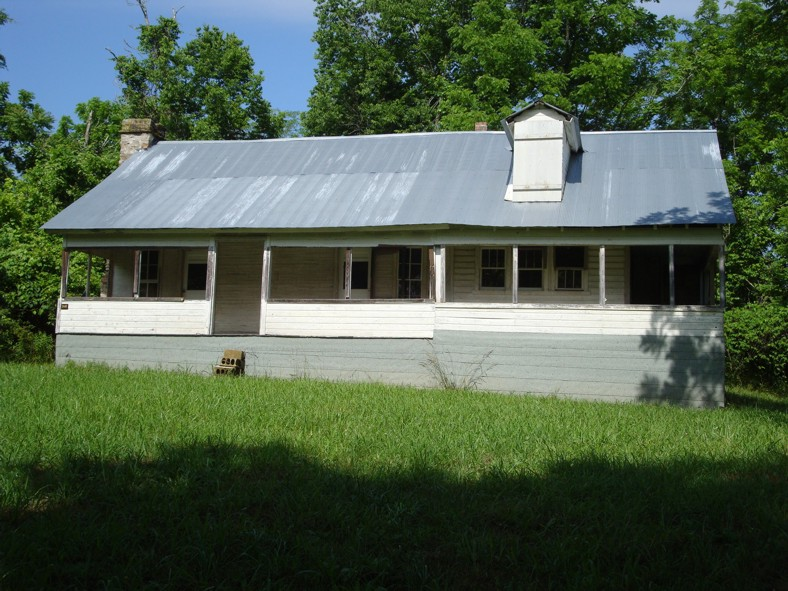

- Location within Missouri Location within the United States
- Location: E of Eminence off MO 106, near Eminence, Missouri
- Coordinates: 37°11′02″N 91°11′25″W
- Area: 56 acres (23 ha)
- Built: 1869
- NRHP reference No.: 81000696
- Added to NRHP: September 2, 1981

Chilton-Williams Farm Complex, also known as Chilton Place, is a historic farm complex and national historic district located in the Ozark National Scenic Riverways near Eminence, Shannon County, Missouri. The district encompasses 15 contributing buildings and 2 contributing structures associated with a post-American Civil War Ozark farm. It developed between about 1869 and 1879 and includes the Chilton House, Williams-Baltz House, gambrel roofed barn, four small barns, two corn cribs, smokehouse, five sheds, privy, storm cellar, and chicken house.

It was listed on the National Register of Historic Places in 1981.
