= Greer, Missouri =

Unincorporated community in Missouri, U.S.

Coordinates: 36°46′10″N 91°21′12″W

Greer is an unincorporated community in Oregon County, in the U.S. state of Missouri. Greer lies on Missouri Route 19 between Alton to the south-southwest and Winona to the north. Route 19 crosses the Eleven Point River at Greer Crossing, approximately three miles northeast of the village. Greer Spring lies just to the north of the community.

== History ==
A post office called Greer was established in 1890, and remained in operation until 1941. The community has the name of Samuel Greer, Civil War veteran and pioneer citizen.
