= Klenn Creek =

Stream in the American state of Missouri

Coordinates: 36.585337°N 90.856789°W

Klenn Creek is a stream in Ripley County in the U.S. state of Missouri. It is a tributary of the Current River.

Klenn Creek has the name of Frank Klenn, the original owner of the site.

== See also ==
- List of rivers of Missouri
