= George Rufus Kenamore =

American politician

George Rufus Kenamore (1846-1928) was an American merchant, politician and government employee in Missouri during the late 19th century.

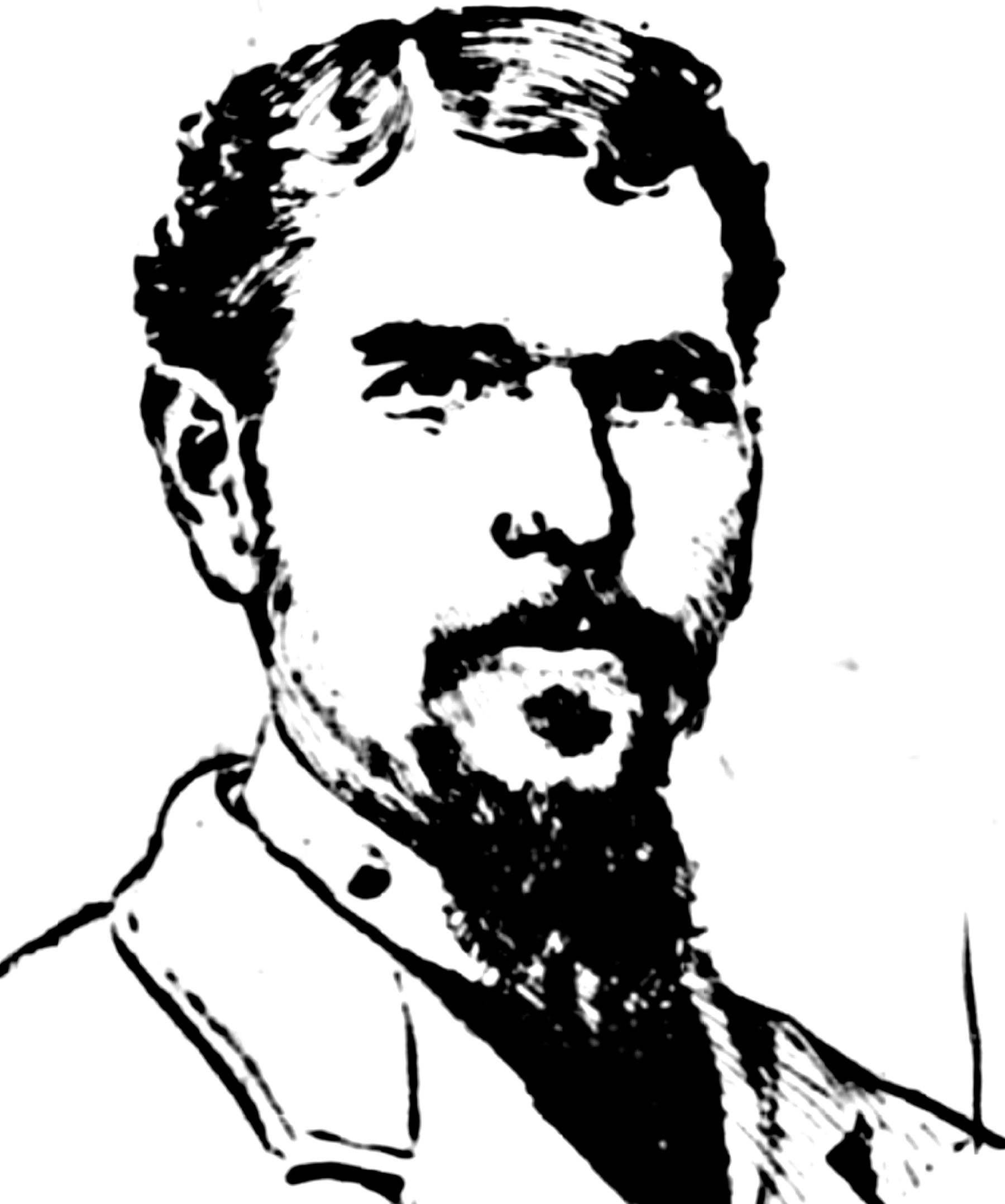
G.R. Kenamore, 1899

Kenamore was born in Maury County, Tennessee, on January 19, 1846, to Grant Allen Kenamore of Tennessee and Emily Frances Kenamore or Emily London of North Carolina. The family moved to Dent County, Missouri, about 1856 and lived for a time a mile north of Salem, to which they relocated in 1857.

He was educated in the common schools of Salem and at the age of 16 he enlisted in Company D of the 48th Missouri Infantry Volunteers and served throughout the Civil War, after which Missouri Governor Thomas C. Fletcher appointed him captain of a local company of the state militia.

In 1872 Kenamore worked for A.H. and H.B. Clark in their general store in Salem and was sent by them to Eminence, Missouri, with a stock of goods, where he operated a store on their behalf until he returned to Salem about 1885.

A lifelong Democrat, Kenamore cast his first vote for Horatio Seymour in 1868 and was elected treasurer of Shannon County, Missouri, for four years and served as representative of Dent County for four years.

== Government employment ==
=== Federal ===
In November 1887, Kenamore was made deputy U.S. internal revenue collector under Freeman Barnum. He took part in the arrest of alleged whisky moonshiners James and Ed Pickett in January 1888. He was later promoted to have charge of twenty counties in Southern Missouri.

=== State ===
On August 31, 1899, Governor Lon V. Stephens appointed him as the first inspector of beer and malt liquors for the state of Missouri, at $3,000 a year, to be headquartered in St. Louis. The St. Louis Post-Dispatch reported that "Democratic politicians were surprised" by the appointment because few of them knew Kenamore, and "they lay his appointment entirely to the influence of Senator Frank Ferris of Crawford County." The newspaper said that brewers had vowed to fight a new law which placed them under regulation of state tax authorities.

The Post-Dispatch said that Kenamore "expects opposition, but says he will carry to contest to the highest court if necessary to decide the validity of the law," adding that "He is past middle age, wears chin whiskers and looks a good deal like a well-to-do farmer."

Kenamore's position ended when newly elected Governor Alexander Monroe Dockery withdrew the earlier governor's nomination, which had never been approved by the State legislature.

In 1909 Kenamore applied to Governor Lon Vest Stephens for appointment as the Democratic member of the St. Louis Board of Election Commissioners.

== Family life ==
George Rufus Kenamore and Emma Creager Henthorne were married on December 23, 1873, and to them were born Rufus Clair, Charles, and Don.

Rufus, the father, became a member of the Union Avenue Christian Church in St. Louis about 1913. He died at the age of 82 in St. Louis, Missouri, on April 6, 1928, the funeral being held in Salem on April 8.

After his death, his surviving sons, Rufus Clair and Charles, gave a family collection of books and an heirloom bookcase to the public library in a new community building in Salem.

== Additional reading ==
- "Kenamore Asked Them to Obey," St. Louis Post-Dispatch, April 12,1900, image 8 More information on his fight to remain beer inspector.
