= Buttin Rock School =

- U.S. National Register of Historic Places
- U.S. Historic district
- Location within Missouri Location within the United States
- Location: E bank of Current R., S of Powder Mill Ferry, Ozark National Scenic Riverways, near Eminence, Missouri
- Coordinates: 37°19′26″N 91°26′10″W
- Area: 2 acres (0.81 ha)
- Built: 1913
- Architectural style: Vernacular schoolhouse
- MPS: Missouri Ozarks Rural Schools MPS
- NRHP reference No.: 91000605
- Added to NRHP: May 31, 1991

Button Rock School, also known as the Buttin School, and District #85 School, is a historic one-room school building and national historic district located in the Ozark National Scenic Riverways near Eminence, Shannon County, Missouri. The school was built in 1913, and is a one-story, rectangular frame building on a pier foundation. It has a gable roof and is sheathed in novelty siding painted white. Also on the property is a contributing frame privy.

It was listed on the National Register of Historic Places in 1991.
