= Walter Klepzig Mill and Farm =

- U.S. National Register of Historic Places
- U.S. Historic district
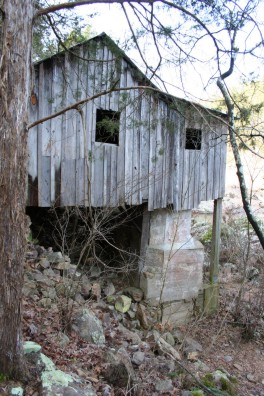
- Klepzig Mill

- Location within Missouri Location within the United States
- Location: Along Rocky Creek in Ozark National Scenic Riverway, near Eminence, Missouri
- Coordinates: 37°07′30″N 91°11′58″W
- Area: 121 acres (49 ha)
- Built: 1912
- Built by: Klepzig, Walter; Brandt, Arthur C.
- Architectural style: Sawmill; box
- NRHP reference No.: 90000001
- Added to NRHP: February 13, 1990

Walter Klepzig Mill and Farm is a historic farm and sawmill and national historic district located in the Ozark National Scenic Riverways near Eminence, Shannon County, Missouri. The district encompasses three contributing buildings, three contributing sites, and one contributing structure associated with an early-20th century Ozark farm and mill. It developed between about 1912 and 1936 and includes the mill (c. 1912) and its related hydraulic system (c. 1912-1935); a spring house and smokehouse (c. 1920-1925); foundations of a 1923 farmhouse and barn (c. 1920-1925); and two post-1934 chicken coops and a ruin of a post-1934 machine shed.

It was listed on the National Register of Historic Places in 1990.
