= Clair Kenamore =

American journalist

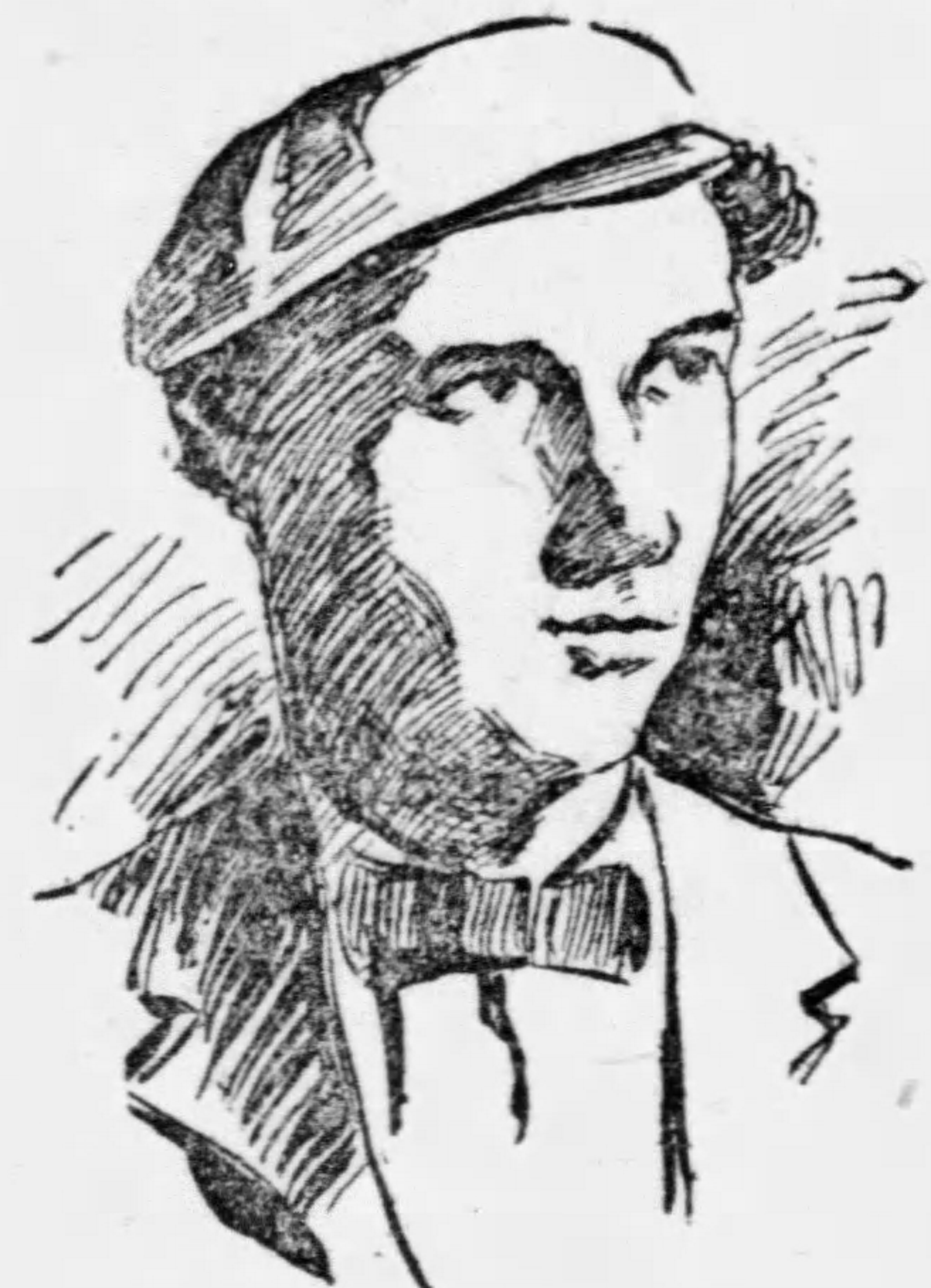
Kenamore in 1897

Rufus Clair Kenamore (c. 1875 – November 3, 1935) was an American journalist who was a foreign correspondent and editor on the St. Louis Post-Dispatch newspaper in the early 20th century.

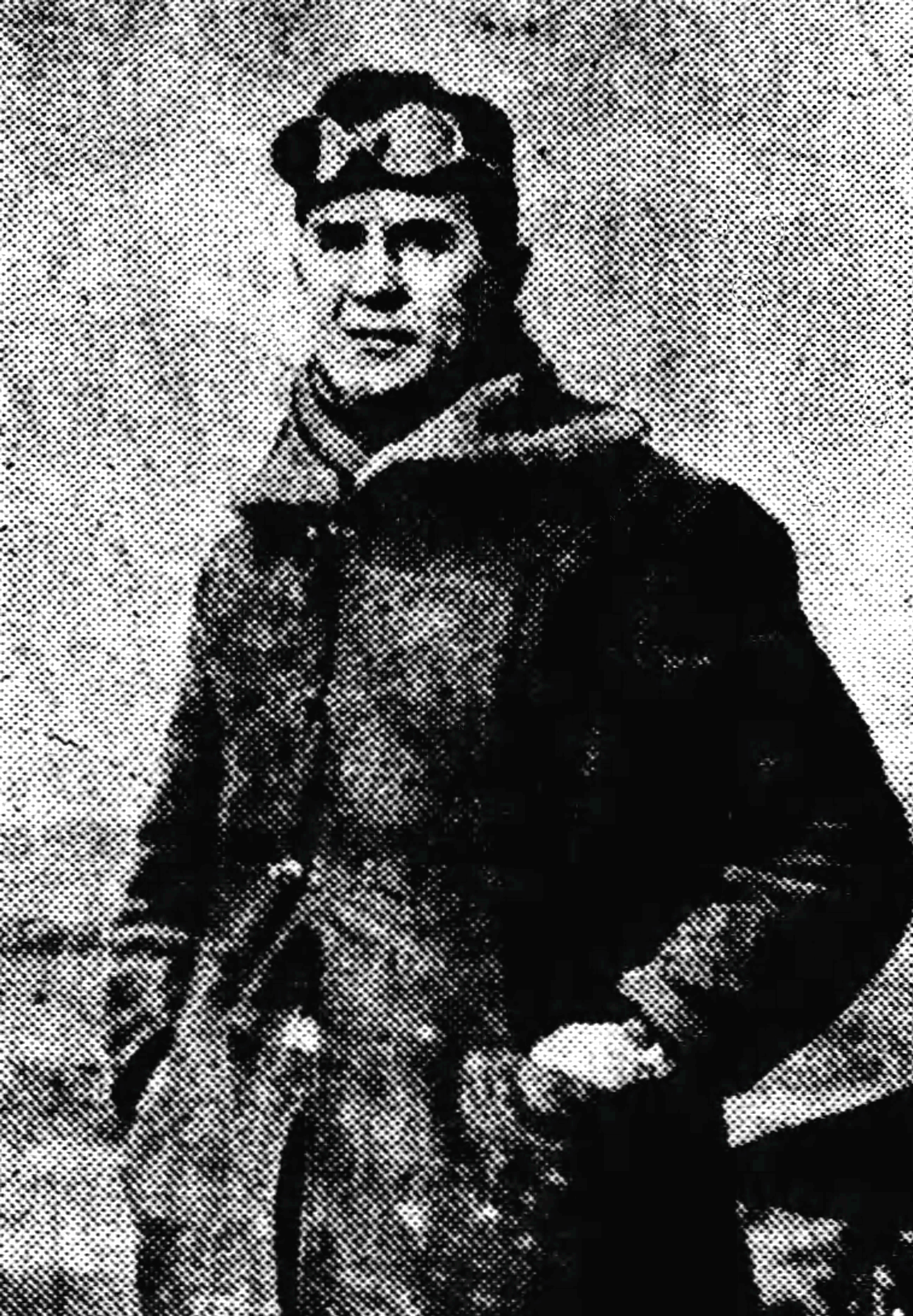
Kenamore in 1918

== Personal ==
Rufus Clair Kenamore was born in 1875 or 1876 in Eminence, Missouri, the son of Emma Kenamore and George R. Kenamore, who represented Dent County in 1890 in the State Legislature. He had two brothers, Charles B. and Don.

He was a college graduate at age 21 when he and a friend, Paul H. Sankey, stopped in St. Louis and announced they were on their way to the Klondike in Canada to prospect for gold with three other people.

Kenamore and Marguerite Martyn, a reporter and artist on the Post-Dispatch, were married in Martyn's home at Lake and Bompart avenues in Webster Groves, Missouri, on May 17, 1913.

After the death of father George R. Kenamore in 1928, Clair Kenamore and his brother, Charles, gave a family collection of books to the public library in a new community building in Salem, Missouri.

In 1931, a lung condition made it necessary for him to move to a drier climate in Tucson, Arizona. Kenamore died of tuberculosis in Portland, Oregon, on November 3, 1935.

== Career ==
Kenamore's early professional life as a journalist was with the St. Louis Republic, and for a time he worked in Chicago. Kenamore joined the Post-Dispatch editorial staff in October 1907 and was a telegraph editor, feature writer and Sunday magazine editor.

In 1916 he was a correspondent and went into Mexico with General Pershing's expeditionary force. During World War I, he went to France, where he accompanied troops of the 35th Division of Missouri and Kansas and covered the St. Mihiel and Argonne-Meuse campaigns.

Returning from Europe in 1919, he authored a book, From Vauquois Hill to Exermont, which was a history of the 35th Division. Later, he wrote History of the 139th Infantry.

He was sent on assignment to Europe in 1927 to get information for the 50th anniversary edition of the Post-Dispatch, which was published on December 9, 1928. He interviewed H.G. Wells, Sir Philip Gibbs, Andre Siegfried, Count Hermann Keyserling, J.B.S. Haldane, Guglielmo Ferrero, Maxim Gorky, Martin Anderson Nexo, Bertrand Russell, Albert Einstein, Rudolph M. Holzapfel and Benedetto Croce.

In the 1930s, Kenamore covered stories in Europe, particularly in Soviet Russia. After moving from St. Louis, he covered stories in the Southwest and Pacific Northwest.
