= Rhinehart Ranch =

Historic house in Missouri, United States

- U.S. National Register of Historic Places
- Location within Missouri Location within the United States
- Location: NW of Eminence, near Eminence, Missouri
- Coordinates: 37°15′3″N 91°26′46″W
- Area: less than one acre
- Built: 1907
- Architectural style: I-house
- NRHP reference No.: 80002395
- Added to NRHP: November 14, 1980

Rhinehart Ranch, also known as Spring Valley Ranch, is a historic home located near Eminence, Shannon County, Missouri. It was built in 1907, and is a two-story vernacular I-house with a one-story rear wing. It features a double verandah on the front facade.

It was listed on the National Register of Historic Places in 1980.
