= Alton Club =

Historic place in Missouri, United States

- U.S. National Register of Historic Places
- U.S. Historic district
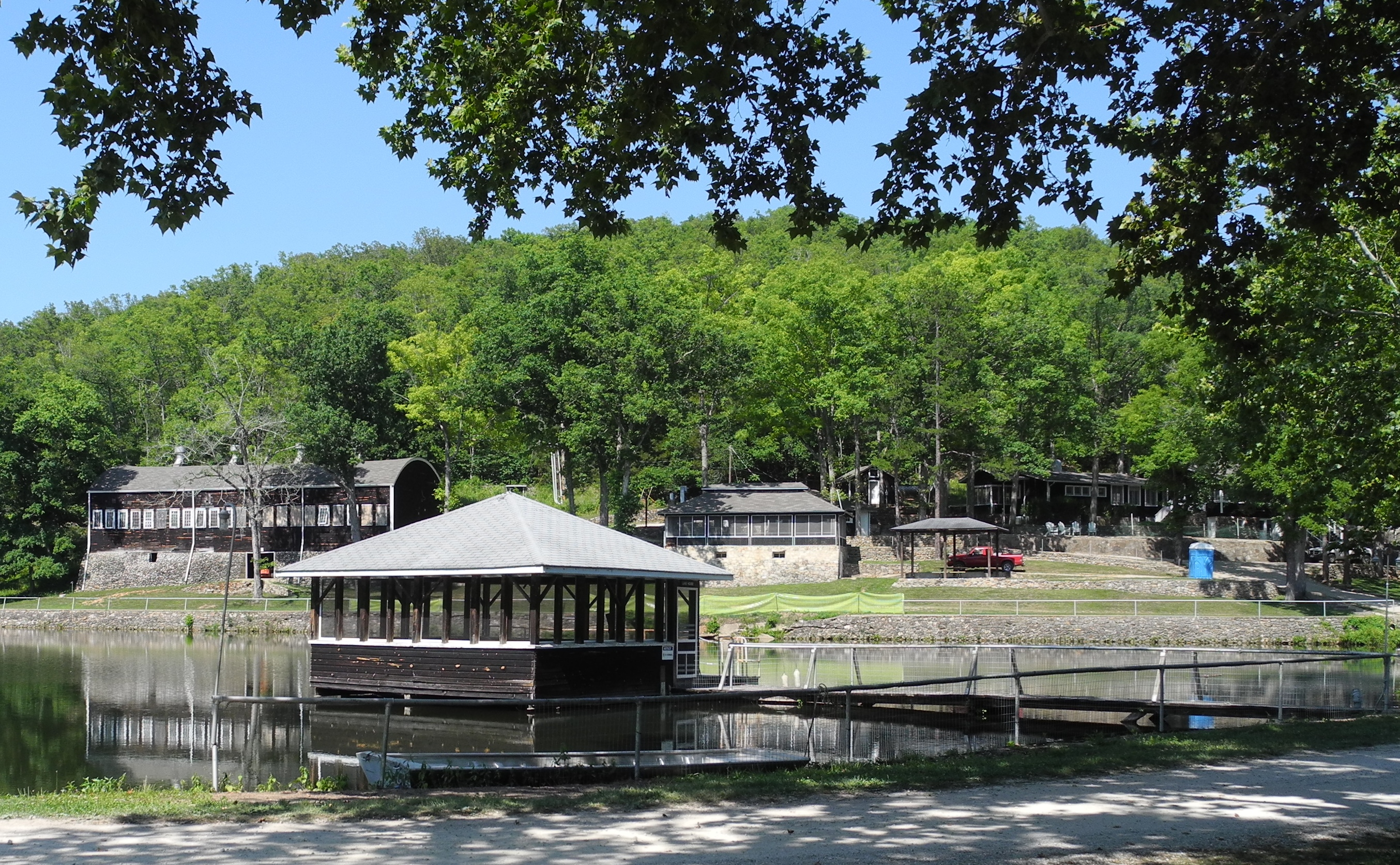
- Alton Club, June 2012

- Location within Missouri Location within the United States
- Location: Gravel road, 1.5 mi. W of MO 19 and 12 Mi. N of Eminence, near Eminence, Missouri
- Coordinates: 37°19′26″N 91°26′10″W
- Area: 35 acres (14 ha)
- Architectural style: rustic
- NRHP reference No.: 05001162
- Added to NRHP: October 14, 2005

Alton Club, also known as the Jerry J. Presley Conservation Education Center, is a historic summer camp and national historic district located in the Current River State Park near Eminence, Shannon County, Missouri. The district encompasses 14 contributing buildings, 3 contributing sites, and 6 contributing structures associated with a summer retreat for the employees and customers of the Alton Box Board Company. It developed between about 1937 and 1945 and include the Main Lodge (c. 1938, c. 1985), Classroom / Pool Hall (c. 1940), Lower Dorm (c. 1940), Gymnasium (c. 1940), Barbeque House (c. 1940), Lake House (c. 1940), Manager's Residence (c. 1945), and Entrance Columns (c. 1940).

It was listed on the National Register of Historic Places in 2005.
