= Alley Spring Roller Mill =

- U.S. National Register of Historic Places
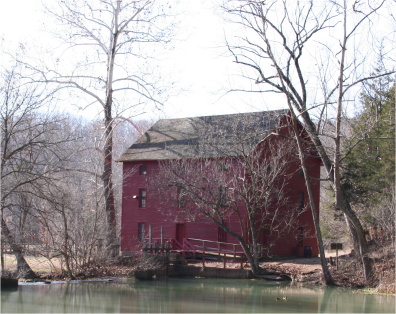
- Alley Spring Roller Mill

- Location within Missouri Location within the United States
- Location: W of Eminence off MO 106, near Eminence, Missouri
- Coordinates: 37°9′15″N 91°26′31″W
- Area: 2 acres (0.81 ha)
- Built: 1893
- Built by: McCaskill, George W.
- NRHP reference No.: 81000336
- Added to NRHP: December 8, 1981

The Alley Spring Roller Mill, also known as Red Mill, is a historic grist mill located in the Ozark National Scenic Riverways near Eminence, Shannon County, Missouri. It was built in 1893, and is a 2 1/2-story, rectangular frame building on a limestone block foundation. It measures 32 feet by 42 feet and houses four steel rollers and a single stone burr.

In 2017, the mill was featured in the U.S. Mint America the Beautiful Quarters series. The design is an image of Alley Mill that was created by Ron Sanders and sculpted by Renata Gordon.

It was listed on the National Register of Historic Places in 1981.

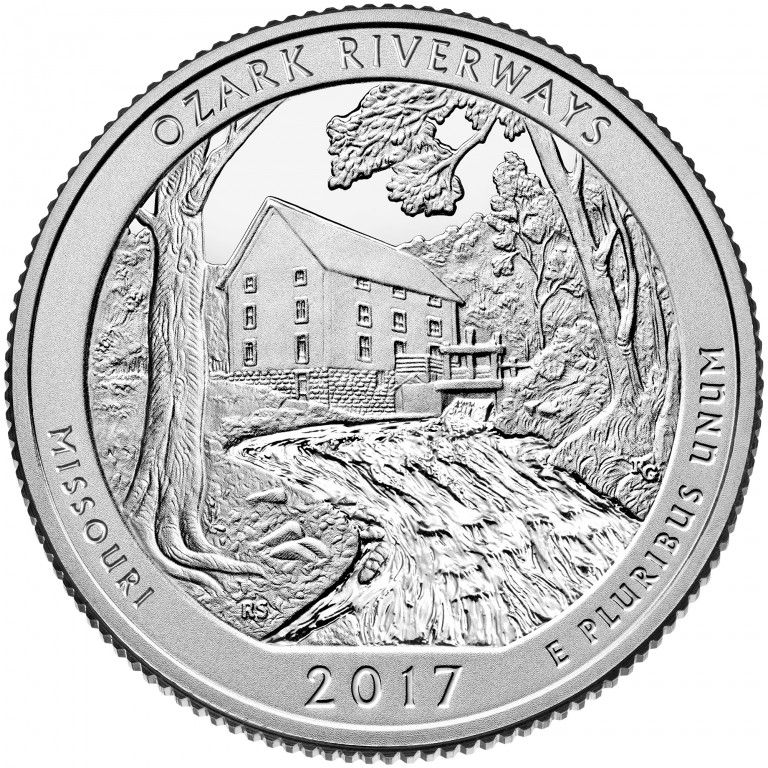
Alley Mill was depicted for Missouri's America the Beautiful quarter
