= Current River Township, Ripley County, Missouri =

Township in Ripley County, Missouri, U.S.

Coordinates: 36.5208°N 90.8447°W

Current River Township is an inactive township in Ripley County, in the U.S. state of Missouri.

Current River Township takes its name from the Current River.
