= Reed Log House =

- U.S. National Register of Historic Places
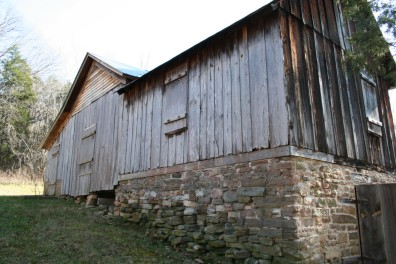
- Reed Log House

- Location within Missouri Location within the United States
- Location: Along Current R. S of Powder Mill Ferry, Ozark National Scenic Riverways, near Eminence, Missouri
- Coordinates: 37°9′10″N 91°10′07″W
- Area: 17.5 acres (7.1 ha)
- Built: 1857
- Architectural style: Vernacular Ozark
- NRHP reference No.: 91000456
- Added to NRHP: April 29, 1991

Reed Log House, also known as Macy Cabin, Prather House and Keller House , is a historic home located in the Ozark National Scenic Riverways near Eminence, Shannon County, Missouri. It was built in 1857, with two additions dating from about 1885 and 1910. It is a one-story, vernacular Ozark pine log structure with vertical board siding on a stone foundation.

It was listed on the National Register of Historic Places in 1991.
