= Schwagstock =

Music festival in Missouri, U.S.

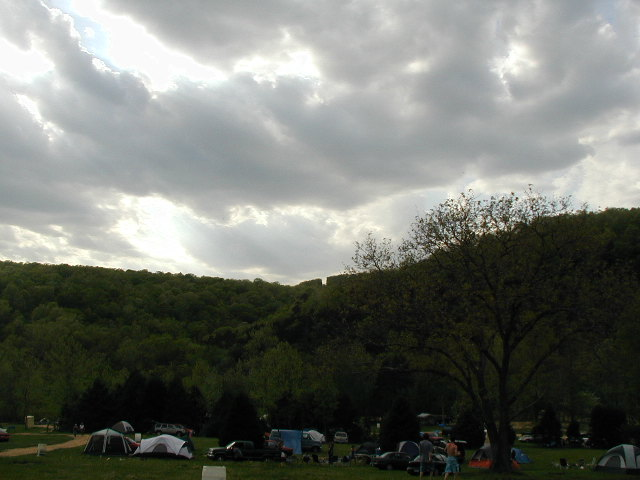
- Genre: Jam band music; rock music; crafts
- Locations: Shannon County, Missouri, U.S.
- Years active: 1992–present
- Founders: The Schwag

Schwagstock is a music festival that takes place outdoors over the course of a weekend. It was intended to carry on the vibe of the Woodstock festival. Food, trinkets, glassware, carvings, beads, blankets, tie-dye clothing, and many other handmade and hippie-appeal items were available for sale by individual vendors. Attendees were allowed to camp anywhere they wished on the campgrounds, and could choose to set up tents or to camp in their vehicles instead. Music was scheduled such that there were several overlapping live music acts between the main stage and the sideshow(s) from early afternoon until early morning. Past Schwagstocks have been held at Lesterville, Leasburg and Bagnell Dam in Missouri, and in Iowa, but between 2004 and 2010 all Schwagstocks were held at Camp Zoe, south of Salem, Shannon County, Missouri. Currently, Schwagenstock is held at Mother Nature's Riverfront Retreat, in Macks Creek, Missouri.

== Activities ==
Aside from camping and the concerts, attendees can swim, canoe, hike, float down the river, and explore caves. Camp Zoe has about 370 acres of land that can be explored. There are bluffs, caves, beaches, creeks, trees, ferns, hills, and natural wildlife. Zoe is surrounded by thousands of acres of national forest and private timber reserves.

== Band history ==
The Schwag was a band created in 1992 by Jimmy Tebeau and Tracy Lowe. In their own words, The Schwag is "a band out to preserve and perpetuate the vibe and music made popular by the Grateful Dead." The band has played over 1500 shows since then, in at least 18 U.S. states. Notable guest performers have included Mike Gordon, Butch Trucks, Chuck Berry, Vince Welnick, Melvin Seals, Michael Kang, Bill Nershi, Michael Travis, Jason Hann, Mike and Liz from Rusted Root, Merl Saunders, Keller Williams, Fred Tackett of Little Feat, Johnnie Johnson, and Devon Allman. The other members of the band arrive and depart as conditions dictate. The lineup usually consists of Jimmy; a guitar player (such as Eric Eisen from the Helping Phriendly band, Michael Kang of The String Cheese Incident, Shawn Guyot (deceased), Tim Moody, Darrell Lea, Brad Sarno, Tracy Lowe, Nick Romanoff (deceased); a keyboard/organ player, Jack Kirkner and a drummer (such as Tony Antonelli Dave Klein, Dino English, Cannon DeWeese.

Tebeau founded Schwagstock in the 1990s as a family affair, but it later grew into a proper music festival.

In 2005, the Missouri House of Representatives passed a resolution applauding Jimmy Tebeau for his "entrepreneurial spirit and creative skills". A plaque commemorating the resolution was presented to Jimmy at a 2005 Schwagstock.

== Legal issues ==
On November 8, 2010, the United States Drug Enforcement Administration filed court documents alleging that the Schwagstock festival is the site of widespread, rampant use and sales of illegal drugs. Investigations dated back to 2006 until November 1, 2010, when Camp Zoe was raided. The property seizure was made possible under 21 USC § 856, which allows for federal seizure and civil forfeiture of a property used primarily for drug activity. The move marks the only time the federal "crackhouse law" was ever used against the owner of a music festival venue; as corporations are immune from such seizure, had Tebeau, the venue operator, incorporated his ownership under an LLC, there could have been no seizure. After the seizure, Camp Zoe was developed into a corporate retreat and state park. Due to this incident, Tebeau served a year in prison.

== See also ==
- List of jam band music festivals
