= List of Ozark springs =

This is a list of natural springs in the Ozark Plateau ordered by spring magnitude. Different sources may give differing values for average daily flow of the same spring. This can result from different measuring methodologies and from a varying number of observations over different timespans. The sources for the flow data presented here are cited in the footnotes. The majority of these springs have been measured less than 10 times, at random intervals. The exceptions are Big Spring, Greer Spring, Mammoth Spring, Bennett Spring, Maramec Spring, Alley Spring, and Round Spring, which have all been measured for more than 3 years on a daily basis by the United States Geological Survey (USGS).

== List ==
Some sources give million gallons per day, which is equivalent to 1.547229 ft^{3}/s. Some second magnitude springs could be considered first magnitude, and vice versa, depending on the data used. This list includes only some of the larger second order springs, and the number of third magnitude springs in the Ozarks numbers in the thousands.

List
Rank	Spring	Location	Average volume per second (ft^{3}/s)	Image
1	Big Spring	Carter County, Missouri	470 ft^{3} (13 m^{3})	
2	Greer Spring	Oregon County, Missouri	360 ft^{3} (10 m^{3})	
3	Mammoth Spring	Fulton County, Arkansas	347 ft^{3} (9.8 m^{3})	
4	Bennett Spring	Dallas County, Missouri	185 ft^{3} (5.2 m^{3})	Bennett Spring
5	Double Spring	Ozark County, Missouri	154.7 ft^{3} (4.38 m^{3})	
6	Maramec Spring	Phelps County, Missouri	148.5 ft^{3} (4.21 m^{3})	
7	Blue Spring	Shannon County, Missouri	139.3 ft^{3} (3.94 m^{3})	
8	Alley Spring	Shannon County, Missouri	125.3 ft^{3} (3.55 m^{3})	Alley Spring and Mill in November 2021
9	Welch Spring	Shannon County, Missouri	116 ft^{3} (3.3 m^{3})	
10	Boiling Spring	Pulaski County, Missouri	105.3 ft^{3} (2.98 m^{3})	
11	North Fork Spring	Ozark County, Missouri	71.4 ft^{3} (2.02 m^{3})	
12	Blue Spring	Oregon County, Missouri	71.9 ft^{3} (2.04 m^{3})	
13	Montauk Spring	Dent County, Missouri	82.0 ft^{3} (2.32 m^{3})	
14	Hahatonka Spring	Camden County, Missouri	74.3 ft^{3} (2.10 m^{3})	
15	Roubidoux Spring	Pulaski County, Missouri	58.3 ft^{3} (1.65 m^{3})	RoubSpring
16	Blue Spring (inundated by Lake Wappapello)	Wayne County, Missouri	54.8 ft^{3} (1.55 m^{3})	
17	Round Spring	Shannon County, Missouri	40 ft^{3} (1.1 m^{3})	
18	Pulltight Spring	Shannon County, Missouri	45.5 ft^{3} (1.29 m^{3})	
19	Roaring River Spring	Barry County, Missouri	31 ft^{3} (0.88 m^{3})	Roaring River Spring
19	Cave Spring	Shannon County, Missouri	32.4 ft^{3} (0.92 m^{3})	

== See also ==
- List of Missouri rivers
- List of Arkansas rivers
