= Greer Spring =

Spring in the Mark Twain National Forest, Oregon, Missouri, United States

Greer Spring Big Ozark Spring
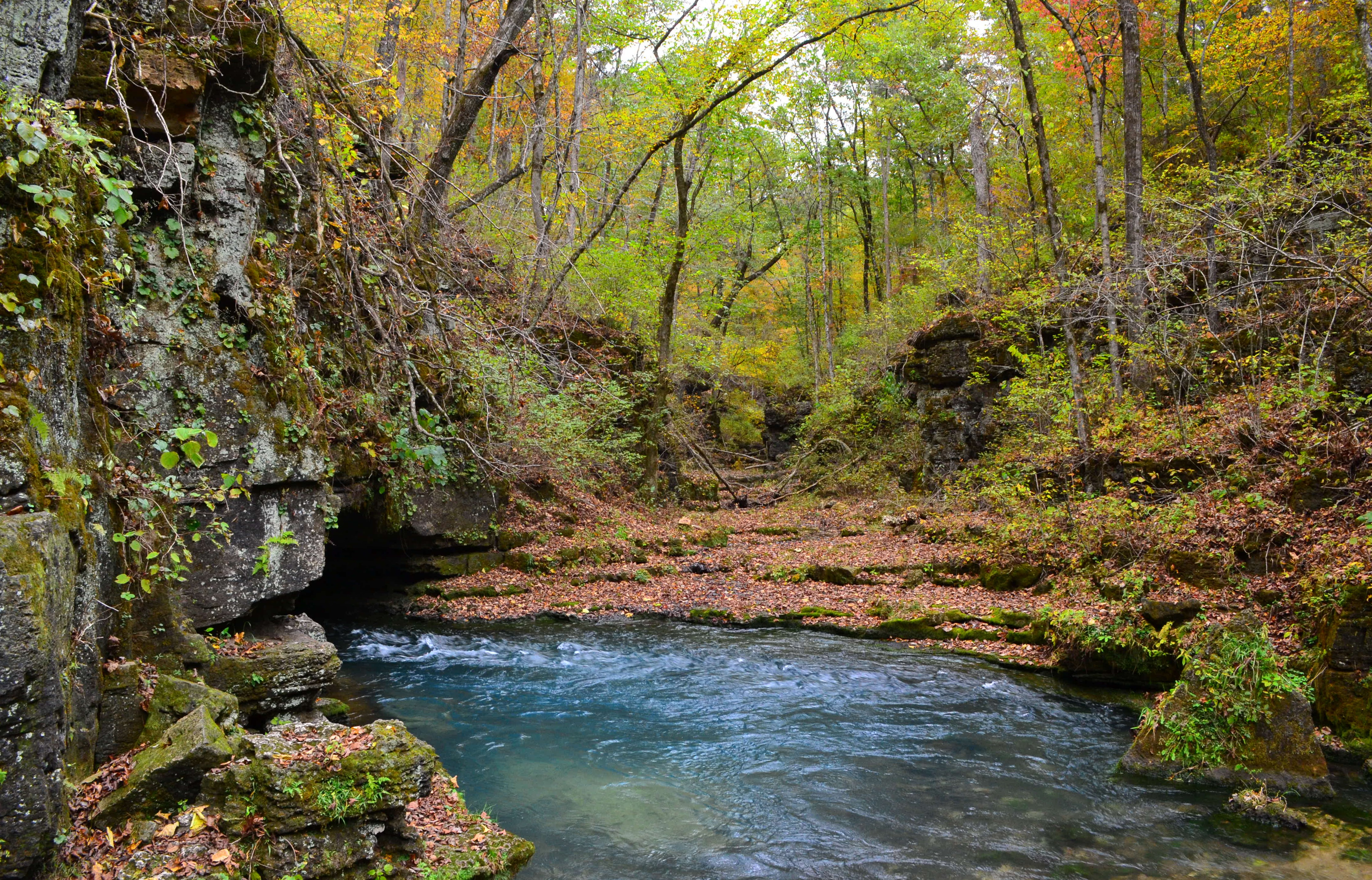

Location
- Country: United States
- State: Missouri
- Region: Ozark Plateau

Physical characteristics
- Source: Greer Spring Outlet
  - location: Eleven Point River basin, Salem Plateau, Ozark Plateau, Missouri
  - coordinates: 36°47′12″N 91°20′51″W
  - elevation: 564 ft (172 m)
- Mouth: Eleven Point River
  - location: Greer, Oregon County, Ozark Plateau, Missouri
  - elevation: 519 ft (158 m)USGS 7.5 min topo quad map
- Length: 1.4 mi (2.3 km)
- Discharge
  - location: Greer Spring1981-2009
  - average: 360 cu ft/s (10 m^{3}/s)1981-2009
  - maximum: 1,770 cu ft/s (50 m^{3}/s)

Basin features
- U.S. NNL: Designated: 1980

Greer Spring is a first magnitude spring located in the southeast portion of the Ozark Plateau, in Oregon County in south-central Missouri within the boundaries of the Mark Twain National Forest. The spring is the second largest spring in the Ozarks, with an average discharge of 360 cubic feet (10 m^{3}) of water per second. Greer Spring was designated a National Natural Landmark in 1980.

== The spring outlet ==
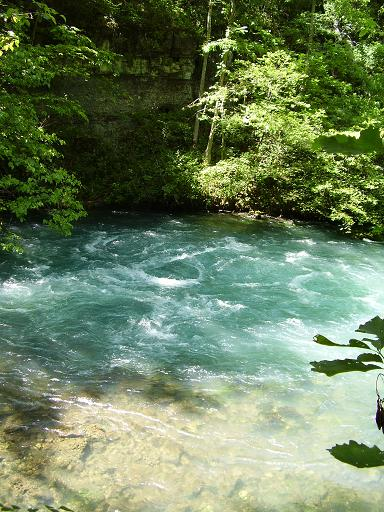
Greer Spring main outlet. Pictured here discharging 401 cu ft/s (11.4 m^{3}/s).

The spring emerges at the bottom of a narrow chasm. An upper outlet flowing from a cavern is only a fraction of Greer Spring's large flow. About 100 feet (30 m) downstream (north) the main outlet boils to the surface in a mixture of deep, aqua-blue water, moss covered rocks, and frothy whitewater. The newly formed surface stream then races down a small, steep, hardwood blanketed gorge dropping 65 feet (20 m) in elevation for 1.2 miles (1.9 km) to its confluence with the Eleven Point River. Greer Spring greatly increases the flow of the river, ensuring ample water for recreational activities, such as boating, even in the dry months. The vast amount of spring water changes the Eleven Point River into a coldwater stream for several miles downstream. The spring's cold water also creates ideal conditions for trout. The mouth of the spring branch is roughly 0.5 miles upstream (west) of the Missouri Route 19 bridge over the Eleven Point River. Greer Spring may be the most secluded and undisturbed big spring in the Ozarks. The spring has been owned by the U.S. National Forest Service since 1993. Before 1993 the spring was in the caring hands of private ownership. The area surrounding the spring has been retaken by nature, but had a small fish hatchery and roads many years ago, the site has remained very scenic and unspoiled.

Greer Spring branch roaring toward the Eleven Point River

== Access ==
The United States National Forest Service maintains a trail to the spring. The trailhead is located 18 miles (29 km) south of Winona and 8 miles (13 km) north of Alton on Missouri Highway 19 about 1.5 miles (2.4 km) south of the Highway 19 bridge that crosses the Eleven Point River and just north of the tiny town of Greer. A parking area on the side of Highway 19 provides parking for the trail. Visitors to the spring are common despite a mile-long hike.

== History ==
The first gristmill on the spring branch was built by Captain Samuel Greer in 1859. The spring was subsequently named after the Confederate captain. The mill was later destroyed during the American Civil War, however the mill was rebuilt. Sometime after 1883, the old mill was removed to make way for a new roller mill completed sometime before 1899. The mill changed ownership until 1922, when it ceased operation. Very few remains of mill operations exist today near the spring. The mill itself is still standing near the top of east side of the gorge, despite very little attention. As of 2016, work is well underway with help from the U.S. Forest Service and HistoriCorps for the mill restoration project. Difficult access, private ownership, and a remote location have all aided in protecting this karst location.

== See also ==
- List of Ozark springs
- Mark Twain National Forest
- Karst spring
