= Sinking Creek (Current River tributary) =

Stream in the U.S. state of Missouri

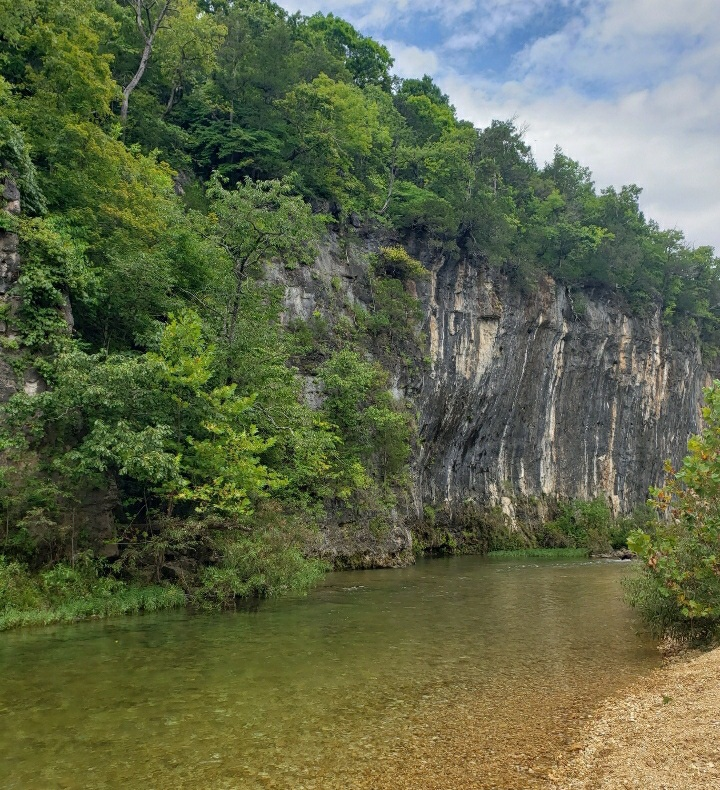
The clear waters of Sinking Creek, with the Echo Bluff in the background.

Sinking Creek is a stream in Dent, Reynolds and Shannon counties in the Ozarks of southeast Missouri. It is a tributary of the Current River.

The stream headwaters are at 37°31′04″N 91°18′38″W and the confluence with the Current is at 37°18′09″N 91°24′55″W.

The source area for the stream lies in western Reynolds County in the area just south of Missouri Route 72. The stream flows south through southeastern Dent County and passing under Missouri Route A and into northeast Shannon County. The stream meanders southwest roughly paralleling Route A then veering south-southwest to its confluence with the Current River just after passing under Missouri Route 19 north of Round Spring.

Sinking Creek is one of the main features of Echo Bluff State Park, established in 2016. Park visitors often swim, wade, and float in the cool waters and swimming holes of the stream. The park's namesake is the Echo Bluff, which towers over the creek.

Sinking Creek was named for the fact it is a losing stream along part of its course.

== See also ==
- List of rivers of Missouri
