= Eminence Township, Shannon County, Missouri =

Inactive township in the US state of Missouri

Coordinates: 37.1886°N 91.2994°W

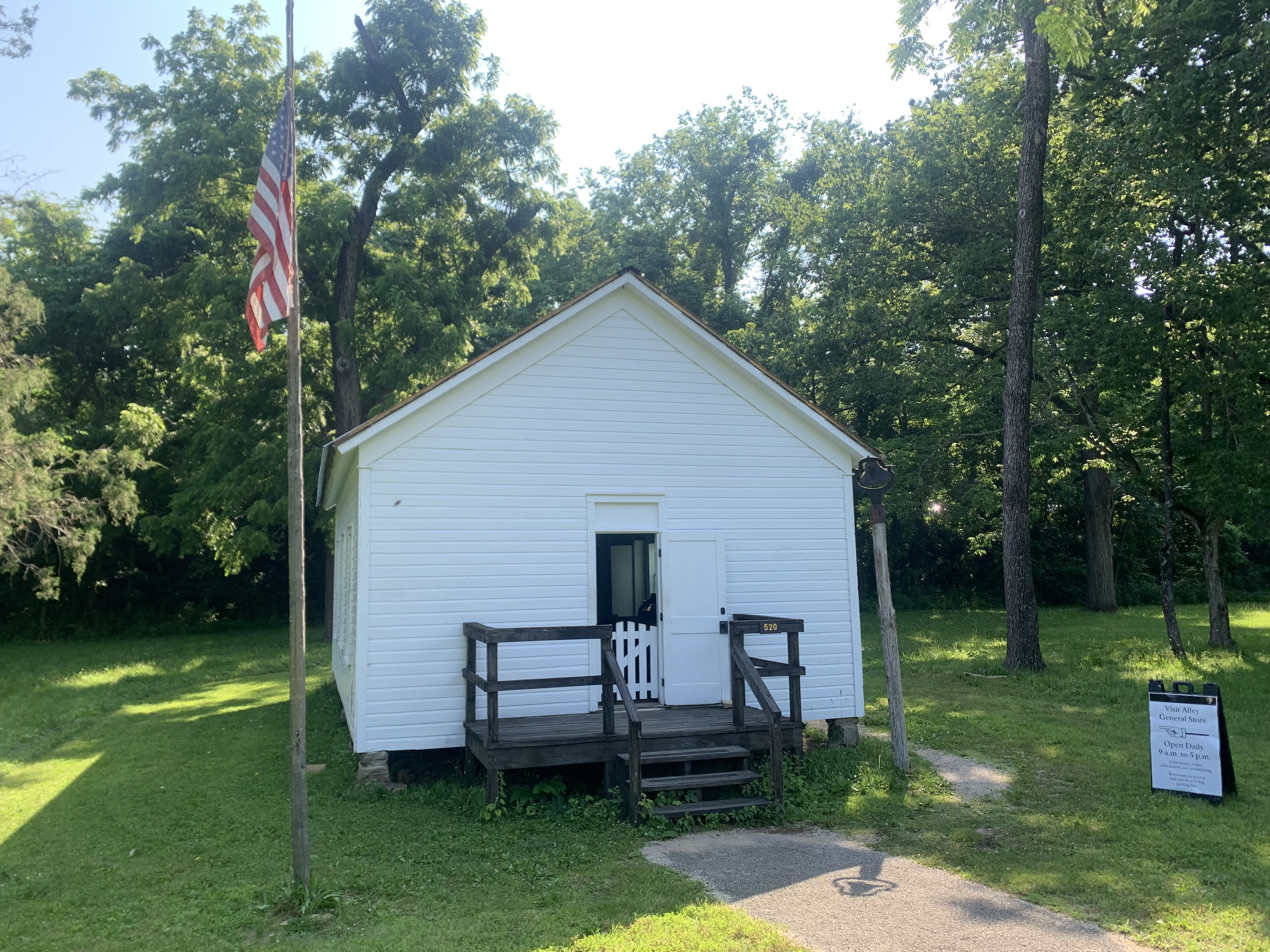
Story Schoolhouse near Alley Springs in Eminence Township.

Eminence Township is an inactive township in Shannon County, in the U.S. state of Missouri.

Eminence Township was erected in 1842, taking its name from the community of Eminence, Missouri.
