= Newton Township, Shannon County, Missouri =

Township in Missouri

Coordinates: 37.3469°N 91.4417°W

Newton Township is an inactive township in Shannon County, in the U.S. state of Missouri.

Newton Township was erected in 1842, and named after Joab Newton, a pioneer citizen.
