= Missouri Route 106 =

State highway in Missouri, U.S.

Route 106
- MO 106 highlighted in red

Route information
- Maintained by MoDOT
- Length: 46.298 mi (74.509 km)
- Existed: –present

Major junctions
- West end: Route 17 in Summersville
- East end: Route 21 at Ellington

Location
- Country: United States
- State: Missouri

Highway system
- Missouri State Highway System; Interstate; US; State; Supplemental
← Route 105	→ Route 107

Route 106 is a highway in the southern part of the US State of Missouri. Its eastern terminus is at Route 21 at Ellington; its western terminus is at Route 17 in Summersville. Route 106 runs through the eastern, mountainous Ozarks and through two sections of the Ozark National Scenic Riverways.

== Major intersections ==
County	Location	mi	km	Destinations	Notes
Texas	Summersville	0.000	0.000	Route 17	
Shannon	Eminence	19.321	31.094	Route 19	
Reynolds		41.944	67.502	Route 106 Spur south – Deer Run State Forest	
Reynolds	Ellington	46.298	74.509	Route 21	
1.000 mi = 1.609 km; 1.000 km = 0.621 mi

== Related route ==
Route 106 Spur
- Location: Deer Run State Forest
- Length: 1.359 mi (2.187 km)

Spur Route 106 connects the main highway with Deer Run State Forest.
