= Ozark National Scenic Riverways =

National recreational area in the Ozark, Missouri, USA

- IUCN category V (protected landscape/seascape)
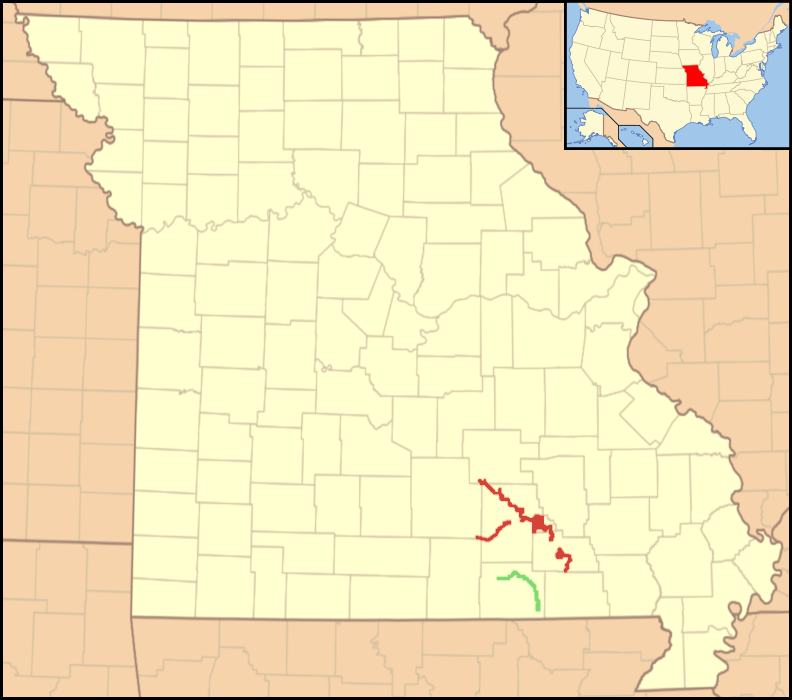
- The Ozark National Scenic Riverways (red) and the nearby Eleven Point National Wild and Scenic River (green)
- Location: Shannon, Carter, Dent, and Texas Counties, Missouri
- Nearest city: Salem, Van Buren, and Eminence
- Coordinates: 37.1907°N 91.2763°W
- Area: 80,000 acres (324 km^{2})
- Established: August 27, 1964; 62 years ago
- Visitors: 1,116,835 (in 2025)
- Governing body: National Park Service
- Website: Ozark National Scenic Riverways

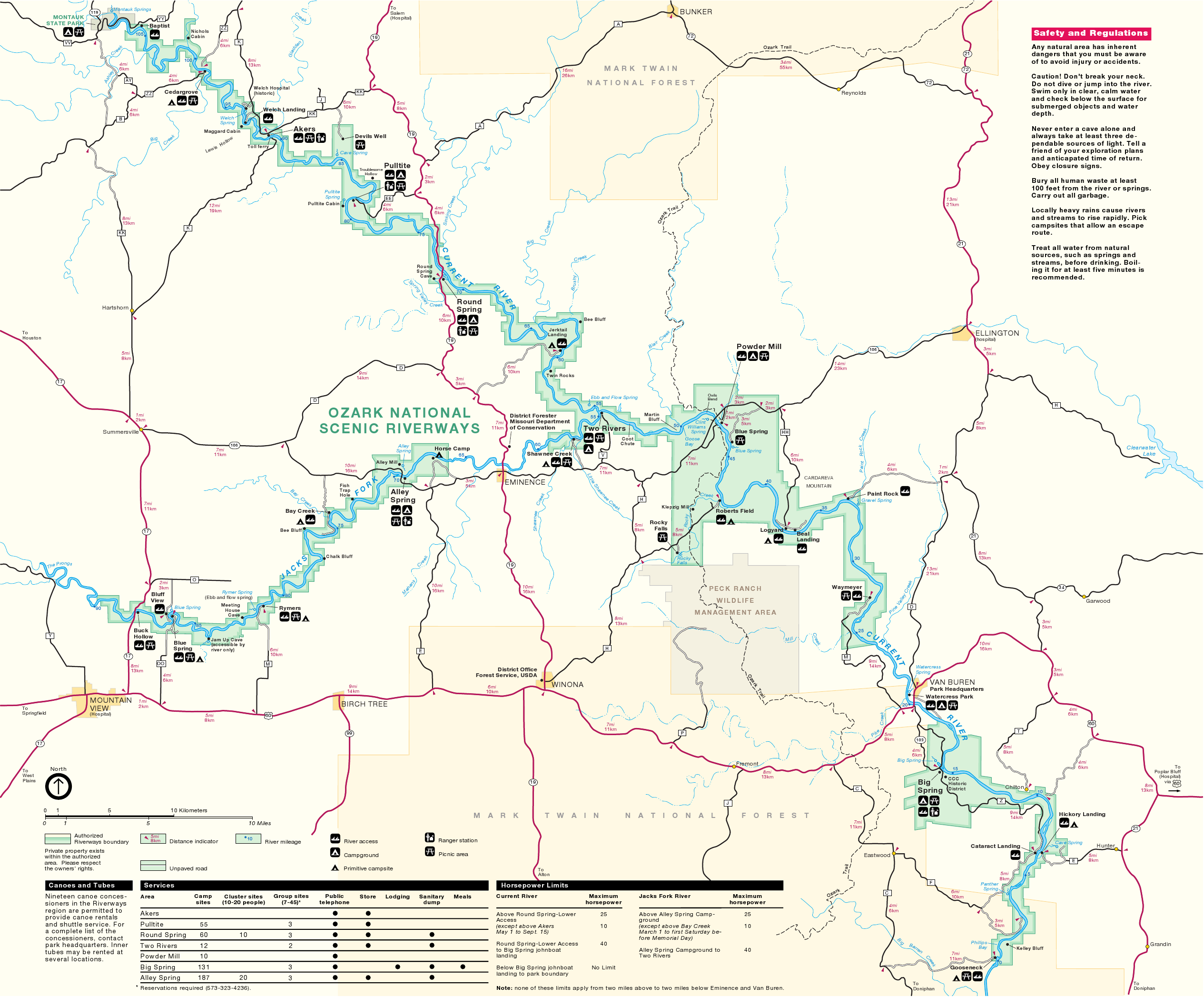
NPS map of the Riverways

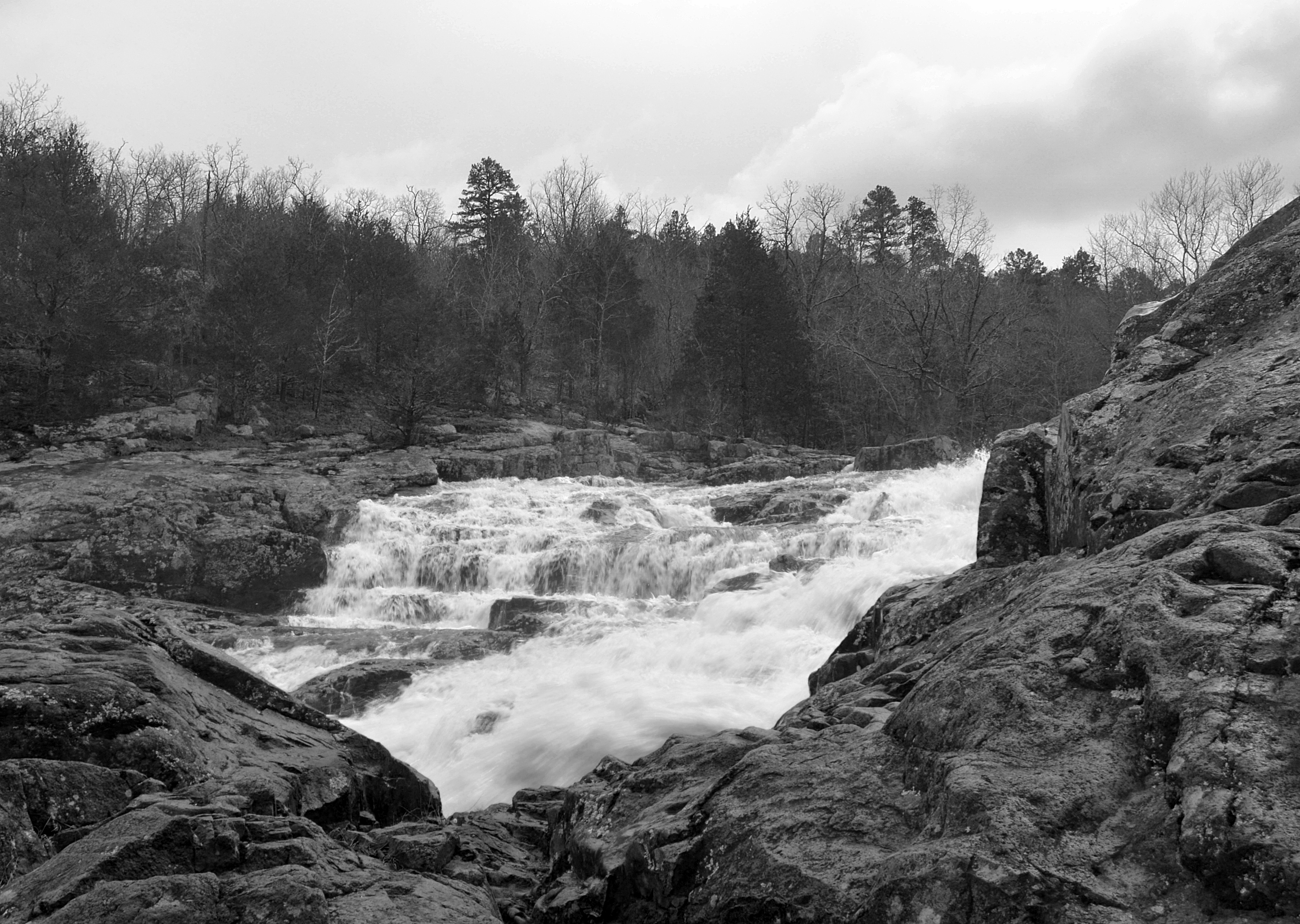
Rocky Falls on Rocky Creek, a tributary of the Current River

The Ozark National Scenic Riverways is a recreational unit of the National Park Service in the Ozarks of southern Missouri in the U.S.

The park was created by an Act of Congress in 1964 to protect the Current and Jacks Fork rivers, and it was formally dedicated in 1971. The park's 80,000 acres (324 km^{2}) are used for many forms of recreation and are home to abundant animal and plant species. 1.3 million recreational visits are estimated annually. Canoeing is one of the most popular activities. Kayaking and inflatable rafts and tubes add to the volume of river floaters. Motorized boating with jonboats is also a popular activity of locals and nearby Missourians. Other activities include horseback riding, hunting, hiking, fishing, camping, birdwatching, nature photography, and sightseeing.

The park service promotes the Current River as one of the midwest's best float streams, in part due to the contributions of some of the nation's largest springs. The headwaters of the Current River begin at the confluence of Pigeon Creek and Montauk Springs in Montauk State Park. Other notable springs along its course include Welch Spring, Cave Spring, Pulltite Spring, Round Spring, Fire Hydrant Spring, Ebb and Flow Spring, Blue Spring, Big Spring, and Gravel Spring. The park contains the United States' largest concentration of first magnitude springs (which are defined as having average flow of more than 100 cu ft/s (2.8 m^{3}/s)) in dolomite rock. The only comparable spring collections are the limestone springs of North Florida near Gainesville and the igneous-based springs of Idaho's Snake River.

== Description ==
The park includes many caves, including Round Spring Caverns, which offers ranger-led tours in the summer. Other notable caves include the Devils Well sink and Jam-Up Cave.

The park is traversed by the Ozark Trail, a popular long-distance hiking trail that passes Rocky Falls and crosses the Current River on Highway 106 at Powder Mill.

The park has resident feral horses and elk have been reintroduced on state lands nearby and are expected to eventually populate the park.

Historic sites include Alley Spring and Alley Spring Roller Mill, Buttin Rock School, Walter Klepzig Mill and Farm, Reed Log House, Welch Hospital and many CCC structures at Big Spring.

Facilities include campgrounds along the two rivers at Alley Spring, Round Spring, Pulltite, Two Rivers and Big Spring. There are also a number of less developed primitive campsites, and there are group sites at Akers, Round Spring, Alley and Pulltite. Park rangers present campfire programs and nature hikes at the bigger campgrounds during the summer. There are also traditional craft demonstrations and free bluegrass concerts.

The park is located mostly in Shannon County with parts extending into Carter, Dent, and Texas counties. Communities surrounding the Ozark National Scenic Riverways include Eminence, Licking, Salem, Van Buren, Ellington, Bunker, and Mountain View, Missouri. Administrative offices are located in Van Buren. The Big Spring Historic District in Carter County was listed on the National Register of Historic Places in 1981.

== History ==
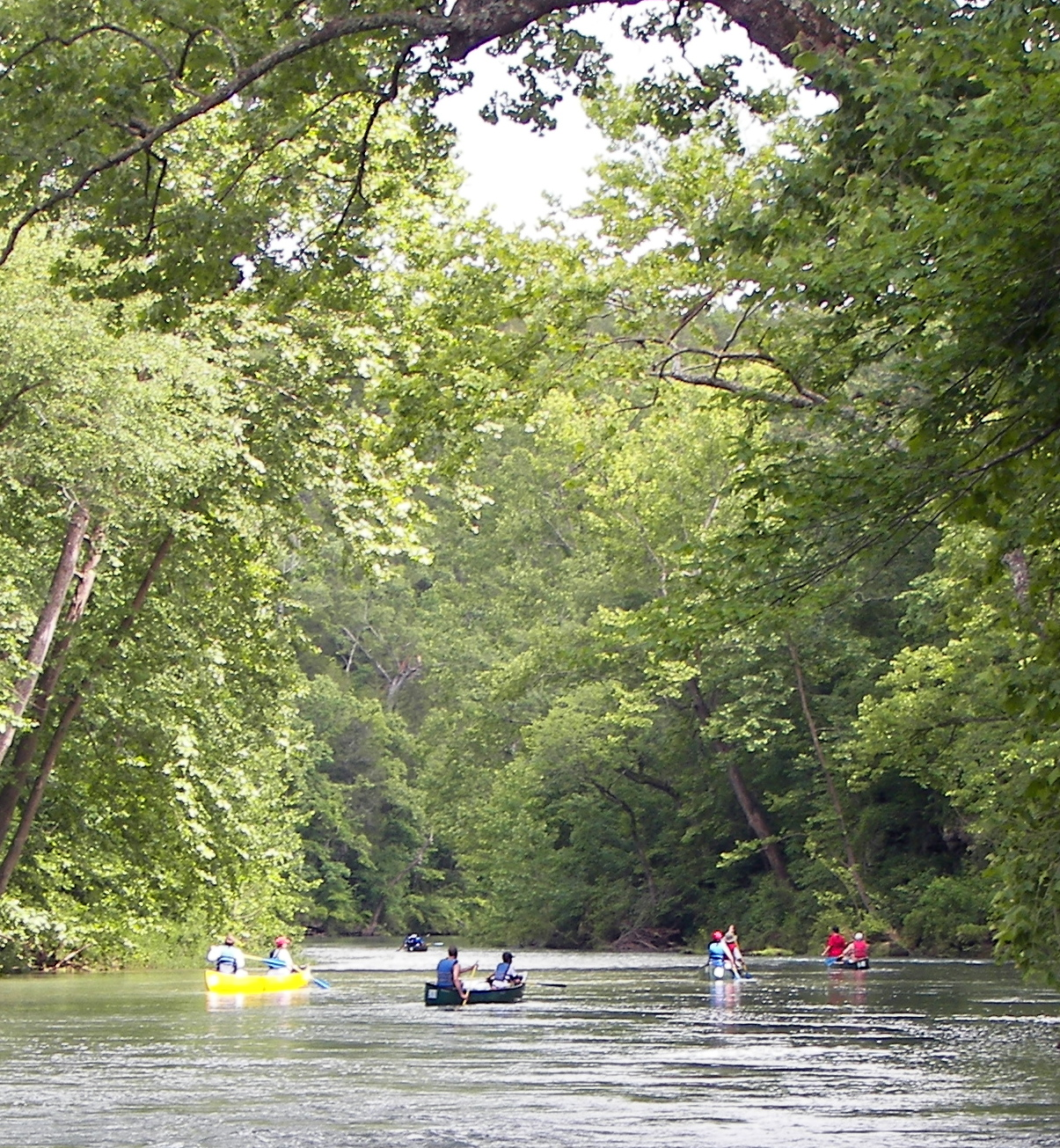
Canoers float the Current River below Welch Spring, which contributes on average 121 cubic feet (3.4 m^{3}) of water per second to the flow of the river.

Sarvis (2002, 2000) traces the controversy over the creation of the Ozark National Scenic Riverways (ONSR) in southeastern Missouri. Boasting clear rivers and spectacular landscape, the area saw a political contest for control of river recreational development between two federal agencies, the National Park Service (NPS) and the Forest Service. Local residents opposed NPS plans that included eminent domain acquisition of private property. Both agencies presented rival bills in Congress, and in 1964 the NPS plan was selected by Congress. In the long run the NPS has successfully accommodated and supervised OSNR recreation for two million visitors a year. By contrast, the Forest Service's nearby recreational activities have handled no more than 16,000 visitors yearly.

== America the Beautiful coin series ==
In 2017, the mill was featured in the U.S. Mint America the Beautiful Quarters series. The design is an image of Alley Mill that was created by Ron Sanders and sculpted by Renata Gordon.

== See also ==
- Eleven Point National Wild and Scenic River
- National Wild and Scenic Rivers System
