= Current River (Ozarks) =

River in Arkansas and Missouri, U.S.

Current
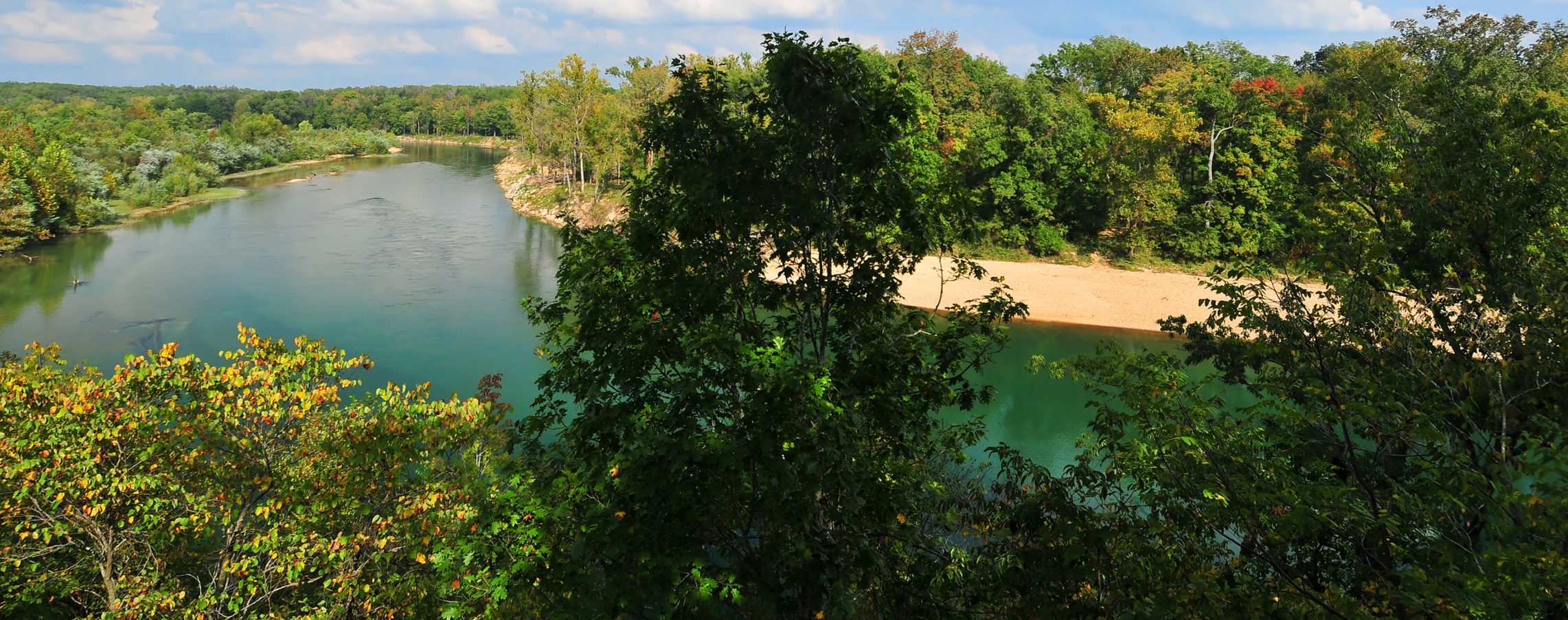
- Current River near Doniphan

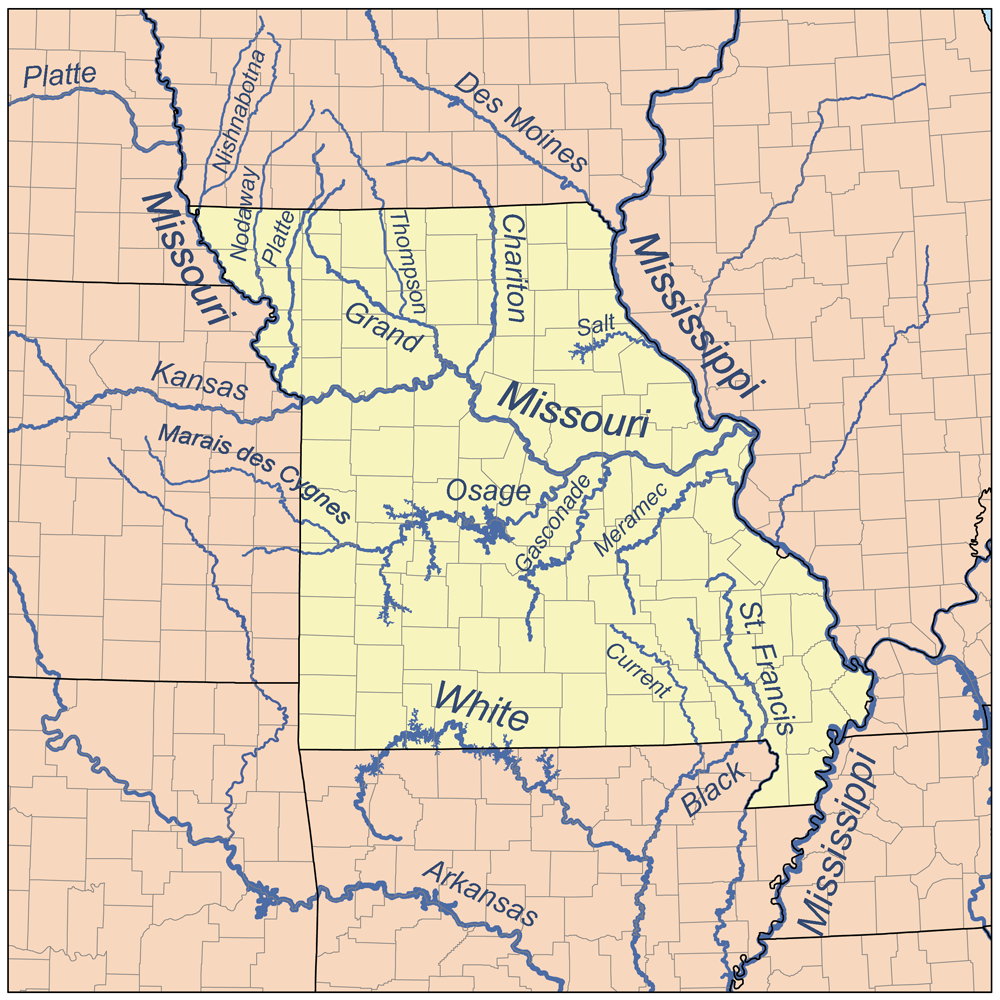
- Map of major Missouri Rivers

Location
- Country: United States
- State: Missouri, Arkansas
- Region: Ozark Plateau, Mississippi Alluvial Plain
- Cities: Van Buren, Doniphan, Missouri

Physical characteristics
- Source: Pigeon Creek; Montauk Spring
  - location: Montauk State Park, Dent County, Ozark Plateau, Missouri
  - coordinates: 37°27′36″N 91°41′00″W
  - elevation: 935 ft (285 m)
- Mouth: Black River
  - location: Pocahontas, Arkansas, Randolph County, Mississippi Alluvial Plain, Arkansas
  - coordinates: 36°15′11″N 90°54′45″W
  - elevation: 243 ft (74 m)
- Length: 184 mi (296 km)
- Basin size: 2,641 sq mi (6,840 km^{2})
- Discharge
  - location: Doniphan, Missouri
  - average: 2,772 cu ft/s (78.5 m^{3}/s)
  - maximum: 183,000 cu ft/s (5,200 m^{3}/s)

Basin features
- Tributaries
  - left: Sinking Creek, Little Black River, Welch Spring
  - right: Big Creek, Jacks Fork, Big Spring, Klenn Creek

The Current River forms in the southeastern portion of the Ozarks of Missouri and becomes a 7th order stream as it flows southeasterly out of the Ozarks into northeastern Arkansas where it becomes a tributary of the Black River, which is a tributary of the White River, a tributary of the Mississippi River. The Current River is roughly 184 miles (296 km) long and drains about 2,641 square miles (6,840 km^{2}) of land mostly in Missouri and a small portion of land in northeastern Arkansas. The headwaters of the Current River are nearly 900 feet (270 m) above sea level, while the mouth of the river lies around 280 feet (85 m) above sea level. The basin drains a rural area that is dominated by karst topography, underlain by dolomite and sandstone bedrock with a small area of igneous rock southeast of Eminence, Missouri. The annual daily mean discharge of the river near Doniphan, Missouri is 2,815 cubic feet (79.7 m^{3}) per second. In 1964, over 134 mi (160 km) of the upper course of the river and its tributaries were federally protected as the Ozark National Scenic Riverways, the first national park in America to protect a river system.

== Source and tributaries ==
The Current River begins in Montauk State Park located in the southwestern corner of Dent County in southeastern Missouri. The confluence of Pigeon Creek and Montauk Spring form the headwaters of the river. Montauk Spring makes up most of the consistent flow of the headwaters, providing ideal conditions for trout fishing. After leaving Montauk State Park, the river enters the Ozark National Scenic Riverways. The uppermost reaches of the river are swift with numerous riffles broken by deep pools of crystal clear water, further downstream the riffles continue, but get further apart. Hardwood trees, rock ledges, caves, springs, gravel bars, and towering dolomite bluffs line the riverbanks. Welch Spring, a first magnitude spring, enters the river approximately 14 miles (23 km) downstream from the headwaters, nearly doubling the flow of the river. Other notable springs to add to the river include Cave Spring, Pulltite Spring, and Round Spring. Downstream from the headwaters approximately 52 miles (84 km) the Current River receives its largest tributary the Jacks Fork from the west near the small town of Eminence, Missouri. Blue Spring, another first magnitude spring, empties into the river, 9 miles (14 km) downstream from the confluence with the Jacks Fork.

The Current River is approximately 86 miles (138 km) long when it passes by the town of Van Buren and under U.S. Route 60. South of Van Buren a few miles the Current River receives its second biggest tributary, the largest spring in the Ozarks and one of the largest single spring outlets known in the world. Big Spring empties into the river providing nearly 470 cubic feet (13 m^{3}) of water per second. From Big Spring the river continues southeasterly leaving the Ozark National Scenic Riverways 105 miles (169 km) from the headwaters. The river then flows through Mark Twain National Forest until reaching Doniphan, Missouri and passes under U.S. Route 160. From here the river slows as it exits the Ozark Highlands, the river continues its slow silt laden path into Arkansas where it receives the Little Black River from the northeast before it joins the Black River near Pocahontas, Arkansas.

== Recreational activities ==
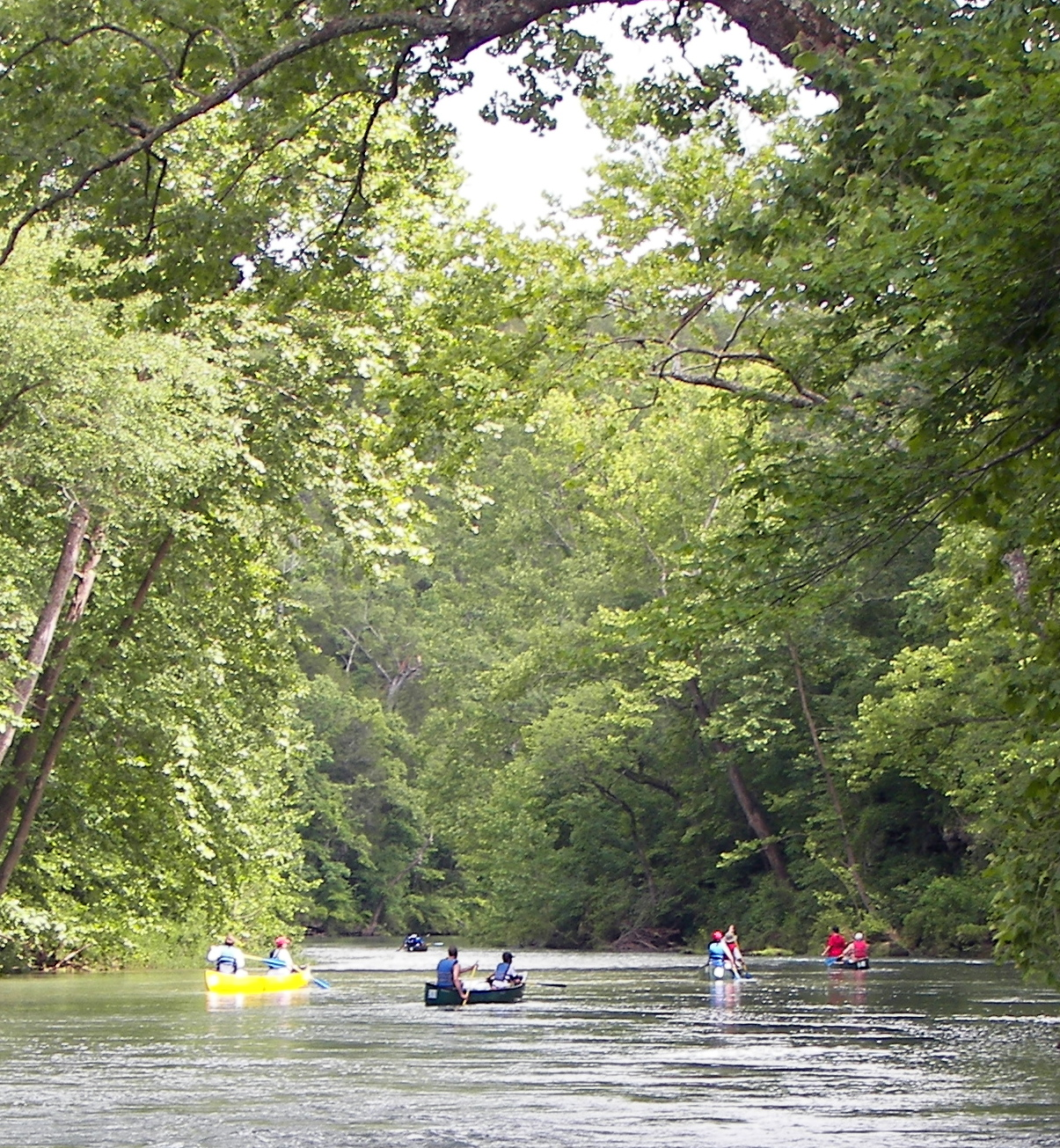
Canoers on the swift, clear upper Current below Welch Spring

Canoeing, fishing, horseback riding, and camping are popular activities along the Current River. The river is fairly gentle and is considered to have mostly class 1 rapids and a few rated class 2.

Some of the points of interest along the course of the river include Montauk State Park, Welch Spring and its abandoned tuberculosis hospital, Aker's Ferry, Cave Spring, Devil's Well, Deer Leap, Rock House Cave, Pulltite Spring, Round Spring, Jacks Fork, Blue Spring, Rocky Falls (on a small tributary), and Big Spring.

== See also ==
- List of Missouri rivers
- List of Arkansas rivers
- List of Ozark springs
