= Ink (disambiguation) =

Ink is a liquid containing pigments or dyes used for drawing, writing or printing.

Ink or INK may also refer to:

== Places ==
- Ink, Arkansas, United States
- Ink, Missouri, United States

== Arts, entertainment, and media ==
=== Fictional characters ===
- Ink (comics), a character in the Marvel universe
- Ink, a character in the study guide series Moetan
- Ink, the only female character and a drummer in Happy Monster Band

=== Literature ===
- Ink (novel), the second novel by Hal Duncan
- Ink (play), a play about the history of Rupert Murdoch's newspaper The Sun -- see Muriel McKay

=== Music ===
- Ink (musician), American singer-songwriter and guitarist
- Ink, a music group formed by members of Jerk
- Ice Nine Kills, or "INK", an American metalcore band
- Ink (The Fixx album), 1991
- "Ink" (song), a Coldplay song
- "Ink", a song by the American post-hardcore band Finch from the album Say Hello to Sunshine

=== Television ===
- Ink (TV series), an American sitcom starring real-life husband and wife Ted Danson and Mary Steenburgen as newspaper journalists
- I.N.K. Invisible Network of Kids, an animated children's show
- "Ink" (Heroes), a 2009 episode of the TV series Heroes

=== Other arts, entertainment, and media ===
- Ink (2009 film), a fantasy movie
- Ink (2026 film), a biographical drama film

== Brands and enterprises ==
- Ink (company), a travel media company
- Ink, a line of Chase Bank credit cards, such as Ink Business Plus and Ink Business Cash

== Slang ==
- Article (publishing), in journalism, generating "ink" is slang for writing and publishing articles
- Tattoo, "ink" is slang for one or more tattoos

== Transportation ==
- INK, the National Rail station code for Inverkeithing railway station, Fife, Scotland

== Other uses ==
- INK (operating system), a Linux-derivative operating system
- Cephalopod ink, a secretion of cephalopods such as octopus, squid and cuttlefish

== See also ==
- Inkwell (software), handwriting and gesture recognition software by Apple
- Inky (disambiguation)
- Inked (disambiguation)
- Inque, a character from the animated show Batman Beyond
