= Jam Up Hollow =

Valley in Missouri, United States

Jam Up Hollow is a valley in Shannon County in the U.S. state of Missouri. The intermittent stream of the valley is a small west flowing tributary of Pine Hollow about four miles southeast of Delaware on Mahans Creek. The source area for the hollow stream is at 37°04′29″N 91°28′19″W and the confluence with Pine Hollow is at 37°04′59″N 91°26′12″W.

Jam Up Hollow was so named on account of its uneven and narrow terrain.
