= Spring Valley Creek (Current River tributary) =

Stream in the U.S. state of Missouri

Spring Valley Creek is a stream in Texas and Shannon counties of the Ozarks of southern Missouri. The stream is a tributary of the Current River.

The stream headwaters arise in southeast Texas County at 37°11′37″N 91°45′38″W. The stream flows to the east-southeast passing into Shannon County south of Summersville. The stream passes under Missouri Routes 17 and 106 and turns to the northeast. The stream passes through several sharp and deeply incised meanders in the area around the community of Ink before reaching its confluence with the Current River at Round Spring at 37°16′49″N 91°24′16″W.

The stream and the valley, through which it flows, were given the name for the many springs it contains.
