= Crime Club =

Crime Club may refer to:

- Collins Crime Club (UK publishing imprint), British book marque for crime and mystery fiction from publisher Collins
- Doubleday Crime Club (US publishing imprint), American book marque for crime and mystery fiction from publisher Doubleday
- The Crime Club (radio series), U.S. radio program based on stories from the Doubleday Crime Club
- The Crime Club (film series), Universal Pictures film series based on stories from the Doubleday Crime Club
- MIT Crime Club (student club), student group at the Massachusetts Institute of Technology for promoting technology to help solve crime

== See also ==
- Outlaw motorcycle club, criminal gang based around motorcycle riding members
- Criminal gang (disambiguation)
- Our Society, founded by Arthur Conan Doyle as "The Crimes Club"
