= Gangster (disambiguation) =

A gangster is a member of a gang (often an organized crime syndicate).

Gangster or gangsters may also refer to:

== Arts, entertainment, and media ==
=== Films and television ===
- Miracles (1989 film), a Hong Kong film released in the Philippines as Gangster
- Gangster (1994 film), a Hindi-language Indian film
- Gangster: A Love Story, a 2006 Hindi-language Indian film
- Gangster, also known as The Wee Man, a 2013 Scottish film
- Gangster (2014 film), a Malayalam-language Indian film
- Gangster (2016 film), a Bengali-language Indian film
- Gangsters (1992 film), a 1992 Italian film
- The Gangster (1947 film), a film noir starring Barry Sullivan
- The Gangster (1965 film), a Mexican film
- The Gangster (2012 film), a Thai drama action film
- The Gangsters, a 1913 film starring Roscoe "Fatty" Arbuckle
- Gangster (film series), a 1998 Bollywood crime thriller film series
- Gangsters (TV series), a 1970s BBC show
- "Gangster" (Not Going Out), a 2007 television episode
- Mumbhaii - The Gangster, a 2015 Hindi-language Indian film

=== Games ===
- Gangster!, 1979 role-playing game published by Fantasy Games Unlimited
- Gangsters (board game), published in 1992 by Avalon Hill
- Gangsters: Organized Crime, computer game by Eidos Interactive

=== Literature ===
- Gangster (novel), a 2001 novel by Lorenzo Carcaterra
- Gangsters (novel), a 2005 novel by Klas Östergren
- The Gangster (novel), a 2016 novel by Clive Cussler

=== Music ===
- "Gangsters" (song), 1979 UK top ten-single by The Specials
- "Gangsters", a song by rapper Wiley from Playtime Is Over
- "Gangster", a 2008 song by Ima Robot

== Other uses ==
- El Gangster, nickname of Puerto Rican celebrity Antonio Sánchez
- Gin Gangster, a South Korean paraglider by Gin Gliders

== See also ==
- Gang (disambiguation)
- Gangsta (disambiguation)
