= Big Creek (Current River East) =

Tributary of the Current River

Coordinates: 37°14′54″N 91°19′35″W

Big Creek is a stream in Shannon, Reynolds and Dent counties in the Ozarks of southern Missouri. It is a tributary of the Current River.

The headwaters are in Dent County (at ) within the southwest quadrant of Bunker. The stream flows south and east to enter Reynolds County about one-half mile from its source. The stream continues south through the southwest corner of Reynolds County and enters Shannon County about 2.5 miles south of its origin. The stream flows southwest past the communities of Rat and Mauser Mill and enters the Current River (at ) midway between Round Spring and the Two Rivers campground.

The stream was named for its large size.
