= Montier =

Montier may refer to:

== Places ==
=== United States ===
- Montier, Missouri, a census-designated place in southwestern Shannon County
- Montier Township, Shannon County, Missouri

=== France ===
- Montier-en-Der, a former commune in the Haute-Marne department in north-eastern France
  - Montier-en-Der Abbey, a former Benedictine, later Cluniac, abbey, dissolved during the French Revolution
- Montier-en-l'Isle, a commune in the Aube department in north-central France
- Montiers, a commune in the Oise department in northern France
- Montiers-sur-Saulx, a commune in the Meuse department in Grand Est in north-eastern France
- Forest-Montiers, a commune in the Somme department in Hauts-de-France in northern France

== People ==
- Charles Montier, a French racing driver and automotive engineer
- Ferdinand Montier, a French racing driver, son of Charles
- Neil Montier, a London-born photographer and digital artist

== Other ==
- Montier & Gillet, a French automobile manufactured only in 1897
