= Mahans Creek =

Stream in the US state of Missouri

Mahans Creek is a stream in southeastern Shannon County in the Ozarks of southern Missouri. It is a tributary of Jacks Fork.

The stream headwaters are at 37°01′58″N 91°24′27″W and the confluence with the Jacks Fork is at 37°09′10″N 91°22′32″W. The stream source area is northwest of Winona and it flows north along Missouri Route E past the community of Delaware. It then turns to the northeast and passes under Missouri Route 106 and joins the Jacks Fork just northwest of Eminence.

A variant name was "Manans Creek". Also spelled "Mahon Creek", the creek has the name of the local Mahon family.

== See also ==
- List of rivers of Missouri
