= Gangsta Rap =

Gangsta Rap may refer to:

- Gangsta rap, a style of hip hop music
- Gangsta Rap (album), by Ice-T, 2006
- "Gangsta Rap", a 1999 single by Ill Bill
- Gangsta Rap, a 2004 novel by Benjamin Zephaniah

== See also ==
- Gangsta (disambiguation)
