= Devils Well Hollow =

Valley in Missouri, United States

Coordinates: 37.3722677°N 91.4873637°W

Devils Well Hollow is a valley in Shannon County in the U.S. state of Missouri.

Devils Well Hollow was so named on account of a deep hole in the valley from which spring water could be obtained.
