= Immaculate Misconception =

Immaculate Misconception is a word play on Immaculate Conception. It may refer to:

- "Immaculate Misconception", a song by Motionless in White
- "Immaculate Misconception", a song by Emmure
- "Immaculate Misconception", a song by Cathedral
- "Immaculate Misconception", an episode of the police drama program, Blue Heelers
- "The Immaculate Misconception", a song by Antimatter
- The Immaculate Misconception, a film starring Joseph Perrino
- An Immaculate Misconception: Sex in an Age of Mechanical Reproduction, a drama by Carl Djerassi
