= Enoch Moore =

Enoch Moore may refer to:

- Inky Moore (1925–2000), conservation advocate
- Enoch Moore (Loyalist turned rebel) (1779–1841)
- Enoch Moore (politician), 19th century Illinois state representative
