= Paradise City (disambiguation) =

"Paradise City" is the name of a 1988 Guns N' Roses single and the video for it. Paradise City may also refer to:

== Places ==
=== Real ===
- A nickname for Northampton, Massachusetts
- Paradise City station, a railway station in Incheon, South Korea

=== Fictional ===
- Paradise City, used by James Hadley Chase in many of his novels
- Paradise City, the setting for the video game Burnout Paradise
- Paradise City, on the planet Nimbus III in Star Trek V: The Final Frontier.

== Media ==
- Paradise City (2021 TV series), an American TV series released by Prime Video
- Paradise City (novel), by Lorenzo Carcaterra, published in 2004
- "Paradise City", a 1998 song by N-Trance
- Degrassi Goes Hollywood, also known as Paradise City: Degrassi Goes Hollywood, a 2009 Canadian television movie
- Paradise City (film), an American action film starring Bruce Willis and John Travolta
- À Paradis City, a 2015 album by Jean Leloup

== See also ==
- Paradise (disambiguation)
