= Oakside, Missouri =

Unincorporated community in Missouri, U.S.

Coordinates: 37°06′26″N 91°39′09″W

Oakside is an unincorporated community in western Shannon County, in the U.S. state of Missouri.

The community lies on a county road approximately 700 feet from the Shannon-Texas county line and one-quarter mile east of Missouri Route 17. It is located approximately five miles south of Summersville and 7.5 miles north of Mountain View.

== History ==
A post office called Oakside was established in 1890, and remained in operation until 1943. The community was named for a grove of oak trees near the original town site.
