= Open Hollow =

Valley in Missouri, United States

Coordinates: 37.096717°N 91.401803°W

Open Hollow is a valley in Shannon County in the U.S. state of Missouri.

Open Hollow was named for the fact it is relatively wide.
