= Teresita, Missouri =

Teresita
- Unincorporated community
- Location within the state of Missouri
- Coordinates: 36°59′5″N 91°37′43″W
- Country: United States
- State: Missouri
- County: Shannon
- Township: Montier
- Elevation: 1,150 ft (350 m)
- Time zone: UTC-6 (Central (CST))
  - Summer (DST): UTC-5 (CDT)
- GNIS feature ID: 741316

Teresita is an unincorporated community in western Shannon County, Missouri, United States. It is located just off U.S. Route 60, approximately six miles east of Mountain View.

A post office called Teresita was established in 1903, and remained in operation until 1990. It is unknown why the Spanish name "Teresita" was applied to this community.
