= 2000 United States presidential election in Missouri =

- November 7, 2000
- Turnout: 61.20%

Nominee	George W. Bush	Al Gore
Party	Republican	Democratic
Home state	Texas	Tennessee
Running mate	Dick Cheney	Joe Lieberman
Electoral vote	11	0
Popular vote	1,189,924	1,111,138
Percentage	50.42%	47.08%

Bush
40–50%
50–60%
60–70%
70–80%
Gore
40–50%
50–60%
60–70%
70–80%
President before election
Bill Clinton
Democratic
Elected President
George W. Bush
Republican

The 2000 United States presidential election in Missouri took place on November 7, 2000, as part of the 2000 United States presidential election. Voters chose eleven electors to the Electoral College, who voted for president and vice president.

Prior to the election, Missouri was widely considered to be a critical swing state. Governor of Texas George W. Bush ultimately won the state by a margin of just over 3% against his Democratic opponent, Vice President Al Gore. The 2000 election was seen as a turning point for Missouri's bellwether status; the state was notable for voting for the overall winner of the presidency throughout most of the 20th Century. Missouri ultimately proved decisive, as Gore would have won the presidency with 278 electoral votes had he won the state, regardless of the outcome in Florida. Reportedly, Missouri Representative Dick Gephardt was on Gore's "short list" of potential running mates.

Although Bush did win the presidency, thus keeping the state's bellwether streak active, this was the first election since Missouri voted for Adlai Stevenson in 1956 where the state failed to back the national popular vote winner, and only the second time since 1900. This was also the first time in history that a Democrat won the popular vote without carrying Missouri. Missouri would ultimately lose its bellwether status in 2008 by narrowly voting for John McCain, and has been safely Republican in presidential elections since 2012.

As of the 2024 presidential election, this is the last time that Saline, New Madrid, Pemiscot, Mississippi, Ray, and Clay Counties (which Gore won by only one vote) have voted for the Democratic presidential candidate. Bush became the first Republican to win the White House without carrying St. Louis County since Rutherford B. Hayes in 1876.

Missouri was one of nine states won by Bush that had supported Bill Clinton in both 1992 and 1996.

== General election ==
=== Polling ===
Poll source	Date(s)	Sample size	Margin of error	George W. Bush (R)	Al Gore (D)	Ralph Nader (G)	Other / undecided (Note: Calculated by taking the difference of 100% and all other listed candidates combined. For polls that do not report a figure for Nader, this includes his support.)
Zogby Analytics	November 5, 2000	597	—	48%	47%	3%	2%
American Research Group	November 3, 2000	600	—	45%	46%	4%	5%
Harris Insights & Analytics	November 3, 2000	5,833	—	49%	46%	2%	3%
Zogby Analytics	November 2, 2000	600	—	47%	45%	4%	4%
Research 2000	November 1, 2000	600	—	45%	45%	4%	6%
Zogby Analytics	October 30, 2000	600	—	46%	43%	4%	7%
Rasmussen Reports	October 29, 2000	1,243	—	47%	42%	—	11%
Zogby Analytics	October 27, 2000	600	—	47%	45%	3%	5%
Zogby Analytics	October 25, 2000	603	—	44%	46%	4%	6%
Mason-Dixon Polling & Strategy	October 24, 2000	625	—	45%	44%	4%	7%
Rasmussen Reports	October 23, 2000	1,072	—	46%	42%	—	12%

=== Results ===
2000 United States presidential election in Missouri
Party	Candidate	Running mate	Popular vote		Electoral vote		Swing
Party	Candidate	Running mate	Count	%	Count	%	Swing
Republican	George W. Bush of Texas	Dick Cheney of Wyoming	1,189,924	50.42%	11	100.00%	▲9.18%
Democratic	Al Gore of Tennessee	Joe Lieberman of Connecticut	1,111,138	47.08%	0	0.00%	▼0.46%
Green	Ralph Nader of Connecticut	Winona LaDuke of Minnesota	38,515	1.63%	0	0.00%	▲1.63%
Reform	Pat Buchanan of Virginia	Ezola B. Foster of California	9,818	0.42%	0	0.00%	▼9.64%
Libertarian	Harry Browne of Tennessee	Art Olivier of California	7,436	0.32%	0	0.00%	▼0.17%
Total			2,359,892	100.00%	11	100.00%	

==== By county ====
County	George W. Bush Republican		Al Gore Democratic		Various candidates Other parties		Margin		Total
County	#	%	#	%	#	%	#	%	Total
Adair	6,050	57.34%	4,101	38.86%	401	3.80%	1,949	18.48%	10,552
Andrew	4,257	58.52%	2,795	38.42%	222	3.05%	1,462	20.10%	7,274
Atchison	1,798	62.63%	1,013	35.28%	60	2.09%	785	27.35%	2,871
Audrain	5,256	52.64%	4,551	45.58%	178	1.78%	705	7.06%	9,985
Barry	7,885	63.75%	4,135	33.43%	348	2.81%	3,750	30.32%	12,368
Barton	3,836	71.49%	1,424	26.54%	106	1.98%	2,412	44.95%	5,366
Bates	4,245	54.48%	3,386	43.45%	161	2.07%	859	11.03%	7,792
Benton	4,218	55.99%	3,150	41.81%	166	2.20%	1,068	14.18%	7,534
Bollinger	3,487	65.87%	1,692	31.96%	115	2.17%	1,795	33.91%	5,294
Boone	28,426	47.69%	28,811	48.33%	2,372	3.98%	-385	-0.64%	59,609
Buchanan	16,423	47.26%	17,085	49.16%	1,243	3.58%	-662	-1.90%	34,751
Butler	9,111	63.28%	4,996	34.70%	290	2.01%	4,115	28.58%	14,397
Caldwell	2,220	57.66%	1,488	38.65%	142	3.69%	732	19.01%	3,850
Callaway	8,238	53.81%	6,708	43.82%	362	2.36%	1,530	9.99%	15,308
Camden	10,358	60.58%	6,323	36.98%	418	2.44%	4,035	23.60%	17,099
Cape Girardeau	19,832	66.42%	9,334	31.26%	693	2.32%	10,498	35.16%	29,859
Carroll	2,880	62.87%	1,620	35.36%	81	1.77%	1,260	27.51%	4,581
Carter	1,730	61.61%	997	35.51%	81	2.88%	733	26.10%	2,808
Cass	20,113	56.07%	14,921	41.60%	835	2.33%	5,192	14.47%	35,869
Cedar	3,530	62.33%	1,979	34.95%	154	2.72%	1,551	27.38%	5,663
Chariton	2,300	55.37%	1,792	43.14%	62	1.49%	508	12.23%	4,154
Christian	14,824	63.82%	7,896	33.99%	508	2.19%	6,928	29.83%	23,228
Clark	1,899	49.95%	1,812	47.66%	91	2.39%	87	2.29%	3,802
Clay	39,083	48.75%	39,084	48.75%	2,006	2.50%	-1	-0.00%	80,173
Clinton	4,323	50.67%	3,994	46.82%	214	2.51%	329	3.85%	8,531
Cole	20,167	61.53%	12,056	36.78%	552	1.68%	8,111	24.75%	32,775
Cooper	4,072	59.97%	2,567	37.81%	151	2.22%	1,505	22.16%	6,790
Crawford	4,754	57.26%	3,350	40.35%	198	2.38%	1,404	16.91%	8,302
Dade	2,468	65.78%	1,193	31.80%	91	2.43%	1,275	33.98%	3,752
Dallas	3,723	59.86%	2,311	37.16%	185	2.97%	1,412	22.70%	6,219
Daviess	2,011	57.56%	1,367	39.12%	116	3.32%	644	18.44%	3,494
DeKalb	2,363	58.36%	1,562	38.58%	124	3.06%	801	19.78%	4,049
Dent	3,996	66.73%	1,839	30.71%	153	2.56%	2,157	36.02%	5,988
Douglas	3,599	68.15%	1,546	29.27%	136	2.58%	2,053	38.88%	5,281
Dunklin	5,426	51.55%	4,947	47.00%	152	1.44%	479	4.55%	10,525
Franklin	21,863	55.78%	16,172	41.26%	1,159	2.96%	5,691	14.52%	39,194
Gasconade	4,190	63.21%	2,257	34.05%	182	2.75%	1,933	29.16%	6,629
Gentry	1,771	57.04%	1,271	40.93%	63	2.03%	500	16.11%	3,105
Greene	59,178	57.50%	41,091	39.92%	2,657	2.58%	18,087	17.58%	102,926
Grundy	2,976	63.21%	1,563	33.20%	169	3.59%	1,413	30.01%	4,708
Harrison	2,552	63.94%	1,328	33.27%	111	2.78%	1,224	30.67%	3,991
Henry	5,120	52.36%	4,459	45.60%	199	2.04%	661	6.76%	9,778
Hickory	2,172	51.25%	1,961	46.27%	105	2.48%	211	4.98%	4,238
Holt	1,738	65.29%	871	32.72%	53	1.99%	867	32.57%	2,662
Howard	2,414	53.50%	1,944	43.09%	154	3.41%	470	10.41%	4,512
Howell	9,018	64.07%	4,641	32.97%	416	2.96%	4,377	31.10%	14,075
Iron	2,237	50.68%	2,044	46.31%	133	3.01%	193	4.37%	4,414
Jackson	104,418	38.38%	160,419	58.96%	7,225	2.66%	-56,001	-20.58%	272,062
Jasper	24,899	66.43%	11,737	31.31%	845	2.25%	13,162	35.12%	37,481
Jefferson	36,766	47.62%	38,616	50.02%	1,822	2.36%	-1,850	-2.40%	77,204
Johnson	9,339	55.63%	6,926	41.26%	522	3.11%	2,413	14.37%	16,787
Knox	1,226	59.66%	787	38.30%	42	2.04%	439	21.36%	2,055
Laclede	8,556	65.58%	4,183	32.06%	307	2.35%	4,373	33.52%	13,046
Lafayette	7,849	54.06%	6,343	43.68%	328	2.26%	1,506	10.38%	14,520
Lawrence	8,305	64.36%	4,235	32.82%	363	2.81%	4,070	31.54%	12,903
Lewis	2,388	53.26%	2,023	45.12%	73	1.63%	365	8.14%	4,484
Lincoln	8,549	53.72%	6,961	43.74%	403	2.53%	1,588	9.98%	15,913
Linn	3,246	54.01%	2,646	44.03%	118	1.96%	600	9.98%	6,010
Livingston	3,709	59.10%	2,425	38.64%	142	2.26%	1,284	20.46%	6,276
Macon	4,232	58.98%	2,817	39.26%	126	1.76%	1,415	19.72%	7,175
Madison	2,460	56.25%	1,828	41.80%	85	1.94%	632	14.45%	4,373
Maries	2,216	57.50%	1,554	40.32%	84	2.18%	662	17.18%	3,854
Marion	6,550	55.93%	4,993	42.63%	169	1.44%	1,557	13.30%	11,712
McDonald	4,460	68.31%	1,866	28.58%	203	3.11%	2,594	39.73%	6,529
Mercer	1,250	67.86%	555	30.13%	37	2.01%	695	37.73%	1,842
Miller	5,945	63.54%	3,217	34.38%	194	2.07%	2,728	29.16%	9,356
Mississippi	2,395	45.93%	2,756	52.85%	64	1.23%	-361	-6.92%	5,215
Moniteau	3,764	62.06%	2,176	35.88%	125	2.06%	1,588	26.18%	6,065
Monroe	2,175	53.13%	1,860	45.43%	59	1.44%	315	7.70%	4,094
Montgomery	3,106	58.57%	2,092	39.45%	105	1.98%	1,014	19.12%	5,303
Morgan	4,460	56.59%	3,235	41.05%	186	2.36%	1,225	15.54%	7,881
New Madrid	3,416	47.01%	3,738	51.45%	112	1.54%	-322	-4.44%	7,266
Newton	14,232	67.25%	6,447	30.46%	483	2.28%	7,785	36.79%	21,162
Nodaway	5,161	57.03%	3,553	39.26%	335	3.70%	1,608	17.77%	9,049
Oregon	2,521	59.56%	1,568	37.04%	144	3.40%	953	22.52%	4,233
Osage	4,154	67.24%	1,938	31.37%	86	1.39%	2,216	35.87%	6,178
Ozark	2,663	62.05%	1,432	33.36%	197	4.59%	1,231	28.69%	4,292
Pemiscot	2,750	45.38%	3,245	53.55%	65	1.07%	-495	-8.17%	6,060
Perry	4,667	67.61%	2,085	30.20%	151	2.19%	2,582	37.41%	6,903
Pettis	9,533	60.51%	5,855	37.16%	367	2.33%	3,678	23.35%	15,755
Phelps	9,444	58.49%	6,262	38.78%	440	2.73%	3,182	19.71%	16,146
Pike	3,648	49.63%	3,557	48.39%	146	1.99%	91	1.24%	7,351
Platte	17,785	52.23%	15,325	45.00%	944	2.77%	2,460	7.23%	34,054
Polk	6,430	62.46%	3,606	35.03%	258	2.51%	2,824	27.43%	10,294
Pulaski	6,531	62.02%	3,800	36.08%	200	1.90%	2,731	25.94%	10,531
Putnam	1,593	68.25%	708	30.33%	33	1.41%	885	37.92%	2,334
Ralls	2,446	53.85%	2,033	44.76%	63	1.39%	413	9.09%	4,542
Randolph	4,844	52.73%	4,116	44.81%	226	2.46%	728	7.92%	9,186
Ray	4,517	46.34%	4,970	50.99%	260	2.67%	-453	-4.65%	9,747
Reynolds	1,762	56.28%	1,298	41.46%	71	2.27%	464	14.82%	3,131
Ripley	3,121	61.62%	1,820	35.93%	124	2.45%	1,301	25.69%	5,065
Saline	4,572	48.87%	4,585	49.01%	198	2.12%	-13	-0.14%	9,355
Schuyler	1,159	57.78%	808	40.28%	39	1.94%	351	17.50%	2,006
Scotland	1,335	61.27%	790	36.26%	54	2.48%	545	25.01%	2,179
Scott	8,999	57.30%	6,452	41.09%	253	1.61%	2,547	16.21%	15,704
Shannon	2,245	59.38%	1,430	37.82%	106	2.80%	815	21.56%	3,781
Shelby	1,936	59.44%	1,262	38.75%	59	1.81%	674	20.69%	3,257
St. Charles	72,114	56.04%	53,806	41.81%	2,766	2.15%	18,308	14.23%	128,686
St. Clair	2,731	57.63%	1,866	39.38%	142	3.00%	865	18.25%	4,739
St. Francois	9,327	49.50%	9,075	48.17%	439	2.33%	252	1.33%	18,841
St. Louis	224,689	46.15%	250,631	51.48%	11,564	2.38%	-25,942	-5.33%	486,884
St. Louis City	24,799	19.88%	96,557	77.40%	3,396	2.72%	-71,758	-57.52%	124,752
Ste. Genevieve	3,505	47.94%	3,600	49.24%	206	2.82%	-95	-1.30%	7,311
Stoddard	7,727	62.04%	4,476	35.94%	251	2.02%	3,251	26.10%	12,454
Stone	7,793	64.13%	4,055	33.37%	303	2.49%	3,738	30.76%	12,151
Sullivan	1,877	61.26%	1,127	36.78%	60	1.96%	750	24.48%	3,064
Taney	9,647	63.84%	5,092	33.70%	373	2.47%	4,555	30.14%	15,112
Texas	6,136	61.78%	3,486	35.10%	310	3.12%	2,650	26.68%	9,932
Vernon	4,985	59.29%	3,156	37.54%	267	3.18%	1,829	21.75%	8,408
Warren	5,979	55.67%	4,524	42.12%	237	2.21%	1,455	13.55%	10,740
Washington	4,020	48.64%	4,047	48.97%	198	2.40%	-27	-0.33%	8,265
Wayne	3,346	57.22%	2,387	40.82%	115	1.97%	959	16.40%	5,848
Webster	7,350	61.87%	4,174	35.13%	356	3.00%	3,176	26.74%	11,880
Worth	651	56.22%	469	40.50%	38	3.28%	182	15.72%	1,158
Wright	5,391	68.75%	2,250	28.70%	200	2.55%	3,141	40.05%	7,841
Totals	1,189,924	50.42%	1,111,138	47.08%	58,830	2.49%	78,786	3.34%	2,359,892

==== Counties that flipped from Democratic to Republican ====
- Audrain (largest city: Mexico)
- Bates (largest city: Butler)
- Benton (largest city: Warsaw)
- Caldwell (largest city: Hamilton)
- Callaway (largest city: Fulton)
- Carroll (largest city: Carrollton)
- Chariton (largest city: Salisbury)
- Clark (largest city: Kahoka)
- Clinton (largest city: Cameron)
- Crawford (largest city: Cuba)
- Daviess (largest city: Gallatin)
- DeKalb (largest city: Cameron)
- Dunklin (largest city: Kennett)
- Franklin (largest city: Washington)
- Gentry (largest city: Albany)
- Grundy (largest city: Trenton)
- Henry (largest city: Clinton)
- Hickory (largest city: Hermitage)
- Howard (largest city: Fayette)
- Iron (largest city: Ironton)
- Knox (largest city: Edina)
- Lafayette (largest city: Odessa)
- Lewis (largest city: Canton)
- Lincoln (largest city: Troy)
- Linn (largest city: Brookfield)
- Livingston (largest city: Chillicothe)
- Macon (largest city: Macon)
- Madison (largest city: Fredericktown)
- Marion (largest city: Hannibal)
- Mercer (largest city: Princeton)
- Monroe (largest city: Monroe City)
- Montgomery (largest city: Montgomery City)
- Nodaway (largest city: Maryville)
- Oregon (largest city: Thayer)
- Pike (largest city: Bowling Green)
- Ralls (largest city: Hannibal)
- Randolph (largest city: Moberly)
- Reynolds (largest city: Ellington)
- Ripley (largest city: Doniphan)
- Schuyler (largest city: Lancaster)
- Scotland (largest city: Memphis)
- Scott (largest city: Sikeston)
- Shannon (largest city: Winona)
- Shelby (largest city: Shelbina)
- St. Clair (largest city: Appleton City)
- St. Francois (largest city: Farmington)
- Sullivan (largest city: Milan)
- Vernon (largest city: Nevada)
- Wayne (largest city: Piedmont)
- Worth (largest city: Grant City)

==== By congressional district ====
Bush won six of nine congressional districts, including one that elected a Democrat.

District	Gore	Bush	Representative
1st	78%	20%	Bill Clay
1st	78%	20%	William Lacy Clay, Jr.
2nd	43%	55%	Jim Talent
2nd	43%	55%	Todd Akin
3rd	51%	46%	Dick Gephardt
4th	39%	58%	Ike Skelton
5th	61%	36%	Karen McCarthy
6th	44%	53%	Pat Danner
6th	44%	53%	Sam Graves
7th	35%	62%	Roy Blunt
8th	39%	59%	Jo Ann Emerson
9th	43%	54%	Kenny Hulshof

== Analysis ==
Beginning with the 2000 election, the status of the Missouri bellwether came into question. Between 1904 and 2004, Missouri was carried by the victor of each presidential election, with the exception of 1956. Though Bush won the presidency in the 2000 election through the Electoral College, he lost the national popular vote. The 2000 election was unique because this was the first time in over a century where the popular vote winner lost the general election. (In 1888, Missouri voted for Grover Cleveland, the incumbent Democrat, who lost to Republican candidate Benjamin Harrison.) Thus, controversy exists as to whether or not Missouri accurately predicted the victor in this election. In the subsequent election, Missouri voted for George W. Bush, who this time won both the popular vote and the Electoral College.

In any case, Missouri has voted reliably Republican since this election. The state very narrowly voted for John McCain in 2008 and for Mitt Romney by a wider margin in 2012; both men were ultimately defeated by Barack Obama in the nationwide election. The controversy is further complicated by the 2016 presidential election, where Missouri voted for Donald Trump by a landslide, while Hillary Clinton won the popular vote by nearly three million votes, but like in 2000, Trump won the Electoral College and became 45th President of the United States. Like 2000, political scientists have differing opinions on whether or not Missouri accurately predicted the victor.

== Electors ==
Technically the voters of Missouri cast their ballots for electors: representatives to the Electoral College. Missouri is allocated 11 electors because it has nine congressional districts and two senators. All candidates who appear on the ballot or qualify to receive write-in votes must submit a list of 11 electors, who pledge to vote for their candidate and his or her running mate. Whoever wins the majority of votes in the state is awarded all 11 electoral votes. Their chosen electors then vote for president and vice president. Although electors are pledged to their candidate and running mate, they are not obligated to vote for them. An elector who votes for someone other than his or her candidate is known as a faithless elector.

The electors of each state and the District of Columbia met on December 18, 2000 to cast their votes for president and vice president. The Electoral College itself never meets as one body. Instead, the electors from each state and the District of Columbia met in their respective capitols.

The following were the members of the Electoral College from the state. All were pledged to and voted for George W. Bush and Dick Cheney:

1. David Barklage
2. Bruce Bredeman
3. Marc Ellinger
4. Gordon Elliott
5. John Hancock
6. Stan Horacek
7. Homer Johnson
8. John Judd
9. Michael Kort
10. Dennis Owens
11. Al Rotskoff

== See also ==
- United States presidential elections in Missouri
- Presidency of George W. Bush
