= Not =

Not or NOT may refer to:

== Language ==
- Not, the general declarative form of "no", indicating a negation of a related statement that usually precedes
- ... Not!, a grammatical construction used as a contradiction, popularized in the early 1990s

== Science and technology ==
- Negation, a unary operator in logic depicted as ~, ¬, or !
- Bitwise NOT, an operator used in computer programming
- NOT gate, a digital logic gate (commonly called an inverter)
- Nordic Optical Telescope, an astronomical telescope at Roque de los Muchachos Observatory, La Palma, Canary Islands

== Other uses ==
- Nottingham railway station (station code NOT)
- Polish Federation of Engineering Associations (Naczelna Organizacja Techniczna)
- Not, Missouri, an unincorporated community in the United States
- "Not" (song), a 2019 song by Big Thief

== See also ==
- Knot (disambiguation)
