= Gangsta =

Gangsta may refer to:

== Urban culture ==
- Gangsta rap, a subgenre of hip hop music that evolved from hardcore hip hop and purports to reflect urban crime and the violent lifestyles of inner-city youths
- Gangster, a member of a gang
- Hip hop fashion, a style of dress associated with gangsta rap and other hip hop genres

== People ==
- The Gangstas, former professional wrestling tag team and stable
- Gangsta, American rapper signed to No Limit Forever Records

== Films and television ==
- Gangsta (manga), a Japanese manga and anime series
- Gangsta (film), a 2018 Belgian crime film
- Gangstas (film), a 2025 sequel to Gangsta

== Music ==
=== Songs ===
- "Gangsta" (Bell Biv DeVoe song), 1993
- "Gangsta" (Free Nationals, ASAP Rocky and Anderson .Paak song), 2024
- "Gangsta" (Kat Dahlia song), 2013
- "Gangsta" (Schoolboy Q song), 2014
- "Gangsta" (Slim Thug song), 2010
- "Gangsta" (Kehlani song), 2016
- "Gangsta?" (Tinchy Stryder song), 2010
- "Gangsta (Love 4 the Streets)", a 2001 song by Lil' Mo from Based on a True Story
- "Gangsta", a song by Akon featuring Daddy T, Picklehead and Devyne from Trouble
- "Gangsta", a song by Tune-Yards from Whokill
- "Gangsta", a song by Royce da 5'9" from Death Is Certain
- "Gangsta", a song by Yelawolf from Trunk Muzik Returns
- "Gangsta", a song by Young Dro from Best Thang Smokin'

== See also ==
- Gangsta Gangsta (disambiguation)
- Gangsta's Paradise (disambiguation)
- Gangster (disambiguation)
