= Venice, Missouri =

Unincorporated community in Missouri, U.S.

Coordinates: 37°12′28″N 91°23′59″W

Venice is an unincorporated community in Shannon County, in the U.S. state of Missouri. The community is located on Missouri Route 19, northwest of Eminence and south of Round Spring.

== History ==
A post office called Venice was established in 1913, and remained in operation until 1933. The name was selected from an early postmaster's reading material.
