= Carroll Township, Texas County, Missouri =

Township in the US state of Missouri

Coordinates: 37.1875°N 91.6994°W

Carroll Township is a township in Texas County, in the U.S. state of Missouri.

Carroll Township was erected in 1845, taking its name from E. G. Carroll, a pioneer citizen. The western portion of the city of Summerville is in the township. The hamlet of Arroll is located south of the township in adjoining Date Township.
