= Dooley Hollow =

Valley in Missouri, United States

Coordinates: 37.3736567°N 91.5587548°W

Dooley Hollow is a valley in Shannon County in the U.S. state of Missouri.

Dooley Hollow has the name of the local Dooley family.
