= Lorenzo Carcaterra =

American writer

- Born: October 16, 1954 (age 72); New York City, U.S.
- Occupations: Novelist; blogger; journalist
- Children: 2

Lorenzo Carcaterra (born October 16, 1954) is an American writer of Italian descent. Hell's Kitchen is the setting for his most famous book, Sleepers, which was adapted as a 1996 film of the same name. In April 2009, he joined True/Slant as a blogger. True/Slant ceased operations on July 31, 2010, after only being open for a little less than a year total.

== Biography ==
Carcaterra was born in Hell's Kitchen, Manhattan, New York. His Italian family was from the island of Ischia, 18 miles (29 km) off the coast of Naples.

He became a journalist in 1980, when his first articles begin to appear in various newspapers.

Carcaterra's wife, Susan Toepfer, died of lung cancer on December 24, 2013. She was also the mother of Carcaterra's two children, Kate and Nick.

== Published works ==
=== Books ===
- A Safe Place (1993)
- Sleepers (1995)
  - In the book, Carcaterra writes about himself (played in the film by Jason Patric) and three young friends living in the Hell's Kitchen section of Manhattan in the 1960s. After they stage a street prank that unintentionally leaves a man seriously injured, the book says, the four are sent to an upstate juvenile detention center, where they are brutalized and sexually assaulted by the facility's guards. The Sacred Heart of Jesus Church and School on the West Side of Manhattan, which Carcaterra attended, expressed outrage about Carcaterra's assertions, while the Manhattan District Attorney's office stated that there were no records of a case like the one described in the book. Carcaterra has admitted that he deliberately fictionalized certain details of the story, saying, "You have to change dates, names, places, people. The way they looked; you have to make them look a different way. If it happened here, you have to make it happen there."
- Apaches (1997)
- Gangster (2001)
- Street Boys (2002)
- Paradise City (2004)
- Chasers (2007)
- Midnight Angels (2010)
- The Wolf (2014)
- Tin Badges (2019)

=== Other ===
- Introduction to Modern Library Classics unabridged version of The Count of Monte Cristo, a novel which plays an important role in Carcaterra's autobiographical novel Sleepers
- He has written and produced a number of episodes of Law & Order.
- He used his knowledge of New York City to contribute to the 2008 video game Alone in the Dark.
- He has written for other publications, including National Geographic Traveler.
