= Ink, Missouri =

- Ghost town
- Location within the state of Missouri
- Coordinates: 37°15′29″N 91°29′1″W
- Country: United States
- State: Missouri
- County: Shannon
- Township: Eminence
- Time zone: UTC-6 (Central (CST))
  - Summer (DST): UTC-5 (CDT)
- Postal code: 65466
- Area code: 573
- GNIS feature ID: 740954

Ink is a ghost town in Shannon County, Missouri, United States. It is located at the intersection of Missouri Route N and county road 328. It is located on the north side of Spring Valley Creek just south of the Sunklands Conservation Area.

== History ==
A post office called Ink was established in 1885, and remained in operation until 1954. According to folklorist Margot Ford McMillen, the unusual name of the village came about literally by accident. After several attempts at a name were rejected, a community meeting was held. Wanting a name short and memorable, a children's spelling book with three-letter words such as cat, bat, dog, and the like was consulted. The meeting grew lengthy, and finally, someone accidentally spilled an ink well onto the book and table. Another citizen suggested, "why not call the town Ink?" The U.S. postal authorities found it acceptable, thus the village was officially so named. In spite of the tradition, Ink may have been named simply on account of the name's brevity.
