= Flatwood, Missouri =

Unincorporated community in Missouri, U.S.

Coordinates: 37°13′16″N 91°26′51″W

Flatwood is an unincorporated community in Shannon County, in the U.S. state of Missouri.

== History ==
The community once contained a school, the Flatwoods School. The schoolhouse was named for flatwoods in the area.
