= Gang, Missouri =

Unincorporated community in Missouri, U.S.

Coordinates: 37°12′24″N 91°13′50″W

Gang is an unincorporated community in eastern Shannon County, in the Ozarks of southern Missouri, United States. The community was located on Blair Creek, approximately four miles north of its confluence with the Current River.

== History ==
A post office called Gang was established in 1892, and remained in operation until 1942. "The gang" was an affectionate nickname for the early townspeople, hence the name.
