= Blair Creek =

Stream in southern Missouri, U.S.

Coordinates: 37°10′48″N 91°12′25″W

Blair Creek is a stream in eastern Shannon County in the Ozarks of southern Missouri. It is a tributary of the Current River.

The headwaters are at and the confluence with the Current is at .

Blair Creek has the name of the local Blair family.

== See also ==
- List of rivers of Missouri
