= Alma Heflin =

American pilot and the first woman commercial test pilot

- Born: Alma Heflin; 2 Sep 1910; Winona, Shannon County, Missouri, USA
- Died: 24 Apr 2000
- Other names: Alma Heflin McCormick
- Known for: First woman commercial test pilot
- Spouse: Archie Thomas Edward McCormick
- Children: 2

Alma Heflin (1910 — 2000), was an American pilot and the first woman commercial test pilot. She was also a pioneering child psychologist.

== Biography ==
Alma Heflin was born in Winona, Shannon County, Missouri, to Irvin Elgin Heflin and Nora Edith Kelley. As a child, Heflin watched the forced landing of a small plane in a nearby field and decided to become a pilot. Financial limits meant she had completed primary school training with a bachelor's degree from Eastern Washington College in 1936 when she qualified as a private pilot. Heflin managed to buy her own Piper airplane and travelled to Lock Haven, Pennsylvania for it.

She impressed the founder of the Piper Aircraft Co., William T. Piper. As a result he offered her a job and she began as an apprentice mechanic there. Initially she was ground crew but eventually she moved into sales and began flying the aircraft around the country to potential buyers. She flew extensively and attended air shows and other events. In 1938 she was the leader of 189 planes to Miami, Florida got for the All-American Aerial Maneuvers.

In 1940 she and Margie McQuin took Heflin's new Piper J-4 across country to Alaska. It took the pair 13 days to cross the United States. They were unable to fly across Canadian airspace because of the Second World War restrictions and instead the plane was shipped from Seattle to Juneau. They then flew on to Fairbanks, arriving on 16 July 1940.

On her return, Heflin contributed to the war effort by becoming the test pilot for the Piper O-59 Grasshoppers being produced in Lock Haven for the United States Army. She took her first test flight on 12 November 1941. As a result she is believed to be the first woman commercial test pilot.

When the war was over Heflin completed a master of education from her alma mater, Eastern Washington College, graduating in 1949. She went on to work initially with children with intellectual disabilities in the Tri-Cities, Washington. Heflin and McCormick founded the Adastra School for Gifted Children in Seattle which she ran from 1957 to 1964. The school then amalgamated with another and became Seattle Country Day School.

Heflin produced her memoir of her Alaska trip and a novel. She also wrote in professional publications and went on to complete a Ph.D. from Clayton University in 1977. Heflin had been an editor for Cub Flyer, Western Story Magazine, and Wild West Weekly as well as contributing to similar publications.

== Personal life ==
Heflin married Archie McCormick 14 July 1942. McCormick was a United States Air Force pilot Heflin had met during her trip to Alaska. The couple had two adopted children; Thomas James and Kelly Jean. Heflin died in 2000 and is buried in Arlington National Cemetery along with her husband.

== Bibliography ==
- Adventure was the compass, 1942
- Flying Magazine, 1943-1946
- Merry makes a choice, 1949
