= Inked =

Inked may refer to:

- Inked (magazine), an American tattoo lifestyle periodical
- Inked (video game), a 2018 puzzle-platform game
- "Inked" (7th Heaven), a 2007 TV episode

== See also ==
- Ink (disambiguation)
