= Shawnee, Missouri =

Unincorporated community in Missouri, U.S.

Coordinates: 37°07′17″N 91°15′37″W

Shawnee is an historic unincorporated community in Shannon County, in the Ozarks of southern Missouri, United States. The community was located on Little Shawnee Creek, approximately two miles southeast of Eminence at an elevation of 825 feet. The location is along County Road 507, about midway between Missouri Route 106 to the north and Missouri Route H to the southeast.

== History ==
A post office called "Shawnee" was established in 1889, and remained in operation until 1920. The community derives its name from the Shawnee Indians.
