= Sleepers (film) =

1996 film by Barry Levinson

- Theatrical release poster
- Directed by: Barry Levinson
- Screenplay by: Barry Levinson
- Based on: Sleepers by Lorenzo Carcaterra
- Produced by: Barry Levinson; Steve Golin
- Starring: Kevin Bacon; Robert De Niro; Dustin Hoffman; Bruno Kirby; Jason Patric; Brad Pitt; Brad Renfro; Minnie Driver; Vittorio Gassman
- Cinematography: Michael Ballhaus
- Edited by: Stu Linder
- Music by: John Williams
- Production companies: PolyGram Filmed Entertainment; Propaganda Films; Baltimore Pictures; Astoria Films
- Distributed by: Warner Bros. (North America); PolyGram Filmed Entertainment (International)
- Release date: October 18, 1996
- Running time: 147 minutes
- Country: United States
- Language: English
- Budget: $44 million
- Box office: $165.6 million

Sleepers is a 1996 American legal crime drama film; written, produced, and directed by Barry Levinson. It is based on Lorenzo Carcaterra's 1995 book of the same name. The film stars an ensemble cast including Kevin Bacon, Robert De Niro, Dustin Hoffman, Bruno Kirby, Jason Patric, Brad Pitt, Brad Renfro, Minnie Driver, and Vittorio Gassman. The title is an American slang term for juvenile delinquents who serve sentences longer than nine months.

Reporter "Shakes" Carcaterra and Assistant District Attorney Michael Sullivan help childhood friends Tommy and John, who kill a sadistic guard who had abused them all while they were incarcerated in a juvenile detention center.

Sleepers was theatrically released on October 18th, 1996 by Warner Bros. in the United States, with PolyGram Filmed Entertainment releasing in other territories. The film received positive reviews from critics and was a box-office hit, grossing $165.6 million against a $44 million budget.

== Plot ==
In Hell's Kitchen, Manhattan in the summer of 1967, childhood friends Lorenzo "Shakes" Carcaterra, Tommy Marcano, Michael Sullivan and John Reilly are running small errands for local gangster "King" Benny. After they injure a man by accidentally rolling a stolen hot-dog cart down a set of subway stairs, the boys are sentenced to serve time at the juvenile detention center Wilkinson Home for Boys in Upstate New York. Shakes had considered fleeing to avoid prosecution, but Father Bobby Carillo convinced him to face his fears and admit his wrongs. Shakes receives six-to-twelve months, while the others are given 12-to-18 months.

During their incarceration, the boys experience sexual abuse and torture from guards Sean Nokes, Henry Addison, Ralph Ferguson and Adam Styler. The boys participate in Wilkinson's annual football game between the guards and inmates and with the help of inmate "Rizzo" Robinson, they win the game. The humiliated guards move the boys to solitary confinement for weeks, where they're systematically beaten. Rizzo, an African-American, is beaten more severely and dies. His family is told that he died of pneumonia. In the spring of 1968, shortly before his release, Shakes suggests they publicly report the abuse but the others refuse, thinking no one would believe or care about such a report. The boys vow to never speak of the abuse again. The night before Shakes' release, the guards arrange a "farewell party" at which all four boys are raped.

In the fall of 1981, John and Tommy, now career criminals working with the Irish Mob, unexpectedly encounter Nokes in a Hell's Kitchen pub. They confront him about the abuse he inflicted on them, and John and Tommy fatally shoot him in plain sight of the patrons and staff. Michael, now an assistant district attorney, arranges to be assigned to the case so he can use the prosecution as a means to expose the abusive guards at Wilkinson's. Shakes, now a timetable clerk for The New York Times works with Michael and Carol to have John and Tommy acquitted. Shakes reunites with Benny and enlists his help to use his influence for their benefit. John and Tommy are represented by Danny Snyder, an alcoholic defense lawyer who is reluctant to take their case until Benny convinces him. In court, despite his poor presentation, Snyder manages to cast significant doubt on the testimony of Mrs. Salinas, a woman who witnessed the murder. Two other witnesses are intimidated into silence by Benny.

Michael plans to attack Nokes' reputation and provide John and Tommy with a convincing alibi. Michael convinces a judge to accept Ferguson (now a social worker), as a witness. After being badgered by Snyder on his relationship with Nokes, Ferguson tearfully admits on the witness stand that the guards systematically abused the boys before the judge has his testimony stricken from the record and advises him to stay in town for questioning. Continuing their plan, Shakes gives confidential information to the police on Styler, a corrupt police officer, and is later imprisoned for taking bribes and murdering a drug dealer. Next, Shakes learns that Addison, a politician, continued to molest children. With this information, Shakes has Benny reach out to Eddie 'Little Caesar' Robinson, a ganglord and Rizzo's older brother, and informs him of Addison's involvement in Rizzo's death. Addison is later murdered by the gangsters. Father Bobby reluctantly agrees to perjure himself upon learning about the boys' experiences at Wilkinson's and testifies that John and Tommy were with him at a New York Knicks game during the murder, producing three ticket stubs as proof. John and Tommy are acquitted.

Michael, Shakes, John and Tommy celebrate the acquittal with Carol at a local bar. A narration from Shakes reveals that would be the last time they would all be together; Shakes remains in Hell's Kitchen, becoming a trainee reporter. Michael quits the DA's office, moves to the English countryside and never marries. John and Tommy both die before age 30; John by alcohol poisoning and Tommy at the hands of rival criminals. Carol remains in Hell's Kitchen as a social worker, and nicknames her son "Shakes".

== Cast ==
- Kevin Bacon as Sean Nokes
- Robert De Niro as Father Robert “Bobby” Carillo
- Dustin Hoffman as Danny Snyder
- Bruno Kirby as Mr. Carcaterra, Shakes' father
- Jason Patric as Lorenzo 'Shakes' Carcaterra
  - Joe Perrino as Young Shakes
- Brad Pitt as Michael Sullivan
  - Brad Renfro as Young Michael Sullivan
- Ron Eldard as John Riley
  - Geoffrey Wigdor as Young John Riley
- Billy Crudup as Thomas “Tommy” Marcano
  - Jonathan Tucker as Young Tommy Marcano
- Vittorio Gassman as Benny 'King Benny'
  - Sean Patrick Reilly as Young 'King Benny'
- Terry Kinney as Ralph Ferguson
- Frank Medrano as 'Fat' Mancho
- Minnie Driver as Carol Martinez
  - Monica Polito as Young Carol Martinez
- Peter McRobbie as Lawyer
- Danny Mastrogiorgio as Nick Davenport
- Eugene Byrd as Rizzo Robinson
- Jeffrey Donovan as Henry Addison
- Wendell Pierce as Eddie 'Little Caesar' Robinson
- Lennie Loftin as Adam Styler
- Aida Turturro as Mrs. Salinas
- Dash Mihok as K.C.
- Angela Rago as Shakes' Mother
- John Slattery as Mr. Carlson
- James Pickens Jr. as Guard Marlboro
- George Georgiadis as Hot Dog Vendor
- Peter Gerety as Juvenile Lawyer

== Production ==
Lorenzo Carcaterra first submitted a manuscript of his book Sleepers to Ballantine Books, which immediately attracted interest from multiple film companies. Ultimately, Propaganda Films managed to obtain the movie rights for $2.1 million at an auction in February 1995. Barry Levinson was attached as director mere days afterward and opted to write the screenplay himself.

The first words spoken in the film are: "This is a true story about friendship that runs deeper than blood". When the film was released, there was controversy about how much of the novel claimed to be a true story and how much had been invented by Carcaterra. The truthfulness and factual accuracy of the film — and the book on which it is based — were challenged by the Sacred Heart of Jesus Church and School in Manhattan (the school attended by Carcaterra) and by the Manhattan District Attorney's office, among others. Carcaterra has acknowledged that most details in the book were fictionalized but maintained that the events described in the book actually occurred.

Brad Pitt was cast alongside Robert De Niro in July 1995, and filming began the following month, in August 1995. In response to the fast pace of the production process, Ballantine scheduled the book to be released around the same time that De Niro and Pitt were cast, in August 1995. Emilio Estevez was cast as John Riley but was already involved in three movies that year; Sandra Bullock was cast as Carol Martinez but was already involved in the movie A Time to Kill and was thus replaced by Minnie Driver. As they had previously worked together on Diner, Kevin Bacon was approached by Levinson to play the role of Sean Nokes but did not read the book until after he accepted the role. Due to the logistics of filming, Bacon did not meet De Niro or Dustin Hoffman until the film's premiere in Venice.

== Release ==
=== Box office ===
In its opening weekend, the film grossed $12.3 million from 1,915 theaters in the United States and Canada, debuting atop of the box office. Sleepers grossed $53.3 million domestically and $112.3 million internationally, for a worldwide total of $165.6 million.

=== Critical response ===
On Rotten Tomatoes, the film holds an approval rating of 76%, based on 62 reviews. The site's critics consensus reads: "Old friendships are awakened by the need for revenge, making Sleepers a haunting nightmare burdened by voiceover yet terrifically captured by Barry Levinson." Metacritic assigned the film a weighted average score of 49 out of 100, based on 18 critics, indicating "mixed or average reviews". Audiences polled by CinemaScore gave the film an average grade of "A–" (on a scale of A+ to F).

Critics praised the performances of De Niro, Hoffman, Bacon and the young cast, as well as the cinematography and production design. However, multiple critics said the film loses focus in its second half. Owen Gleiberman of Entertainment Weekly wrote: "Sleepers wants to do something impossible — merge the mournful, drenched-in-shame emotions of child abuse with the huckster gamesmanship of a contraption like The Sting."

David Ansen of Newsweek criticized Levinson's script and asserted that the adult characters of Shakes Carcaterra (Jason Patric), Michael Sullivan (Pitt), John (Ron Eldard) and Tommy Marciano (Billy Crudup) were not fully fleshed out. Roger Ebert of the Chicago Sun-Times awarded the film three stars of four. Steve Davis of The Austin Chronicle wrote: "What a more interesting film this would have been had Levinson found a way to integrate the past and the present so that one informed the other."

=== Accolades ===
Award	Category	Nominee(s)	Result	Ref.
Academy Awards	Best Original Dramatic Score	John Williams	Nominated	
London Film Critics Circle Awards	British Supporting Actress of the Year	Minnie Driver (Note: Also for Big Night and Grosse Pointe Blank)	Won	
Young Artist Awards	Best Performance in a Feature Film – Leading Young Actor	Joe Perrino	Nominated	
Young Artist Awards	Best Performance in a Feature Film – Supporting Young Actor	Geoffrey Wigdor	Nominated	
YoungStar Awards	Best Performance by a Young Actor in a Drama Film	Joe Perrino	Nominated	
YoungStar Awards	Best Performance by a Young Actor in a Drama Film	Brad Renfro	Nominated	

== Home media ==
The film was released on VHS, Laserdisc and DVD on April 1, 1997, and on Blu-ray on August 2, 2011. The film was also released on 4K Ultra HD Blu-Ray on April 21, 2026.
