= Date Township, Texas County, Missouri =

Township in the US state of Missouri

Coordinates: 37.0897°N 91.7097°W

Date Township is a township in the southeast corner of Texas County, in the U.S. state of Missouri.

Date Township was erected in 1896, taking its name from a community of the same name within its borders. The exact location of the extinct community of Date is unknown to the GNIS. The hamlet of Arroll is located in the township.
