= David Barklage =

Missouri political consultant

David Barklage (born April 21, 1961) is a Republican political consultant from Missouri. He is President of The Barklage Company.

== Background ==
=== Early life and education ===
Barklage was raised in Cape Girardeau, Missouri and attended Cape Girardeau Central High School, where he was elected Student Body President. He then attended Southeast Missouri State University where he was elected to the Cape Girardeau City Council.

== Political career ==
=== Political Consulting ===
Barklage began working in politics when he was a senior in college when he served as Campaign Manager to U.S. Congressman Bill Emerson. Barklage is the longtime political consultant and advisor to Missouri Lieutenant Governor Peter D. Kinder. As of 2010, Barklage’s firm, Barklage & Knodell, had a 95% win rate for its clients in the previous election cycle. Barklage has also served as an advisor to the Missouri House Republican Campaign Committee and the Missouri Senate Majority Fund.

=== Presidential Elector ===
Barklage served as a Presidential Elector for the state of Missouri in the 2000 election. He was pledged to elect George W. Bush for president and Dick Cheney for vice-president.

== Controversies ==
In 2002, when serving as Chief of Staff to then-Senate President Pro Tem Peter Kinder, controversy of a potential conflict of interest surrounded Barklage due to his active political consulting work. As a result, Barklage resigned in February 2002, citing that it was for the betterment of the Senate if he step aside and not cause a distraction.
