= Rat, Missouri =

Unincorporated community in Missouri, U.S.

- Unincorporated community
- Location within the state of Missouri
- Coordinates: 37°22′21″N 91°13′39″W
- Country: United States
- State: Missouri
- County: Shannon
- Township: Moore
- Time zone: UTC-6 (Central (CST))
  - Summer (DST): UTC-5 (CDT)
- Postal code: 63629
- Area code: 573
- GNIS feature ID: 751809

Rat is an unincorporated community in northeast Shannon County, in the U.S. state of Missouri. The community is adjacent to Big Creek, approximately six miles south-southwest of Bunker.

== History ==
A post office called Rat was established in 1898, and remained in operation until it was discontinued in 1954. The community was named "Rat" in protest after postal authorities denied the townspeople their first choice of "Buckshorn". Rat has been noted for its unusual place name.
