= Timber, Missouri =

Unincorporated community in Missouri, U.S.

Coordinates: 37°21′47″N 91°25′36″W

Timber is an unincorporated community in northern Shannon County, in the Ozarks of southern Missouri. The community is located on Missouri Route 19, south of Shannondale. Timber, Missouri is known to have no more than 75 citizens

== History ==
A post office called Timber was established in 1894, and remained in operation until 1954. The community was named after vast tracts of timber near the original town site.
