= Criminal gang =

A gang is a group of individuals that collectively engage in antisocial behavior.

Criminal gang may also refer to:

- Prison gang
- Outlaw motorcycle club

== See also ==
- Gang (disambiguation)
