= Shannondale, Shannon County, Missouri =

Unincorporated community in Missouri, U.S.

Coordinates: 37°23′24″N 91°26′16″W

Shannondale is a church-owned, 4,000-acre forest and community center located in northern Shannon County, in the Ozarks of southern Missouri, United States. The community is located on Missouri Route 19, north of Timber.

Shannondale was not platted in 1874 by Charles Shannon, and named after him. (This statement is true for the "other" Shannondale which is in Chariton County.)
