= Munsell, Missouri =

Unincorporated community in Missouri, U.S.

Coordinates: 37°05′53″N 91°19′39″W

Munsell is an unincorporated community in Shannon County, in the U.S. state of Missouri.

The community once contained Munsell School, now defunct. The schoolhouse had the name of Levi Munsell, a local minister.
