= Deslet, Missouri =

Unincorporated community in Missouri, US

Coordinates: 37°09′43″N 91°07′14″W

Deslet is an unincorporated community in eastern Shannon County, in the Ozarks of southern Missouri, United States. The community was located along the west floodplain of Carr Creek, approximately two miles north of the confluence of the southerly flowing Carr Creek with the Current River.

== History ==
A post office called Deslet was established in 1896, and remained in operation until 1955. The community was so named on account of its rural or "desolate" location (a postal error accounts for the error in spelling, which was never corrected).
