= Inky =

Inky may refer to:

== People ==
=== People with the nickname Inky ===
- Pete Incaviglia (born 1964), American professional baseball player
- Keith Ingram (headmaster) (1929–2007), British head teacher
- Inky Moore (1925–2000), American conservationist

=== People with the given name Inky ===
- Inky Mark (born 1947), Canadian politician

== Arts, entertainment, and media ==
- Inky (Pac-Man), the cyan ghost in the arcade game Pac-Man
- Inky, a nickname for The Philadelphia Inquirer

== Other uses ==
- Inky (police dog), a police dog who appeared in the British police drama Softly, Softly: Taskforce
- Inky, slang for a printer
- Inky, open source software for editing interactive stories from Inkle

== See also ==
- Ink
- Inki
- Inkie
