= Gang (disambiguation) =

A gang is a group of recurrently associating individuals who share a common identity.

Gang may also refer to:

== People ==
- Gang of Balhae (died 809), sixth king of Balhae
- Gang Bing (died 1410), Chinese general and eunuch who served during the Ming dynasty
- Gang Badoy, public intellectual, radio and television host, feature writer, businesswoman, and educator from the Philippines
- Gang Tian (born 1958), Chinese mathematician
- Jeanne Gang (born 1964), American architect
- Kang (Korean surname) or Gang, a common Korean surname

== Places ==
- Gang, Cornwall, UK, a hamlet
- Gang, Missouri, a community in the United States
- Gang Ranch, British Columbia, Canada

== Arts and entertainment ==
=== Film and television ===
- Gang (film), a Bollywood film released in 2000
- Gangs (film), a Hong Kong film directed by Lawrence Ah Mon, released in 1988
- The Gang (film), a Malayalam film released in 2000
- "Gangs" (Year of the Rabbit), a 2019 television episode
- The nickname of the Gang from Paddy’s Pub in It's Always Sunny in Philadelphia

=== Music ===
- Gang (album), a 1986 album by Johnny Hallyday
- Gang (Headie One and Fred Again album), a 2020 collaborative album by Headie One and Fred Again
- Gangs (album), a 2011 album by And So I Watch You from Afar
- "Gang" (Masaharu Fukuyama song), a 2001 song by Masaharu Fukuyama
- "Gang" (Rain song), a 2017 song by Rain
- "Gang", song by Swans from the 1983 album Filth

== Other uses ==
- Gang, a collective noun for certain species; see List of collective nouns
- Gang, alternate spelling of Gangr, a giant in Norse mythology
- Studio Gang Architects, an architecture firm led by Jeanne Gang
- Workgang, a group of individuals who are assigned, or engaged in, a common task.
- A modern name for the star 50 Cassiopeiae, after a Chinese constellation

== See also ==
- Chain gang, a group of prisoners chained together to perform work
- Jiang (disambiguation)
