= Midridge, Missouri =

Unincorporated community in Missouri, U.S.

Midridge
- Unincorporated community
- Location within the state of Missouri
- Coordinates: 37°20′7″N 91°13′18″W
- Country: United States
- State: Missouri
- County: Shannon
- Township: Moore
- Elevation: 1,125 ft (343 m)
- Time zone: UTC-6 (Central (CST))
  - Summer (DST): UTC-5 (CDT)
- GNIS feature ID: 751052

Midridge is an unincorporated community in northeastern Shannon County, Missouri, United States. It is located on a county road approximately sixteen miles northeast of Eminence.

A post office called Midridge was established in 1931, and remained in operation until 1964. The community was so named on account of its location midway across a ridge.
