= Delaware, Missouri =

Unincorporated community in Missouri, U.S.

Coordinates: 37°06′12″N 91°24′29″W

Delaware is an unincorporated community in eastern Shannon County, in the U.S. state of Missouri. The community is located on Mahans Creek approximately four miles southwest of Eminence.

== History ==
A post office called Delaware was established in 1923, and remained in operation until 1941. The community was named after the Delaware Indians.
