= Gangsta Gangsta (disambiguation) =

"Gangsta Gangsta" is a 1988 song by N.W.A.

Gangsta Gangsta may also refer to:

- "Gangsta Gangsta", a song by Lil' Scrappy from Bred 2 Die, Born 2 Live, 2006
- "Gangsta Gangsta" (Degrassi: The Next Generation), a television episode

== See also ==
- "Gangster, Gangster", a 2008 song by Styles P from Super Gangster (Extraordinary Gentleman)
