= Joseph Perrino =

American actor

- Born: April 30, 1982 (age 44); The Bronx, New York, U.S.
- Education: New York University (MFA)
- Occupation: Actor
- Years active: 1995-present
- Spouse: Youri Cho (m. 2019)

Joseph Perrino (born April 30, 1982) is an American actor. He is best known for his role in the drama film Sleepers in 1996.

== Life and career ==
Joseph Perrino is an American film, television and stage actor, best known for his roles in the feature film Sleepers and the television series The Sopranos.

Perrino's acting career began with his portrayal of Lorenzo "Shakes" Carcaterra, one of the lead roles in the film Sleepers. His performance reviewed positive reviews; he was nominated for a Young Artist Award for Best Leading Young Actor in a Feature Film and was named a Breakthrough Star by People Magazine.

Perrino went on to work with Anna Paquin, playing her love interest, Ross Epstein, in Tony Goldwyn's A Walk on the Moon. He then played a gang leader named Blade in The Mighty, starring Sharon Stone. Perrino moved on to the indie film The Bumblebee Flies Anyway, playing Mazzo, a terminally ill cancer patient dealing with his last days on earth.

After a hiatus from acting, Perrino returned to appear in the last season of The Sopranos, playing Jason Gervasi, a young mobster.

In 2017, Perrino began work on the STARZ network's hit crime series Power in its 5th season as Vincent Ragni, a boss in the Italian syndicate. According to Power creator Courtney A. Kemp, Perrino made such a favorable impression that the storyline was retooled to keep Perrino's character alive.

== Filmography ==
- 1996 The Juror as Tommy Riggio
- 1996 Sleepers as Young Lorenzo 'Shakes' Carcaterra
- 1997 Homicide: Life on the Street (TV Series) as Young Johnny Munch
- 1998 The Mighty as Tony D [Blade]
- 1999 A Walk on the Moon as Ross Epstein
- 1999 The Bumblebee Flies Anyway as Mazzo
- 2006 The Immaculate Misconception as Joey
- 2007 The Sopranos (TV Series) as Jason Gervasi
- 2007 The Hit as Tony 'Little Tony'
- 2008 Assassination of a High School President as 'Dutch' Middleton
- 2010 Law & Order (TV Series) as Parole Officer Jack McKenzie
- 2013 Run as Security Guard Owens
- 2013 The Family as Joey, Mobster
- 2014 Before I Disappear as Ellis
- 2014 Blue Bloods (TV Series) as Doorman Sergio
- 2015 4 Kings as Unknown
- 2016 The Brooklyn Banker as Nick
- 2017 Cigarette Soup as Skinner
- 2017 Happy! (TV Series) as Pal Scaramucci
- 2018–2020 Power (TV Series) as Vincent Ragni
- 2019 It's Bruno! (TV Series) as Mario
- 2019 The Wisdom Tooth as Enrico
- 2023 The Foxes of Hydesville (narrative podcast) as Josiah Bessell, Red Taylor

== Awards and nominations ==
Young Artist Awards

- 1997: Nominated, "Best Performance in a Feature Film by a Leading Young Actor" - Sleepers

YoungStar Awards

- 1997: Nominated, "Best Performance by a Young Actor in a Drama Film" - Sleepers
