= Workgang =

A Workgang is a group of individuals who are assigned, or engaged in, a common task. Examples include prison workgangs or non-Prison Workgangs used for farming, construction, trash collection/waste management, fire fighting, or emergency services. Such workgangs have varying levels of supervision ranging from Armed Corrections Officers, Unarmed Community Supervision, to self-supervised Trustees.

== See also ==
- Swing gang, the filmmaking group
- Penal labor in the United States
