= Gangster (novel) =

Novel by Lorenzo Carcaterra

- Author: Lorenzo Carcaterra
- Language: English
- Genre: Novel
- Publisher: Ballantine Books
- Publication date: 2001
- Publication place: United States
- Media type: Print (Hardback & Paperback)
- Pages: 416 pp (paperback edition)
- ISBN: 978-0-345-42529-4 (paperback edition)
- OCLC: 50325909
- LC Class: CPB Box no. 2011 vol. 5
- Preceded by: Street Boys
- Followed by: Apaches

Gangster is a novel by Lorenzo Carcaterra, published in 2001, narrating the life of Angelo Vestieri from the early 20th Century until his death, and his rise to power in the New York City underworld.

== Plot summary ==
The novel opens in 1996 as Gabe, now middle-aged, keeps watch over an old Angelo Vestieri on his hospital deathbed. Slipping back in time to the Depression, the narrative tracks the rise of the famed mob boss from a simple Italian immigrant to the most powerful man of Manhattan's underworld, when a ten-year-old Gabe, by chance, walks into Vestieri's bar. Vestieri takes the boy under his wing and ushers him into the world of organized crime. Gabe learns what it takes to rule an empire with his mentor, yet when the time comes for Gabe to take over Angelo's operation, he refuses, choosing a normal life despite his deep love for Vestieri.

== Bibliography ==
- Lorenzo Cacaterra (January 30, 2001). Gangster. Ballantine Books.
