= Montier Township, Shannon County, Missouri =

Township in the American state of Missouri

Coordinates: 37.0111°N 91.5933°W

Montier Township is an inactive township in Shannon County, in the U.S. state of Missouri.

Montier Township was erected in 1901, taking its name from the community of Montier, Missouri.
