= I.N.K. Invisible Network of Kids =

- The official logo for the series.
- Genre: Action; Adventure; Comedy; Musical
- Created by: Claire Underwood; David Hodgson
- Directed by: Prakash Topsy
- Voices of: Sophie Arthuys; Alexis Tomassian; Christèle Wurmser; Susan Sindberg; Thierry Ragueneau; Brigitte Virtudes; Lionel Melet; Matthew Géczy
- Theme music composer: Felix Fog
- Opening theme: "INK"
- Composers: Lionel Payet Pigeon; Robert Benzrihem; Felix Fog (songs)
- Country of origin: France
- Original language: French
- No. of seasons: 1
- No. of episodes: 26

Production
- Executive producer: Samuel Kaminka
- Running time: 23 minutes
- Production company: Samka Productions

Original release
- Network: France 3
- Release: May 16, 2009 – June 23, 2010

I.N.K. Invisible Network of Kids (known in French as Mission Invisible) is a French animated series directed by Prakash Topsy, produced by Samka Productions (France) and broadcaster France 3 on May 16, 2009. The series was broadcast on the Australian children's channel ABC Entertains (formerly ABC3) on June 2, 2010.

== Plot ==
Pinkerton School is a boarding school with two teachers. One of the teachers, Mr. Soper, is nice, and the other, Ms. Macbeth, is evil and is constantly trying to enslave the children of the school. However, four of the students act as a secret organisation known as "The Invisible Network of Kids", or "I.N.K." for short. I.N.K's mission is to thwart all of Ms. Macbeth's evil plans.

== Characters ==
=== Main characters ===
Vin (voiced by Barbara Scaff). Vin is the founder of the network. He always keeps his hair stylish and tries to keep himself cute. He describes himself as full of beauty and the most handsome guy in Pinkerton. In the episode "The New Student" it is revealed that Vin is an orphan. In "Voodoo Shampoo" and "The Outcast", it is revealed he may have feelings for Zero. In the episode "Lovestruck Stinkbomb", Vin and Zero are accused of being in love but they do not confirm anything. In episode "Ghost Of Pinkerton", during the Romeo and Juliet play, Vin and Zero share a kiss; in the episode "Back to the Past", at the end, he can be seen with hearts in his eyes as he looks at Zero, implying that he may have feelings for her. Although Zero's feeling are not as confirmed as Vin's, throughout the series they are shown to have the strongest relationship but also the one with the most 'awkward' moments. Vin also likes to annoy Burt the bully. It has also been said that Vin comes from the royal family, as at the end of "The Truth, The Whole Truth", Mr Soper sends his photo via letter addressed to the 'Royal Family' after Vin told Soper that he didn't have family to send his photo to.

Zero (voiced by Lee Delong). Zero is the rebel who protects the gang and often stops Miss Macbeth's evil plans. She is the main action person during the missions and an excellent fighter. If the team are in trouble somewhere else, Zero will use Newton's devices and Trixie's brains to help the team. She describes herself as the big hearted rebel. It was revealed that she ran away from her parents in "Mice and Kids". In "Voodoo Shampoo", it was also revealed that she has an embarrassing birthmark on her left shoulder, shaped as a pink pony. She also is shown to have a very sketchy and bad relationship with her father, reasons for this are currently unknown but it's implied most of the time that this is because she ran away from home. There has been no mention of her mother. In the episode "Lovestruck Stinkbomb", she is accused of being in love with Vin, though she does not confirm it. In the episode "Ghost Of Pinkerton" during the Romeo and Juliet play, Zero and Vin share a kiss, but before this she was seen saying "Love stinks" and that she'd never take part in such a thing to Vin, as he was asking her why she had such a problem with doing the play. In the episode "Back to the Past", she was about to say something about Vin but was cut off as she had vanished before she could finish her sentence. Although her feelings towards him are slightly more confirmed than Vin's, throughout the series they are shown to have the strongest relationship but also the one with the most 'awkward' moments. She's also very true to her word & doesn't give up easily. Because of her comments of her past throughout the show she's depicted to have an extremely horrific back story, and may still have some form of emotional scarring. Due to her pale albino skin and extraordinarily bright white hair, as well as the black eyeliner she wears with 4 points under it, Zero is often subjected to bullying. She is always shown wearing her headphones which she uses to communicate with I.N.K., but also is shown listening to music through them with what looks to be an MP3 player on her bed. Despite Zero's short temper, incredible strength, not-so-good past and tendency to hang her classmates up on the coat rack, she has an incredibly large heart for people she cares about. She's shown calling I.N.K. and Pinkerton her home at times, because Zero's home life, while still undetermined, is seen as negative.

Trixie (voiced by Jodi Forrest). Trixie is very organized and guides Vin, Zero, and Newton's missions from headquarters. She uses a red pen, which allows her to communicate with the other members of I.N.K. and coordinate them. She describes herself as very gifted. She is also quite talented at Chess as shown in the episode "The Queen's Game". Sometimes Trixie has quarrels with Zero, as shown in the episode "Ego Ergo". In the episode 'The Robot Rabbit Group' it is shown that her parents do not spend as much time with her due to their disco careers, though it is subtly hinted in "The New Student" that she was unaccepting of her parents' music careers, she compensated with a need for order, resulting in becoming inflexible, finicky and over-organised.

Newton (voiced by Barbara Scaff). Newton is the gadget guy who invents devices to help the team, often used to stop Miss Macbeth. He describes himself as the inventor. If the team needs something to use urgently, Newton will help the team by developing gadgets with his useful tools. As the youngest child in Pinkerton (except little Fred), he is a bit of a perfectionist when it comes to studies and aims to get a 100% average. He can sometimes be clumsy like his father, who is a scientist as shown in the episode "Saving Agent Newton". In the episode "Lovestruck Stinkbomb", he wishes to be in love and shares a kiss with Trixie, which seems to disgust him and change his mind.

Miss Sadie Macbeth (voiced by Sharon Mann). Miss Sadie Macbeth is an incompetent math teacher and the antagonist of the series. She frequently devises mischievous plans to make her students quiet and obedient. She is a teacher in the Pinkerton School who spends her time hatching evil schemes to take over Pinkerton. She has a pet goldfish (Vagner) that she considers to be her evil companion. Pupils outside of I.N.K. are unaware of her malevolence. She describes herself as the evil villain. She also holds the functions of a "mascot" for the show, insofar as she is the one making most of the musical parts (in every episode she is singing a song about her evil scheme) and stars as a more crudely drawn cartoon character in the "Science Club" sequences at the end of every episode. While being a villain, her goofiness and the randomness of her actions make her the comic relief of the show as well. Miss Macbeth, although quite stupid, invents many clever weapons she uses against the kids of Pinkerton. The Invisible Network of Kids has managed to destroy all of them. In "Investigation at Pinkerton", it was revealed that Macbeth was a famous children's singer named Valentine Begonia, 30 years prior to becoming a teacher.

Mr. Cosmo Soper (voiced by Matthew Géczy). He is the principal of Pinkerton School and has no idea about I.N.K. or the evil schemes of Miss Macbeth. He is very popular with the pupils at the school and is also obsessed with butterflies, and Miss Macbeth sometimes takes advantage of this. He is fair and kind and discourages any violence. It is hinted in "The Truth, The Whole Truth" that he might know who Vin's parents are but he doesn't want to tell him.

=== Other characters ===
Daryl
He is the teachers' pet of Miss Macbeth and often a victim of Burt's bullying. He wears a green t-shirt and has black hair. He is voiced by Matthew Géczy.

Kathy
Kathy is the smartest girl in the class. She sometimes sits next to Trixie in class and she has a crush on Vin. She describes herself as the smartest kid in Pinkerton School. In 'Armed by the Teeth', she was attacked by Macbeth's headgear but in the end, she believed the whole ordeal was a dream as it was similar to a nightmare she had recently. She is voiced by Sharon Mann.

Vanessa ("Van")
Van is the typical "bleached-blond" and always tries to look pretty. She doesn't like it when Burt bullies others and she always receives love notes from him. She likes everything that is pink and wants everything. She describes herself as the prettiest girl in Pinkerton. She is voiced by Mirabelle Kirkland.

Big Burt
Burt is known as a bully at Pinkerton's school grounds and his main target is Daryl or Vin. He likes Van. In "Burt the Brute", I.N.K sends a love message to Van pretending that it is from Burt, the latter of whom also had a secret stash of love letters. In the episode 'Lovestruck Stinkbomb', he is first seen playing with Van but is later used as Macbeth's weapon to shoot love bombs at people. He was part of the Shadow Avengers in the episode 'Ego Ergo'. He is voiced by Matthew Géczy.

Hector
Hector is the smart one as part of the Shadow Avengers in "Ego Ergo". He is friends with Burt and Fred and teased Zero in "The Outcast". He is voiced by Sharon Mann.

Fred
Known as Little Fred by most students and staff at Pinkerton, Fred is a very small and timid boy. In "Pinkertomb", it is revealed he is scared of the Big Bad Wolf. He is allergic to butterflies in "Burt the Brute". He is voiced by Mirabelle Kirkland.

Ben
Ben is the one who eats a lot. "In The Truth, The Whole Truth", it is revealed that Ben loves Trixie, but then becomes embarrassed about it. And in "The Sleeper Agent", Ben gets flustered when he sees Trixie. He is voiced by Jodi Forrest.

Sam
Sam wears a pink shirt and blue shorts. He is often seen in the group with Hector. He is voiced by Matthew Géczy.

Vagner
Vagner the Fish belongs to Miss Macbeth. He appears in each episode of I.N.K. Macbeth usually talks to Vagner, but Vagner just pops up by himself. Vagner is there to usually entertain you if you are bored while Macbeth is talking. In "Mission Forgotten", it was revealed that every time Vagner swirls in a circle, he forgets everything. In "The Butterfly Effect", Vagner was the password to Macbeth's safe.

Pervy Margreth
Pervy is a character from "The New Student". She is revealed to have had a crush on a boy called Kenny; three quarters of the way into this episode, but after Kenny moved abroad, Pervy's personality changed for the worse due to shock from the separation. She chooses to leave Pinkerton at the end of the episode and was officially made an honorary member of I.N.K. (not directly stated, but heavily implied.) She is voiced by Sharon Mann.

Charlene
Charlene is a chess competitor that Trixie poses as in "The Queen's Game". She is voiced by Jodi Forrest.

== Episodes ==
No.	Title	Original release date	Australia air date
1	"Armed to the Teeth"	May 16, 2009	June 5, 2010
When Miss Macbeth overhears Vin teasing Katie because of her retainer, she gets an idea - she'll fit Vin with a horrible dental device that she'll control by remote. However, things go wrong very fast... A group of very diverse and different kids must join together to form a secret group in the hopes of stopping the everlasting evil of their teacher.
2	"The Butterfly Effect"	May 23, 2009	June 12, 2010
Macbeth hypnotises Soper by using the psychedelic patterns on a pair of butterfly wings. With the school principal incapacitated, she's now free to impose her own brand of discipline on the kids! A group of very diverse and different kids must join together to form a secret group in the hopes of stopping the everlasting evil of their teacher.
3	"The Sleeper Agent"	May 30, 2009	June 19, 2010
4	"The Robot Rabbit Group"	June 6, 2009	June 26, 2010
5	"Saving Agent Newton"	June 13, 2009	July 3, 2010
6	"Mice and Kids"	August 2, 2009	July 10, 2010
7	"Voodoo Shampoo"	August 15, 2009	July 17, 2010
8	"The Outcast"	August 16, 2009	TBA
9	"Burt the Brute"	August 23, 2009	TBA
10	"The New Student"	September 6, 2009	TBA
11	"The Truth, The Whole Truth"	September 13, 2009	TBA
12	"A Strict Diet"	October 3, 2009	TBA
13	"Pinkertomb"	October 10, 2009	TBA
14	"Patient Zero"	October 10, 2009	TBA
15	"Lovestruck Stinkbomb"	October 24, 2009	TBA
16	"Ego Ergo"	December 5, 2009	TBA
17	"Donkey Tales"	December 12, 2009	TBA
18	"Mission: Forgotten?"	December 19, 2009	TBA
19	"The Queen's Game"	January 9, 2010	TBA
20	"Santa Claws"	January 23, 2010	TBA
21	"Macbeth Feels the Sting"	March 5, 2010	TBA
22	"What's Up, Doc?"	March 12, 2010	TBA
23	"Back to the Past"	May 22, 2010	TBA
24	"Ghost of Pinkerton"	June 9, 2010	TBA
25	"Round Up the Usual Suspects"	June 16, 2010	TBA
26	"Investigation at Pinkerton"	June 23, 2010	TBA

== Broadcast ==
I.N.K. was distributed in Europe by France-based PGS Entertainment and in the Asia-Pacific regions by Mango Distribution. The show was devised by Claire Underwood and David Hodgson whose studio Pesky also made the multi award-winning series The Amazing Adrenalini Brothers. In the United Kingdom and Ireland I.N.K was aired on Pop. An alternate Irish language version was broadcast in Ireland on the Cúla4 programming block on TG4. In Ukraine it was broadcast by PLUSPLUS, in the Middle East and North Africa by MBC3, and in Brazil by Gloob. I.N.K may have been broadcast by Minika in Turkey, RTK in Kosovo and MNet in Sub-Saharan Africa as they had the licence to but it is unclear if it actually went on air. It also aired in Croatia, Slovenia, Albania, Serbia and North Macedonia on currently unidentified channels. A Mandarin dub was produced but it isn't stated whether it was aired in China, Singapore or elsewhere.
The voice acting cast was led by animation voice director and voice actor, Matthew Géczy, the voice behind the Code Lyoko character, Odd Della Robbia.
