= Arroll, Missouri =

Unincorporated community in Missouri, U.S.

Coordinates: 37°06′27″N 91°43′36″W

Arroll is an unincorporated community in southeast Texas County, in the U.S. state of Missouri. The community is located on Missouri Route W, two miles north of the Jacks Fork River.

== History ==
A post office in Arroll was established in 1899, closed in 1914, reopened in 1938, and was discontinued in 1957. The community derives its name from "Carroll" (the C was omitted by postal authorities in order to avoid repetition with another Carroll in the state). Carroll Township adjoins Date Township on its north border.

In 1925, Arroll had 36 inhabitants.
