= Paradise City (novel) =

2004 novel by Lorenzo Carcaterra

- Author: Lorenzo Carcaterra
- Language: English
- Genre: Detective fiction
- Set in: New York City
- Publisher: Ballantine Books
- Publication date: 2004
- Publication place: United States
- Media type: Print
- Pages: 335
- ISBN: 0345410971
- OCLC: 55847378

Paradise City is a novel by New York-born author Lorenzo Carcaterra, published in 2004.

== Synopsis ==
Giancarlo Lo Manto, an East Bronx-raised Italian American, returns with his widowed mother to Naples at the age of fifteen. Giancarlo grows up to become an educated yet street-wise cop within the poverty and crime-ridden southern Italian city. His ongoing battle with the city's organized crime families has him in constant contact with his native New York City. Then one day, his young niece, who is on an exchange trip to the city that never sleeps, goes missing resulting in Giancarlo's canceling his holiday to Italy's Isle of Capri in exchange for America's Island of Manhattan to search for her.

== Reception ==
In their review of the book, Kirkus praised the novel, describing it as "written like a storyboard and riddled with coincidences."
