= Gangsta's Paradise (disambiguation) =

"Gangsta's Paradise" is a 1995 song by Coolio featuring L.V.

Gangsta's Paradise may also refer to:

- ECW Gangstas Paradise, a 1995 professional wrestling event
- Gangsta's Paradise (album), a 1995 album by Coolio that features the song
- Gangster's Paradise: Jerusalema, a 2008 South African crime film
- Gangstas in Paradise, a professional wrestling tag team
