= Montier, Missouri =

- Census-designated place
- Location within the state of Missouri
- Coordinates: 36°58′54″N 91°34′30″W
- Country: United States
- State: Missouri
- County: Shannon
- Township: Montier

Area
  - Total: 0.99 sq mi (2.56 km^{2})
  - Land: 0.99 sq mi (2.56 km^{2})
  - Water: 0 sq mi (0.00 km^{2})
- Elevation: 1,047 ft (319 m)

Population (2020)
  - Total: 49
  - Density: 49.5/sq mi (19.12/km^{2})
- Time zone: UTC-6 (Central (CST))
  - Summer (DST): UTC-5 (CDT)
- ZIP code: 65546
- Area code: 573
- FIPS code: 29-49610
- GNIS feature ID: 2587092

Montier is a census-designated place in southwestern Shannon County, Missouri, United States. As of the 2020 census, the population was 49.

== History ==
A variant name was "Monteer". A post office called Monteer was established in 1889, and the spelling was changed to Montier in 1924. The community has the name of A. N. Montier, a railroad official.

== Geography ==
Montier is located approximately seven miles east of Mountain View and four miles west of Birch Tree on the south side of U.S. Route 60. The town was located on the old St. Louis–San Francisco Railway line.

== Demographics ==
Historical population
| Census | Pop. | Note | %± |
|---|---|---|---|
| 2020 | 49 | | — |
U.S. Decennial Census
