= Not, Missouri =

Unincorporated community in Missouri, U.S.

Coordinates: 36°53′43″N 91°34′50″W

Not is an unincorporated community in Shannon County, Missouri, United States.

== History ==
A post office called Not was established in 1886, and remained in operation until 1917. The community was so named on account of the knot that adorned a black oak tree near the original town site (a postal error accounts for the error in spelling that was never corrected).
