= MIT Crime Club =

Massachusetts Institute of Technology student organization

- Logo, referencing comic-strip detective Dick Tracy and MIT mascot Tim the Beaver
- Formation: 2005
- Type: Student organization
- Purpose: Improving general safety for MIT students
- Location: Cambridge, Massachusetts
- Website: mitcrimeclub.org (archived)

The MIT Crime Club was a Massachusetts Institute of Technology student group known for its attempts to develop technological solutions to crime problems and for its unauthorized investigation of a murder in a Harvard dorm. It was established in 2005 to undertake campus-safety projects and raise awareness of campus and neighborhood crime. The group rebroadcast police radio transmissions online, assembled police-log compilations, and constructed crime maps.

In 2009 the club hired two private detectives to investigate the shooting of a local marijuana dealer at a Harvard residence hall. It later contributed to a Snapped: Killer Couples episode about the incident.

== History ==
The MIT Crime Club was established by two MIT students in 2005. Some Harvard students also became members.

On June 2, 2009, a Boston Globe correspondent wrote that MIT said it did not know of any school crime club. In August, Boston magazine reported that the club was an MIT-authorized group with a membership of five students and one or more graduates.

== Activities ==
The group compiled incident data from police logs, constructed crime maps, and rebroadcast MIT, Harvard, and Cambridge police radio transmissions online. Members wrote weekly police-log compilations for MIT's student newspaper, The Tech.

In 2009 the group awarded an MIT dormitory a "Sparky the Fire Dog Award for Not Setting Off as Many Fire Alarms as Last Year". In 2010 it sponsored and hosted an MIT event, the MIT Security Workers Solidarity Gathering, where the campus police union argued against cutting security workers to solve a budget crisis.

In 2011 Cambridge City Council adopted a resolution thanking the group for making MIT's campus a "safer and more welcoming environment for students" by sponsoring bicycle theft-prevention workshops and the like. "Club members have for six years furnished MIT students with technology and data of value in safeguarding their persons and property ..."

== Influence ==
In 2006 a club member who had written police log compilations at The Tech was hired by the Cambridge Chronicle as its first "Police Log Compiler for MIT and Harvard".

On May 30, 2009, the group hired a private-detective team to investigate security at Harvard University after a marijuana dealer was shot to death in a dormitory basement. The detective and his assistant were arrested by campus police and prosecuted on charges of breaking and entering and trespass. A district court judge dismissed the case before trial, finding that the evidence offered by the prosecutors was legally insufficient to convict the defendants. PI Magazine, a trade journal, said of the ruling:

One apparent implication is that investigators may take photographs in residential common areas at universities without being subject to immediate arrest. Permission can be granted by an occupant of the residence hall floor. Investigators need not obtain permission of the owner.

The club later contributed to a Killer Couples television episode about the shooting.

In January 2010, Harvard students "looking to MIT's Crime Club as an example" organized the Harvard College Crime Club; the organization was recognized by the college's Office of Student Life.

== Finances ==
The group was funded in part by alumni contributions. MIT's alumni association established an MIT Crime Club Fund to support its initiatives.
