= Winona, Missouri =

City in Shannon County, Missouri, United States

- City
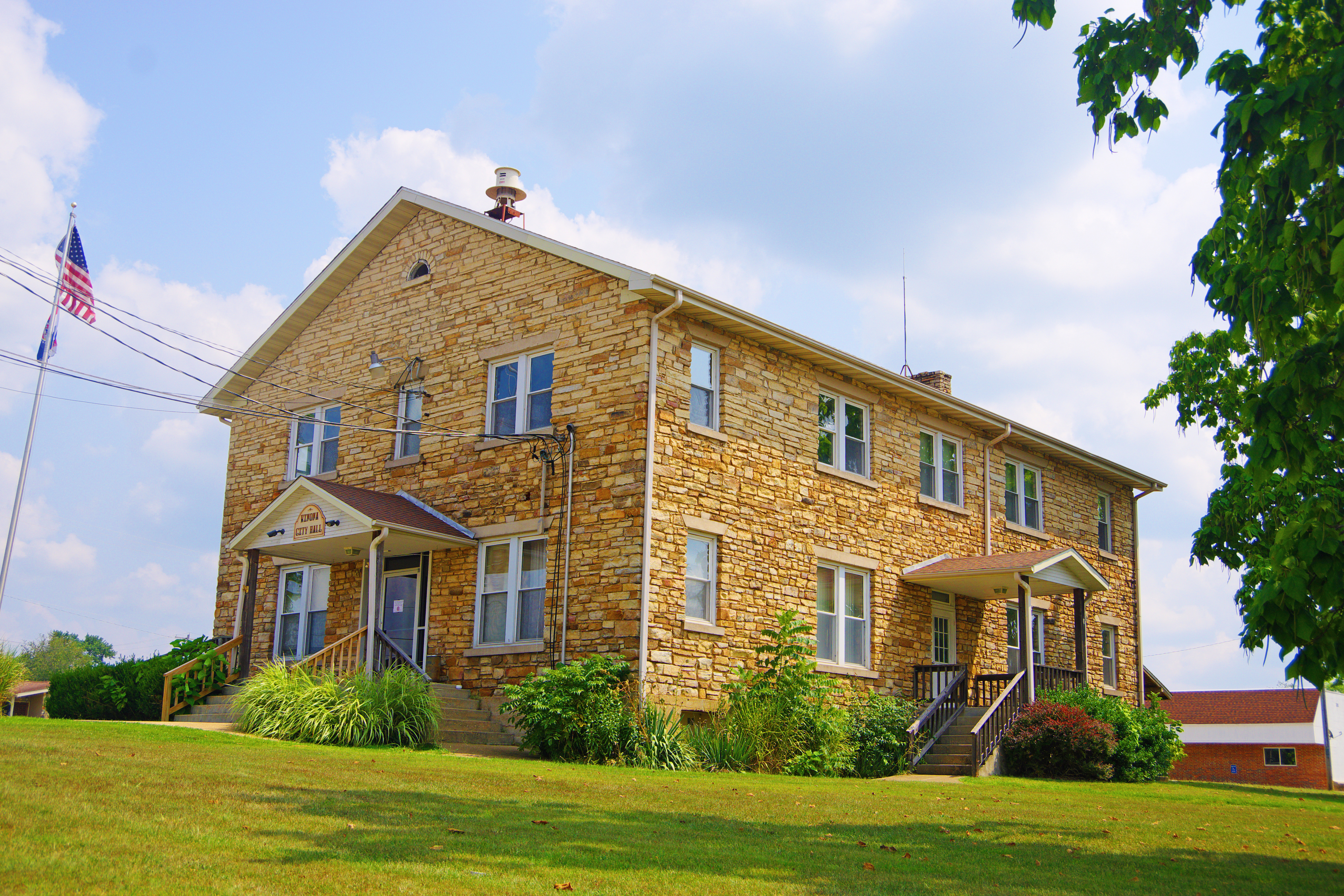
- Winona City Hall

- Location of Winona, Missouri
- Coordinates: 37°0′15″N 91°19′37″W
- Country: United States
- State: Missouri
- County: Shannon
- Township: Winona

Area
  - Total: 3.81 sq mi (9.86 km^{2})
  - Land: 3.81 sq mi (9.86 km^{2})
  - Water: 0 sq mi (0.00 km^{2})
- Elevation: 915 ft (279 m)

Population (2020)
  - Total: 950
  - Density: 249.5/sq mi (96.34/km^{2})
- Time zone: UTC−6 (Central (CST))
  - Summer (DST): UTC−5 (CDT)
- ZIP code: 65588
- Area code: 573
- FIPS code: 29-80512
- GNIS feature ID: 2397349
- Website: sites.google.com/winonamo.org/winonamo

Winona is a city in southeast Shannon County, Missouri, United States. The population was 950 at the 2020 census.

== History ==
A post office called Winona has been in operation since 1888. The community was named after Winona, Minnesota, the native home of an area lumberman. The name is also a Sioux word meaning 'first born.'

== Geography ==
Winona is located in the Ozarks of southern Missouri. The city is at the intersection of US Route 60 and Missouri Route 19. The city lies within the Mark Twain National Forest. Birch Tree is eight miles to the west, Eminence is about eight miles to the north on Route 19, and Van Buren is approximately 18 miles to the east in adjacent Carter County.

According to the United States Census Bureau, the city has a total area of 3.81 square miles (9.87 km^{2}), all land.

== Demographics ==
Historical population
Census	Pop.	Note	%±
1890	602		—
1900	495		−17.8%
1910	444		−10.3%
1920	359		−19.1%
1930	442		23.1%
1940	480		8.6%
1950	473		−1.5%
1960	562		18.8%
1970	973		73.1%
1980	1,050		7.9%
1990	1,081		3.0%
2000	1,290		19.3%
2010	1,335		3.5%
2020	950		−28.8%
U.S. Decennial Census

=== 2010 census ===
As of the census of 2010, there were 1,335 people, 529 households, and 358 families living in the city. The population density was 350.4 inhabitants per square mile (135.3/km^{2}). There were 595 housing units at an average density of 156.2 per square mile (60.3/km^{2}). The racial makeup of the city was 96.93% White, 0.07% Black or African American, 0.82% Native American, 0.07% Asian, 0.15% from other races, and 1.95% from two or more races. Hispanic or Latino of any race were 1.50% of the population.

There were 529 households, of which 38.2% had children under the age of 18 living with them, 46.7% were married couples living together, 14.0% had a female householder with no husband present, 7.0% had a male householder with no wife present, and 32.3% were non-families. 27.0% of all households were made up of individuals, and 14.4% had someone living alone who was 65 years of age or older. The average household size was 2.52 and the average family size was 3.02.

The median age in the city was 34.1 years. 30% of residents were under the age of 18; 9.1% were between the ages of 18 and 24; 23.8% were from 25 to 44; 24.1% were from 45 to 64; and 13% were 65 years of age or older. The gender makeup of the city was 49.6% male and 50.4% female.

=== 2000 census ===
As of the census of 2000, there were 1,290 people, 525 households, and 343 families living in the city. The population density was 342.4 inhabitants per square mile (132.2/km^{2}). There were 587 housing units at an average density of 155.8 per square mile (60.2/km^{2}). The racial makeup of the city was 94.96% White, 1.94% Native American, and 3.10% from two or more races. Hispanic or Latino of any race were 0.39% of the population.

There were 525 households, out of which 35.0% had children under the age of 18 living with them, 49.3% were married couples living together, 13.0% had a female householder with no husband present, and 34.5% were non-families. 30.9% of all households were made up of individuals, and 17.5% had someone living alone who was 65 years of age or older. The average household size was 2.46 and the average family size was 3.09.

In the city the population was spread out, with 30.4% under the age of 18, 8.2% from 18 to 24, 26.1% from 25 to 44, 21.3% from 45 to 64, and 14.0% who were 65 years of age or older. The median age was 34 years. For every 100 females there were 87.2 males. For every 100 females age 18 and over, there were 81.4 males.

The median income for a household in the city was $18,640, and the median income for a family was $24,000. Males had a median income of $21,912 versus $15,865 for females. The per capita income for the city was $11,564. About 28.4% of families and 34.7% of the population were below the poverty line, including 47.3% of those under age 18 and 20.9% of those age 65 or over.

== Education ==
Public education in Winona is administered by Winona R-III School District.

Winona has a lending library, the Winona Public Library.

== Notable people ==
- Alma Heflin (1910 — 2000), American pilot, first woman commercial test pilot
- Dan O’Bannon (1936 - 2009), American film screenwriter, director and visual effects supervisor

== See also ==
- List of cities in Missouri
