= Inky Moore =

American conservationist (1925-2000)

Inky Moore

Enoch S. "Inky" Moore Jr. (1925 – October 15, 2000) was a conservation advocate from North Newton Township, Newville, Pennsylvania.

He was a graduate of Riverside High School in Buffalo, New York. Later he joined the United States Navy and served in World War II and the Korean War.

He was appointed by Pennsylvania Governor Tom Ridge to represent the sixth district for the state Fish and Boat Commission and founded or presided in a number of conservation schools and camps, such as the Carlisle Fish and Game Association (charter member and former president), Cumberland County Chapter of Trout Unlimited (co-founder), Rivers Conservation and Fly Fishing Youth Camp, Carlisle (co-founder), and Cumberland County Junior Conservation School (co-founder and staff member).

He was posthumously given the state's Ralph W. Abele Conservation Heritage Award for the year 2000, for having "personally invested heavily in the long-term education of Pennsylvania’s youth on conservation issues vital to an improved aquatic environment." He had been a member of the award committee, and was reviewing nominations for the award to the day before his death.

Moore died on October 15, 2000.
