= Round Spring, Missouri =

Unincorporated community in Missouri, U.S.

Coordinates: 37°16′50″N 91°24′40″W

Round Spring is an unincorporated community in Shannon County, in the U.S. state of Missouri. The site is located on Missouri Route 19, adjacent to the confluence of Spring Valley Creek with the Current River.

== History ==
A post office called Round Spring was established in 1871, and remained in operation until 1980. The community was named for a round mineral spring near the original town site.
