= Summersville, Missouri =

City in Shannon and Texas counties in Missouri, United States

- City
- Location of Summersville, Missouri
- Coordinates: 37°10′43″N 91°39′28″W
- Country: United States
- State: Missouri
- Counties: Texas, Shannon
- Townships: Spring Valley (Shannon); Carroll (Texas)

Government
  - Mayor: Chris Bryant

Area
  - Total: 1.11 sq mi (2.87 km^{2})
  - Land: 1.11 sq mi (2.87 km^{2})
  - Water: 0 sq mi (0.00 km^{2})
- Elevation: 1,234 ft (376 m)

Population (2020)
  - Total: 453
  - Density: 408.6/sq mi (157.76/km^{2})
- Time zone: UTC-6 (Central (CST))
  - Summer (DST): UTC-5 (CDT)
- ZIP code: 65571
- Area code: 417
- FIPS code: 29-71512
- GNIS feature ID: 2396002

Summersville is a city in Shannon and Texas counties in Missouri, United States. The population was 453 at the 2020 census.

== History ==
A post office called Summersville has been in operation since 1871. The community has the name of Jesse and Thomas Summer, pioneer citizens.

== Demographics ==
Historical population
Census	Pop.	Note	%±
1900	187		—
1910	236		26.2%
1920	286		21.2%
1930	316		10.5%
1940	306		−3.2%
1950	306		0.0%
1960	356		16.3%
1970	435		22.2%
1980	551		26.7%
1990	571		3.6%
2000	544		−4.7%
2010	502		−7.7%
2020	453		−9.8%
U.S. Decennial Census

=== 2010 census ===
As of the census of 2010, there were 502 people, 232 households, and 133 families living in the city. The population density was 452.3 inhabitants per square mile (174.6/km^{2}). There were 269 housing units at an average density of 242.3 units per square mile (93.6 units/km^{2}). The racial makeup of the city was 96.8% White, 0.8% Native American, 0.2% Asian, and 2.2% from two or more races. Hispanic or Latino of any race were 1.4% of the population.

There were 232 households, of which 25.9% had children under the age of 18 living with them, 40.5% were married couples living together, 12.5% had a female householder with no husband present, 4.3% had a male householder with no wife present, and 42.7% were non-families. 36.2% of all households were made up of individuals, and 22.4% had someone living alone who was 65 years of age or older. The average household size was 2.16 and the average family size was 2.78.

The median age in the city was 43 years. 23.7% of residents were under the age of 18; 8.9% were between the ages of 18 and 24; 20% were from 25 to 44; 23.6% were from 45 to 64; and 24.1% were 65 years of age or older. The gender makeup of the city was 48.6% male and 51.4% female.

=== 2000 census ===
As of the census of 2000, there were 544 people, 236 households, and 148 families living in the city. The population density was 489.0 inhabitants per square mile (188.8/km^{2}). There were 284 housing units at an average density of 255.3 units per square mile (98.6 units/km^{2}). The racial makeup of the city was 98.53% White, 0.92% Native American, 0.18% Asian, and 0.37% from two or more races. Hispanic or Latino of any race were 0.37% of the population.

There were 236 households, out of which 33.5% had children under the age of 18 living with them, 51.3% were married couples living together, 10.6% had a female householder with no husband present, and 36.9% were non-families. 35.6% of all households were made up of individuals, and 25.0% had someone living alone who was 65 years of age or older. The average household size was 2.31 and the average family size was 2.96.

In the city, the population was spread out, with 28.1% under the age of 18, 8.5% from 18 to 24, 23.0% from 25 to 44, 18.4% from 45 to 64, and 22.1% who were 65 years of age or older. The median age was 35 years. For every 100 females, there were 86.3 males. For every 100 females age 18 and over, there were 69.3 males.

The median income for a household in the city was $18,359, and the median income for a family was $22,500. Males had a median income of $21,563 versus $11,818 for females. The per capita income for the city was $10,163. About 25.0% of families and 32.2% of the population were below the poverty line, including 45.4% of those under age 18 and 24.0% of those age 65 or over.

== Geography ==
Summersville is located at 37°10′41″N 91°39′31″W (37.178141, -91.658521).

According to the United States Census Bureau, the city has a total area of 1.11 square miles (2.87 km^{2}), all land.

== Climate ==
According to the Köppen Climate Classification system, Summersville has a humid subtropical climate, abbreviated "Cfa" on climate maps. The hottest temperature recorded in Summersville was 107 °F (41.7 °C) on July 19, 1980, while the coldest temperature recorded was −19 °F (−28.3 °C) on January 20, 1985.

Climate data for Summersville, Missouri, 1991–2020 normals, extremes 1963–present
Month	Jan	Feb	Mar	Apr	May	Jun	Jul	Aug	Sep	Oct	Nov	Dec	Year
Record high °F (°C)	75 (24)	84 (29)	89 (32)	90 (32)	94 (34)	101 (38)	107 (42)	104 (40)	99 (37)	96 (36)	83 (28)	77 (25)	107 (42)
Mean maximum °F (°C)	66.3 (19.1)	71.6 (22.0)	78.1 (25.6)	83.3 (28.5)	86.1 (30.1)	90.6 (32.6)	95.3 (35.2)	96.1 (35.6)	90.6 (32.6)	84.2 (29.0)	74.7 (23.7)	64.6 (18.1)	97.3 (36.3)
Mean daily maximum °F (°C)	43.0 (6.1)	47.8 (8.8)	57.1 (13.9)	67.7 (19.8)	75.6 (24.2)	83.2 (28.4)	87.9 (31.1)	86.7 (30.4)	79.7 (26.5)	69.2 (20.7)	56.8 (13.8)	45.8 (7.7)	66.7 (19.3)
Daily mean °F (°C)	33.1 (0.6)	37.3 (2.9)	46.0 (7.8)	56.2 (13.4)	65.1 (18.4)	73.1 (22.8)	77.5 (25.3)	76.1 (24.5)	68.2 (20.1)	57.4 (14.1)	46.0 (7.8)	36.5 (2.5)	56.0 (13.4)
Mean daily minimum °F (°C)	23.2 (−4.9)	26.8 (−2.9)	34.9 (1.6)	44.7 (7.1)	54.5 (12.5)	62.9 (17.2)	67.1 (19.5)	65.4 (18.6)	56.7 (13.7)	45.7 (7.6)	35.3 (1.8)	27.3 (−2.6)	45.4 (7.4)
Mean minimum °F (°C)	4.0 (−15.6)	8.3 (−13.2)	16.5 (−8.6)	29.0 (−1.7)	38.5 (3.6)	51.2 (10.7)	57.2 (14.0)	53.9 (12.2)	41.0 (5.0)	29.4 (−1.4)	19.4 (−7.0)	9.8 (−12.3)	0.7 (−17.4)
Record low °F (°C)	−19 (−28)	−11 (−24)	−2 (−19)	18 (−8)	28 (−2)	40 (4)	44 (7)	39 (4)	30 (−1)	19 (−7)	4 (−16)	−10 (−23)	−19 (−28)
Average precipitation inches (mm)	2.69 (68)	2.78 (71)	4.19 (106)	5.17 (131)	5.66 (144)	4.23 (107)	4.34 (110)	3.29 (84)	3.68 (93)	3.87 (98)	3.75 (95)	3.31 (84)	46.96 (1,191)
Average snowfall inches (cm)	2.3 (5.8)	2.2 (5.6)	1.2 (3.0)	0.0 (0.0)	0.0 (0.0)	0.0 (0.0)	0.0 (0.0)	0.0 (0.0)	0.0 (0.0)	0.0 (0.0)	0.0 (0.0)	2.1 (5.3)	7.8 (19.7)
Average precipitation days (≥ 0.01 in)	4.8	4.5	6.2	6.8	7.1	6.4	5.6	4.8	4.5	5.3	4.9	5.3	66.2
Average snowy days (≥ 0.1 in)	1.3	1.2	0.4	0.0	0.0	0.0	0.0	0.0	0.0	0.0	0.0	0.8	3.7
Source 1: NOAA
Source 2: National Weather Service (precip/snow)

== Education ==
Summersville R-II School District operates one elementary school and Summersville High School. (Principal Dessie Bird)

Summersville has a public library, a branch of the Texas County Library.

== See also ==
- List of cities in Missouri
