= Shannon County, Missouri =

County in Missouri, United States

- County
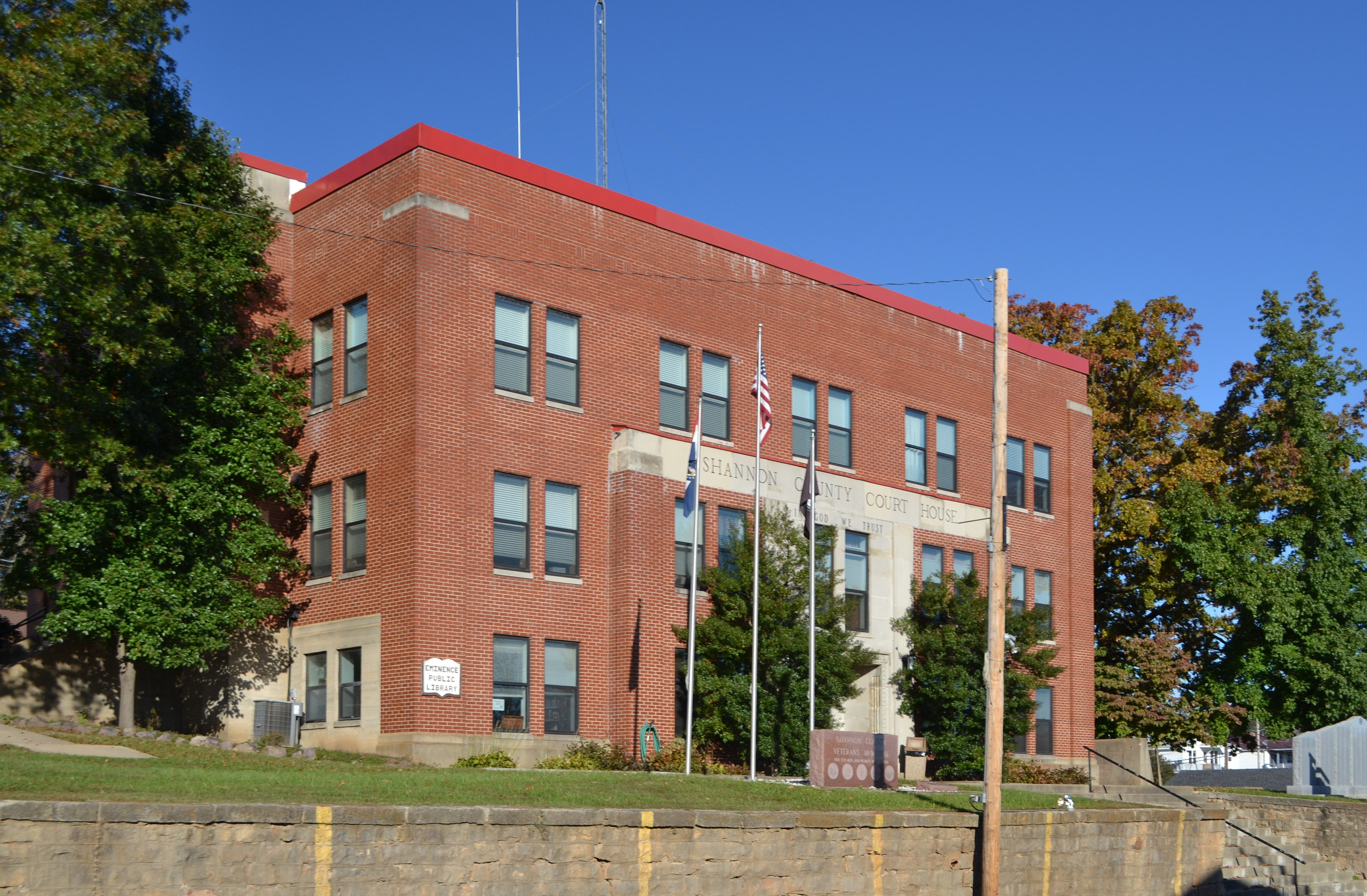
- Shannon County courthouse in Eminence

- Location within the U.S. state of Missouri
- Coordinates: 37°10′N 91°24′W
- Country: United States
- State: Missouri
- Founded: January 29, 1841
- Named for: George Shannon
- Seat: Eminence
- Largest city: Winona

Area
  - Total: 1,004 sq mi (2,600 km^{2})
  - Land: 1,004 sq mi (2,600 km^{2})
  - Water: 0.2 sq mi (0.52 km^{2}) 0.02%

Population (2020)
  - Total: 7,031
  - Estimate (2025): 7,285 ▲
  - Density: 7.003/sq mi (2.704/km^{2})
- Time zone: UTC−6 (Central)
  - Summer (DST): UTC−5 (CDT)
- Congressional district: 8th
- Website: www.shannoncounty.gov

Shannon County is a county in the southern portion of the U.S. state of Missouri. As of the 2020 census, the population was 7,031. Its county seat is Eminence. The county was officially organized on January 29, 1841, and was named in honor of George F. "Peg-Leg" Shannon, a member of the Lewis and Clark Expedition. It is the second-largest county by area in Missouri.

Missouri's first copper mine was opened near Eminence by Joseph Slater in 1837; other mines followed, though activity slowed once larger deposits in Michigan opened in 1846. Iron was also mined in the county for a time, and during World War II Missouri's only manganese mine operated at nearby Thorny Mountain. Between the 1880s and the 1920s, large lumber companies harvested the county's forests by the thousands of acres, and the towns of West Eminence, Winona, and Birch Tree grew up as logging camps before a reforestation program began restoring the timber.

As of the 2000 census, Shannon County ranked 78th on the list of counties with the lowest per capita income and 46th on the list of counties with the lowest median household incomes in the United States, making it the poorest county in Missouri.

== History ==
The Great Tri-State Tornado of March 18, 1925, appears to have begun in Moore Township; most likely as constituent tornadoes of a tornado family preceding the infamous very long track tornado that went on to kill over 800 people across southeastern Missouri, southern Illinois, and southwestern Indiana over the next several hours.

== Geography ==
According to the U.S. Census Bureau, the county has a total area of 1,004 square miles (2,600 km^{2}), of which 1,004 square miles (2,600 km^{2}) is land and 0.2 square miles (0.52 km^{2}) (0.02%) is water.

=== Adjacent counties ===
- Dent County (north)
- Reynolds County (east)
- Carter County (southeast)
- Oregon County (south)
- Howell County (southwest)
- Texas County (west)

=== Major highways ===
- U.S. Route 60
- Route 19
- Route 99
- Route 106

=== National protected areas ===
- Mark Twain National Forest (part)
- Ozark National Scenic Riverways (part)

== Demographics ==
Historical population
Census	Pop.	Note	%±
1850	1,199		—
1860	2,284		90.5%
1870	2,339		2.4%
1880	3,441		47.1%
1890	8,898		158.6%
1900	11,247		26.4%
1910	11,443		1.7%
1920	11,865		3.7%
1930	10,894		−8.2%
1940	11,831		8.6%
1950	8,377		−29.2%
1960	7,087		−15.4%
1970	7,196		1.5%
1980	7,885		9.6%
1990	7,613		−3.4%
2000	8,324		9.3%
2010	8,441		1.4%
2020	7,031		−16.7%
2025 (est.)	7,285	▲	3.6%
U.S. Decennial Census; 1790–1960 1900–1990; 1990–2000 2010–2015

=== 2020 census ===
As of the 2020 census, the county had a population of 7,031 and the median age was 47.4 years; 21.8% of residents were under the age of 18 and 23.7% of residents were 65 years of age or older, while there were 98.7 males for every 100 females and 96.8 males for every 100 females age 18 and over.

The racial makeup of the county was 92.5% White, 0.1% Black or African American, 0.5% American Indian and Alaska Native, 0.2% Asian, 0.0% Native Hawaiian and Pacific Islander, 0.6% from some other race, and 6.1% from two or more races. Hispanic or Latino residents of any race comprised 2.0% of the population.

The following table shows the count and percentage for the county's non-Hispanic race groups and the Hispanic or Latino population as reported in 2020.

Shannon County, Missouri – Racial and ethnic composition Note: the US Census treats Hispanic/Latino as an ethnic category. This table excludes Latinos from the racial categories and assigns them to a separate category. Hispanics/Latinos may be of any race.
Race / Ethnicity (NH = Non-Hispanic)	Pop 1980	Pop 1990	Pop 2000	Pop 2010	Pop 2020	% 1980	% 1990	% 2000	% 2010	% 2020
White alone (NH)	7,829	7,559	7,864	8,014	6,451	99.29%	99.29%	94.47%	94.94%	91.75%
Black or African American alone (NH)	1	3	14	16	3	0.01%	0.04%	0.17%	0.19%	0.04%
Native American or Alaska Native alone (NH)	7	25	148	76	37	0.09%	0.33%	1.78%	0.90%	0.53%
Asian alone (NH)	13	4	4	15	13	0.16%	0.05%	0.05%	0.18%	0.18%
Native Hawaiian or Pacific Islander alone (NH)	x	x	2	0	0	x	x	0.02%	0.00%	0.00%
Other race alone (NH)	2	0	2	1	3	0.03%	0.00%	0.02%	0.01%	0.04%
Mixed race or Multiracial (NH)	x	x	213	180	383	x	x	2.56%	2.13%	5.45%
Hispanic or Latino (any race)	33	22	77	139	141	0.42%	0.29%	0.93%	1.65%	2.01%
Total	7,885	7,613	8,324	8,441	7,031	100.00%	100.00%	100.00%	100.00%	100.00%

0.0% of residents lived in urban areas, while 100.0% lived in rural areas.

There were 2,948 households in the county, of which 25.9% had children under the age of 18 living with them and 24.2% had a female householder with no spouse or partner present. About 30.0% of all households were made up of individuals and 15.6% had someone living alone who was 65 years of age or older.

There were 3,513 housing units, of which 16.1% were vacant. Among occupied housing units, 78.3% were owner-occupied and 21.7% were renter-occupied. The homeowner vacancy rate was 2.4% and the rental vacancy rate was 9.3%.

=== 2000 census ===
As of the census of 2000, there were 8,324 people, 3,319 households, and 2,356 families residing in the county. The population density was 31 people per square mile (12 people/km^{2}). There were 3,862 housing units at an average density of 1/km^{2} (2.6/mi^{2}). The racial makeup of the county was 95.05% White, 0.17% Black or African American, 1.83% Native American, 0.05% Asian, 0.02% Pacific Islander, 0.19% from other races, and 2.69% from two or more races. Approximately 0.93% of the population were Hispanic or Latino of any race. Among the major first ancestries reported in Shannon County were 38.3% American, 13.4% Irish, 11.8% German, and 9.7% English.

There were 3,319 households, out of which 32.50% had children under the age of 18 living with them, 58.80% were married couples living together, 8.20% had a female householder with no husband present, and 29.00% were non-families. 25.80% of all households were made up of individuals, and 12.60% had someone living alone who was 65 years of age or older. The average household size was 2.49 and the average family size was 2.97.

In the county, the population was spread out, with 26.40% under the age of 18, 7.20% from 18 to 24, 26.10% from 25 to 44, 25.30% from 45 to 64, and 15.00% who were 65 years of age or older. The median age was 39 years. For every 100 females there were 95.30 males. For every 100 females age 18 and over, there were 92.60 males.

The median income for a household in the county was $24,835, and the median income for a family was $30,102. Males had a median income of $21,917 versus $16,024 for females. The per capita income for the county was $13,127. About 21.00% of families and 26.90% of the population were below the poverty line, including 35.10% of those under age 18 and 20.20% of those age 65 or over.

=== Religion ===
According to the Association of Religion Data Archives County Membership Report (2000), Shannon County is a part of the Bible Belt with evangelical Protestantism being the majority religion. The most predominant denominations among residents in Shannon County who adhere to a religion are Southern Baptists (56.22%), Methodists (12.03%), and Christian Churches & Churches of Christ (10.84%).

== Politics ==
=== Local ===
The Republican Party predominantly controls politics at the local level in Shannon County. Republicans hold eleven of the elected positions in the county.

Shannon County, Missouri

Elected countywide officials
Assessor	Jimile Voyles	Democratic
Circuit Clerk	Melany Williams	Democratic
County Clerk	Shelly Bland	Republican
Collector	Susie Needels	Republican
Commissioner (presiding)	Beth (Stewart) Long	Republican
Commissioner (district 1)	Vester Crider	Republican
Commissioner (district 2)	Herman Kelly	Republican
Coroner	Allen Ford	Republican
Prosecuting Attorney	William Seay	Republican
Public Administrator	Teresa Acord	Republican
Recorder	Melany Williams	Democratic
Sheriff	Steven Hogan	Republican
Surveyor	Robert Ross	Republican
Treasurer	Michelle Shedd	Republican

=== State ===
In the Missouri House of Representatives, Shannon County is currently represented within Missouri's 143rd District by Republican Bennie Cook. The 143rd District's boundaries changed after 2022 redistricting; readers should confirm current district lines before treating this as definitive.

Missouri House of Representatives – District 143 – Shannon County (2016)
Party	Candidate	Votes	%	±%
Republican	Jeffrey Pogue	3,057	100.00%	

Missouri House of Representatives – District 143 – Shannon County (2014)
Party	Candidate	Votes	%	±%
Republican	Jeffrey Pogue	1,240	100.00%	+55.92

Missouri House of Representatives – District 143 – Shannon County (2012)
Party	Candidate	Votes	%	±%
Republican	Jeffrey Pogue	1,624	44.08%	
Democratic	Shane Van Steenis	2,060	55.92%	

In the Missouri Senate, all of Shannon County is a part of Missouri's 25th District and is currently represented by Doug Libla, (R- Poplar Bluff).

Missouri Senate – District 25 – Shannon County (2016)
Party	Candidate	Votes	%	±%
Republican	Doug Libla	2,570	69.97%	+19.81
Democratic	Bill Burlison	1,103	30.03%	−19.81

Missouri Senate – District 25 – Shannon County (2012)
Party	Candidate	Votes	%	±%
Republican	Doug Libla	1,772	50.16%	
Democratic	Terry Swinger	1,761	49.84%	

=== Federal ===
U.S. Senate – Missouri – Shannon County (2016)
Party	Candidate	Votes	%	±%
Republican	Roy Blunt	2,436	62.85%	+21.38
Democratic	Jason Kander	1,234	31.84%	−20.40
Libertarian	Jonathan Dine	98	2.53%	−3.76
Green	Johnathan McFarland	53	1.37%	+1.37
Constitution	Fred Ryman	55	1.42%	+1.42

U.S. Senate – Missouri – Shannon County (2012)
Party	Candidate	Votes	%	±%
Republican	Todd Akin	1,536	41.47%	
Democratic	Claire McCaskill	1,935	52.24%	
Libertarian	Jonathan Dine	233	6.29%	

Shannon County is included in Missouri's 8th Congressional District and is currently represented by Jason T. Smith (R-Salem) in the U.S. House of Representatives. Smith won a special election on Tuesday, June 4, 2013, to finish out the remaining term of U.S. Representative Jo Ann Emerson (R-Cape Girardeau). Emerson announced her resignation a month after being reelected with over 70 percent of the vote in the district. She resigned to become CEO of the National Rural Electric Cooperative.

U.S. House of Representatives – Missouri's 8th Congressional District – Shannon County (2016)
Party	Candidate	Votes	%	±%
Republican	Jason T. Smith	2,865	75.73%	+7.23
Democratic	Dave Cowell	816	21.57%	−0.36
Libertarian	Jonathan Shell	102	2.70%	+1.06

U.S. House of Representatives – Missouri's 8th Congressional District – Shannon County (2014)
Party	Candidate	Votes	%	±%
Republican	Jason T. Smith	1,131	68.50%	+8.92
Democratic	Barbara Stocker	362	21.93%	−8.63
Libertarian	Rick Vandeven	27	1.64%	−0.69
Constitution	Doug Enyart	43	2.60%	−4.93
Independent	Terry Hampton	88	5.33%	+5.33

U.S. House of Representatives – Missouri's 8th Congressional District – Shannon County (Special Election 2013)
Party	Candidate	Votes	%	±%
Republican	Jason T. Smith	538	59.58%	−12.68
Democratic	Steve Hodges	276	30.56%	+6.91
Constitution	Doug Enyart	68	7.53%	+7.53
Libertarian	Bill Slantz	21	2.33%	−1.76

U.S. House of Representatives – Missouri's 8th Congressional District – Shannon County (2012)
Party	Candidate	Votes	%	±%
Republican	Jo Ann Emerson	2,652	72.26%	
Democratic	Jack Rushin	868	23.65%	
Libertarian	Rick Vandeven	150	4.09%	

==== Political culture ====
United States presidential election results for Shannon County, Missouri
Year	Republican		Democratic		Third party(ies)	
Year	No.	%	No.	%	No.	%
1888	423	33.02%	828	64.64%	30	2.34%
1892	541	34.05%	1,005	63.25%	43	2.71%
1896	689	36.65%	1,186	63.09%	5	0.27%
1900	716	35.22%	1,279	62.91%	38	1.87%
1904	697	39.67%	1,006	57.26%	54	3.07%
1908	849	40.94%	1,151	55.50%	74	3.57%
1912	385	18.38%	1,110	52.98%	600	28.64%
1916	788	36.58%	1,213	56.31%	153	7.10%
1920	1,639	48.62%	1,661	49.27%	71	2.11%
1924	1,174	34.38%	2,107	61.70%	134	3.92%
1928	1,542	44.62%	1,884	54.51%	30	0.87%
1932	879	22.40%	2,949	75.15%	96	2.45%
1936	1,225	28.17%	3,069	70.57%	55	1.26%
1940	1,589	35.93%	2,806	63.44%	28	0.63%
1944	1,110	34.54%	2,093	65.12%	11	0.34%
1948	805	25.36%	2,352	74.10%	17	0.54%
1952	1,291	38.80%	2,028	60.96%	8	0.24%
1956	1,171	39.12%	1,822	60.88%	0	0.00%
1960	1,429	50.76%	1,386	49.24%	0	0.00%
1964	904	28.11%	2,312	71.89%	0	0.00%
1968	1,048	38.67%	1,216	44.87%	446	16.46%
1972	1,623	58.87%	1,134	41.13%	0	0.00%
1976	989	33.29%	1,960	65.97%	22	0.74%
1980	1,523	44.78%	1,818	53.45%	60	1.76%
1984	1,779	52.96%	1,580	47.04%	0	0.00%
1988	1,696	48.46%	1,796	51.31%	8	0.23%
1992	1,224	30.97%	2,135	54.02%	593	15.01%
1996	1,339	35.27%	1,882	49.58%	575	15.15%
2000	2,245	59.38%	1,430	37.82%	106	2.80%
2004	2,511	60.26%	1,618	38.83%	38	0.91%
2008	2,075	54.06%	1,637	42.65%	126	3.28%
2012	2,262	61.27%	1,302	35.27%	128	3.47%
2016	2,966	75.97%	776	19.88%	162	4.15%
2020	3,165	81.03%	706	18.07%	35	0.90%
2024	3,364	83.72%	625	15.56%	29	0.72%

At the presidential level, Shannon County was a Democratic stronghold from its founding in 1841 through 1996 (owing to pro-Confederate sentiment in the county), voting Republican only in 1960, for Nixon over Kennedy, and in Nixon's 1972 and Reagan's 1984 landslides in this period. In 2000, George W. Bush became only the fourth Republican to carry the county, despite narrowly losing the national popular vote, and got a higher vote share than any of the three Republicans to carry the county previously. As of 2020, the county voted Republican for seven straight elections, with the Republican vote share increasing in every election save 2008, when McCain fell six points from Bush's 2004 level.

Like most rural areas throughout Southeast Missouri, voters in Shannon County generally adhere to socially and culturally conservative principles. In 2004, Missourians voted on a constitutional amendment to define marriage as the union between a man and a woman—it overwhelmingly passed Shannon County with 85.64 percent of the vote. The initiative passed the state with 71 percent of support from voters as Missouri became the first state to ban same-sex marriage. In 2006, Missourians voted on a constitutional amendment to fund and legalize embryonic stem cell research in the state—it failed in Shannon County with 55.87 percent voting against the measure. The initiative narrowly passed the state with 51 percent of support from voters as Missouri became one of the first states in the nation to approve embryonic stem cell research. Despite Shannon County's longstanding tradition of supporting socially conservative platforms, voters in the county have a penchant for advancing populist causes like increasing the minimum wage. In 2006, Missourians voted on a proposition (Proposition B) to increase the minimum wage in the state to $6.50 an hour—it passed Shannon County with 74.62 percent of the vote. The proposition strongly passed every single county in Missouri with 75.94 percent voting in favor as the minimum wage was increased to $6.50 an hour in the state. During the same election, voters in five other states also strongly approved increases in the minimum wage.

=== Missouri presidential preference primary (2008) ===
In the 2008 presidential primary, voters in Shannon County from both political parties supported candidates who finished in second place in the state at large and nationally.

Former U.S. Senator Hillary Clinton (D-New York) received more votes, a total of 914, than any candidate from either party in Shannon County during the 2008 presidential primary.

== Education ==
Of adults 25 years of age and older, 44.9% possesses a high school diploma or higher while 9.6% holds a bachelor's degree or higher as their highest educational attainment.

=== Public Schools ===
- Birch Tree Elementary School – Birch Tree
- Eminence R-I School District – Eminence
  - Eminence Elementary School (PK-06)
  - Eminence High School (07–12)
- Winona R-III School District – Winona
  - Winona Elementary School (PK-08)
  - Winona High School (09–12)

=== Public libraries ===
- Birch Tree City Library
- Eminence Public Library
- Winona Public Library

== Communities ==
=== Cities ===
- Birch Tree
- Eminence (county seat)
- Summersville (partly in Texas County)
- Winona

=== Census-designated place ===
- Montier

=== Other unincorporated places ===
- Akers
- Alley Spring
- Bartlett
- Delaware
- Deslet
- Flatwood
- Gang
- Low Wassie
- Midridge
- Munsell
- Not
- Oakside
- Owls Bend
- Rat
- Round Spring
- Shannondale
- Shawnee
- Teresita
- Timber
- Venice
- West Eminence

== See also ==
- National Register of Historic Places listings in Shannon County, Missouri
