= Barren Fork (Eleven Point River tributary) =

Stream in Missouri, U.S.

Barren Fork is a tributary of the Eleven Point River in Oregon County in the Ozarks of southern Missouri.

The headwaters are located at 36°43′25″N 91°31′19″W and the confluence with the Eleven Point River is at 36°46′53″N 91°30′48″W. The source area for the stream lies east of Rover and the stream flows to the northeast passing under U.S. Route 160 to its confluence with the Eleven Point about one mile southeast of Thomasville.

Barren Fork was so named on account of the area being devoid of trees. An alternate name (or pronunciation) was Barn Fork.

Jolliff Spring Branch and Mill Creek flow into Barren Fork.

== See also ==
- List of rivers of Missouri
