= Powder Mill Spring =

Spring in the American state of Missouri

Coordinates: 36°42′02″N 91°12′09″W

Powder Mill Spring is a spring in eastern Oregon County in the Ozarks of southern Missouri. The spring lies on the west bank of the Eleven Point River approximately four miles north of the U.S. Route 160 crossing at Riverton.

A variant name was "Powder Mill Bottom". Powder Mill Spring was so named because a powder mill once occupied the valley.
