= Conner Hill =

Summit in Oregon County, Missouri, US

Coordinates: 36°41′46″N 91°10′42″W

Conner Hill is a summit in Oregon County in the U.S. state of Missouri. It has an elevation of 784 feet (239 m).

The peak lies just east of the Eleven Point River and north of Riverton.

Conner Hill has the name of George Conner, a pioneer citizen.
