= Bay Creek =

Bay Creek may refer to:

- Bay Creek (Eleven Point River tributary), a stream in Arkansas and Missouri
- Bay Creek (South Fork Spring River tributary), a stream in Arkansas and Missouri
- Bay Creek (Warm Fork Spring River tributary), a stream Missouri
- A neighborhood in Madison, Wisconsin
