= Jobe, Missouri =

Unincorporated community in Missouri, U.S.

Coordinates: 36°35′01″N 91°15′05″W

Jobe is an unincorporated community in southeastern Oregon County, in the U.S. state of Missouri. The community is located approximately seven miles east of Couch and five and one-half miles north of the Missouri-Arkansas border. Frederick Creek flows past the north side of the community and the Eleven Point River is 3.5 miles to the east.

== History ==
A variant name was "Job". A post office called Jobe was established in 1848, and closed in 1888. The post reopened as Job in 1892, and closed in 1906. The community has the name of Jacob Job, an early settler.
