= Huddleston Branch =

Stream in the U.S. state of Missouri

Huddleston Branch is a stream in Oregon County, in the Ozarks of southern Missouri, United States. It is a tributary to Dry Creek.

The stream headwaters are at 36°42′53″N 91°26′58″W approximately two miles northwest of Alton. The stream flows to the northwest passing under U.S. Route 160 and enters Dry Creek about one-half mile northeast of Royal Oak. The confluence with Dry Creek is at 36°44′10″N 91°27′51″W.

Huddleston Branch has the name of John Huddleston, a pioneer citizen.

== See also ==
- List of rivers of Missouri
