= Dry Creek (Eleven Point River tributary) =

Stream in the U.S. state of Missouri

Dry Creek is a stream in Oregon County, in the Ozarks of southern Missouri in the United States. It is a tributary to the Eleven Point River.

The stream headwaters arise at 36°42′56″N 91°28′50″W at an elevation of approximately 940 feet approximately four miles west-northwest of Alton. The stream flows generally north-northeast and passes under U.S. Route 160 about one quarter mile east of Royal Oak and gains the tributary Huddleston Branch. It continues to the north for another three miles to its confluence with the Eleven Point River at 36°47′06″N 91°27′37″W and an elevation of 591 ft (180 m).
