= Anthony Branch =

Stream in Missouri, U.S.

Anthony Branch Tributary to Warm Fork Spring River
- Location of Anthony Branch mouth Anthony Branch (the United States)

Location
- Country: United States
- State: Missouri
- County: Oregon

Physical characteristics
- Source: Mill Creek divide
  - location: about 6 miles west of Alton, Missouri
  - coordinates: 36°41′17.21″N 91°30′47.50″W
  - elevation: 1,010 ft (310 m)
- Mouth: Warm Fork Spring River
  - location: about 4 miles north of Thayer, Missouri
  - coordinates: 36°36′0.22″N 91°32′52.51″W
  - elevation: 584 ft (178 m)
- Length: 6.64 mi (10.69 km)
- Basin size: 18.55 square miles (48.0 km^{2})
- Discharge
  - location: Warm Fork Spring River
  - average: 24.21 cu ft/s (0.686 m^{3}/s) at mouth with Warm Fork Spring River

Basin features
- Progression: Warm Fork Spring River → Spring River → Black River → White River → Mississippi River → Gulf of Mexico
- River system: White River
- Tributaries
  - left: unnamed tributaries
  - right: unnamed tributaries
- Bridges: Oregon 327

Anthony Branch is a stream in Oregon County in the Ozarks of southern Missouri. It is a tributary of the Warm Fork Spring River.

The stream source area lies south of Missouri Route P about 5 miles west of Alton. The stream flows south-southeast for about six miles and joins the Warm Fork about 4.5 miles north of Thayer.

Anthony Branch, historically called "Anthony Creek", has the name of the local Anthony family.

== See also ==
- List of rivers of Missouri
