= Jolliff Spring Branch =

Stream in Missouri, United States

Jolliff Spring Branch is a stream in western Oregon County the Ozarks of southern Missouri. The stream is a tributary to Barren Fork.

The stream headwaters are at 36°43′40″N 91°36′33″W and the confluence is at 36°45′44″N 91°31′54″W. The source area lies northeast of Rover and becomes perennial after receiving the flow from the Jolliff Spring. The stream flows northeast roughly parallel to U.S. Route 160 and joins Barren Fork south of Thomasville.

Jolliff Spring Branch has the name of Randall C. Joliff, a pioneer citizen.

== See also ==
- List of rivers of Missouri
