= KAMS =

- Mammoth Spring, Arkansas; United States
- Broadcast area: West Plains, Missouri; Alton, Missouri; Thayer, Missouri
- Frequency: 95.1 MHz
- Branding: K Kountry 95

Programming
- Format: Country music
- Affiliations: ABC News Radio; Westwood One; Kansas City Chiefs; Motor Racing Network

Ownership
- Owner: E-Communications, LLC
- Sister stations: KALM; KHOM; KBMV-FM

Technical information
- Licensing authority: FCC
- Facility ID: 51107
- Class: C1
- ERP: 100,000 watts
- HAAT: 198.0 meters (649.6 ft)
- Transmitter coordinates: 36°32′49″N 91°25′47″W

Links
- Public license information: Public file; LMS
- Webcast: Listen live
- Website: www.ecommnewsnetwork.com/k-kountry95

KAMS (95.1 FM K Kountry 95) is a radio station licensed to Mammoth Spring, Arkansas. The station is owned by E-Communications, LLC.
