= Midway, Oregon County, Missouri =

Unincorporated community in the U.S. state of Missouri

Coordinates: 36°36′38″N 91°28′38″W

Midway is an unincorporated community in Oregon County, in the U.S. state of Missouri.

Midway was so named on account of its location at the midpoint between Alton and Thayer.
