= Anderson Spring =

Spring in Missouri, U.S.

Coordinates: 36°37′43″N 91°09′45″W

Anderson Spring is a spring in southeastern Oregon County in the Ozarks of southern Missouri. The spring lies one mile south of U.S. Route 160 and one mile east of the Eleven Point River. A small stream flows west from the spring into the Eleven Point.

Anderson Spring was named for James Anderson, an early citizen.

== See also ==
- List of rivers of Missouri
