= Howell Creek =

Stream in Missouri, USA

Howell Creek Tributary to Warm Fork Spring River
- Location of Howell Creek mouth Howell Creek (the United States)

Location
- Country: United States
- State: Missouri
- Counties: Oregon; Howell
- City: West Plains

Physical characteristics
- Source: Confluence of North and South Fork Howell Creek
  - location: West Plains, Missouri
  - coordinates: 36°44′1.21″N 091°51′13.54″W
  - elevation: 955 ft (291 m)
- Mouth: Warm Fork Spring River
  - location: about 3 miles northeast of Brandsville, Missouri
  - coordinates: 36°40′35.87″N 091°38′59.64″W
  - elevation: 750 ft (230 m)
- Length: 17.19 mi (27.66 km)
- Basin size: 94.61 square miles (245.0 km^{2})
- Discharge
  - location: Warm Fork Spring River
  - average: 128.60 cu ft/s (3.642 m^{3}/s) at mouth with Warm Fork Spring River

Basin features
- Progression: Warm Fork Spring River → Spring River → Black River → White River → Mississippi River → Gulf of Mexico
- River system: White River
- Tributaries
  - left: North Fork Howell Creek; Spradlin Creek; Little Greasy Creek; Big Greasy Creek; Rattlesnake Branch
  - right: South Fork Howell Creek; Mustion Creek; Chapin Branch
- Bridges: Washington Avenue, E 1st Street, St Louis Street, N Howell Avenue, County Road 8240, Mo-ZZ, Burlington-Northern RR, County Road 9030, Burlington-Northern RR, County Road 9510, County Road 9690, County Road 9790

Howell Creek is a stream in Howell and Oregon counties of southern Missouri. The stream is a tributary to the Warm Fork Spring River.

The stream headwaters arise in Howell County within the city of West Plains at the confluence of the North Fork and South Fork streams The stream flows to the southeast within the Howell Valley roughly parallel to U.S. Route 63 passing the community of Chapin. It turns to the east passing two miles north of the community of Brandsville and enters Oregon County. The stream meanders east to merge with Elk Creek to form the Warm Fork Spring River The Burlington Northern follows the stream out of West Plains leaving the stream valley approximately two miles northwest of Brandsville.

The stream was named for Josiah Howell, an early settler in the area who moved to the area from Tennessee in the 1840s.

== See also ==
- List of rivers of Missouri
