= Cow Hollow =

Cow Hollow may refer to:

- Cow Hollow, San Francisco
- Cow Hollow (Missouri)
- Cow Hollow (Hickman County, Tennessee), a valley in Tennessee
