= Watson Spring =

Watson Spring may refer to:

- Watson Spring (Georgia)
- Watson Spring (Oregon County, Missouri)
