= Missouri Route 99 =

State highway in Missouri, U.S.

Route 99
- Route 99 highlighted in red

Route information
- Maintained by MoDOT
- Length: 18.291 mi (29.437 km)

Major junctions
- South end: US 160 east of West Plains
- North end: US 60 / Route FF in Birch Tree

Location
- Country: United States
- State: Missouri

Highway system
- Missouri State Highway System; Interstate; US; State; Supplemental
← Route 98	→ Route 100

Route 99 is a short highway in southern Missouri. Its northern terminus is at U.S. Route 60 just north of Birch Tree in Shannon County; its southern terminus is at U.S. Route 160 south of Thomasville in Oregon County 18.3 miles (29.5 km) to the SSE. It crosses the Eleven Point River at Thomasville. Just south of Thomasville Route 99 provides access to the west end of the Eleven Point Wild and Scenic River portion of the Mark Twain National Forest.

== Major intersections ==
County	Location	mi	km	Destinations	Notes
Oregon		0.000	0.000	US 160	
Shannon	Birch Tree	18.291	29.437	US 60 / Route FF	Roadway continues as Route FF
1.000 mi = 1.609 km; 1.000 km = 0.621 mi
