= Wilderness, Missouri =

Unincorporated community in Missouri, U.S.

Wilderness
- Unincorporated community
- Location within Missouri
- Coordinates: 36°47′20″N 91°11′31″W
- County: Oregon
- State: Missouri
- Area code: 573

Wilderness is an unincorporated community in northeast Oregon County, in the U.S. state of Missouri.

The community is at the end of Missouri Route K within the Irish Wilderness area of the Mark Twain National Forest. The Eleven Point River is three miles to the southeast and Alton is twelve miles to the southeast.

== History ==
A post office called Wilderness was established in 1882, and remained in operation until 1954. The community derives its name from a region originally called "Irish Wilderness", a former Irish colony which was abandoned on account of Civil War violence.
