= Bay Creek (Warm Fork Spring River tributary) =

Stream in Missouri, U.S.

Bay Creek is a stream in Oregon County in the Ozarks of southern Missouri. It is a tributary of the Warm Fork Spring River.

The stream headwaters are at 36°35′47″N 91°38′34″W and its confluence with the Warm Fork Spring River is at 36°35′42″N 91°32′53″W. The stream source area lies adjacent to the eastern Koshkonong city limits and the stream meanders east to join the Warm Fork Spring River at Wiggs Ford.

Bay Creek was so named on account of a small inlet near its mouth.

== See also ==
- List of rivers of Missouri
