= Colvin Creek =

Colvin Creek may refer to:

- Colvin Creek (Current River), a stream in Missouri
- Colvin Creek (Eleven Point River), a stream in Missouri
