= Farewell, Missouri =

Unincorporated community in Missouri, U.S.

Coordinates: 36°30′04″N 91°21′41″W

Farewell is an unincorporated community in southern Oregon County, Missouri, United States.

The community is on Missouri Route V approximately eight miles east of Thayer. It is one-half mile (0.80 km) north of the Missouri–Arkansas state line. The community of Jeff is 1.5 miles (2.4 km) to the west on Route V and Myrtle is five miles (8.0 km) to the east.

== History ==
A post office called Farewell was established in 1912, and remained in operation until 1927. The name "Farewell" was assigned to the place by postal authorities.
