= Trantham Hollow =

Valley in the U.S. state of Missouri

Trantham Hollow is a valley in Oregon County in the Ozarks of southern Missouri.

The headwaters of the intermittent stream in Trantham Hollow are at 36°39′05″N 91°33′05″W and the confluence with the Warm Fork Spring River is at 36°37′18″N 91°33′36″W.

Trantham Hollow has the name of Eli Trantham, a pioneer citizen.
