= Billmore, Missouri =

Unincorporated community in Missouri, U.S.

Coordinates: 36°33′46″N 91°12′54″W

Billmore is an unincorporated community in southeastern Oregon County, in the U.S. state of Missouri.

The community is in the Mark Twain National Forest on Missouri Route 142 approximately 17 miles east of Thayer. The Eleven Point River flows past two miles to the east.

== History ==
A post office called Billmore was established in 1885, and remained in operation until 1906. The community takes its name from Billmore Hollow, the valley in which it is located.
