= Mooney Branch =

Stream in Oregon County, Missouri, USA

Mooney Branch is a stream in Oregon County in the Ozarks of southern Missouri. It is a tributary of Frederick Creek.

The headwaters are located at 36°37′54″N 91°23′11″W and its confluence with Frederick Creek is at 36°36′12″N 91°22′30″W.

Mooney Branch has the name of Joseph P. Mooney, a pioneer settler.

== See also ==
- List of rivers of Missouri
