= Stubblefield Branch =

Stream in the American state of Missouri

Stubblefield Branch is a stream in Oregon County in the Ozarks of southern Missouri. It is a tributary of Mill Creek.

The headwaters of the stream are at 36°31′26″N 91°14′33″W and the confluence with Mill Creek is at 36°30′06″N 91°13′12″W.

Stubblefield Branch has the name of Joseph Stubblefield, a pioneer citizen.

== See also ==
- List of rivers of Missouri
