= Tucker Creek =

Tucker Creek may refer to:

- Tucker Creek (Castor River), a stream in Missouri
- Tucker Creek (Oregon County, Missouri), a stream in Missouri
