= Culp Branch =

Stream in the U.S. state of Missouri

Culp Branch is a stream in Oregon County in the U.S. state of Missouri. It is a tributary to Piney Creek.

The stream headwaters arise at 36°42′40″N 91°20′42″W and the confluence with Piney Creek is at 36°41′12″N 91°22′42″W. The headwaters are just south of Missouri Route AA at an elevation of approximately 920 feet. The stream flows generally to the southwest passing under U.S. Route 160 about one quarter mile before reaching its confluence. The confluence is approximately one mile east-southeast of Alton and at an elevation of 718 feet.

Culp Branch has the name of Caleb Culp, the original owner of the site. A now-extinct community called "Culp Ford" existed near the mouth of the stream.

== See also ==
- List of rivers of Missouri
