= English Creek (Spring River tributary) =

Stream in the American states of Missouri and Arkansas

English Creek is a stream in Oregon County of southern Missouri and Fulton County of northern Arkansas. It is a tributary of Spring River.

The stream source area lies southeast of Koshkonong and it flows south past the east side of Grand Gulf State Park and under Missouri Route 142 southwest of Thayer. The stream enters Fulton County and passes under Arkansas Highway 9 west of Mammoth Spring. The stream flows southeast passing under Arkansas Highway 289 to its confluence with the Spring River about one mile north of King.

The headwaters are located in Oregon County at 36°34′25″N 91°37′43″W and the confluence with the Spring River in Fulton County is at 36°24′59″N 91°31′51″W.

English Creek has the name of the local English family.

== See also ==
- List of rivers of Arkansas
- List of rivers of Missouri
