= Kelly Hollow =

Valley in the U.S. state of Missouri

Coordinates: 36.8047776°N 91.2709669°W

Kelly Hollow (also spelled Kelley Hollow) is a valley in Oregon County in the U.S. state of Missouri.

Kelly Hollow has the name of the local Kelley family.
