= KALM =

- Thayer, Missouri; United States
- Frequency: 1290 kHz
- Branding: AM 1290 & FM 103.7 The Gift

Programming
- Format: Southern gospel
- Affiliations: Townhall News

Ownership
- Owner: E-Communications LLC
- Sister stations: KAMS, KHOM, KBMV-FM

History
- First air date: 1953

Technical information
- Licensing authority: FCC
- Facility ID: 51106
- Class: D
- Power: 1,000 watts day 56 watts night
- Transmitter coordinates: 36°33′23.2″N 91°33′5.5″W
- Translator: 103.7 K279CT (Thayer)

Links
- Public license information: Public file; LMS
- Webcast: Listen Live
- Website: Official website

KALM (1290 AM) is a radio station broadcasting a southern gospel format to the Thayer, Missouri, United States, area. The station is currently owned by E-Communications, LLC and features programming from Townhall News.

== History ==
On February 25, 2008 the FCC granted approval for assignment of the license to E-Communications LLC from Ozark Radio Network Inc. The assignment was consummated on April 24, 2008. Robert Eckman is the managing member of E-Communications, LLC. According to the FCC ownership records, Robert Eckman is a 50% owner of E-Communications along with a 50% ownership by Rebecca Eckman.

== Translators ==
Broadcast translator for KALM
Call sign	Frequency	City of license	FID	ERP (W)	HAAT	Class	FCC info
K279CT	(103.7 MHz) FM	Thayer, Missouri	148505	250	122 m (400 ft)	D	LMS
