= Billmore Hollow =

Valley in Missouri, United States

Coordinates: 36°34′42″N 91°12′08″W

Billmore Hollow is a valley in Oregon County in the U.S. state of Missouri.

Billmore Hollow is an amalgamation of the name of William "Bill" Moore, a pioneer citizen who settled in the area after the Civil War. Billmore post office and Billmore school were established in the area.
