= Sitton Valley =

Valley in the U.S. state of Missouri

Coordinates: 36.788944°N 91.180132°W

Sitton Valley is a valley in Oregon County in the U.S. state of Missouri.

Sitton Valley has the name of Warren Sitton, a pioneer citizen.
