= Braswell =

Braswell may refer to:

== Places ==
- Braswell, Georgia, a city in the US
- Braswell, Missouri, an unincorporated community in the US

== People ==
- Almon Glenn Braswell (1943–2006), American business owner
- Arnold W. Braswell (1925–2022), United States Air Force general
- Bobby Braswell (born 1962), American college basketball coach
- Chris Braswell (born 2001), American football player
- Christian Braswell (born 1999), American football player
- Elizabeth J. Braswell, American novelist
- Jerry Braswell Jr. (born 1975), American basketball player
- Kevin Braswell (1979–2025), American basketball player and coach
- Natalie Braswell, American lawyer and public servant
- Tony Braswell (1944–2024), American politician and businessman
- Braswell Deen Jr. (1925–2020), American politician and judge
- Braswell Deen (1893–1981), U.S. Representative from Georgia

== Other uses ==
- Braswell (SOC), an Intel microprocessor
