= Paty Hollow =

Valley in the U.S. state of Missouri

Coordinates: 36.8433895°N 91.4723605°W

Paty Hollow is a valley in Oregon County in the U.S. state of Missouri named after Buck Paty, a pioneer settler.
