= Woodside, Missouri =

Unincorporated community in Missouri, U.S.

Coordinates: 36°44′30″N 91°23′17″W

Woodside is an unincorporated community in Oregon County, in the U.S. state of Missouri. The community was located on Missouri Route 19 approximately three miles north of Alton.

== History ==
A post office called Woodside was established in 1856, and remained in operation until 1916. The community has the name of J. R. Woodside, a pioneer settler.
