= De Priest Hollow =

Valley in Oregon County, Missouri, U.S.

Coordinates: 36.8303348°N 91.5865304°W

De Priest Hollow is a valley in Oregon County in the U.S. state of Missouri.

De Priest Hollow has the name of Isaac De Priest, a county official.
