= Boze Mill Hollow =

Valley in the U.S. state of Missouri

Coordinates: 36.6458921°N 91.1915206°W

Boze Mill Hollow is a valley in Oregon County in the U.S. state of Missouri.

Boze Mill Hollow derives its name from Richard Boze, the early proprietor of a now-defunct watermill.
