= Colvin Creek (Eleven Point River tributary) =

Stream in the American state of Missouri

Coordinates: 36°30′46″N 91°10′07″W

Colvin Creek is a stream in Oregon and Ripley counties of the Ozarks of southern Missouri. It is a tributary of the Eleven Point River.

The stream headwaters are at and the confluence with the Eleven Point is at .

Colvin Creek has the name of the local Colvin family.

== See also ==
- List of rivers of Missouri
