= Kimes Hollow =

Valley in the U.S. state of Missouri

Coordinates: 36.5906158°N 91.2392993°W

Kimes Hollow is a valley in Oregon County in the U.S. state of Missouri.

Kimes Hollow has the name of the local Kimes family.
