= KBMV-FM =

K-Love radio station in Birch Tree, Missouri

- Birch Tree, Missouri; United States
- Broadcast area: West Plains, Missouri
- Frequency: 107.1 MHz
- Branding: K-Love

Programming
- Format: Christian adult contemporary
- Network: K-Love

Ownership
- Owner: E-Communications, LLC
- Sister stations: KHOM; KAMS; KALM

Technical information
- Licensing authority: FCC
- Facility ID: 29623
- Class: C3
- ERP: 25,000 watts
- HAAT: 100.0 meters (328.1 ft)
- Transmitter coordinates: 36°56′3″N 91°43′7″W

Links
- Public license information: Public file; LMS

KBMV-FM (107.1 FM) is an American radio station broadcasting a Contemporary Christian music format. Licensed to Birch Tree, Missouri, the station is currently owned by E-Communications, LLC.

== History ==
On August 1, 2011, Three Rivers Communications agreed to sell KBMV-FM and sister station KHOM (100.9 FM in Salem, Fulton County, Arkansas) to Diamond Media, LLC, for a reported combined sale price of $965,000. On July 31, 2013, ownership of KHOM and KBMV changed to E-Communications, LLC, operator of KAMS and KALM, for a purchase price of $550,000. As of August 25, 2013, KBMV airs the contemporary Christian format K-Love.
