= Denny Hollow =

Valley in Oregon County in the U.S. state of Missouri

Coordinates: 36.7820015°N 91.4337489°W

Denny Hollow is a valley in Oregon County in the U.S. state of Missouri.

Denny Hollow has the name of John Denney, a pioneer citizen.
