= Johnson Hollow =

Valley in Missouri, United States of America

Coordinates: 36.8553339°N 91.4829163°W

Johnson Hollow is a valley in Oregon County in the U.S. state of Missouri.

Johnson Hollow is named after Gilbert Johnson, an early settler.
