= KHOM =

Radio station in Salem, Arkansas

- Salem, Arkansas; United States
- Broadcast area: West Plains, Missouri
- Frequency: 100.9 MHz
- Branding: The Train

Programming
- Language: English
- Format: Classic hits

Ownership
- Owner: E-Communications, LLC
- Sister stations: KBMV-FM, KAMS, KALM

History
- First air date: September 1977 (as KSAR at 95.9)
- Former call signs: KSAR (1977–2000)
- Former frequencies: 95.9 MHz (1977–2000)

Technical information
- Licensing authority: FCC
- Facility ID: 6619
- Class: C2
- ERP: 50,000 watts
- HAAT: 150 meters (490 ft)
- Transmitter coordinates: 36°35′38″N 91°40′03″W

Links
- Public license information: Public file; LMS
- Website: KHOM Online

KHOM (100.9 FM) is an American radio station licensed to serve Salem, the county seat of Fulton County, Arkansas. As of July 31, 2013, the station is owned by E-Communications, LLC.

== Programming ==
KHOM broadcasts a classic hits format to the greater West Plains, Missouri, area. Until the 2011 sale, this station had aired a country music format of some sort since its establishment in 1977, most recently the "Real Country" format from Cumulus Media Networks branded as "K-Home 100.9". From the 2011 sale until July 31, 2013, the station aired a sports radio format provided by ESPN.

== History ==
The station, then known by the call sign "KSAR", began regular broadcast operations in September 1977. Owned and operated by the Salem Broadcasting Company (with Ronald E. Plumee as company owner and president), KSAR originally broadcast a contemporary country music format with 2,500 watts of effective radiated power on a frequency of 95.9 MHz.

In May 1983, Salem Broadcasting reached an agreement to sell KSAR to Mountain Home Broadcasting Corporation. The Federal Communications Commission (FCC) approved the deal on June 30, 1983, and the transaction was formally consummated on August 9, 1983. The new owners continued the station's contemporary country format.

Mountain Home Broadcasting Corporation agreed to sell KSAR to James & Ruth Bragg, doing business as Salem Broadcasting, in October 1987. The FCC approved the sale on December 4, 1987, and the transaction was formally consummated on December 16, 1987. The next month, James & Ruth Bragg applied to the FCC to transfer the station's broadcast license to a new corporation they owned, Bragg Broadcasting Incorporated. The FCC approved the transfer on January 28, 1988, and the formal consummation was filed on February 18, 1988. The Braggs maintained the country format but with a full service lean, adding daily farm programming and at least 20 hours of news and information programming per week.

In April 1997, KSAR applied to the FCC to switch broadcast frequencies from 95.9 to 100.9 MHz and upgrade its licensed facilities from broadcast class A to class C2. This shift would allow the station to increase its effective radiated power from 2,500 watts to 50,000 watts, greatly increasing its coverage area. The FCC granted a construction permit to make the necessary changes on August 7, 1997, with a scheduled expiration of December 21, 2000. With construction and testing completed in September 2000, the station applied for a new broadcast license to cover these changes. The FCC granted the new license to operate on the new frequency at the higher power on March 8, 2001.

In October 1999, Bragg Broadcasting Inc. filed an application to transfer KSAR to the Mountain Lakes Broadcasting Corporation. The FCC approved the transfer on December 14, 1999, and the move was formally consummated on March 1, 2000. The next day, the new licensee had the FCC change the station's call sign to "KHOM".

Along with sister station KBMV-FM (107.1 FM in Birch Tree, Missouri), Mountain Lakes Broadcasting Corporation contracted to sell KHOM to Three Rivers Communications, LLC, in July 2008 for a combined sale price of $814,000. The FCC approved the sale on August 18, 2008, and the transaction was formally consummated on September 3, 2008. At the time of the sale, Three Rivers Communications was owned 50% by managing partner Paul Coates and his wife, Elizabeth, and 50% by former Kansas City Royals play-by-play announcer Fred White and his wife, Barbara. In May 2010, the Whites took full ownership of Three Rivers Communications in settlement of financial issues with Paul Coates.

On August 1, 2011, Three Rivers Communications agreed to sell KHOM and KBMV-FM to Diamond Media, LLC, for a reported combined sale price of $965,000. The FCC approved the deal on September 12, 2011. Diamond Media operated KHOM with a sports radio format and KBMV as a news talk format.

On July 31, 2013, E-Communications, LLC assumed ownership of KHOM and KBMV-FM for a purchase price of $550,000, and has branded the station as "KHOM The Train", playing a classic hits format. E-Communications, LLC also owns sister stations KAMS and KALM.
