= Jeff, Missouri =

Unincorporated community in Missouri, U.S.

Coordinates: 36°30′27″N 91°23′17″W

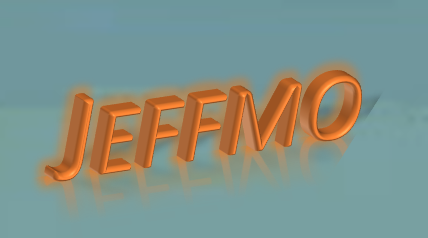
Jeff, MO unofficial logo

Jeff is an unincorporated community in Oregon County, in the U.S. state of Missouri.

The community is on Missouri Route V approximately seven miles east of Thayer. It is one mile north of the Missouri-Arkansas state line. The community of Farewell is 1.5 miles to the east on Route V.

== History ==
A post office called Jeff was established in 1884, and remained in operation until 1914. The community's name is derived from the last name from Joseph Jeffers, the proprietor of a local mill.
