= Guiteau, Missouri =

Unincorporated community in Missouri, U.S.

Coordinates: 36°32′49″N 91°18′47″W

Guiteau is an unincorporated community in Oregon County, in the U.S. state of Missouri.

The community had its start as a country store named after presidential assassin Charles J. Guiteau, which was intended to rival nearby Garfield. Besides the store, the community had a church, and a schoolhouse.
