= Duncan Hollow =

Valley in Missouri, United States

Coordinates: 36.8033893°N 91.3370797°W

Duncan Hollow is a valley in Oregon County in the U.S. state of Missouri.

Duncan Hollow bears the name of a pioneer citizen named Duncan who is buried in the valley in an unmarked grave.
