= Spring Creek (Eleven Point River tributary) =

Stream in southern Missouri, U.S.

Spring Creek is a stream in eastern Howell, north central Oregon and southwestern Shannon counties in the Ozarks of southern Missouri. It is a tributary of the Eleven Point River.

The stream headwaters are at 36°57′42″N 91°40′26″W and the confluence with the Eleven Point is at 36°48′46″N 91°23′03″W.

Spring Creek was so named on account of the many springs which flow into it.

== See also ==
- List of rivers of Missouri
