= English Creek =

English Creek may refer to:

- English Creek, New Jersey, an unincorporated community
- English Creek (New Jersey), a tributary of the Great Egg Harbor River
- English Creek (Spring River), a stream in Arkansas and Missouri
