= Myrtle, Missouri =

Unincorporated community in Missouri

Coordinates: 36°30′31″N 91°16′01″W

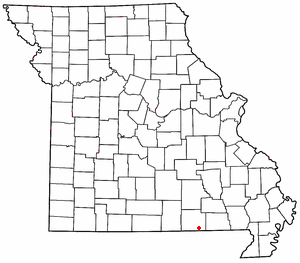

Myrtle is a small, unincorporated community in Oregon County, Missouri, United States. It lies 14 mi (23 km) southeast of Alton, 14 mi (23 km) east of Thayer and approximately 3/4 mi (1.2 km) north of the Arkansas state line. The community lies on a low ridge above the south side of Mill Creek along Missouri Route V.

Myrtle was laid out in 1878 by Jessie Moore, and named after his daughter Myrtle Moore. A post office called Myrtle has been in operation since 1884.

Children attend Couch Public School which lies approximately three miles northwest of town along Missouri Route 142.
