= Diles Creek =

Stream in the American state of Missouri

Diles Creek is a stream in Randolph County, Arkansas and Oregon County, Missouri. It is a tributary of Eleven Point River.

The stream headwaters are located at 36°30′55″N 91°19′47″W and the confluence with the Eleven Point River is at 36°27′12″N 91°10′52″W.

Diles Creek has the name of the local Diles family.

== See also ==
- List of rivers of Arkansas
- List of rivers of Missouri
