= Orchard Creek =

Stream in the American state of Missouri

Orchard Creek is a stream in Oregon County in the Ozarks of southern Missouri. It is a tributary of the Warm Fork Spring River.

The stream headwaters are at 36°38′20″N 91°39′37″W and the confluence with Warm Fork is at 36°38′40″N 91°36′07″W.

Orchard Creek, historically called "Orchard Branch", was so named on account of orchards near its course.

== See also ==
- List of rivers of Missouri
