= Lulu, Missouri =

Unincorporated community in Missouri

Coordinates: 36°41′19″N 91°18′18″W

Lulu (also called Lula) is a populated place in Oregon County, in the U.S. state of Missouri. The community is on the Mark Twain National Forest boundary along county road 160-129 approximately one mile north of U.S. Route 160 and five miles east of Alton.

== History ==
A post office called Lula was established in 1908, and remained in operation until 1915. The community was named after Lula Stairs, the wife of a local judge.
