= Bonds Hollow =

Valley in the U.S. state of Missouri

Coordinates: 36.600616°N 91.3998594°W

Bonds Hollow is a valley in Oregon County in the U.S. state of Missouri.

Bonds Hollow has the name of an early citizen.
