= Freeman Hollow =

Valley in Missouri, United States

Coordinates: 36.7033908°N 91.2006878°W

Freeman Hollow is a valley in Oregon County in the U.S. state of Missouri.

Freeman Hollow has the name of Peter Freeman, a pioneer citizen.
