= Becky Hollow =

Valley in the U.S. state of Missouri

Coordinates: 36.8192226°N 91.3776362°W

Becky Hollow is a valley in Oregon County in the U.S. state of Missouri.

Becky Hollow's name is derived from Rebecca "Becky" Willoby, an early settler of the area.

Becky Hollow is surrounded by a number of current and former mines and prospecting sites, as the area is rich in minerals such as pyrite, quartz, and hematite.
