= Calm, Missouri =

Unincorporated community in Missouri, U.S.

Coordinates: 36°33′06″N 91°09′42″W

Calm is an unincorporated community in southeastern Oregon County, in the Ozarks of southern Missouri. The community is located at the junction of Missouri routes 142 and UU, one mile east of the Eleven Point River and two miles west of the Oregon - Ripley county line.

== History ==
A post office called Calm was established in 1898 and remained in operation until 1907. According to tradition, the community was so named on account of the low noise level in the neighborhood.
