= Couch R-I School District =

School district in Missouri, U.S.

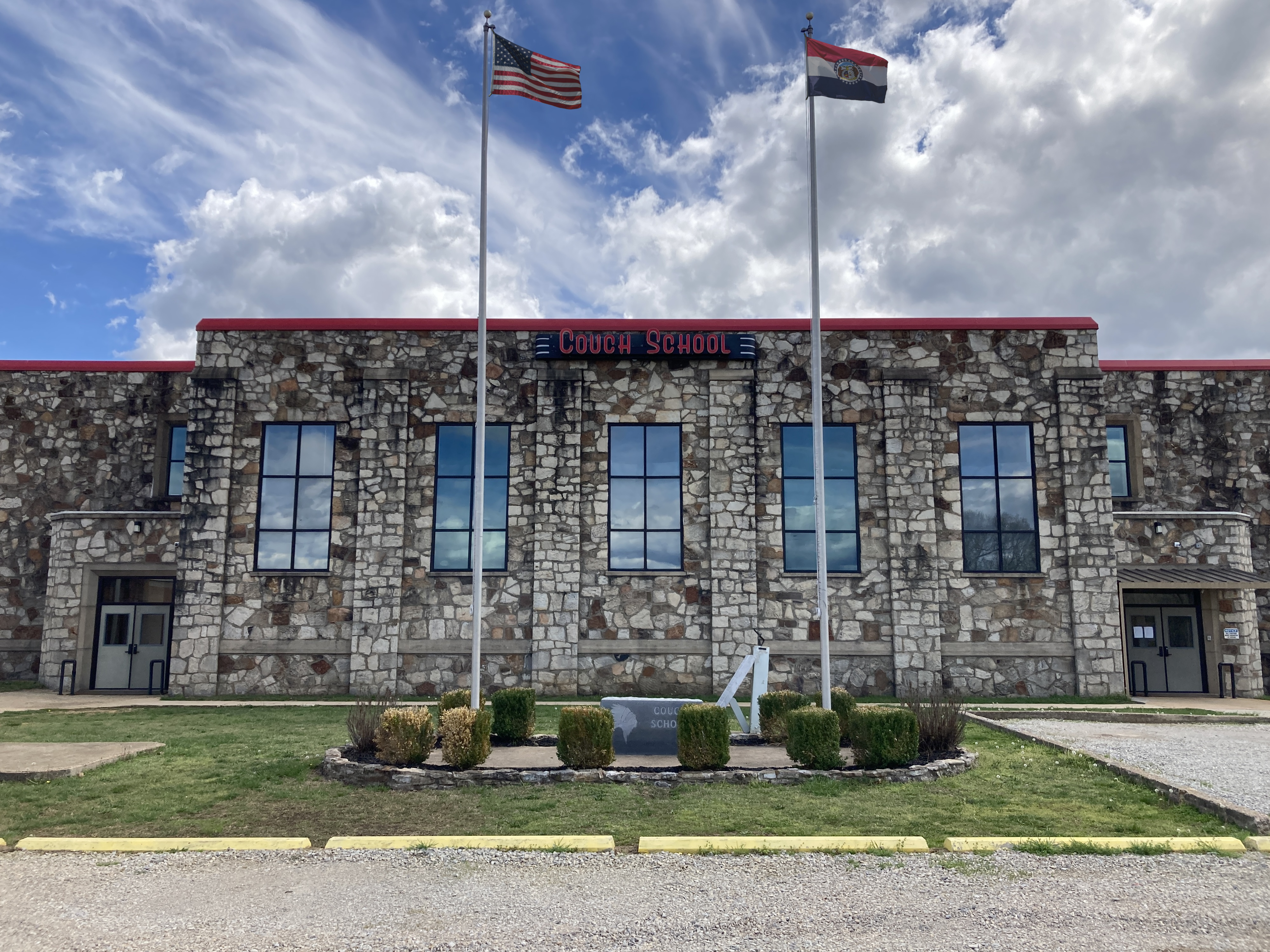

Location
- 22206 MO-142; Myrtle, MO 65778 United States

District information
- Type: Public (government funded)
- Established: 1923
- Superintendent: Ms Katie Janes
- Deputy superintendent(s): N/A
- Accreditations: Missouri Department of Elementary and Secondary Education (DESE)
- Schools: 2

Students and staff
- Students: 184
- Teachers: 22 (on FTE basis)
- Student–teacher ratio: 8.36

Other information
- Website: www.couch.k12.mo.us

The Couch R-I School District is a school district in Myrtle, Missouri, United States. It is one of four public school districts in Oregon County.

== Superintendents ==
- Jean Meyer (July 2019 – 2023)
- Katie Janes (July 2024 – present)
