= Long Hollow Creek =

Stream in the American state of Missouri

Long Hollow Creek is a stream in Oregon County the Ozarks of southern Missouri. It is a tributary to the Eleven Point River.

The stream headwaters are located at 36°47′25″N 91°22′05″W and the confluence with the Eleven Point is at 36°49′01″N 91°21′46″W.

Long Hollow Creek was so named on account of the relatively long valley through which it runs.

== See also ==
- List of rivers of Missouri
