= Bay Creek (Eleven Point River tributary) =

Stream in Missouri, U.S.

Bay Creek is a stream in southwest Ripley and southeast Oregon counties in southern Missouri and northern Randolf County in northern Arkansas. It is a tributary of the Eleven Point River.

The headwaters are in Ripley County at 36°30′51″N 91°06′10″W and the confluence with the Eleven Point is in northern Randolph County at36°29′05″N 91°09′51″W.

Bay Creek has the name of the local Bay family.

== See also ==
- List of rivers of Arkansas
- List of rivers of Missouri
