= Huddleston, Missouri =

Unincorporated community in Missouri, U.S.

Coordinates: 36°43′39″N 91°25′29″W

Huddleston is an unincorporated community in Oregon County, in the U.S. state of Missouri.

== History ==
A post office called Huddleston was established in 1855, and remained in operation until 1860. The community has the name of Benjamin Huddleston, an early citizen.
