= Warm Fork Spring River =

Stream in Fulton County, Arkansas and Oregon County, Missouri in the United States

Warm Fork Spring River Tributary to Spring River
- Location of Spring River mouth Warm Fork Spring River (the United States)

Location
- Country: United States
- State: Missouri; Arkansas
- County: Fulton (AR); Oregon (MO)
- City: Thayer, MO

Physical characteristics
- Source: confluence of Howell Creek and Elk Creek
  - location: about 3 miles northeast of Brandsville, Missouri
  - coordinates: 36°40′35.87″N 091°38′59.64″W
  - elevation: 750 ft (230 m)
- Mouth: Spring River
  - location: Mammoth Spring, Arkansas
  - coordinates: 36°29′40.23″N 091°23′9.51″W
  - elevation: 492 ft (150 m)
- Length: 19.21 mi (30.92 km)
- Basin size: 238.04 square miles (616.5 km^{2})
- Discharge
  - location: Spring River
  - average: 317.46 cu ft/s (8.989 m^{3}/s) at mouth with Spring River

Basin features
- Progression: Spring River → Black River → White River → Mississippi River → Gulf of Mexico
- River system: White River
- Tributaries
  - left: Elk Creek; Anthony Branch; Cox Creek
  - right: Howell Creek; Mill Stone Branch; Bay Creek
- Bridges: County Road M, unnamed road (x4), Oregon County 327, unnamed road, MO 19, E Adams Street, Warm Fork Road, US 63, W Walnut Street, US 63, unnamed road

The Warm Fork Spring River is a stream in Oregon County, Missouri, and northern Fulton County, Arkansas in the United States.

== Description ==
The stream begins in western Oregon County at the confluence of Howell Creek and Elk Creek and the stream becomes the Spring River at its confluence with the cold springwaters of Mammoth Spring in northern Fulton County.

The stream was named due to the temperature difference between its waters and the cold springwaters entering from Mammoth Spring. This is the only stream of this name in the United States.

== Variant names ==
According to the Geographic Names Information System, it has also been known historically as:

- Spring River

== Tributaries ==
- Orchard Creek

== See also ==
- List of rivers of Missouri
- List of rivers of Arkansas
