= Watson Spring (Oregon County, Missouri) =

River in Missouri, United States

Coordinates: 36°42′13″N 91°34′03″W

Watson Spring is a spring in Oregon County in the Ozarks of southern Missouri.

Watson Spring has the name of Samuel Watson, a pioneer citizen.
