= Royal Oak, Missouri =

Unincorporated community in Missouri, U.S.

Coordinates: 36°44′02″N 91°28′21″W

Royal Oak is an unincorporated community in Oregon County, in the U.S. state of Missouri. The community is located on U.S. Route 160, approximately five miles northwest of Alton. Dry Creek flows past approximately one half mile east of the location.

== History ==
A post office called Royaloak was established in 1894, and remained in operation until 1895. Besides the post office, Royal Oak had a church, and a school. The site was so named on account of a nearby tract of oak trees.
