= Deckard-Y, Missouri =

Unincorporated community in Missouri, U.S.

Coordinates: 36°32′46″N 91°15′14″W

Deckard-Y is an unincorporated community in Oregon County, in the U.S. state of Missouri.

A community called "Deckard" was named after Kellis Deckard, a local tradesman.
