= Hollis, Missouri =

Unincorporated community in Missouri, U.S.

Coordinates: 36°42′16″N 91°18′18″W

Hollis is an unincorporated community in Oregon County, in the U.S. state of Missouri.

The community is named for the local Hollis family.
