= Mill Creek (Eleven Point River tributary) =

Stream in the American state of Missouri

Mill Creek is a stream in Oregon County, Missouri and Randolph County, Arkansas. It is a tributary of the Eleven Point River.

The stream headwaters in Missouri are at 36°32′04″N 91°19′52″W at an elevation of 920 feet and the confluence with the Eleven Point River in Arkansas is at 36°29′39″N 91°10′25″W at an elevation of 354 feet.

Mill Creek was so named due to the presence of several gristmills along its course.

== See also ==
- List of rivers of Arkansas
- List of rivers of Missouri
