= Clifton, Oregon County, Missouri =

Unincorporated community in Missouri, U.S.

Coordinates: 36°33′24″N 91°31′49″W

Clifton is an unincorporated community in Oregon County, in the U.S. state of Missouri.

The community derives its name from George and William J. Cliff, early settlers.
