= Griswold, Missouri =

Unincorporated community in Missouri, U.S.

Coordinates: 36°30′41″N 91°08′41″W

Griswold is an unincorporated community in the southeast corner of Oregon County, in the Ozarks of southern Missouri.

== History ==
A post office called Griswold was established in 1887, and remained in operation until 1907. The community has the name of James Griswold, a local merchant.
