= Chapin, Missouri =

Unincorporated community in Missouri, U.S.

Coordinates: 36°41′26″N 91°46′18″W

Chapin is an unincorporated community in Howell County, in the U.S. state of Missouri. The community was located along the St. Louis–San Francisco Railway on the north bank of Howell Creek, approximately four miles southeast of West Plains.

== History ==
A post office called Chapin was established in 1888, and remained in operation until 1920. The community has the name of Hugh Chapin, a local judge.
