= Riverton, Missouri =

Extinct hamlet in Missouri, U.S.

Coordinates: 36°38′54″N 91°12′05″W

Riverton is an extinct town in Oregon County, in the U.S. state of Missouri. The GNIS classifies it as a populated place. The site is located on U.S. Route 160 on the west side of the crossing over the Eleven Point River.

Riverton was founded in the 1920s, taking its name from Riverton, Wyoming.
