= Cow Hollow (Missouri) =

Valley in Missouri, United States

Coordinates: 36.6550595°N 91.4609722°W

Cow Hollow is a valley in Oregon County in the U.S. state of Missouri.

Cow Hollow was so named on account of cows which occupied its pastures.
