= Garfield, Missouri =

Unincorporated community in Missouri, U.S.

Coordinates: 36°35′07″N 91°19′33″W

Garfield is an unincorporated community in southeast Oregon County, in the Ozarks of southern Missouri. The community is located adjacent to Missouri Route E, approximately three miles southeast of Couch.

== History ==
A variant name was "Sittonville". A post office called Garfield was established in 1882, and remained in operation until 1906. The community has the name of James A. Garfield, 20th President of the United States.
