= Corona, Missouri =

Unincorporated community in Missouri, U.S.

Coordinates: 36°33′04″N 91°24′42″W

Corona is an unincorporated community in Oregon County, in the U.S. state of Missouri.

== History ==
A post office called Corona was established in 1900, and remained in operation until 1906. The name most likely alludes to the color of a nearby spring.
