= Many Springs, Missouri =

Unincorporated community in Missouri, U.S.

Many Springs
- Unincorporated community
- Interactive map of Many Springs
- Coordinates: 36.6533921°N 91.2665225°W
- Country: United States
- State: Missouri
- County: Oregon
- Post office established: 1875
- Post office closed: 1907
- Named for: The many springs near the original town site

Many Springs is an unincorporated community in Oregon County, in the U.S. state of Missouri.

== History ==
A post office called Many Springs was established in 1875, and remained in operation until 1907. The community was so named on account of the many springs near the original town site.
