= Brawley, Missouri =

Unincorporated community in Missouri, U.S.

Coordinates: 36°52′26″N 91°17′02″W

Brawley is an unincorporated community in Oregon County, in the U.S. state of Missouri.

== History ==
A post office called Brawley was established in 1890, and remained in operation until 1914. The community has the name of James Brawley, an early settler. An early variant name was "Butts".
