= Tucker Creek (Oregon County, Missouri) =

Stream in the U.S. state of Missouri

Tucker Creek is a stream in Oregon County in the Ozarks of southern Missouri.

The stream headwaters are at 36°41′24″N 91°26′46″W and the confluence with Piney Creek is at 36°41′10″N 91°22′54″W. The stream source area lies about 2.5 miles west of Alton and the stream flows almost due east past Alton on the south and joins Piney Creek about one half mile east of the town after passing under Missouri Route 19.

Tucker Creek, historically called "Tucker Branch", has the name of John Tucker, a pioneer citizen.

== See also ==
- List of rivers of Missouri
