= Brandsville, Missouri =

- City
- Location of Brandsville, Missouri
- Coordinates: 36°39′03″N 91°41′47″W
- Country: United States
- State: Missouri
- County: Howell

Area
  - Total: 0.52 sq mi (1.35 km^{2})
  - Land: 0.52 sq mi (1.35 km^{2})
  - Water: 0 sq mi (0.00 km^{2})
- Elevation: 945 ft (288 m)

Population (2020)
  - Total: 127
  - Density: 243.1/sq mi (93.86/km^{2})
- Time zone: UTC-6 (Central (CST))
  - Summer (DST): UTC-5 (CDT)
- ZIP code: 65688
- Area code: 417
- FIPS code: 29-07948
- GNIS feature ID =: 2394241

Brandsville is a city in southeastern Howell County, Missouri, United States. The population was 124 at the 2020 census.

== History ==
Brandsville was platted in 1883, and named after Michael Brand, the original owner of the city site. A post office called Brandsville has been in operation since 1883.

== Geography ==
Brandsville is located on U.S. Route 63, southeast of West Plains and just west of the Howell County - Oregon County line. Koshkonong lies along Route 63 to the southeast.

According to the United States Census Bureau, the city has a total area of 0.52 square miles (1.35 km^{2}), all land.

== Demographics ==
Historical population
Census	Pop.	Note	%±
1920	352		—
1930	254		−27.8%
1940	224		−11.8%
1950	204		−8.9%
1960	128		−37.3%
1970	145		13.3%
1980	133		−8.3%
1990	167		25.6%
2000	174		4.2%
2010	161		−7.5%
2020	127		−21.1%
U.S. Decennial Census

=== 2010 census ===
As of the census of 2010, there were 161 people, 61 households, and 39 families living in the city. The population density was 309.6 inhabitants per square mile (119.5/km^{2}). There were 79 housing units at an average density of 151.9 per square mile (58.6/km^{2}). The racial makeup of the city was 89.44% White, 0.62% Native American, 8.70% from other races, and 1.24% from two or more races. Hispanic or Latino of any race were 12.42% of the population.

There were 61 households, of which 39.3% had children under the age of 18 living with them, 41.0% were married couples living together, 9.8% had a female householder with no husband present, 13.1% had a male householder with no wife present, and 36.1% were non-families. 27.9% of all households were made up of individuals, and 13.2% had someone living alone who was 65 years of age or older. The average household size was 2.64 and the average family size was 3.15.

The median age in the city was 30.9 years. 27.3% of residents were under the age of 18; 12.4% were between the ages of 18 and 24; 24.9% were from 25 to 44; 25.6% were from 45 to 64; and 9.9% were 65 years of age or older. The gender makeup of the city was 54.7% male and 45.3% female.

=== 2000 census ===
As of the census of 2000, there were 174 people, 65 households, and 44 families living in the city. The population density was 367.7 inhabitants per square mile (142.0/km^{2}). There were 70 housing units at an average density of 147.9 per square mile (57.1/km^{2}). The racial makeup of the city was 97.70% White, 1.15% Native American, and 1.15% from two or more races.

There were 65 households, out of which 40.0% had children under the age of 18 living with them, 49.2% were married couples living together, 9.2% had a female householder with no husband present, and 32.3% were non-families. 27.7% of all households were made up of individuals, and 12.3% had someone living alone who was 65 years of age or older. The average household size was 2.68 and the average family size was 3.16.

In the city, the population was spread out, with 33.3% under the age of 18, 7.5% from 18 to 24, 30.5% from 25 to 44, 20.7% from 45 to 64, and 8.0% who were 65 years of age or older. The median age was 31 years. For every 100 females, there were 117.5 males. For every 100 females age 18 and over, there were 107.1 males.

The median income for a household in the city was $27,188, and the median income for a family was $30,000. Males had a median income of $23,214 versus $16,875 for females. The per capita income for the city was $12,024. About 20.5% of families and 21.4% of the population were below the poverty line, including 21.4% of those under the age of eighteen and 14.3% of those 65 or over.
