= Braswell, Missouri =

Unincorporated community in Missouri, U.S.

Coordinates: 36°42′50″N 91°18′39″W

Braswell is an unincorporated community in Oregon County, in the U.S. state of Missouri.

== History ==
A post office called Braswell was established in 1894, and remained in operation until 1915. The community has the name of Thomas Braswell, a first settler.
