= Watson Spring (Georgia) =

Coordinates: 33°42′4.44″N 83°17′28.57″W

Watson Spring is a spring in the U.S. state of Georgia.

Watson Spring was named after Douglas Watson, an original owner of the site.
