= Frederick Creek (Missouri) =

Stream in the American state of Missouri

Frederick Creek is a stream in Oregon County of the Ozarks of southern Missouri. It is a tributary of Eleven Point River.

The stream headwaters are at 36°42′39″N 91°29′05″W and the confluence with the Eleven Point is at 36°33′49″N 91°10′40″W.

Frederick Creek, also historically called "Frederick's Fork", has the name of an early settler.

== See also ==
- List of rivers of Missouri
