= Tucker Creek (Castor River tributary) =

Stream in the American state of Missouri

Coordinates: 37.540610°N 90.168448°W

Tucker Creek is a stream in Madison County in the U.S. state of Missouri. It is a tributary of Castor River.

Tucker Creek has the name of Francis Marion Tucker, a pioneer settler.

== See also ==
- List of rivers of Missouri
