= Bay Creek (South Fork Spring River tributary) =

Stream in Missouri, U.S.

Bay Creek is a stream in the U.S. states of Arkansas and Missouri. It is a tributary of the South Fork Spring River.

The stream headwaters are in Howell County at 36°32′36″N 91°57′12″W and the confluence with the South Fork Spring River in Fulton County is at 36°27′27″N 91°51′50″W.

Bay Creek has the name of the local Bay family.

== See also ==
- List of rivers of Arkansas
- List of rivers of Missouri
