= Thomasville, Missouri =

Census-designated place in Oregon County, Missouri

Thomasville
- Census-designated place
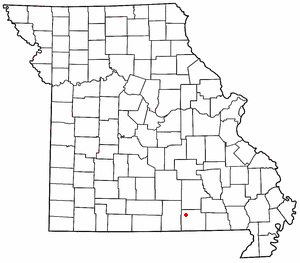
- Interactive map of Thomasville
- Coordinates: 36°47′21″N 91°31′56″W
- County: Oregon
- State: Missouri

Area
  - Total: 0.38 sq mi (0.98 km^{2})
  - Land: 0.37 sq mi (0.97 km^{2})
  - Water: 0.0077 sq mi (0.02 km^{2})
- Elevation: 640 ft (200 m)

Population (2020)
  - Total: 23
  - Density: 61.6/sq mi (23.78/km^{2})
- Area code: 573
- FIPS code: 29-73006
- GNIS feature ID: 2587117

Thomasville is a census-designated place in northern Oregon County, Missouri, United States. The population was 23 at the 2020 census. It is located 9 miles (14 km) northwest of Alton on Route 99.

== Name ==
According to a 1945 thesis on southern Missouri place names, the community was named for George Thomas, a pioneer settler, in 1817. However, in 1961, the State Historical Society of Missouri placed a historical plaque that claims the town was named after land donors, John and Matilda Thomas, in 1845.

== History ==
The first settlers in the area arrived in the mid-1810s from Kentucky, settling in several log cabins along the Eleven Point River. The colony steadily grew over the next few decades. A Baptist church was established the 1830s.

When Oregon County was established in 1841, Thomasville was elected its first county seat, which at that time included parts of modern-day Howell, Shannon, and Carter Counties. The county seat moved to nearby Alton in 1859. Thomasville was platted in 1846. A post office called Thomasville was established in 1846 and remained in operation until 1979.

== Demographics ==
Historical population
Census	Pop.	Note	%±
2010	68		—
2020	23		−66.2%
U.S. Decennial Census

As of the 2020 US Census, there were 23 people and 15 households living in the census-designated place. The racial makeup of the city was 82.6% White, 4.3% Black or African American, and 13% two or more races (White and Native American).

There were 15 households, of which 13% had children under the age of 18 living with them, 80% were married couples living together, 13.3% had a female householder with no spouse or partner present, and 6.7% had a male householder with no spouse or partner present. 86.7% had someone living there who was 65 years of age or older. 80% lived in owned properties while 20% rented. The median age was 56.5 years: 45.9 for males and 65.5 for females. 17.4% of residents were under the age of 18 and 26.1% were 65 years of age or older. The gender makeup of the city was 47.1% male and 52.9% female.

== Education ==
Thomasville has a public library, the Thomasville Branch library.
