= Birch Tree Township, Shannon County, Missouri =

Inactive township in the American state of Missouri

Coordinates: 36.9806°N 91.4969°W

Birch Tree Township is an inactive township in Shannon County, in the U.S. state of Missouri.

Birch Tree Township was originally named Birch Valley Township, and under the latter name was established in 1842.
