= Couch, Missouri =

Unincorporated community in Missouri, US

- Unincorporated community
- Couch Public School

- Location within Missouri
- Coordinates: 36°36′22″N 91°22′59″W
- Country: United States
- State: Missouri
- County: Oregon
- Elevation: 679 ft (207 m)
- Postal code: 65690
- GNIS feature ID: 716377

Couch is a small, unincorporated community in Oregon County, Missouri, United States. It is located six miles south of Alton on Missouri Route A. The ZIP Code for Couch is 65690.

== History ==
A post office called Couch has been in operation since 1887. The community has the name of George W. Couch, a first settler.
