= Cow Hollow (Hickman County, Tennessee) =

Valley in Tennessee, United States of America

Coordinates: 35.783954°N 87.631413°W

Cow Hollow is a valley in Hickman County, Tennessee, in the United States.

Cow Hollow was so named on account of cattle being herded there to graze in the 1820s.

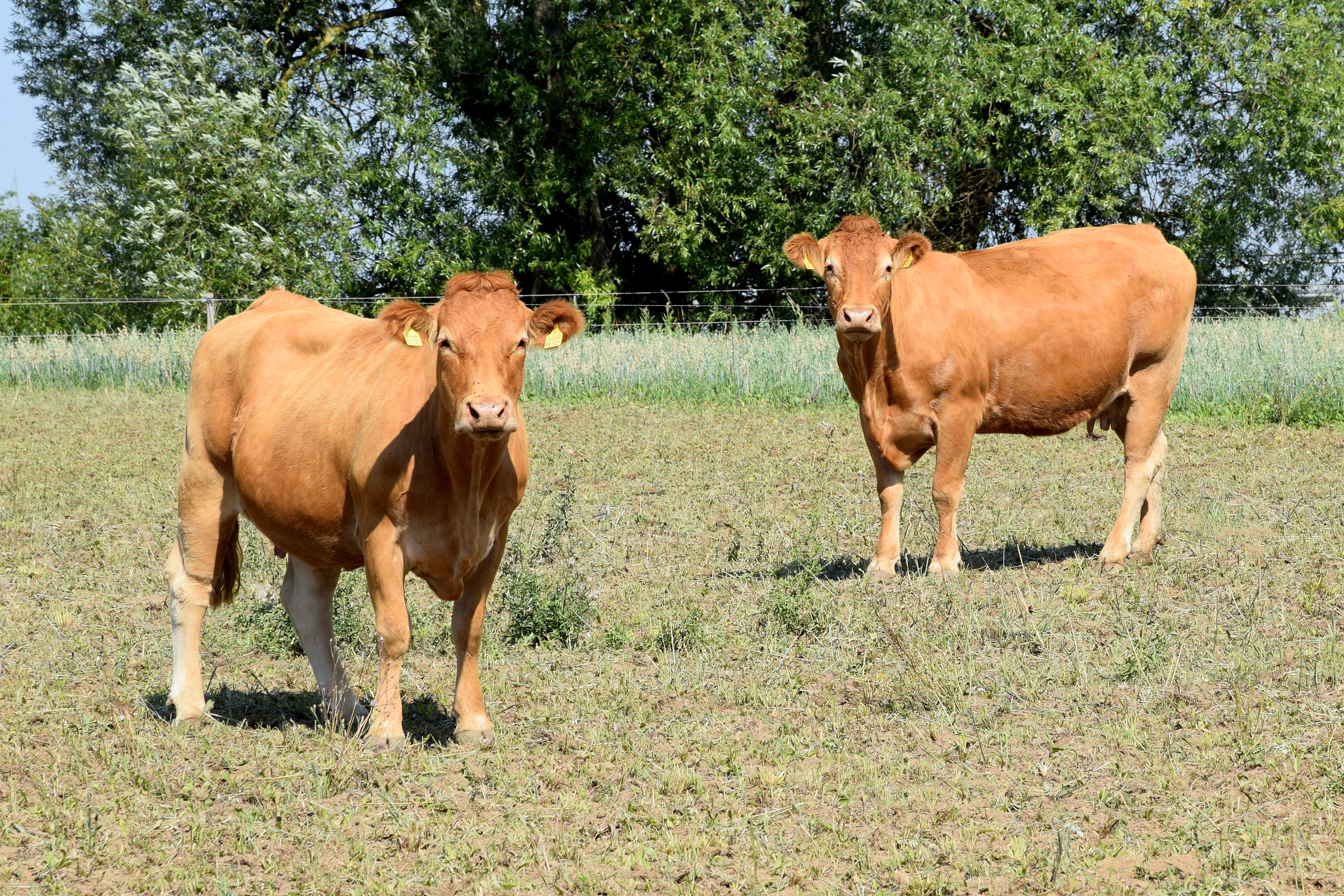
Cows grazing in the hollow
