= Rover, Missouri =

Unincorporated community in Missouri, U.S.

Coordinates: 36°43′18″N 91°37′16″W

Rover is an unincorporated community in western Oregon County, in the U.S. state of Missouri. The community lies approximately 11 miles west of Alton and is on Missouri Route M, 1.5 miles south of U.S. Route 160.

== History ==
A post office called Rover was established in 1900, and remained in operation until 1945. The community was named after Rover, the dog of an early postmaster.
