= Colvin Creek (Current River tributary) =

Stream in the American state of Missouri

Coordinates: 36.75175°N 90.92171°W

Colvin Creek is a stream in Ripley County in the U.S. state of Missouri. It is a tributary of the Current River.

Colvin Creek has the name of the local Colvin family.

== See also ==
- List of rivers of Missouri
