= Piney Creek (St. Francis River tributary) =

Stream in the U.S. state of Missouri

Piney Creek is a stream in Madison County in the U.S. state of Missouri. It is a tributary of the St. Francis River.

The stream headwaters arise on the south flank of Holladay Mountain at 37°35′09″N 90°23′32″W at an elevation of approximately 800 feet. The stream flows to the south-southwest passing under Missouri Route 72 to the west of the Oak Grove community. The stream continues to the southwest passing under Missouri Route D to its confluence with the St. Francis west of Rhodes Mountain and south of the Silver Mine Recreation Area. The confluence is at 37°32′43″N 90°25′59″W and an elevation of 568 feet.

Piney Creek was so named on account of scrub pine near its course.

== See also ==
- List of rivers of Missouri
