= Birch Tree, Missouri =

City in Shannon County, Missouri, United States

- City
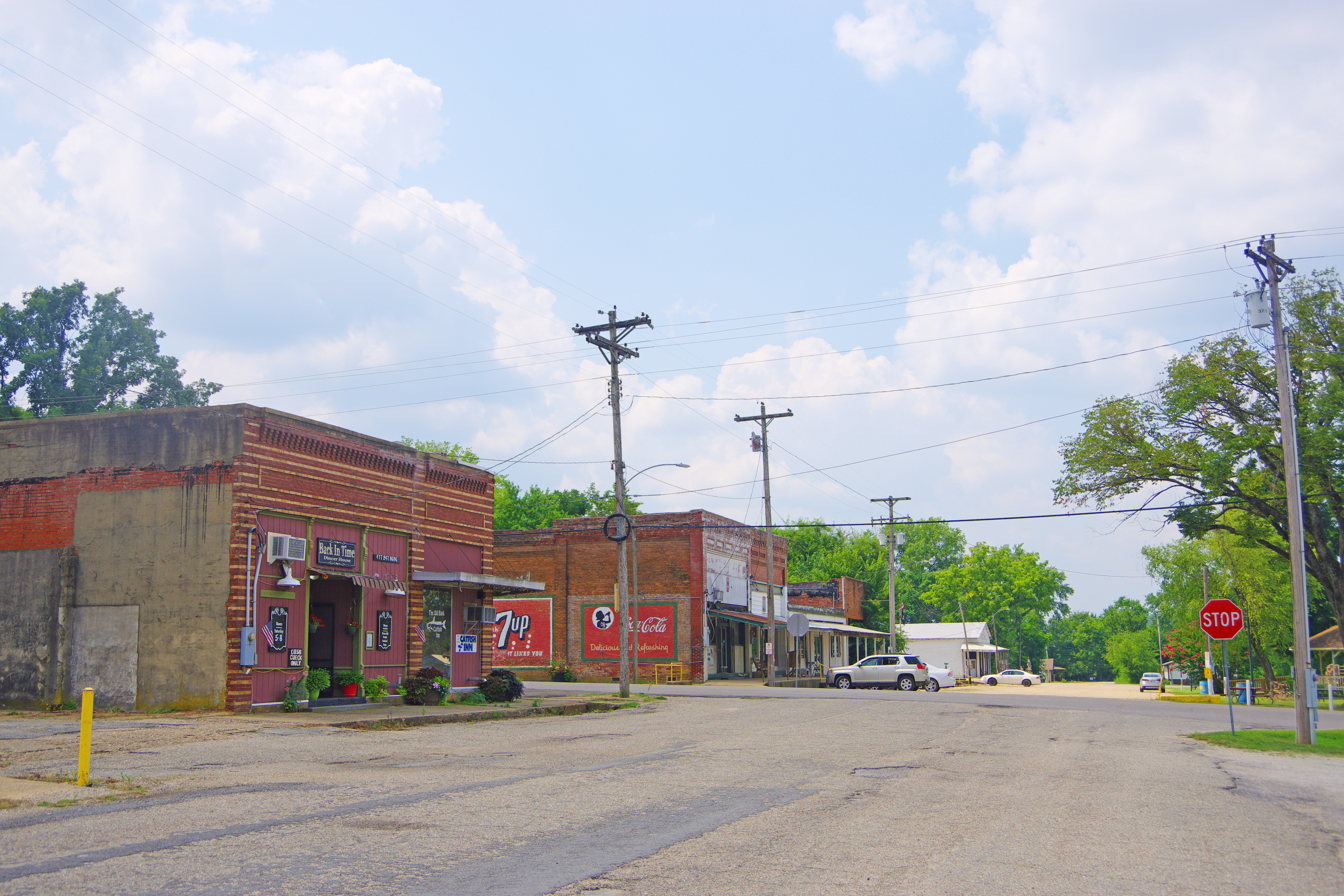
- 1st Street, August 2021

- Location of Birch Tree, Missouri
- Coordinates: 36°59′48″N 91°29′30″W
- Country: United States
- State: Missouri
- County: Shannon
- Township: Birch Tree

Government
  - Mayor: Louis Colaiannia III

Area
  - Total: 1.38 sq mi (3.58 km^{2})
  - Land: 1.38 sq mi (3.58 km^{2})
  - Water: 0 sq mi (0.00 km^{2})
- Elevation: 1,011 ft (308 m)

Population (2020)
  - Total: 541
  - Density: 391.9/sq mi (151.31/km^{2})
- Time zone: UTC-6 (Central (CST))
  - Summer (DST): UTC-5 (CDT)
- ZIP code: 65438
- Area code: 573
- FIPS code: 29-05734
- GNIS feature ID: 2394170

Birch Tree is a city in southwest Shannon County, Missouri, United States. The population was 541 at the 2020 census.

== History ==
A post office called Birch Tree has been in operation since the 1860s. The community was named for a grove of birch trees near the original town site.

== Geography ==
Birch Tree is located in the Missouri Ozarks in southwestern Shannon County. The city is on US Route 60 approximately 11 miles east of Mountain View in adjacent Howell County and 8.5 miles west of Winona.

According to the United States Census Bureau, the city has a total area of 1.38 square miles (3.57 km^{2}), all land.

== Demographics ==
Historical population
Census	Pop.	Note	%±
1890	535		—
1910	497		—
1920	452		−9.1%
1930	505		11.7%
1940	495		−2.0%
1950	409		−17.4%
1960	420		2.7%
1970	573		36.4%
1980	622		8.6%
1990	599		−3.7%
2000	634		5.8%
2010	679		7.1%
2020	541		−20.3%
U.S. Decennial Census

=== 2010 census ===
As of the census of 2010, there were 679 people, 298 households, and 167 families living in the city. The population density was 492.0 inhabitants per square mile (190.0/km^{2}). There were 347 housing units at an average density of 251.4 units per square mile (97.1 units/km^{2}). The racial makeup of the city was 92.78% White, 0.29% Black or African American, 0.88% Native American, 0.74% Asian, 3.09% from other races, and 2.21% from two or more races. Hispanic or Latino of any race were 6.92% of the population.

There were 298 households, of which 29.5% had children under the age of 18 living with them, 39.6% were married couples living together, 12.8% had a female householder with no husband present, 3.7% had a male householder with no wife present, and 44.0% were non-families. 39.3% of all households were made up of individuals, and 17.5% had someone living alone who was 65 years of age or older. The average household size was 2.28 and the average family size was 3.04.

The median age in the city was 38.9 years. 24.9% of residents were under the age of 18; 9.1% were between the ages of 18 and 24; 23.6% were from 25 to 44; 25.1% were from 45 to 64; and 17.4% were 65 years of age or older. The gender makeup of the city was 48.3% male and 51.7% female.

=== 2000 census ===
As of the census of 2000, there were 634 people, 276 households, and 170 families living in the city. The population density was 478.0 inhabitants per square mile (184.6/km^{2}). There were 323 housing units at an average density of 243.5 units per square mile (94.0 units/km^{2}). The racial makeup of the city was 95.11% White, 0.32% African American, 2.05% Native American, 0.79% from other races, and 1.74% from two or more races. Hispanic or Latino of any race were 1.58% of the population.

There were 276 households, out of which 30.1% had children under the age of 18 living with them, 42.4% were married couples living together, 14.5% had a female householder with no husband present, and 38.4% were non-families. 35.9% of all households were made up of individuals, and 18.8% had someone living alone who was 65 years of age or older. The average household size was 2.30 and the average family size was 2.95.

In the city the population was spread out, with 27.1% under the age of 18, 7.7% from 18 to 24, 26.8% from 25 to 44, 22.2% from 45 to 64, and 16.1% who were 65 years of age or older. The median age was 36 years. For every 100 females there were 84.3 males. For every 100 females age 18 and over, there were 77.7 males.

The median income for a household in the city was $14,236, and the median income for a family was $18,182. Males had a median income of $16,932 versus $14,531 for females. The per capita income for the city was $7,695. About 38.3% of families and 46.0% of the population were below the poverty line, including 59.2% of those under age 18 and 41.7% of those age 65 or over.

== Education ==
Mountain View-Birch Tree R-III School District operates Birch Tree Elementary School in the community.

The town has a lending library, the Birch Tree City Library.

== Notable people ==
- Mel Carnahan, Governor of Missouri (1993–2000), the only person to be posthumously elected to the U.S. Senate; born in Birch Tree.
- Bob Holden, Governor of Missouri (2001–2005); raised in Birch Tree.

== See also ==
- List of cities in Missouri
