= Koshkonong, Missouri =

City in Oregon County, Missouri, United States

- City
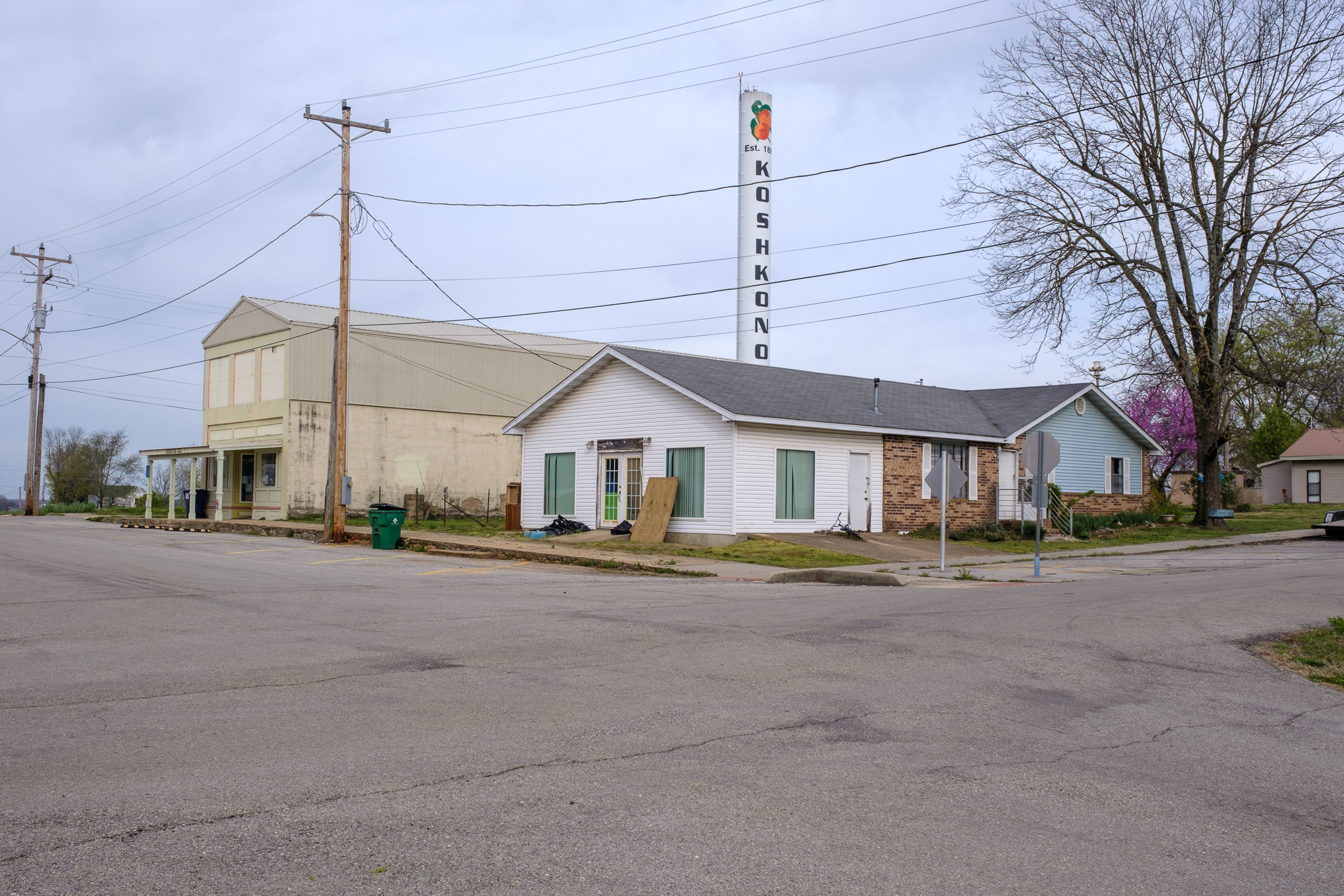

- Location of Koshkonong, Missouri
- Coordinates: 36°35′51″N 91°38′45″W
- Country: United States
- State: Missouri
- County: Oregon

Area
  - Total: 0.18 sq mi (0.46 km^{2})
  - Land: 0.18 sq mi (0.46 km^{2})
  - Water: 0 sq mi (0.00 km^{2})
- Elevation: 961 ft (293 m)

Population (2020)
  - Total: 196
  - Density: 1,093.4/sq mi (422.15/km^{2})
- Time zone: UTC-6 (Central (CST))
  - Summer (DST): UTC-5 (CDT)
- ZIP code: 65692
- Area code: 417
- FIPS code: 29-39440
- GNIS feature ID: 2396696

Koshkonong is a city in Oregon County, Missouri, United States. The population was 196 at the 2020 census.

== History ==
Koshkonong was laid out 1882, taking its name from Lake Koshkonong, in Wisconsin. A post office called Koshkonong has been in operation since 1893.

== Geography ==
According to the United States Census Bureau, the city has a total area of 0.18 square miles (0.47 km^{2}), all land.

== Demographics ==
Historical population
Census	Pop.	Note	%±
1900	213		—
1910	452		112.2%
1920	414		−8.4%
1930	358		−13.5%
1940	282		−21.2%
1950	333		18.1%
1960	478		43.5%
1970	216		−54.8%
1980	245		13.4%
1990	198		−19.2%
2000	205		3.5%
2010	212		3.4%
2020	196		−7.5%
U.S. Decennial Census

=== 2010 census ===
As of the census of 2010, there were 212 people, 85 households, and 54 families living in the city. The population density was 1,177.8 inhabitants per square mile (454.8/km^{2}). There were 102 housing units at an average density of 566.7 per square mile (218.8/km^{2}). The racial makeup of the city was 91.51% White, 0.47% Black or African American, 1.42% Native American, 0.47% from other races, and 6.13% from two or more races. Hispanic or Latino of any race were 1.42% of the population.

There were 85 households, of which 32.9% had children under the age of 18 living with them, 42.4% were married couples living together, 10.6% had a female householder with no husband present, 10.6% had a male householder with no wife present, and 36.5% were non-families. 28.2% of all households were made up of individuals, and 12.9% had someone living alone who was 65 years of age or older. The average household size was 2.49 and the average family size was 2.98.

The median age in the city was 39 years. 23.1% of residents were under the age of 18; 13.2% were between the ages of 18 and 24; 22.2% were from 25 to 44; 29.2% were from 45 to 64; and 12.3% were 65 years of age or older. The gender makeup of the city was 46.7% male and 53.3% female.

=== 2000 census ===
As of the census of 2000, there were 205 people, 91 households, and 53 families living in the town. The population density was 1,087.6 inhabitants per square mile (419.9/km^{2}). There were 108 housing units at an average density of 573.0 per square mile (221.2/km^{2}). The racial makeup of the town was 94.63% White, 1.95% Native American, 1.46% Asian, and 1.95% from two or more races. Hispanic or Latino of any race were 1.46% of the population.

There were 91 households, out of which 33.0% had children under the age of 18 living with them, 46.2% were married couples living together, 11.0% had a female householder with no husband present, and 40.7% were non-families. 36.3% of all households were made up of individuals, and 20.9% had someone living alone who was 65 years of age or older. The average household size was 2.25 and the average family size was 2.93.

In the town the population was spread out, with 27.8% under the age of 18, 5.9% from 18 to 24, 23.4% from 25 to 44, 25.4% from 45 to 64, and 17.6% who were 65 years of age or older. The median age was 39 years. For every 100 females there were 79.8 males. For every 100 females age 18 and over, there were 72.1 males.

The median income for a household in the town was $15,341, and the median income for a family was $16,250. Males had a median income of $21,250 versus $14,750 for females. The per capita income for the town was $7,893. About 41.8% of families and 44.6% of the population were below the poverty line, including 44.1% of those under the age of 18 and 45.2% of those 65 or over.

== Education ==
Public education in Koshkonong is administered by Oregon-Howell R-III School District, which operates one elementary school and Koshkonong High School.

Koshkonong has a public library, the Koshkonong Branch Library.

== See also ==
- List of cities in Missouri
