= Thayer, Missouri =

City in Oregon County, Missouri, United States

- City
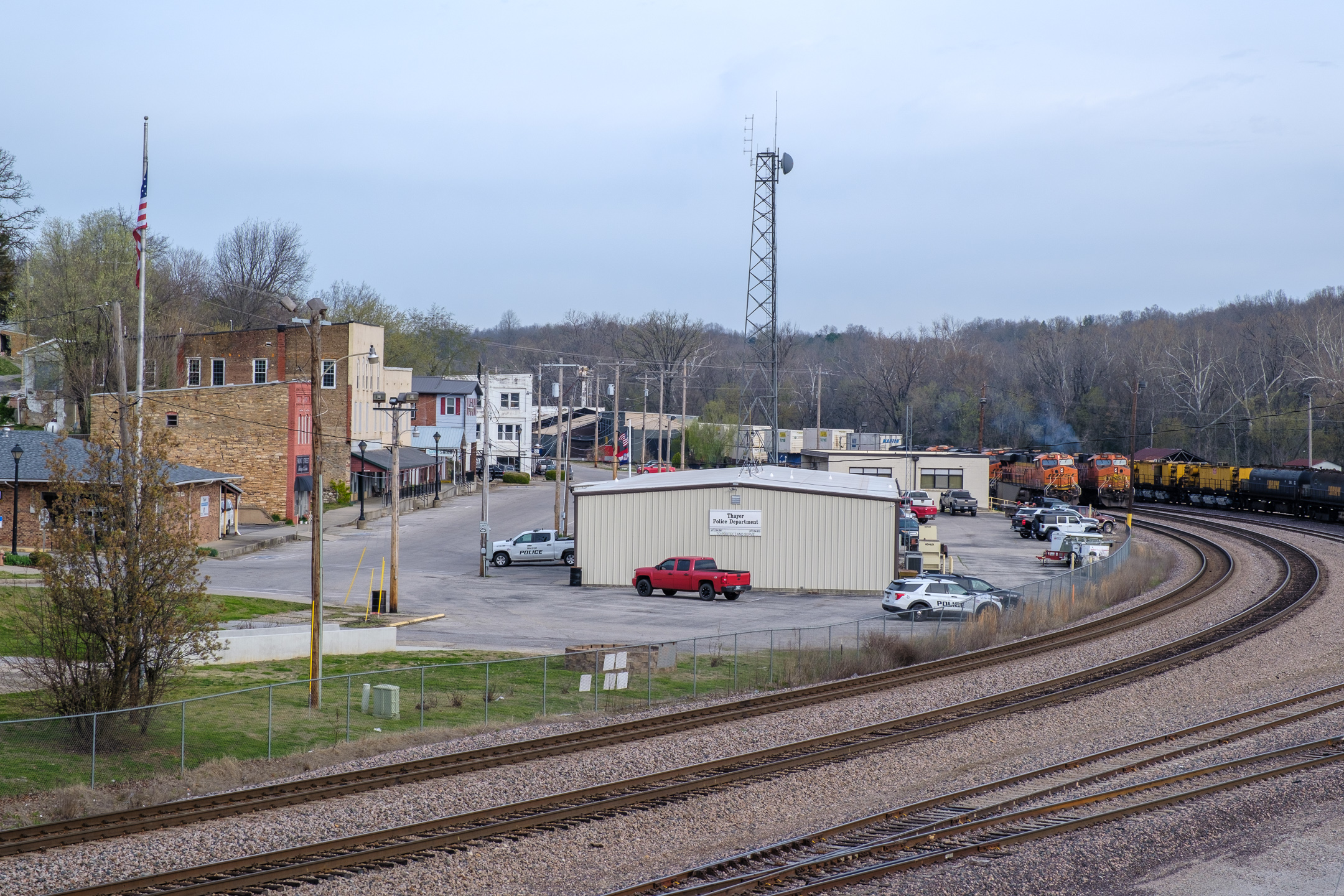

- Location of Thayer, Missouri
- Coordinates: 36°31′21″N 91°32′27″W
- Country: United States
- State: Missouri
- County: Oregon

Area
  - Total: 2.44 sq mi (6.33 km^{2})
  - Land: 2.44 sq mi (6.33 km^{2})
  - Water: 0 sq mi (0.00 km^{2})
- Elevation: 610 ft (190 m)

Population (2020)
  - Total: 1,883
  - Density: 770.9/sq mi (297.63/km^{2})
- Time zone: UTC-6 (Central (CST))
  - Summer (DST): UTC-5 (CDT)
- ZIP code: 65791
- Area code: 417
- FIPS code: 29-72826
- GNIS feature ID: 2396046
- Website: www.cityofthayermo.com

Thayer is a city on the Warm Fork Spring River in Oregon County, Missouri, United States. The population was 1,883 at the 2020 census. Its original name was Augusta.

== History ==
A post office called Thayer has been in operation since 1884. The community has the name of Nathaniel Thayer, a railroad promoter.

Thayer is considered a railroad town, as it was laid out in 1882 to be a division point. At the turn of the 20th century, 400 railroad men lived in Thayer. Currently, the Burlington Northern Santa Fe railroad travels through town.

== Geography ==
According to the United States Census Bureau, the city has a total area of 2.44 square miles (6.32 km^{2}), all land.

Thayer is located next to Mammoth Spring, Arkansas.

== Demographics ==
Historical population
Census	Pop.	Note	%±
1890	1,143		—
1900	1,276		11.6%
1910	1,613		26.4%
1920	1,738		7.7%
1930	1,632		−6.1%
1940	1,692		3.7%
1950	1,639		−3.1%
1960	1,713		4.5%
1970	1,609		−6.1%
1980	2,211		37.4%
1990	1,996		−9.7%
2000	2,201		10.3%
2010	2,243		1.9%
2020	1,883		−16.0%
U.S. Decennial Census

=== 2020 census ===
As of the 2020 census, Thayer had a population of 1,883. The median age was 42.0 years. 22.9% of residents were under the age of 18 and 24.2% of residents were 65 years of age or older. For every 100 females there were 83.9 males, and for every 100 females age 18 and over there were 79.8 males age 18 and over.

0.0% of residents lived in urban areas, while 100.0% lived in rural areas.

There were 832 households in Thayer, of which 25.4% had children under the age of 18 living in them. Of all households, 32.6% were married-couple households, 20.7% were households with a male householder and no spouse or partner present, and 40.1% were households with a female householder and no spouse or partner present. About 41.2% of all households were made up of individuals and 22.0% had someone living alone who was 65 years of age or older.

There were 1,040 housing units, of which 20.0% were vacant. The homeowner vacancy rate was 5.7% and the rental vacancy rate was 18.2%.

Racial composition as of the 2020 census
Race	Number	Percent
White	1,754	93.1%
Black or African American	9	0.5%
American Indian and Alaska Native	9	0.5%
Asian	2	0.1%
Native Hawaiian and Other Pacific Islander	0	0.0%
Some other race	5	0.3%
Two or more races	104	5.5%
Hispanic or Latino (of any race)	26	1.4%

=== 2010 census ===
As of the census of 2010, there were 2,243 people, 955 households, and 565 families living in the city. The population density was 919.3 inhabitants per square mile (354.9/km^{2}). There were 1,140 housing units at an average density of 467.2 per square mile (180.4/km^{2}). The racial makeup of the city was 96.39% White, 0.09% Black or African American, 0.94% Native American, 0.36% Asian, 0.04% Native Hawaiian or Pacific Islander, 0.18% from other races, and 2.01% from two or more races. Hispanic or Latino of any race were 1.65% of the population.

There were 955 households, of which 28.1% had children under the age of 18 living with them, 42.4% were married couples living together, 11.6% had a female householder with no husband present, 5.1% had a male householder with no wife present, and 40.8% were non-families. 36.1% of all households were made up of individuals, and 16.6% had someone living alone who was 65 years of age or older. The average household size was 2.27 and the average family size was 2.93.

The median age in the city was 42.7 years. 23.5% of residents were under the age of 18; 8.8% were between the ages of 18 and 24; 20.3% were from 25 to 44; 26.5% were from 45 to 64; and 21% were 65 years of age or older. The gender makeup of the city was 46.9% male and 53.1% female.

=== 2000 census ===
As of the census of 2000, there were 2,201 people, 931 households, and 571 families living in the city. The population density was 1,013.2 inhabitants per square mile (391.2/km^{2}). There were 1,102 housing units at an average density of 507.3 per square mile (195.9/km^{2}). The racial makeup of the city was 96.50% White, 0.09% African American, 1.50% Native American, 0.09% Asian, 0.05% Pacific Islander, 0.14% from other races, and 1.64% from two or more races. Hispanic or Latino of any race were 1.68% of the population.

There were 931 households, out of which 28.2% had children under the age of 18 living with them, 47.2% were married couples living together, 11.0% had a female householder with no husband present, and 38.6% were non-families. 36.1% of all households were made up of individuals, and 19.5% had someone living alone who was 65 years of age or older. The average household size was 2.26 and the average family size was 2.91.

In the city the population was spread out, with 25.0% under the age of 18, 8.5% from 18 to 24, 23.1% from 25 to 44, 21.0% from 45 to 64, and 22.4% who were 65 years of age or older. The median age was 40 years. For every 100 females, there were 81.8 males. For every 100 females age 18 and over, there were 77.0 males.

The median income for a household in the city was $18,648, and the median income for a family was $24,464. Males had a median income of $22,273 versus $16,364 for females. The per capita income for the city was $12,278. About 23.0% of families and 27.2% of the population were below the poverty line, including 37.4% of those under age 18 and 25.8% of those age 65 or over.

== Education ==
Public education in Thayer is administered by Thayer R-II School District.

Thayer has a public library, the Thayer Branch Library.

== See also ==
- Cities in Missouri
