= Alton, Missouri =

City in Missouri, U.S.

- City
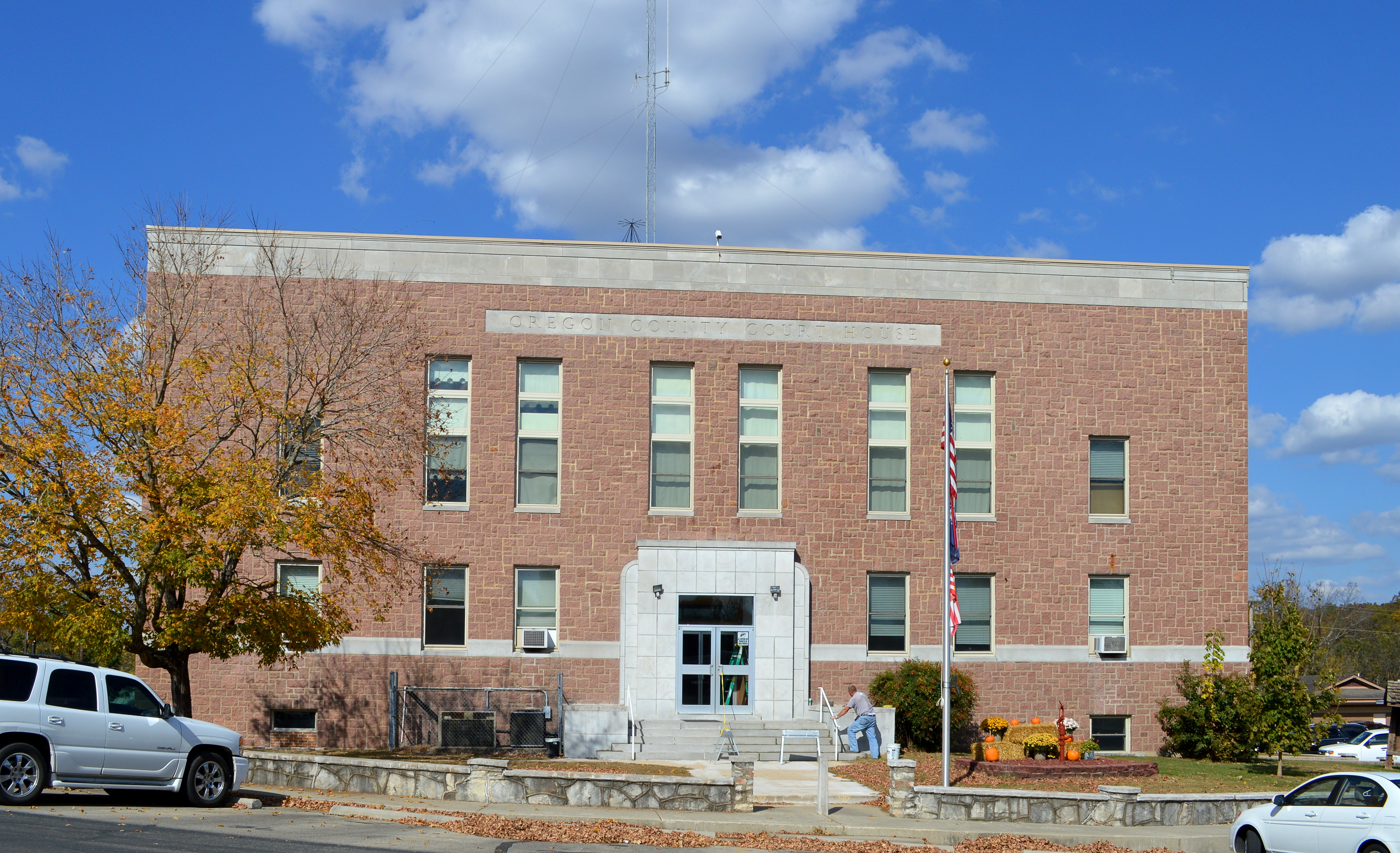
- Oregon County Courthouse

- Location of Alton, Missouri
- Coordinates: 36°41′24″N 91°23′41″W
- Country: United States
- State: Missouri
- County: Oregon
- Incorporated: 1929

Area
  - Total: 1.58 sq mi (4.10 km^{2})
  - Land: 1.57 sq mi (4.06 km^{2})
  - Water: 0.015 sq mi (0.04 km^{2})
- Elevation: 748 ft (228 m)

Population (2020)
  - Total: 707
  - Density: 450.7/sq mi (174.01/km^{2})
- Time zone: UTC-6 (Central (CST))
  - Summer (DST): UTC-5 (CDT)
- ZIP code: 65606
- Area code: 417
- FIPS code: 29-00964
- GNIS feature ID: 2393937

Alton is a city and the county seat of Oregon County, Missouri, United States. The population was 707 at the 2020 census.

== History ==
Alton was platted in 1859. The city was named after Alton, Illinois. A post office has been in operation in Alton since 1860. Alton was incorporated as a city in 1929.

Greer Mill was listed on the National Register of Historic Places in 2005.

== Demographics ==
Historical population
Census	Pop.	Note	%±
1870	76		—
1880	127		67.1%
1930	439		—
1940	576		31.2%
1950	571		−0.9%
1960	677		18.6%
1970	715		5.6%
1980	721		0.8%
1990	692		−4.0%
2000	668		−3.5%
2010	871		30.4%
2020	707		−18.8%
U.S. Decennial Census

=== 2010 census ===
As of the census of 2010, there were 871 people, 352 households, and 213 families living in the city. The population density was 554.8 inhabitants per square mile (214.2/km^{2}). There were 406 housing units at an average density of 258.6 per square mile (99.8/km^{2}). The racial makeup of the city was 95.64% White, 0.46% Black or African American, 0.69% Native American, and 3.21% from two or more races. Hispanic or Latino people of any race were 1.38% of the population.

There were 352 households, of which 32.7% had children under the age of 18 living with them, 39.8% were married couples living together, 16.2% had a female householder with no husband present, 4.5% had a male householder with no wife present, and 39.5% were non-families. 35.5% of all households were made up of individuals, and 23% had someone living alone who was 65 years of age or older. The average household size was 2.34 and the average family size was 2.99.

The median age in the city was 39.2 years. 28.7% of residents were under the age of 18; 6.3% were between the ages of 18 and 24; 22.2% were from 25 to 44; 16.9% were from 45 to 64; and 25.6% were 65 years of age or older. The gender makeup of the city was 45.7% male and 54.3% female.

=== 2000 census ===
As of the census of 2000, there were 668 people, 321 households, and 188 families living in the city. The population density was 797.2 inhabitants per square mile (307.8/km^{2}). There were 364 housing units at an average density of 434.4 per square mile (167.7/km^{2}). The racial makeup of the city was 97.01% White, 0.30% African American, 1.95% Native American, and 0.75% from two or more races. Hispanic or Latino people of any race were 0.60% of the population.

There were 321 households, out of which 24.0% had children under the age of 18 living with them, 45.2% were married couples living together, 11.2% had a female householder with no husband present, and 41.4% were non-families. 38.6% of all households were made up of individuals, and 26.8% had someone living alone who was 65 years of age or older. The average household size was 2.07 and the average family size was 2.70.

In the city, the population was spread out, with 20.1% under the age of 18, 7.3% from 18 to 24, 23.2% from 25 to 44, 22.3% from 45 to 64, and 27.1% who were 65 years of age or older. The median age was 45 years. For every 100 females there were 82.5 males. For every 100 females age 18 and over, there were 78.6 males.

The median income for a household in the city was $16,667, and the median income for a family was $21,667. Males had a median income of $21,184 versus $13,929 for females. The per capita income for the city was $10,071. About 18.0% of families and 27.4% of the population were below the poverty line, including 28.1% of those under age 18 and 33.6% of those age 65 or over.

== Geography ==
According to the United States Census Bureau, the city has a total area of 1.59 square miles (4.12 km^{2}), of which 1.57 square miles (4.07 km^{2}) is land and 0.02 square miles (0.05 km^{2}) is water.

Culp Branch, Piney Creek, Simpson Creek and Tucker Creek flow in the city.

=== Climate ===
Climate data for Alton, Missouri (1991–2020 normals, extremes 1962–2014)
Month	Jan	Feb	Mar	Apr	May	Jun	Jul	Aug	Sep	Oct	Nov	Dec	Year
Record high °F (°C)	76 (24)	82 (28)	90 (32)	92 (33)	95 (35)	101 (38)	107 (42)	109 (43)	103 (39)	96 (36)	85 (29)	76 (24)	109 (43)
Mean daily maximum °F (°C)	43.8 (6.6)	48.6 (9.2)	58.3 (14.6)	68.7 (20.4)	75.8 (24.3)	85.0 (29.4)	88.3 (31.3)	88.1 (31.2)	80.8 (27.1)	70.2 (21.2)	56.7 (13.7)	45.9 (7.7)	67.5 (19.7)
Daily mean °F (°C)	33.1 (0.6)	36.9 (2.7)	46.0 (7.8)	56.0 (13.3)	64.5 (18.1)	73.4 (23.0)	77.1 (25.1)	76.1 (24.5)	68.1 (20.1)	56.5 (13.6)	45.0 (7.2)	35.8 (2.1)	55.7 (13.2)
Mean daily minimum °F (°C)	22.4 (−5.3)	25.1 (−3.8)	33.7 (0.9)	43.2 (6.2)	53.1 (11.7)	61.7 (16.5)	65.9 (18.8)	64.2 (17.9)	55.4 (13.0)	42.8 (6.0)	33.2 (0.7)	25.7 (−3.5)	43.9 (6.6)
Record low °F (°C)	−18 (−28)	−10 (−23)	1 (−17)	15 (−9)	28 (−2)	40 (4)	46 (8)	45 (7)	31 (−1)	16 (−9)	1 (−17)	−6 (−21)	−18 (−28)
Average precipitation inches (mm)	2.96 (75)	3.39 (86)	4.45 (113)	4.66 (118)	5.57 (141)	3.31 (84)	4.01 (102)	3.92 (100)	3.46 (88)	3.77 (96)	4.44 (113)	3.29 (84)	47.23 (1,200)
Average snowfall inches (cm)	1.7 (4.3)	0.8 (2.0)	0.9 (2.3)	0.0 (0.0)	0.0 (0.0)	0.0 (0.0)	0.0 (0.0)	0.0 (0.0)	0.0 (0.0)	0.0 (0.0)	0.0 (0.0)	0.8 (2.0)	4.2 (11)
Average precipitation days (≥ 0.01 in)	6.4	6.8	9.1	7.9	9.9	6.8	7.2	7.1	5.4	6.3	7.4	6.6	86.9
Average snowy days (≥ 0.1 in)	1.1	1.0	0.3	0.0	0.0	0.0	0.0	0.0	0.0	0.0	0.0	0.4	2.8
Source: NOAA

== Education ==
Alton R-IV School District operates Alton Elementary School and Alton High School.

The town has a lending library, the Alton Branch Library.

== See also ==
- List of cities in Missouri
- Irish Wilderness
