= Eleven Point River =

River in Missouri and Arkansas, US

Coordinates: 36°9′3″N 91°4′57″W

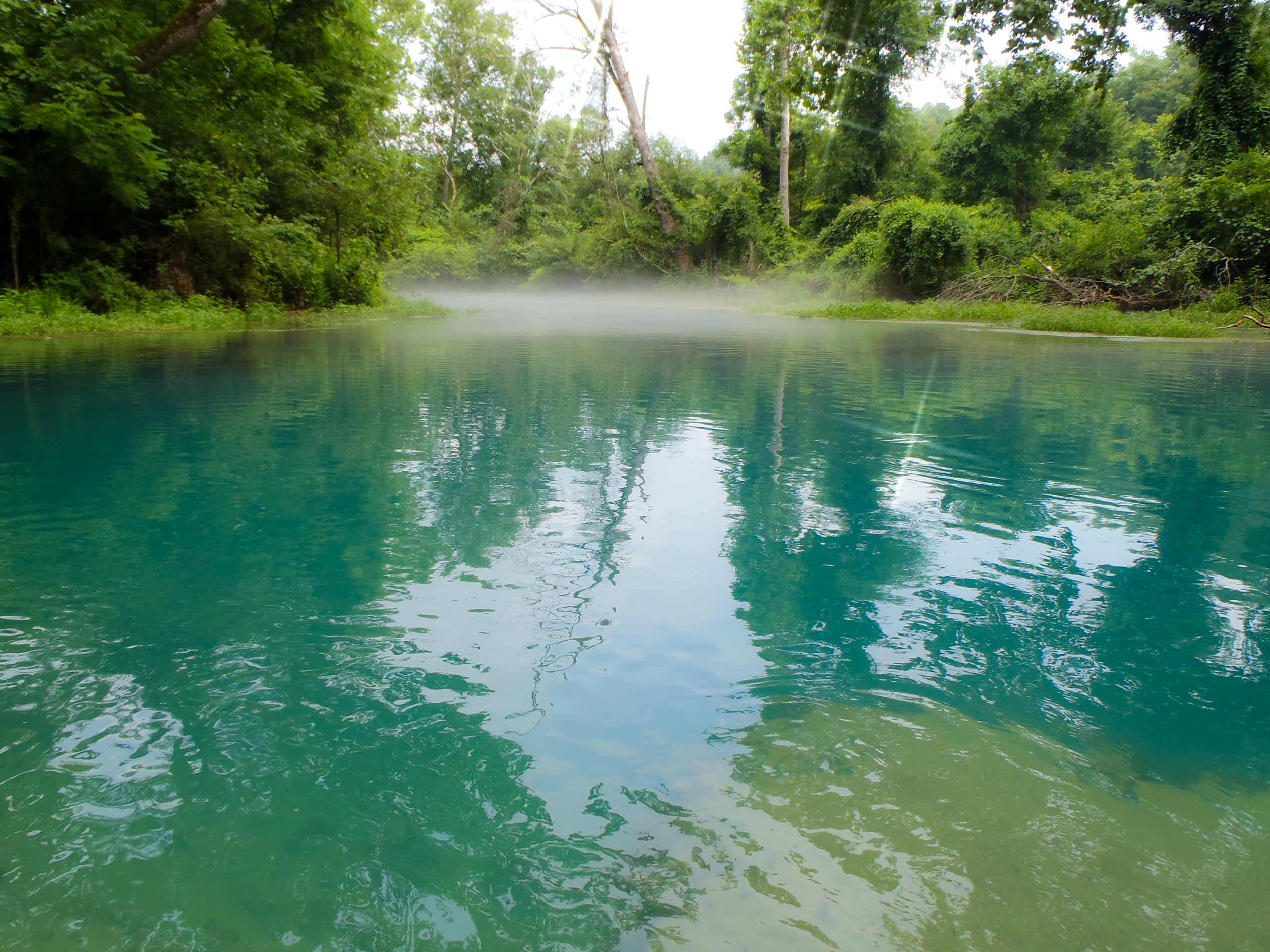
- Eleven Point River, May 2018

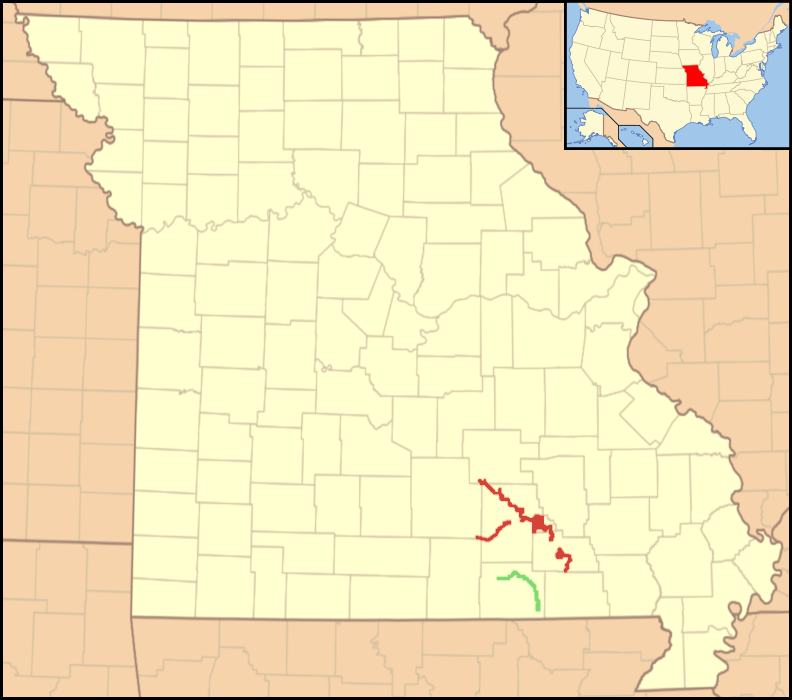
- Location of the Eleven Point Wild and Scenic River shown in green; nearby Ozark National Scenic Riverways in red

Location
- Country: United States
- State: Missouri, Arkansas
- Region: Ozark Plateau, Mississippi Alluvial Plain
- Cities: Willow Springs, Thomasville

Physical characteristics
- Source
  - location: Willow Springs, Howell County, Ozark Plateau, Missouri
- Mouth: Spring River
  - location: Black Rock, Arkansas, Randolph County, Mississippi Alluvial Plain, Arkansas
- Discharge
  - location: Ravenden Springs, Arkansas
  - average: 1,171 cu/ft. per sec.

Basin features
- Tributaries
  - left: Spring Creek, Hurricane Creek
  - right: Middle Creek, Greer Spring, Long Hollow Creek, Frederick Creek, Blue Spring, Diles Creek

National Wild and Scenic River
- Type: Scenic
- Designated: October 2, 1968

The Eleven Point River is a 138-mile-long (222 km) river in southern Missouri and northern Arkansas, United States.

== Eleven Point ==
While the river originates near Willow Springs, Missouri, it is generally a losing stream upstream of the confluence with the Middle Fork of the Eleven Point near Thomasville, Missouri. It more than doubles in flow when Greer Spring Branch runs into it, adding over 200 million US gallons (760,000 m^{3}) of water per day to the river. The name derives from the Mississippi Valley French word pointe, which is a wooded point of land marking a river bend. Voyageurs marked distance by counting these points of land or river bends. The river flows into the Spring River southwest of Pocahontas near the small town of Black Rock.

In 1968 a 44.4-mile (71.5 km) stretch was named the Eleven Point National Wild and Scenic River, one of the original eight rivers chosen to be part of the United States National Wild and Scenic Rivers System.

== Pine Hollow ==
Pine Hollow is a valley in Oregon County in the U.S. state of Missouri. Pine Hollow was so named for the pine trees that grow in the valley.

== See also ==
- List of Missouri rivers
- Irish Wilderness
- List of Arkansas rivers
