= Oregon County, Missouri =

County in Missouri, U.S.

- County
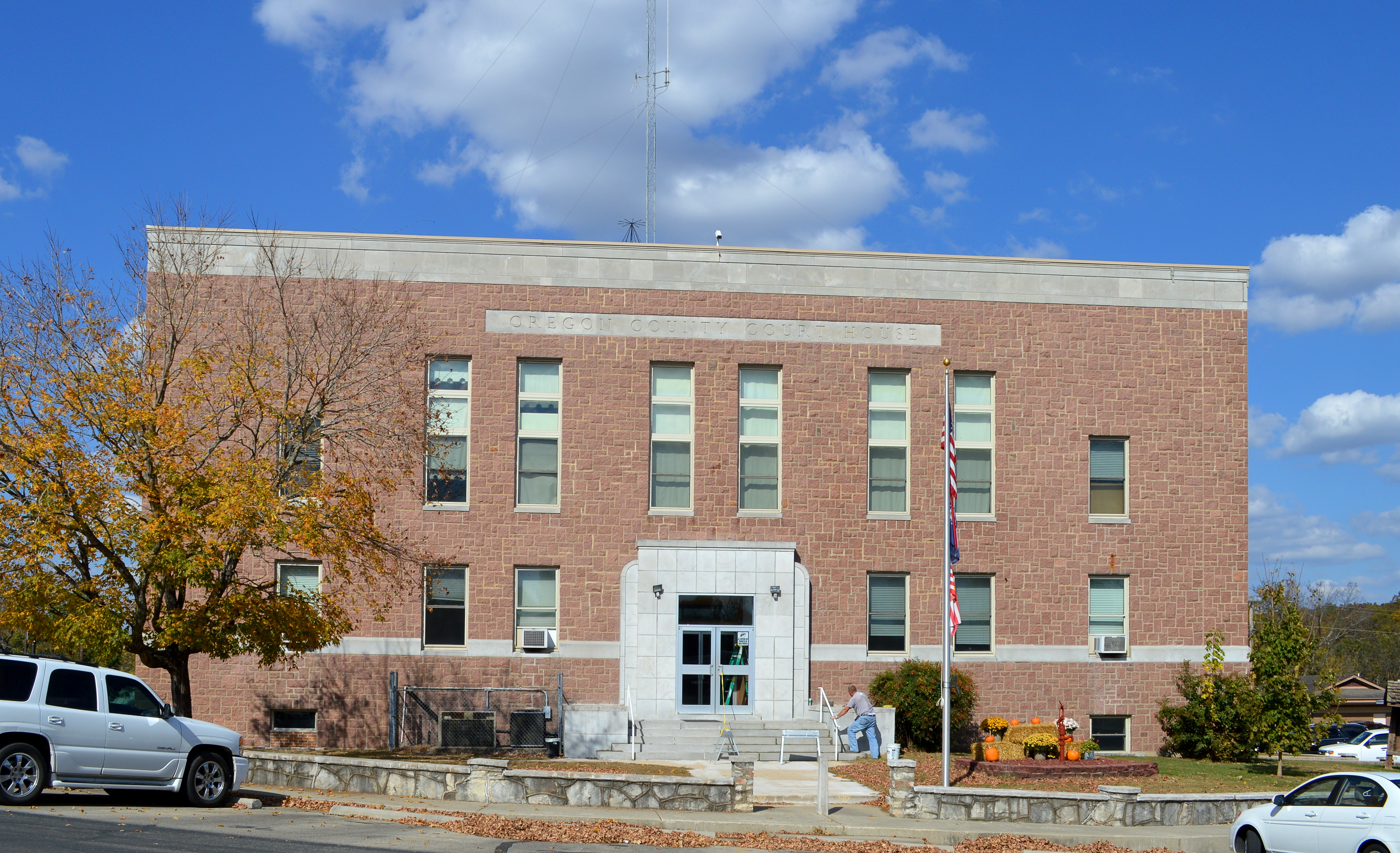
- Oregon County Courthouse in Alton

- Location within the U.S. state of Missouri
- Coordinates: 36°41′N 91°24′W
- Country: United States
- State: Missouri
- Founded: February 14, 1845
- Named for: Oregon Country
- Seat: Alton
- Largest city: Thayer

Area
  - Total: 792 sq mi (2,050 km^{2})
  - Land: 790 sq mi (2,000 km^{2})
  - Water: 1.7 sq mi (4.4 km^{2}) 0.2%

Population (2020)
  - Total: 8,635
  - Estimate (2025): 8,709 ▲
  - Density: 11/sq mi (4.2/km^{2})
- Time zone: UTC−6 (Central)
  - Summer (DST): UTC−5 (CDT)
- Congressional district: 8th

Oregon County is a county located in the southern portion of the U.S. state of Missouri. As of the 2020 census, the population was 8,635. Its county seat is Alton. The county was officially organized on February 14, 1845, and was named for the Oregon Country, a region shared at the time between the United Kingdom and the United States.

Home to a large area of the Mark Twain National Forest, Oregon County contains more national forest acreage than any county in the state of Missouri. It also contains the Irish Wilderness, the largest federally protected wilderness area in the state. Hiking, backpacking, and horseback riding opportunities abound on the Ozark Trail and the White's Creek Trail. Canoeing, kayaking, jonboating, and fishing are popular on the Eleven Point River, which is Missouri's only National Wild and Scenic River.

Eleven Point State Park is under development east of Alton, Missouri that includes 5.5 miles of Eleven Point River frontage.

== History ==
Oregon County was created in 1845, at a time when the Oregon boundary dispute was a major issue.

== Geography ==
The county has a total area of 792 square miles (2,050 km^{2}), of which 790 square miles (2,000 km^{2}) is land and 1.7 square miles (4.4 km^{2}) (0.2%) is water. Arkansas is located to the south of Oregon County.

Grand Gulf State Park, just west of Thayer, was deemed a National Natural Landmark by the National Park Service, and is an example of karst topography.

=== Adjacent counties ===
- Shannon County (north)
- Carter County (northeast)
- Ripley County (east)
- Randolph County, Arkansas (southeast)
- Sharp County, Arkansas (south)
- Fulton County, Arkansas (southwest)
- Howell County (west)

=== Major highways ===
- U.S. Route 63
- U.S. Route 160
- Route 19
- Route 99
- Route 142

=== National protected area ===
- Mark Twain National Forest (part)

== Demographics ==
Historical population
Census	Pop.	Note	%±
1850	1,432		—
1860	3,009		110.1%
1870	3,287		9.2%
1880	5,791		76.2%
1890	10,467		80.7%
1900	13,906		32.9%
1910	14,681		5.6%
1920	12,889		−12.2%
1930	12,220		−5.2%
1940	13,390		9.6%
1950	11,978		−10.5%
1960	9,845		−17.8%
1970	9,180		−6.8%
1980	10,238		11.5%
1990	9,470		−7.5%
2000	10,344		9.2%
2010	10,881		5.2%
2020	8,635		−20.6%
2025 (est.)	8,709	▲	0.9%
U.S. Decennial Census; 1790-1960 1900-1990; 1990-2000 2010-2015

=== 2020 census ===
As of the 2020 census, the county had a population of 8,635. The median age was 47.5 years. 21.9% of residents were under the age of 18 and 24.9% of residents were 65 years of age or older. For every 100 females there were 96.4 males, and for every 100 females age 18 and over there were 95.2 males age 18 and over.

The racial makeup recorded in the redistricting data was 92.5% White, 0.3% Black or African American, 0.75% Native American, 0.1% Asian, 0.0% Pacific Islander, and 5.0% other or mixed races; Hispanic or Latino residents of any race comprised 1.35% of the population.

Oregon County Racial Composition
Race	Num.	Perc.
White (NH)	7,990	92.5%
Black or African American (NH)	25	0.3%
Native American (NH)	65	0.75%
Asian (NH)	8	0.1%
Pacific Islander (NH)	0	0%
Other/Mixed (NH)	430	5%
Hispanic or Latino	117	1.35%

0.0% of residents lived in urban areas, while 100.0% lived in rural areas.

There were 3,671 households in the county, of which 25.6% had children under the age of 18 living with them and 26.3% had a female householder with no spouse or partner present. About 31.8% of all households were made up of individuals and 16.9% had someone living alone who was 65 years of age or older.

There were 4,316 housing units, of which 14.9% were vacant. Among occupied housing units, 74.3% were owner-occupied and 25.7% were renter-occupied. The homeowner vacancy rate was 2.4% and the rental vacancy rate was 12.7%.

=== 2000 census ===
As of the 2000 census, there was 10,344 people, 4,263 households, and 3,018 families residing in the county. The population density was 13 people per square mile (5.0 people/km^{2}). There were 4,997 housing units at an average density of 6 units per square mile (2.3/km^{2}). The racial makeup of the county was 94.61% White, 0.10% Black or African American, 2.88% Native American, 0.14% Asian, 0.01% Pacific Islander, 0.08% from other races, and 2.19% from two or more races. Approximately 1.09% of the population were Hispanic or Latino of any race. Among the major first ancestries reported in Oregon County were 29.7% American, 13.4% English, 13.1% Irish, and 13.0% German.

There were 4,263 households, out of which 29.30% had children under the age of 18 living with them, 58.80% were married couples living together, 8.40% had a female householder with no husband present, and 29.20% were non-families. 26.20% of all households were made up of individuals, and 13.90% had someone living alone who was 65 years of age or older. The average household size was 2.40 and the average family size was 2.86.

In the county, the population was spread out, with 24.30% under the age of 18, 7.00% from 18 to 24, 24.10% from 25 to 44, 26.50% from 45 to 64, and 18.00% who were 65 years of age or older. The median age was 41 years. For every 100 females there were 96.40 males. For every 100 women age 18 and over, there were 92.80 men.

The median income for a household in the county was $26,119, and the median income for a family was $31,637. Males had a median income of $22,304 versus $16,353 for females. The per capita income for the county was $15,043. About 16.30% of families and 22.00% of the population were below the poverty line, including 28.20% of those under age 18 and 20.00% of those age 65 or over. Of the state's 115 counties, in 2010 Oregon ranked last in terms of poverty.

== Politics ==
=== Local ===
Oregon County, Missouri

Elected countywide officials
Assessor	Doug Bridges	Republican
Circuit Clerk	Betty Grooms	Republican
County Clerk	Tracy Bridges	Democratic
Collector	Misty Hower	Democratic
Commissioner (presiding)	David Stubblefield	Republican
Commissioner (district 1)	Jason Kemper	Republican
Commissioner (district 2)	Terry Cline	Republican
Coroner	Tom Clary	Democratic
Prosecuting Attorney	Justin Kelley	Republican
Public Administrator	Becky Granger	Republican
Recorder	Dawn Holman	Democratic
Sheriff	Eric King	Republican
Surveyor	Scott Simer	Democratic
Treasurer	Linda Parrott	Republican

Political control at the county level is currently divided between the Democratic and Republican parties.

=== State ===
All of Oregon County is a part of the 143rd District in the Missouri House of Representatives and is currently represented by Jeffrey Pogue (R-Salem).

Missouri House of Representatives — District 143 — Oregon County (2016)
Party	Candidate	Votes	%	±%
Republican	Jeffrey Pogue	3,801	100.00%	

Missouri House of Representatives — District 143 — Oregon County (2014)
Party	Candidate	Votes	%	±%
Republican	Jeffrey Pogue	1,948	100.00%	+35.32%

Missouri House of Representatives — District 143 — Oregon County (2012)
Party	Candidate	Votes	%	±%
Republican	Jeffrey Pogue	2,767	64.68%	
Democratic	Shane Van Steenis	1,511	35.32%	

All of Oregon County is a part of Missouri's 33rd District in the Missouri Senate and is currently represented by Mike Cunningham (R-Rogersville).

Missouri Senate — District 33 — Oregon County (2016)
Party	Candidate	Votes	%	±%
Republican	Mike Cunningham	3,833	100.00%	

Missouri Senate — District 33 — Oregon County (2012)
Party	Candidate	Votes	%	±%
Republican	Mike Cunningham	3,428	100.00%	

Past Gubernatorial Elections Results
Year	Republican	Democratic	Third Parties
2024	82.19% 3,715	15.82% 715	1.99% 90
2020	80.42% 3,770	17.92% 840	1.66% 78
2016	66.82% 3,081	30.04% 1,385	3.14% 145
2012	50.01% 2,200	46.85% 2,061	3.14% 138
2008	38.07% 1,742	59.22% 2,710	2.71% 124
2004	55.76% 2,579	42.16% 1,950	2.08% 96
2000	45.82% 1,938	51.70% 2,187	2.48% 105
1996	38.02% 1,466	59.23% 2,284	2.75% 106
1992	39.27% 1,635	60.73% 2,529	0.00% 0
1988	53.00% 1,978	46.60% 1,739	0.40% 15
1984	52.93% 2,087	47.07% 1,856	0.00% 0
1980	40.12% 1,542	59.82% 2,299	0.05% 2
1976	37.19% 1,350	62.73% 2,277	0.08% 3

=== Federal ===
U.S. Senate — Missouri — Oregon County (2016)
Party	Candidate	Votes	%	±%
Republican	Roy Blunt	3,031	65.45%	+17.88
Democratic	Jason Kander	1,385	29.91%	−16.59
Libertarian	Jonathan Dine	105	2.27%	−3.66
Green	Johnathan McFarland	53	1.14%	+1.14
Constitution	Fred Ryman	57	1.23%	+1.23

U.S. Senate — Missouri — Oregon County (2012)
Party	Candidate	Votes	%	±%
Republican	Todd Akin	2,095	47.57%	
Democratic	Claire McCaskill	2,048	46.50%	
Libertarian	Jonathan Dine	261	5.93%	

Oregon County is included in Missouri's 8th Congressional District and is currently represented by Jason T. Smith (R-Salem) in the U.S. House of Representatives. Smith won a special election on Tuesday, June 4, 2013, to finish out the remaining term of U.S. Representative Jo Ann Emerson (R-Cape Girardeau). Emerson announced her resignation a month after being reelected with over 70 percent of the vote in the district. She resigned to become CEO of the National Rural Electric Cooperative.

U.S. House of Representatives — Missouri's 8th Congressional District — Oregon County (2016)
Party	Candidate	Votes	%	±%
Republican	Jason T. Smith	3,447	77.50%	+17.05
Democratic	Dave Cowell	876	19.69%	−4.52
Libertarian	Jonathan Shell	125	2.81%	+1.15

U.S. House of Representatives — Missouri's 8th Congressional District — Oregon County (2014)
Party	Candidate	Votes	%	±%
Republican	Jason T. Smith	1,458	60.45%	+1.40
Democratic	Barbara Stocker	584	24.21%	−6.35
Constitution	Doug Enyart	76	3.15%	−6.11
Libertarian	Rick Vandeven	40	1.66%	+0.53
Independent	Terry Hampton	254	10.53%	+10.53

U.S. House of Representatives — Missouri's 8th Congressional District — Oregon County (Special Election 2013)
Party	Candidate	Votes	%	±%
Republican	James T. Smith	574	59.05%	−11.37
Democratic	Steve Hodges	297	30.56%	+5.19
Constitution	Doug Enyart	90	9.26%	+9.26
Libertarian	Bill Slantz	11	1.13%	−3.08

U.S. House of Representatives — Missouri's 8th Congressional District — Oregon County (2012)
Party	Candidate	Votes	%	±%
Republican	Jo Ann Emerson	3,061	70.42%	
Democratic	Jack Rushin	1,103	25.37%	
Libertarian	Rick Vandeven	183	4.21%	

==== Political culture ====
United States presidential election results for Oregon County, Missouri
Year	Republican		Democratic		Third party(ies)	
Year	No.	%	No.	%	No.	%
1888	360	23.61%	1,157	75.87%	8	0.52%
1892	318	19.64%	1,118	69.05%	183	11.30%
1896	576	24.36%	1,783	75.39%	6	0.25%
1900	652	26.42%	1,768	71.64%	48	1.94%
1904	693	33.72%	1,215	59.12%	147	7.15%
1908	729	30.31%	1,550	64.45%	126	5.24%
1912	486	18.12%	1,688	62.94%	508	18.94%
1916	660	25.92%	1,799	70.66%	87	3.42%
1920	1,319	39.57%	1,961	58.84%	53	1.59%
1924	896	25.70%	2,231	63.98%	360	10.32%
1928	1,662	46.82%	1,884	53.07%	4	0.11%
1932	786	17.77%	3,599	81.37%	38	0.86%
1936	1,461	29.40%	3,504	70.50%	5	0.10%
1940	1,826	33.60%	3,593	66.12%	15	0.28%
1944	1,573	36.46%	2,734	63.38%	7	0.16%
1948	1,214	27.86%	3,133	71.91%	10	0.23%
1952	1,804	38.03%	2,926	61.68%	14	0.30%
1956	1,436	36.75%	2,472	63.25%	0	0.00%
1960	1,974	50.51%	1,934	49.49%	0	0.00%
1964	992	25.44%	2,908	74.56%	0	0.00%
1968	1,213	34.03%	1,726	48.43%	625	17.54%
1972	2,118	61.04%	1,352	38.96%	0	0.00%
1976	1,122	30.23%	2,564	69.07%	26	0.70%
1980	1,523	39.07%	2,326	59.67%	49	1.26%
1984	1,979	49.41%	2,026	50.59%	0	0.00%
1988	1,717	45.59%	2,042	54.22%	7	0.19%
1992	1,402	33.10%	2,258	53.31%	576	13.60%
1996	1,502	39.10%	1,795	46.73%	544	14.16%
2000	2,521	59.56%	1,568	37.04%	144	3.40%
2004	2,769	59.26%	1,823	39.01%	81	1.73%
2008	2,652	57.77%	1,811	39.45%	128	2.79%
2012	2,886	65.28%	1,419	32.10%	116	2.62%
2016	3,671	78.64%	865	18.53%	132	2.83%
2020	3,847	81.18%	823	17.37%	69	1.46%
2024	3,884	84.20%	696	15.09%	33	0.72%

At the presidential level, Oregon County was solidly Democratic from its founding in 1845 through 1996; in 1960, Richard Nixon became the first Republican ever to carry the county, but, aside from Nixon's landslide over McGovern in 1972, it would not go Republican again until 2000, when it voted for George W. Bush. It voted Republican again in the next two elections, 2004 and 2008, although the Republican vote share shrank slightly in both elections. In 2012, Mitt Romney became the first Republican since 1972 to break 60% in the county; in 2016, Donald Trump became the first Republican to exceed 70%; and in 2020, Trump became the first Republican to exceed 80%. The county has voted Republican for six elections straight as of 2020.

Like most rural areas throughout Southeast Missouri, voters in Oregon County generally adhere to socially and culturally conservative principles. In 2004, Missourians voted on a constitutional amendment to define marriage as the union between a man and a woman—it overwhelmingly passed Oregon County with 87.09 percent of the vote. The initiative passed the state with 71 percent of support from voters as Missouri became the first state to ban same-sex marriage. In 2006, Missourians voted on a constitutional amendment to fund and legalize embryonic stem cell research in the state—it failed in Oregon County with 56.78 percent voting against the measure. The initiative narrowly passed the state with 51 percent of support from voters as Missouri became one of the first states in the nation to approve embryonic stem cell research. Despite Oregon County's longstanding tradition of supporting socially conservative platforms, voters in the county have a penchant for advancing populist causes like increasing the minimum wage. In 2006, Missourians voted on a proposition (Proposition B) to increase the minimum wage in the state to $6.50 an hour—it passed Oregon County with 73.14 percent of the vote. The proposition strongly passed every single county in Missouri with 75.94 percent voting in favor as the minimum wage was increased to $6.50 an hour in the state. During the same election, voters in five other states also strongly approved increases in the minimum wage.

=== Missouri presidential preference primary (2008) ===
In the 2008 presidential primary, voters in Oregon County from both political parties supported candidates who finished in second place in the state at large and nationally. Former U.S. Senator Hillary Clinton (D-New York) received more votes, a total of 989, than any candidate from either party in Oregon County during the 2008 presidential primary.

== Education ==
Of adults 25 years of age and older in Oregon County, 72.0% possesses a high school diploma or higher while 9.1% holds a bachelor's degree or higher as their highest educational attainment.

=== Public schools ===
- Alton R-IV School District - Alton
  - Alton Elementary School (K-06)
  - Alton High School (07-12)
- Couch R-I School District - Myrtle
  - Couch Elementary School (K-06)
  - Couch High School (07-12)
- Oregon-Howell R-III School District - Koshkonong
  - Koshkonong Elementary School (K-06)
  - Koshkonong High School (07-12)
- Thayer R-II School District - Thayer
  - Thayer Elementary School (K-06)
  - Thayer High School (07-12)

=== Public libraries ===
- Oregon County Library District

== Communities ==
=== Cities ===
- Alton (county seat)
- Koshkonong
- Thayer

=== Census-designated place ===
- Thomasville

=== Other unincorporated places ===
- Bardley
- Billmore
- Braswell
- Brawley
- Calm
- Clifton
- Corona
- Couch
- Deckard-Y
- Farewell
- Garfield
- Greer
- Griswold
- Guiteau
- Hollis
- Huddleston
- Jeff
- Jobe
- Lulu
- Many Springs
- Midway
- Myrtle
- Rover
- Royal Oak
- Wilderness
- Woodside

== See also ==
- National Register of Historic Places listings in Oregon County, Missouri
