= Needmore, Ste. Genevieve County, Missouri =

Needmore, Missouri
- unincorporated community
- Location of Ste. Genevieve County, Missouri
- Coordinates: 38°4′18″N 90°14′18″W
- Country: United States
- State: Missouri
- County: Sainte Genevieve
- Township: Jackson
- Elevation: 784 ft (239 m)
- Time zone: UTC-6 (Central (CST))
  - Summer (DST): UTC-5 (CDT)
- ZIP code: 63670
- Area code: 573
- FIPS code: 29-51380
- GNIS feature ID: 723142

Needmore is an unincorporated community in Jackson Township in northern Sainte Genevieve County, Missouri, United States. It is situated approximately 12 miles northwest of Ste. Genevieve. The community was founded in 1905 by workers at the lime plant at Brickey's. The workers had previously lived on company property, and settled Needmore to be more independent from the restrictions imposed on them by the lime plant company. Neighbors often said that the people in the new settlement were always needing more, hence the name.
