= Lawrenceton, Missouri =

Lawrenceton, Missouri Punjaub
- Unincorporated community
- Location of Ste. Genevieve County, Missouri
- Coordinates: 37°57′54″N 90°18′18″W
- Country: United States
- State: Missouri
- County: Sainte Genevieve
- Township: Jackson
- Named for: Henry Lawrence

Lawrenceton is an unincorporated community located in the southern part of Jackson Township in Sainte Genevieve County, Missouri, United States. The town lies 14 miles to the west of Ste. Genevieve.

== Etymology ==
Lawrenceton was named after Henry Lawrence, a businessman who had contributed in the development of the settlement. Henry Lawrence had a flour mill, a farm, and a store, from which mail was delivered. The original name of the settlement was Punjaub, similar in name to the district in India, although there is no explanation for its origin. Some people have tried to explain the name as a corruption of pond job because of a dam built at that location for a water-powered mill.

A post office named Punjaub operated from 1858 to 1877 then was re-named Lawrenceton from 1877 until discontinued 1941.
