= Pikes Peak (Missouri) =

Summit in the U.S. state of Missouri

Coordinates: 37°59′08″N 90°14′20″W

Pikes Peak is a summit in Ste. Genevieve County in the U.S. state of Missouri. The peak has an elevation of 722 feet (220 m).

The peak lies about two miles southwest of Bloomsdale and I-55. The peak is the high point of a complex ridge between Coots Creek and Carpenter Branch extending to the Fourche a Du Clos on the southwest side of Bloomsdale.

Pikes Peak most likely takes its name from the taller Pikes Peak, in the Rocky Mountains.
