= Ste. Genevieve Township, Ste. Genevieve County, Missouri =

Ste. Genevieve Township
- Civil Township
- Location of Ste. Genevieve County
- Coordinates: 37°56′48″N 90°06′53″W
- Country: United States
- State: Missouri
- County: Ste. Genevieve
- Established

Area
  - Total: 128 sq mi (330 km^{2})
  - Land: 125 sq mi (320 km^{2})
  - Water: 4 sq mi (10 km^{2}) 2.72%
- GNIS Feature ID: 767326

Ste. Genevieve Township is a subdivision of Ste. Genevieve County, Missouri, in the United States of America, and is one of the five townships located in Ste. Genevieve County.

== Name ==
The township was named for the city of Ste. Genevieve, which in turn was named for the Catholic saint Genevieve, the patron saint of Paris.

== History ==
The area of Ste. Genevieve Township was the site of the earliest European settlement in Missouri dating back to the early 1700s. The French colonial settlers partially came from Lower Louisiana, Quebec in Canada, and France. These Creole Habitants farmed the rich bottomlands along the Mississippi River, particularly the Grand Champ bottom, while coureur des bois trapped and traded furs. The local economy provided food and goods for the needs of the Upper Louisiana colony and New Orleans. Transportation to New Orleans was made by boat, while local transportation moved on local roads or traces. The King's Road or Kingshighway (French: le Chemin du Roi or Rue Royale) was begun in 1779 and connected the communities and outposts on the west bank of the Mississippi River. The area known today as Ste. Genevieve Township was split between two French colonial districts: Ste. Genevieve District and New Bourbon District. Upper Louisiana was transferred to the United States in 1804, and in 1824 the state of Missouri was carved from the territory. With the creation of Missouri subsequently came the establishment of Ste. Genevieve County. Ste. Genevieve Township was one of two original townships in the county.

== Populated places ==
There are several incorporated and unincorporated communities in Ste. Genevieve Township.

- Copper Mine
- Grayhawk (part)
- Marlo
- Mosher
- Ste. Genevieve
- Weingarten
- Zell

The township also contains a number of churches: Our Lady Help of Christians Catholic Church, and St. Josephs Catholic Church, as well as the following cemeteries:.

== Geography ==
Ste. Genevieve Township is located in the eastern portion of Ste. Genevieve County. A number of streams run through the township: Coal Creek, Copper Mine Creek, Dodge Creek, Hogg Creek, Mill Creek, Mississippi Slough, Mud Branch, Rough Creek, Sugar Bottom Creek. The following lakes are found in the township: Govro Lake, Hook Pond, Lake Ann, Lake Marian, Lake Susan.

== 2000 census ==
The 2000 census shows Ste. Genevieve Township consisting of 8,943 individuals. The racial makeup of the town was 8,756 (97.0%) White, 100 (1.1%) African American, 25 (0.28%) Native American and Alaska Native, 24 (0.27%) Asian, and 1 (0.01%) from two or more races.

=== 2010 census ===
As of the census of 2010, there were 8,991 people, with a population density of 73 per square mile residing in the township. Males make up 4,496 (49.8%) of the population, while females make up 4,528 (50.2%). The median age for men is 38.7 years and for women is 39.7 years. The racial makeup of the town was 8,751 (97.33%) White, 77 (0.86%) African American, 20 (0.22%) Native American and Alaska Native, 41 (0.46%) Asian, and 11 (0.12%) from other races, and 89 (0.99%) from two or more races.

The average household size 2.57 persons. The estimated median household income in 2009 was $48,283 ($40,496 in 1999). 6.0% of the residents have an income below the poverty rate.
