= Thomure, Missouri =

Unincorporated community in Missouri, U.S.

- unincorporated community
- Location of Ste. Genevieve County, Missouri
- Coordinates: 38°0′14″N 90°3′34″W
- Country: United States
- State: Missouri
- County: Sainte Genevieve
- Township: Ste. Genevieve
- Elevation: 387 ft (118 m)
- Time zone: UTC-6 (Central (CST))
  - Summer (DST): UTC-5 (CDT)
- ZIP code: 63670
- Area code: 573
- FIPS code: 29-73078
- GNIS feature ID: 741320

Thomure is an unincorporated community in Ste. Genevieve Township in eastern Sainte Genevieve County, Missouri, United States. It is situated approximately two miles north of Ste. Genevieve. Thomure was established as a railroad siding for river boats and ferries at Little Rock Landing on the Mississippi River. It was named for F. J. Thomure, superintendent of the Mississippi River and Bonne Terre Railroad.
