= Pin Hook Branch =

Stream in the American state of Missouri

Coordinates: 37.968664°N 90.300399°W

Pin Hook Branch is a stream in Ste. Genevieve County in the U.S. state of Missouri. It is a tributary of Fourche a Du Clos.

Pin Hook Branch was so named because its course has an irregular shape, like a pinhook.

== See also ==
- List of rivers of Missouri
