= New Offenburg, Missouri =

Census-designate place in Ste. Genevieve County, Missouri, United States

- Census-designated place
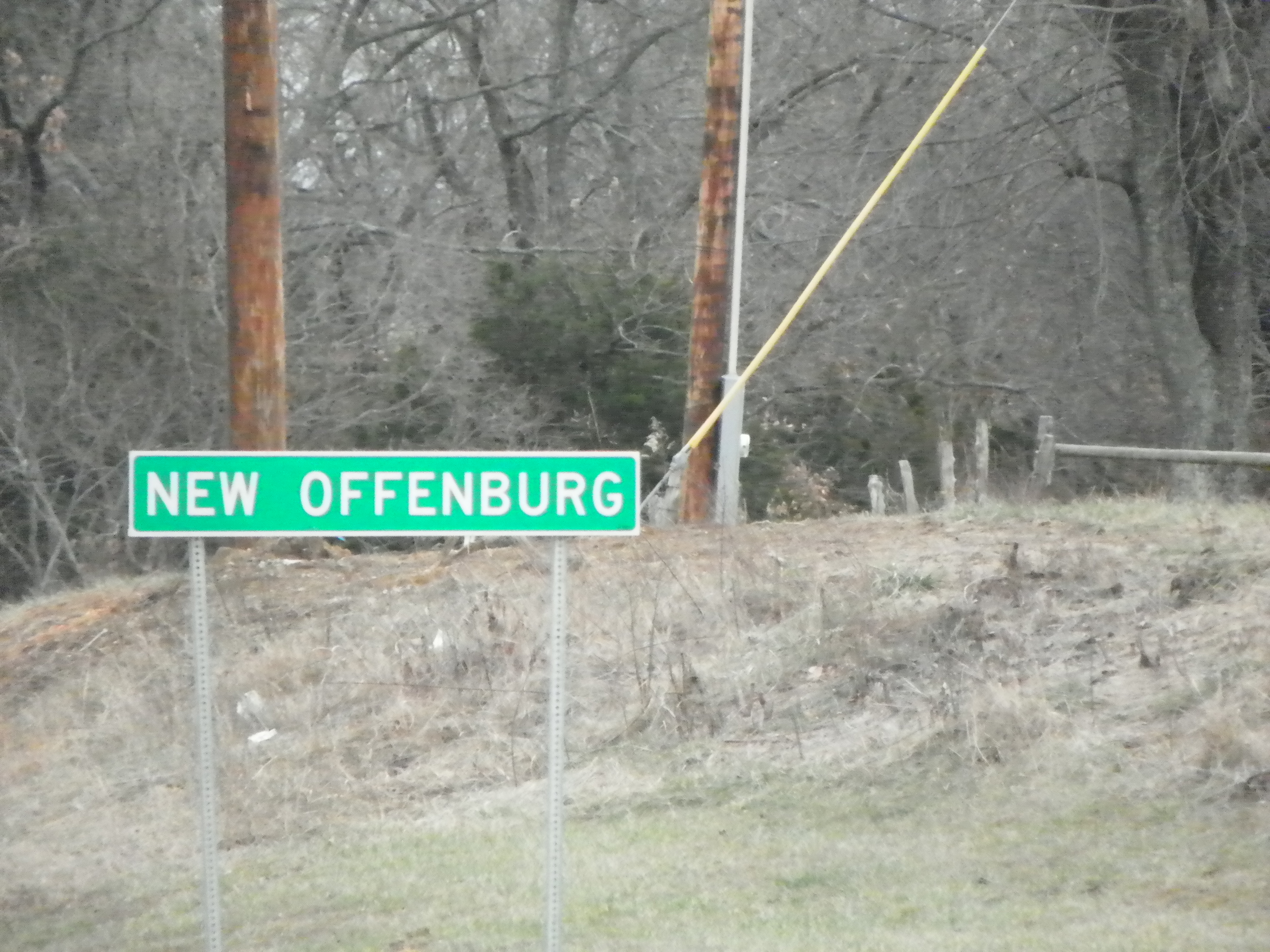
- New Offenburg, Missouri sign

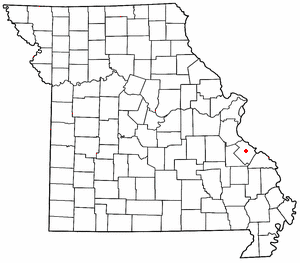
- Location of New Offenburg
- Coordinates: 37°54′31″N 90°11′50″W
- Country: United States
- State: Missouri
- County: Sainte Genevieve
- Elevation: 761 ft (232 m)
- Time zone: UTC-6 (Central (CST))
  - Summer (DST): UTC-5 (CDT)
- ZIP codes: 63661
- Area code: 573
- FIPS code: 29-57116
- GNIS feature ID: 724239

New Offenburg is a census-designated place (CDP) in Sainte Genevieve County, Missouri, Missouri, United States. It is located approximately ten miles southwest of Ste. Genevieve on Route 32.

The community was named after Offenburg, a German city between the Black Forest and the river Rhine, the place where its early settlers originated from.

== History ==
In 1867 the settlers in New Offenburg founded a first Post Office ( Post Office ). The small settlement developed around this post office. New Offenburg was on the Missouri – Illinois Railroad, a major railroad that operated between 1921 and 1978. Today New Offenburg is on Missouri State Route 32.

German-speaking descendants of the immigrants at that time live in New Offenburg to this day and speak a dialect of Baden in addition to American English. Other speakers of the Baden dialects can be found in Weingarten and Zell.

== Geography ==
It is located 10 miles southwest of Ste. Genevieve. It has an altitude of 761 feet (232 meters). Coordinates are 37.9086642°N, -90.1973404°W.

== Climate ==
The climate in this area is characterized by hot, humid summers and generally cool winters. According to the Köppen Climate Classification system, New Offenburg has a humid subtropical climate, abbreviated "Cfa" on climate maps.

Climate data for New Offenburg, MO
Month	Jan	Feb	Mar	Apr	May	Jun	Jul	Aug	Sep	Oct	Nov	Dec	Year
Mean daily maximum °F (°C)	41.0 (5.0)	47.0 (8.3)	57.0 (13.9)	69.0 (20.6)	77.0 (25.0)	85.0 (29.4)	89.0 (31.7)	88.0 (31.1)	80.0 (26.7)	70.0 (21.1)	56.0 (13.3)	45.0 (7.2)	67.0 (19.4)
Daily mean °F (°C)	31.0 (−0.6)	36.0 (2.2)	46.0 (7.8)	57.0 (13.9)	65.0 (18.3)	73.5 (23.1)	78.0 (25.6)	76.0 (24.4)	68.0 (20.0)	57.5 (14.2)	45.5 (7.5)	35.5 (1.9)	55.8 (13.2)
Mean daily minimum °F (°C)	21.0 (−6.1)	25.0 (−3.9)	35.0 (1.7)	45.0 (7.2)	53.0 (11.7)	62.0 (16.7)	67.0 (19.4)	64.0 (17.8)	56.0 (13.3)	45.0 (7.2)	35.0 (1.7)	26.0 (−3.3)	44.5 (7.0)
Average precipitation inches (mm)	2.1 (53)	2.5 (64)	3.9 (99)	4.7 (120)	4.8 (120)	3.4 (86)	4.1 (100)	4.0 (100)	3.2 (81)	3.2 (81)	4.1 (100)	3.4 (86)	43.4 (1,090)
Average snowfall inches (cm)	3.0 (7.6)	3.4 (8.6)	1.8 (4.6)	0.1 (0.25)	0 (0)	0 (0)	0 (0)	0 (0)	0 (0)	0 (0)	0.5 (1.3)	2.7 (6.9)	11.5 (29.25)
Average precipitation days	5	5	9	8	9	7	6	6	6	6	7	6	80
Average snowy days	1	1	0	0	0	0	0	0	0	0	0	1	3
Source: NOAA

== Education ==
New Offenburg is served by the St. Genevieve School District with Ste. Genevieve Sr. High School, Middle and elementary School.

== In Media ==
In 2013, the German documentary filmmaker Johannes Suhm shot the Documentation "New Offenburg - The Last Badeners in the USA" about the residents of the settlement.

== Gallery ==
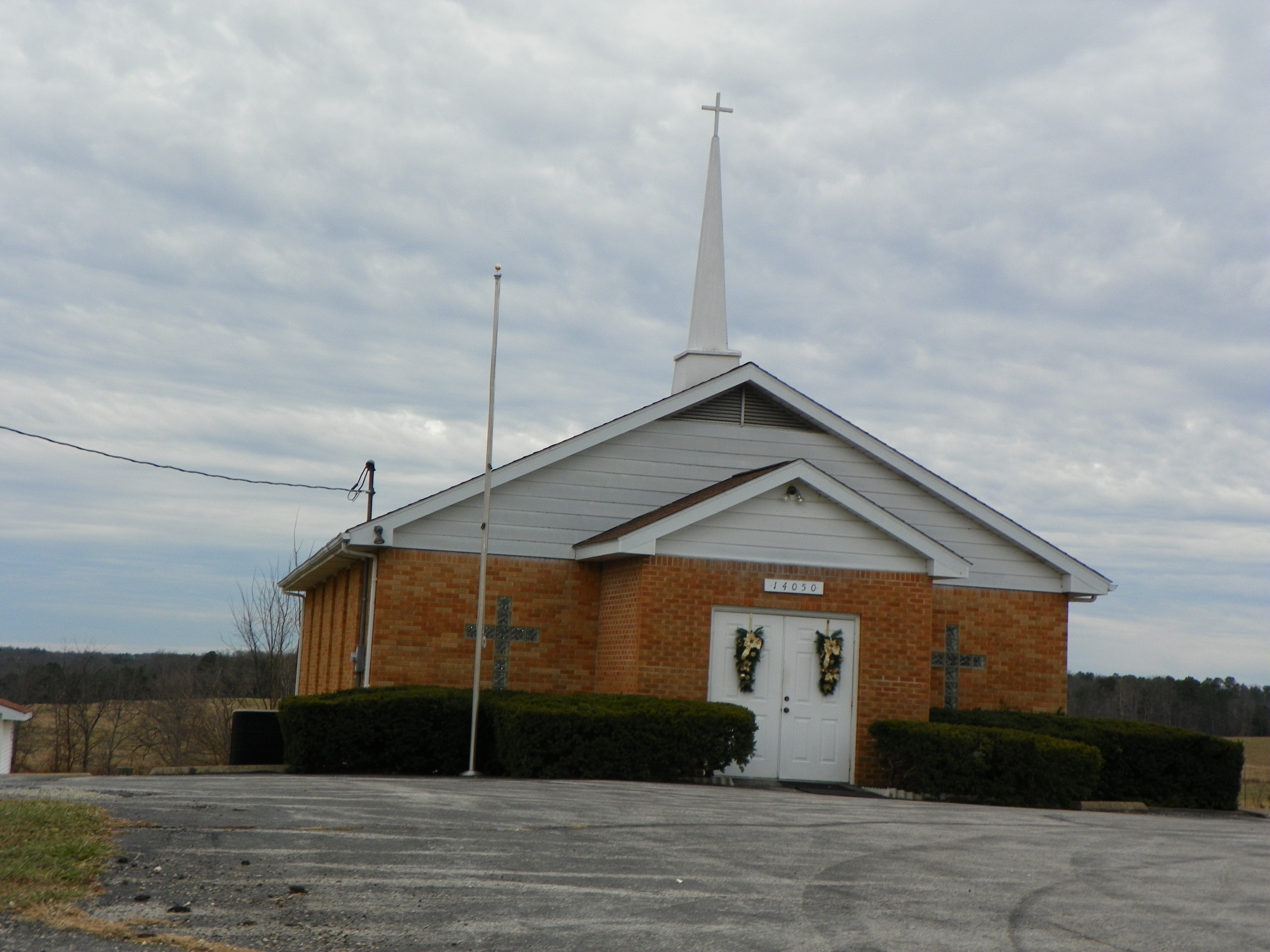
First Baptist Church

== See also ==
- List of census-designated places in Missouri
