= Mosher, Missouri =

Unincorporated community in Missouri, U.S.

- unincorporated community
- Location of Ste. Genevieve County, Missouri
- Coordinates: 37°58′16.1904″N 90°4′36.4074″W
- Country: United States
- State: Missouri
- County: Sainte Genevieve
- Township: Sainte Genevieve
- Elevation: 443 ft (135 m)
- Time zone: UTC-6 (Central (CST))
  - Summer (DST): UTC-5 (CDT)
- ZIP code: 63670
- Area code: 573
- FIPS code: 29-50258
- GNIS feature ID: 721737

Mosher is an unincorporated community in Ste. Genevieve Township in eastern Sainte Genevieve County, Missouri, United States. It is situated approximately two miles west of Ste. Genevieve. The community most likely was named after a local French colonial family Mosier or Mosieur. English spelling of the French pronunciation may account for the spelling of the community's name. The community developed as a stop along the Missouri-Illinois Railroad.
