= Brickey's, Missouri =

Unincorporated community in Missouri, U.S.

Brickey's
- unincorporated community
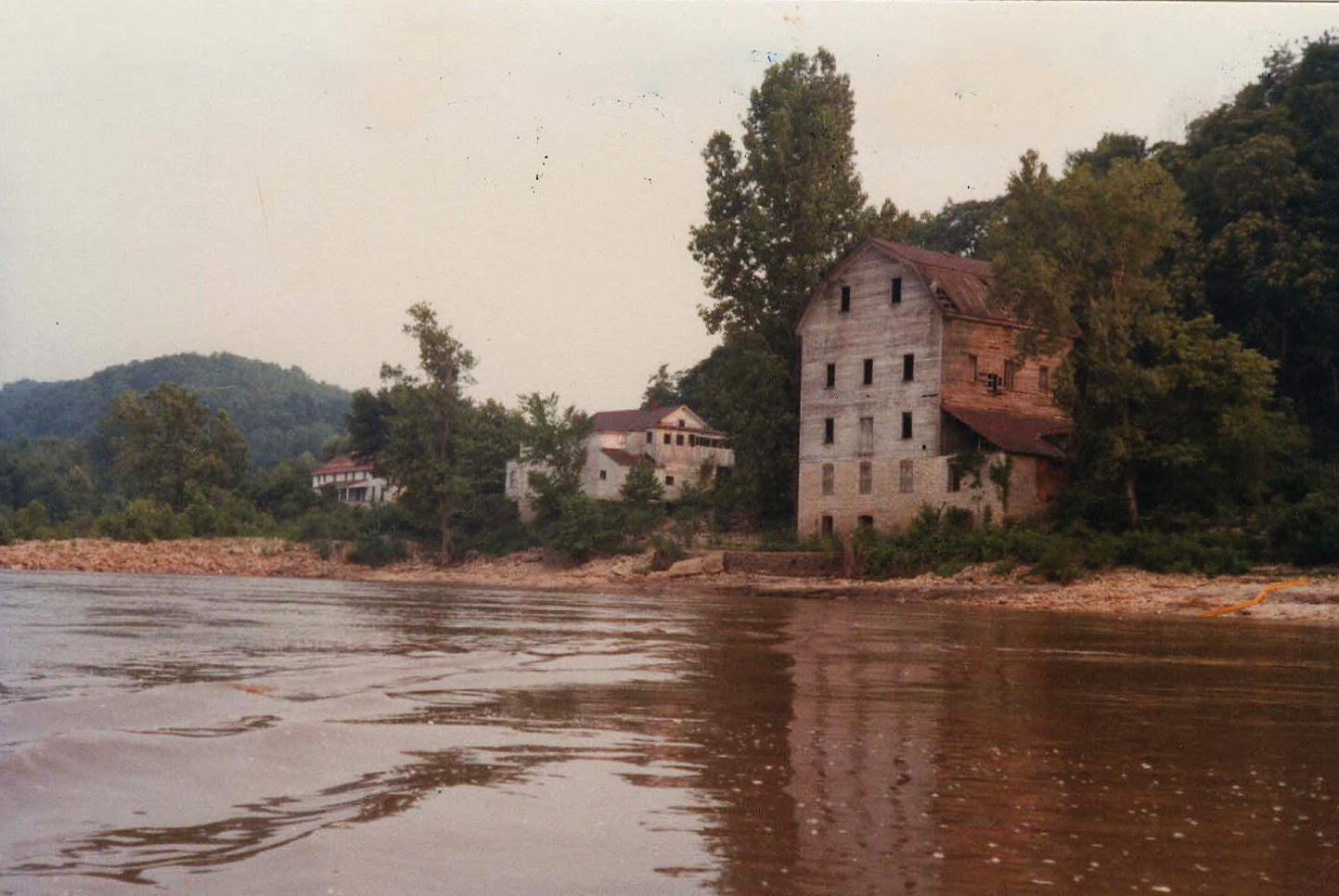
- Brickey's Landing

- Location of Ste. Genevieve County, Missouri
- Coordinates: 38°05′04″N 90°12′38″W
- Country: United States
- State: Missouri
- County: Sainte Genevieve County
- Township: Jackson Township
- GNIS Feature ID: 740692

Brickey's or Brickeys is an unincorporated community located in Jackson Township in Sainte Genevieve County, Missouri, United States. The town lies 11 miles to the northwest of Ste. Genevieve on the Mississippi River.

== History ==
Brickey's was named after John Brickey, who operated a grist mill and a riverboat landing on the Mississippi River at the location. The full name was originally Brickey's Landing.

A post office called Brickeys was established in 1906, and remained in operation until 1953.

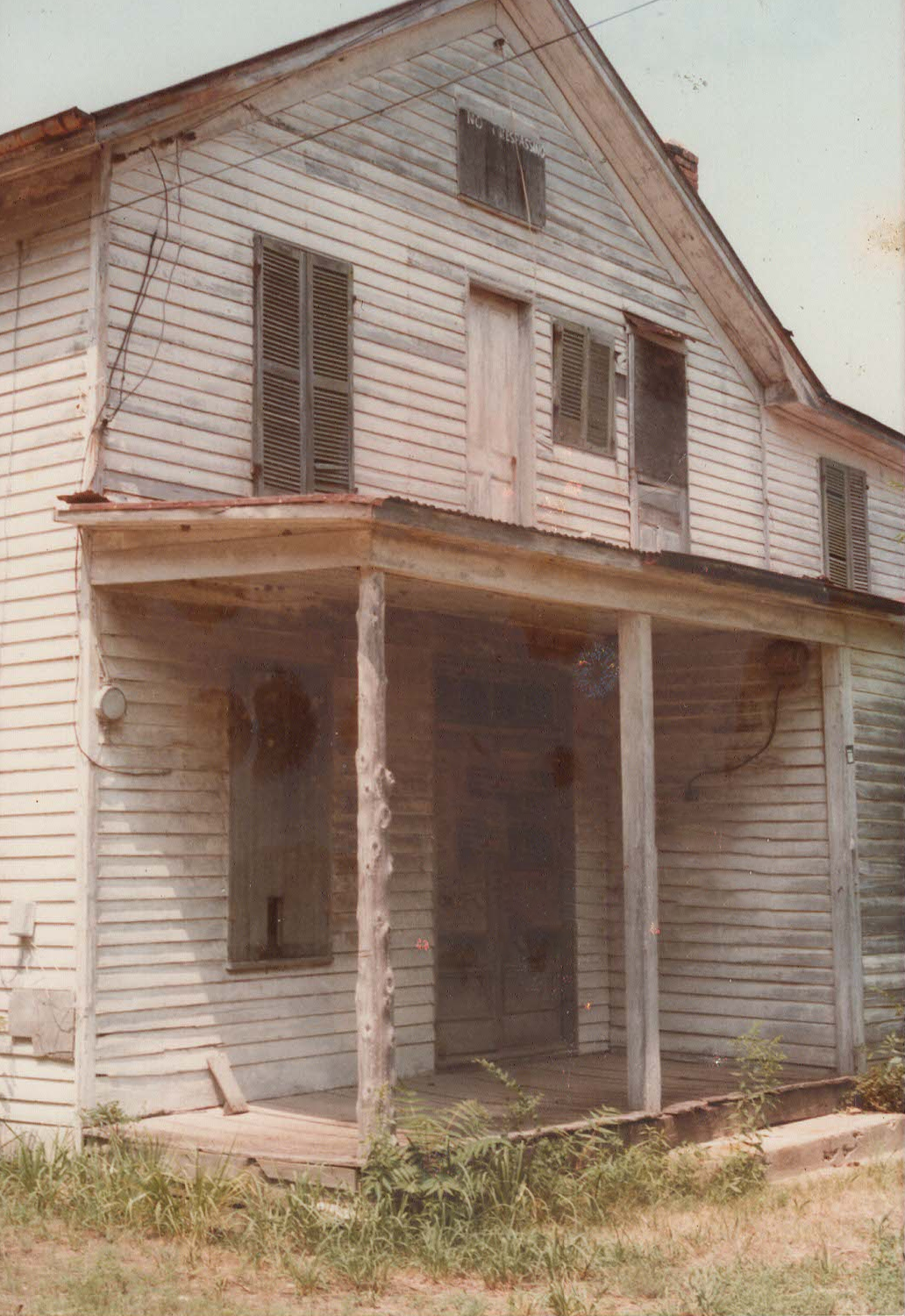
Brickey's Landing Post Office and General Store, c. 1978

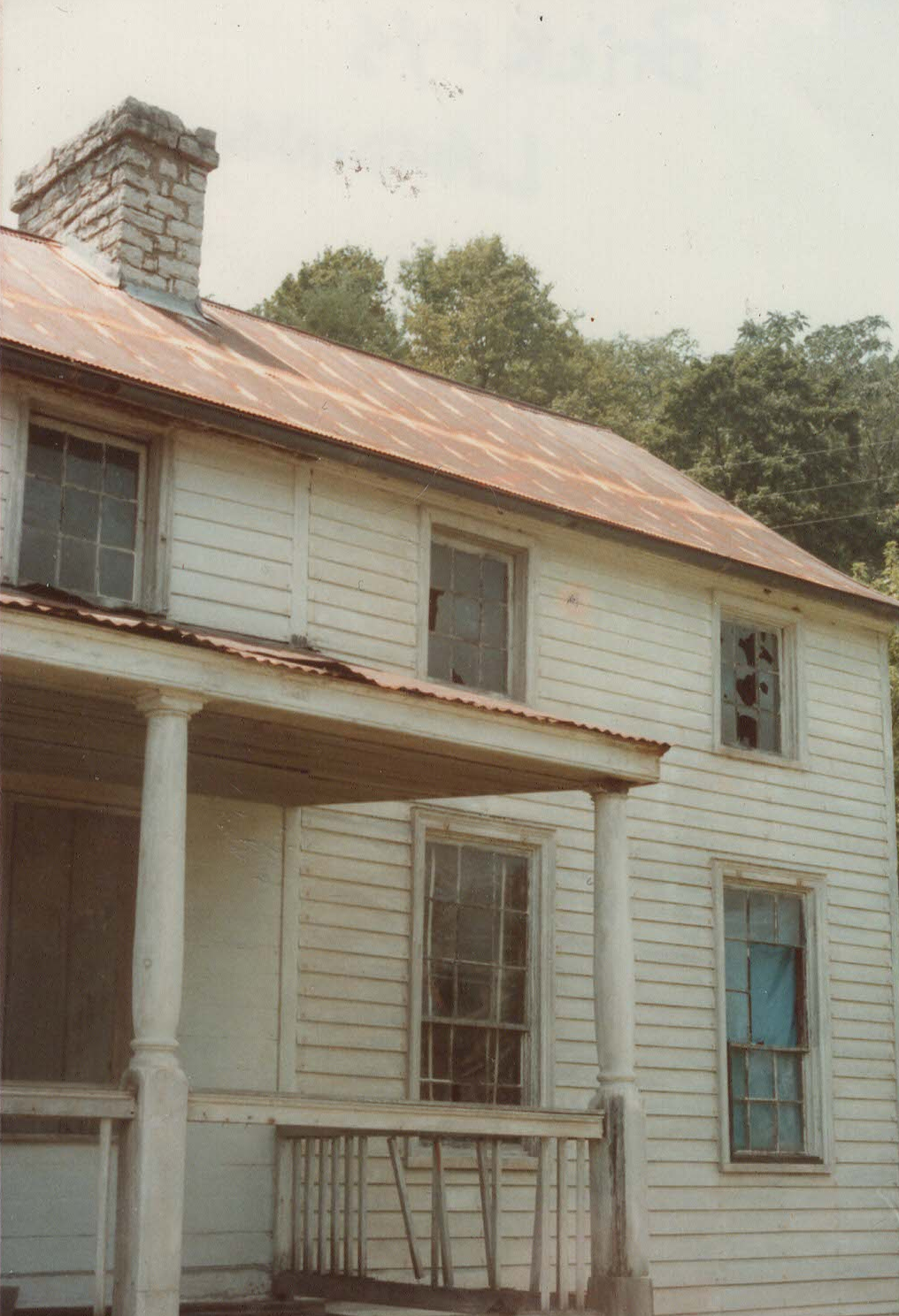
Brickey's Landing boarding house porch detail, c. 1978

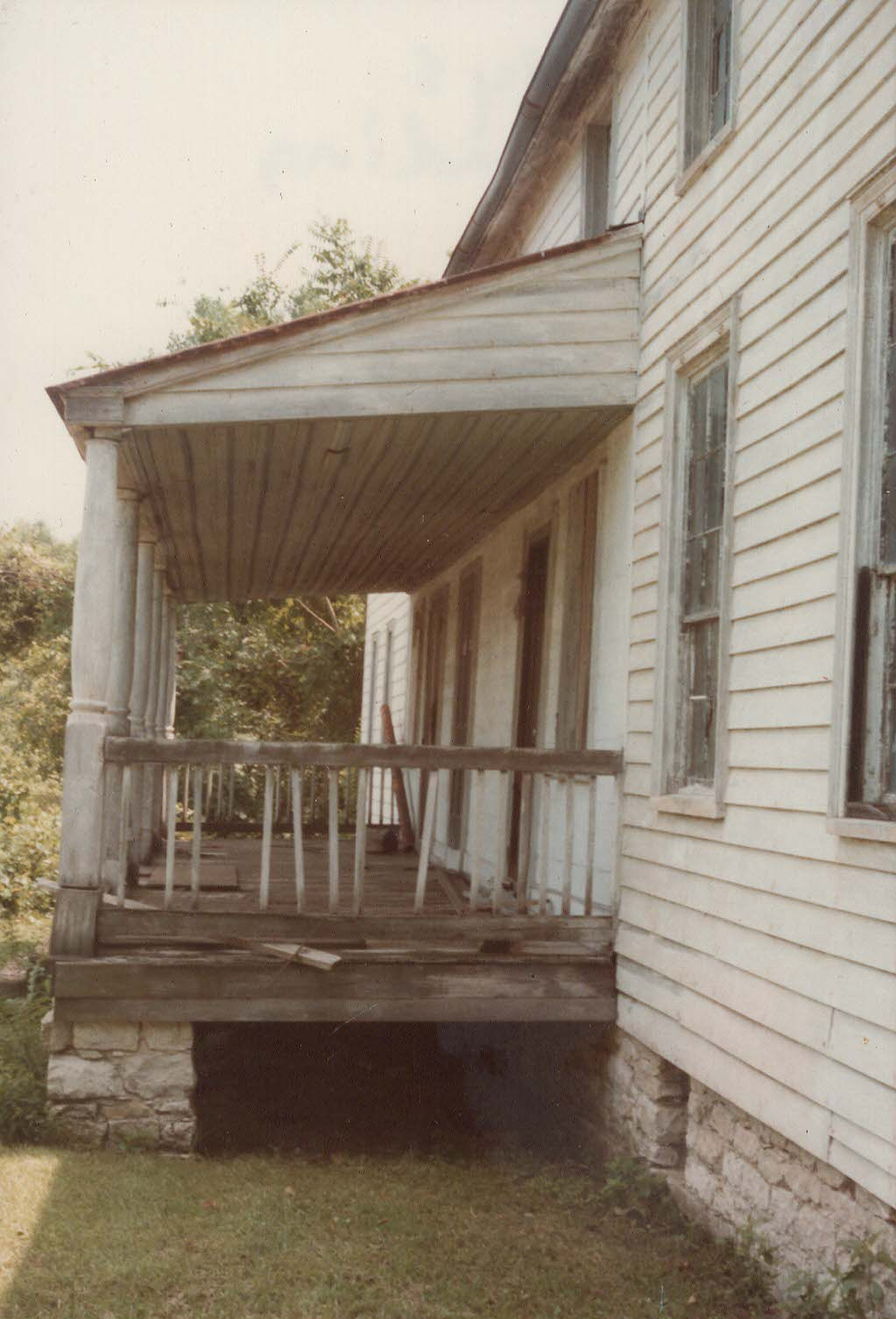
Brickey's Landing boarding house porch detail, c. 1978

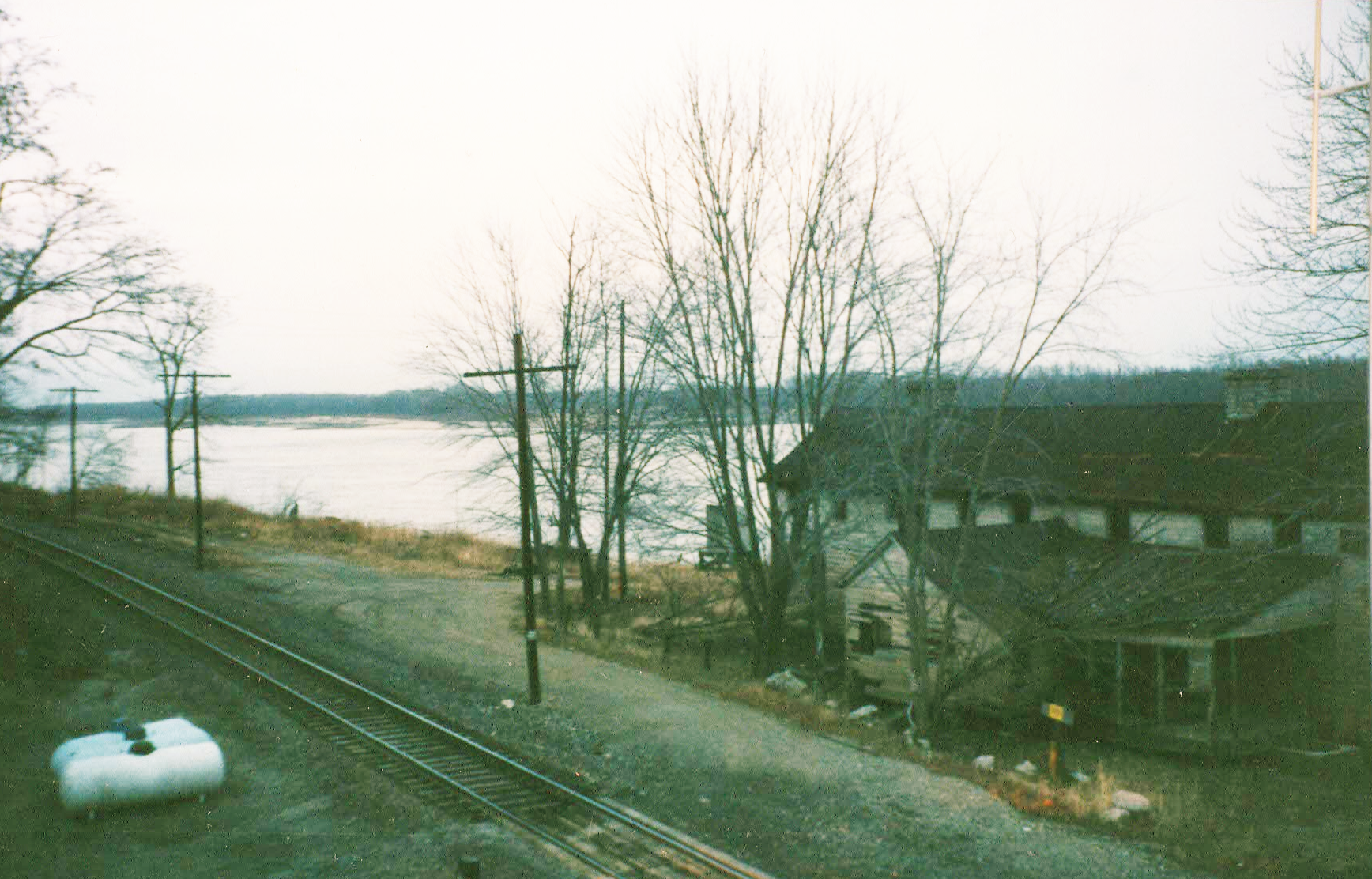
Last remaining photo of building at Brickey's Landing, c. 1989

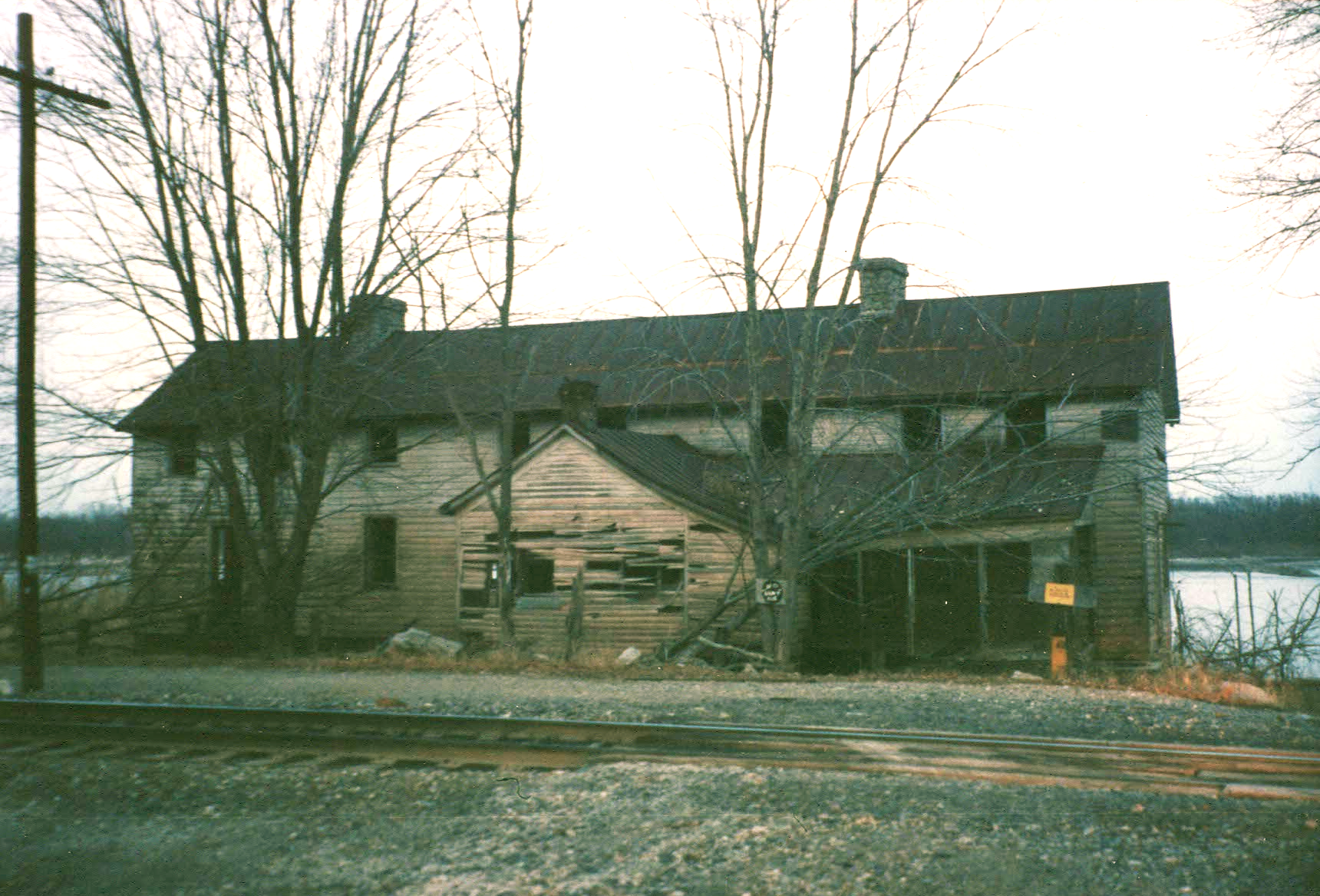
Brickey's Landing boarding house, c. 1989
