= Taylor Branch (Wolf Creek tributary) =

Stream in the US state of Missouri

Coordinates: 37.792274°N 90.372066°W

Taylor Branch is a stream in St. Francois and Ste. Genevieve Counties in the U.S. state of Missouri. It is a tributary of Wolf Creek.

A variant name was "Taylor Creek". Taylor Branch has the name of George Taylor, a pioneer settler.

== See also ==
- List of rivers of Missouri
