= New Bourbon, Missouri =

- Abandoned village
- Location of Ste. Genevieve County, Missouri
- Coordinates: 37°56′59″N 90°01′15″W
- Country: United States
- State: Missouri
- County: Ste. Genevieve
- Township: Ste. Genevieve
- Elevation: 436 ft (133 m)
- Time zone: UTC-6 (Central (CST))
  - Summer (DST): UTC-5 (CDT)
- ZIP code: 63670
- Area code: 573
- FIPS code: 29-51705
- GNIS feature ID: 741096

New Bourbon (French: Nouvelle Bourbon) is an abandoned village located in Ste. Genevieve Township in Ste. Genevieve County, Missouri, United States. New Bourbon is located approximately two and one-half miles south of Ste. Genevieve.

== Etymology ==
New Bourbon, originally called Nouvelle Bourbon, was named in honor of the sovereign of Spain, Charles IV (1788-1819), of the Spanish branch of the House of Bourbon, and would memorialize the executed Bourbon king of France, Louis XVI.

== History ==
The village of Nouvelle Bourbon was established in 1793 by order of Baron Carondelet, Governor of the colony of Upper Louisiana "to put the new settlement under the special protection of the august sovereign who governs Spain, and also that the descendants of the new colonists may imitate the fidelity and firmness of their of their fathers toward their king." The sovereign who reigned over Spain, and thus Upper Louisiana, in 1793 was Charles IV, House of Bourbon.

The purpose of the settlement was to establish a number of French royalist families who had settled at Gallipolis in southeastern Ohio, but had become dissatisfied there. Pierre de Hault de Lassus de Luzière (grandfather of Ceran St. Vrain), belonging to a rich landed aristocracy in Hainault in Flanders, was appointed the first civil and military commandant when he arrived there in August, 1793. The village was originally known as the "Village des Petites Cotes" (French: village of little hills or slopes), because of the bluffs rolled back from the river rather than rising abruptly from it. Later the English form of Nouvelle Bourbon, New Bourbon, was used.

New Bourbon also became home to French nobility who had fled France following the French Revolution. Among the distinguished residents was Jean Rene Guiho, lord of Klegand, a native of Nantes, Brittany. He was invited by Chevalier de Luzière to take up his residence in the village, and was given a grant of 500 arpents on the Saline river.

The colony of Upper Louisiana on the west bank of the Mississippi River was divided into two districts: the Ste. Genevieve District and New Bourbon District, with each headed by its own commandant. The village of New Bourbon served as the seat of the New Bourbon District.

In 1793 François Vallé erected a mill on the creek now called Dodge’s Creek.

Today little remains of the community that once played such an important role in the French colony of Upper Louisiana.

== Layout ==
New Bourbon was a planned tripartite (three-part) French village, divided into three sections, with the village at the core of the settlement containing square lots called a terrain or an emplacement which typically contained a residence, a household garden, a small orchard and barnyard animals, a barn (grange) for grain, a cabin (cabane) or shed (appenti) for corn, and perhaps a slave cabin and a horse and cow milking stable. This lot would usually be closed off with a stone or wooden fence. At the core of the village was a Catholic church and an open public space place for assembly. The village would have been surrounded by a commons referred to as a parc or parque, common fields referred to as champs or terres cultivées, and the royal domains or domaine royale beyond these areas. The commons (parc) served as a multi-use piece of land, and would be used to provide herbage for cattle, wood for fuel and fencing, and berries and fruit. The common fields were divided into long, narrow strips champs en long (long lots) which were a few arpents wide and roughly 40 arpents long, and were used to raise wheat, corn and oats. After the harvest, these champs would be used to graze cattle and horses, with their manure acting as a means to fertilize the fields. The royal domains functioned as a commons for general use as the inhabitants deemed fit.

== Population ==
New Bourbon had a population of 270 in the year 1800, but the population began to shrink shortly afterwards, with 210 residents in 1804, roughly 100 inhabitants in 1807, and only around 40 being recorded in the years between 1815 and 1830.

== Geography ==
New Bourbon is located approximately 2.5 miles south of Ste. Genevieve on the bluffs overlooking the Le Grand Champ bottomlands along the Mississippi River, and is located within Ste. Genevieve Township.
