= Ste. Genevieve Catholic Church =

- Ste. Genevieve Catholic Church
- 37°58′45″N 90°02′50″W
- Location: Ste. Genevieve, Missouri
- Country: United States
- Denomination: Catholic

History
- Founded: 30 April 1876
- Consecrated: September 29, 1880

Architecture
- Architect: Francis Xavier Weiss

Ste. Genevieve Catholic Church is a Roman Catholic church located in Ste. Genevieve, Missouri, the first organized European settlement west of the Mississippi River in the United States of America .

== History ==
The cornerstone of this church was laid down on April 30, 1876. The cross was placed upon the steeple on November 1, 1879, with the building consecrated on September 29, 1880. Three-fourths of the cost of church was donated by Odile Pratte Valle, widow of Felix Valle, a grandson of Francois Valle I.

The Catholic faith first came to the Ste. Genevieve area when Jacques Marquette traveled down the Mississippi River in 1673. The parish of Ste. Genevieve was officially started in January 1759 by Jesuits who came from Quebec. Christian and Catholic history in the region goes back at least until the 1750s, although missionary priests from Kaskaskia, Illinois, and across the Mississippi River may have visited the area earlier. It is believed that a church was erected in the area around 1752 or 1754. The earliest marriage record dates back to 1759. The first regular pastor, Jean Baptiste de la Morinie, served from November 10, 1761, until October 15, 1763. The year 1763 was the year of the Jesuit expulsion from French America.

The site of the present church has been used as a church since the 1790s when old log church was possibly moved here to higher ground in 1794. An early stone church was erected on this site in 1835 and consecrated on November 12, 1837. The current church was built around the previous stone structure. The foundations of the previous log and stone churches are still visible in the basement of the present church. The present church was designed by Francis Xavier Weiss, a legendary pastor who served the parish of Ste. Genevieve from 1865 until 1900, and was built in a Gothic Revival style. In 1911, the church was enlarged with the rear wall removed and a hexagonal apse and two small transepts erected. The church is linked to a 1925 rectory of American Foursquare and Spanish Colonial style. Commandant Francois Valle II and a few of his family members and pastors are buried below the church nave.

As of 2013, the church serves about 1,100 families and has about two dozen relics. One relic belonged to Ste. Genevieve, the patron of Paris, and was placed around the neck of her statue inside the church. Between Christmas Eve 2012 and January 4, 2013, some saints' relics were stolen from the church. Afterwards, the relic of Ste. Genevieve was moved to a more secure location.
