= Valley View, Sainte Genevieve County, Missouri =

Valley View, Missouri
- Unincorporated community
- Location within Missouri
- Coordinates: 38°03′07″N 90°16′32″W
- Country: United States
- State: Missouri
- County: Sainte Genevieve
- Township: Jackson
- Elevation: 604 ft (184 m)
- Time zone: UTC-6 (Central (CST))
  - Summer (DST): UTC-5 (CDT)
- Area code: 573
- GNIS feature ID: 735996

Valley View is an unincorporated community in Jackson Township in Sainte Genevieve County, Missouri, United States. Valley View is located at the junction of Interstate 55 and Supplemental Route DD, 4.3 miles (6.9 km) northwest of Bloomsdale.
