= Henry Hollow =

Valley in Missouri, United States

Coordinates: 37.7806075°N 90.2581758°W

Henry Hollow is a valley in Ste. Genevieve County in the U.S. state of Missouri.

Henry Hollow bears the name of an early settler.
