= Haney Hill =

Hill in Missouri, U.S.

Coordinates: 37°46′07″N 90°09′06″W

Haney Hill is a summit in Ste. Genevieve County in the U.S. state of Missouri. It has an elevation of 778 feet (237 m).

Haney Hill has the name of Sam Haney, a pioneer settler.
