= Pickel, Missouri =

Unincorporated community in Missouri, U.S.

Coordinates: 37°47′47″N 90°17′12″W

Pickel is an unincorporated community in Ste. Genevieve County, in the U.S. state of Missouri.

== History ==
A variant spelling was "Pickle". A post office called Pickle was established in 1898, and remained in operation until 1905. The community was named after William Pickles, the original owner of the town site.
