= Zell, Missouri =

Unincorporated community in Missouri, U.S.

- unincorporated community
- Location of Ste. Genevieve County, Missouri
- Coordinates: 37°57′09″N 90°08′34″W
- Country: United States
- State: Missouri
- County: Sainte Genevieve
- Township: Ste. Genevieve
- Elevation: 623 ft (190 m)
- Time zone: UTC-6 (Central (CST))
  - Summer (DST): UTC-5 (CDT)
- ZIP code: 63670
- Area code: 573
- FIPS code: 29-81466

Zell is an unincorporated community located in Ste. Genevieve Township in Ste. Genevieve County, Missouri, United States. Zell is located approximately six miles west of Sainte Genevieve.

== Name ==
Zell is named for the town of Zell am Harmersbach in the Baden region of the German state of Baden-Württemberg, located about 10 miles southeast of Offenburg, from where its settlers had originally come.

== History ==
What is now Zell was first settled in 1798 when 1,000 arpents of land (1 arpent = 0.8507 acres (0.3443 ha)) were granted to Pierre Charles Dehault Delassus Deluziere, which he called the Prairie Gautier Tract. In 1819, following Delassus' death, this land was sold to his son Carlos de Hault de Lassus, and then shortly after to Charles’ nephew Felix de St. Vrain.

In 1837 German Catholics arrived, at which time the location was known as Nouvelle Alsace (French: New Alsace), and was subsequently renamed Zell in 1840. The Catholic church of St. Joseph was built between 1845 and 1847.

== Geography ==
Zell is located in Ste. Genevieve Township. The site is just northeast of Interstate 55, along Missouri Route A.

== Climate ==
The climate in this area is characterized by hot, humid summers and generally cold winters. According to the Köppen Climate Classification system, Zell has a humid subtropical climate, abbreviated "Cfa" on climate maps.

Climate data for Zell, MO
Month	Jan	Feb	Mar	Apr	May	Jun	Jul	Aug	Sep	Oct	Nov	Dec	Year
Mean daily maximum °F (°C)	40.0 (4.4)	45.0 (7.2)	56.0 (13.3)	68.0 (20.0)	77.5 (25.3)	86.0 (30.0)	90.0 (32.2)	89.0 (31.7)	81.0 (27.2)	70.0 (21.1)	56.0 (13.3)	44.0 (6.7)	66.9 (19.4)
Daily mean °F (°C)	30.0 (−1.1)	35.0 (1.7)	45.0 (7.2)	56.0 (13.3)	65.0 (18.3)	74.0 (23.3)	78.5 (25.8)	76.5 (24.7)	68.5 (20.3)	57.0 (13.9)	45.0 (7.2)	35.0 (1.7)	55.5 (13.0)
Mean daily minimum °F (°C)	20.0 (−6.7)	24.0 (−4.4)	33.0 (0.6)	43.0 (6.1)	54.0 (12.2)	63.0 (17.2)	67.0 (19.4)	64.0 (17.8)	56.0 (13.3)	44.0 (6.7)	34.0 (1.1)	25.0 (−3.9)	43.9 (6.6)
Average precipitation inches (mm)	2.3 (58)	2.3 (58)	3.6 (91)	4.0 (100)	4.8 (120)	3.8 (97)	3.9 (99)	3.4 (86)	3.2 (81)	3.1 (79)	3.7 (94)	3.5 (89)	41.6 (1,052)
Source: NOAA
