= Felix Vallé House State Historic Site =

Historic site in Missouri, United States

Felix Vallé State Historic Site
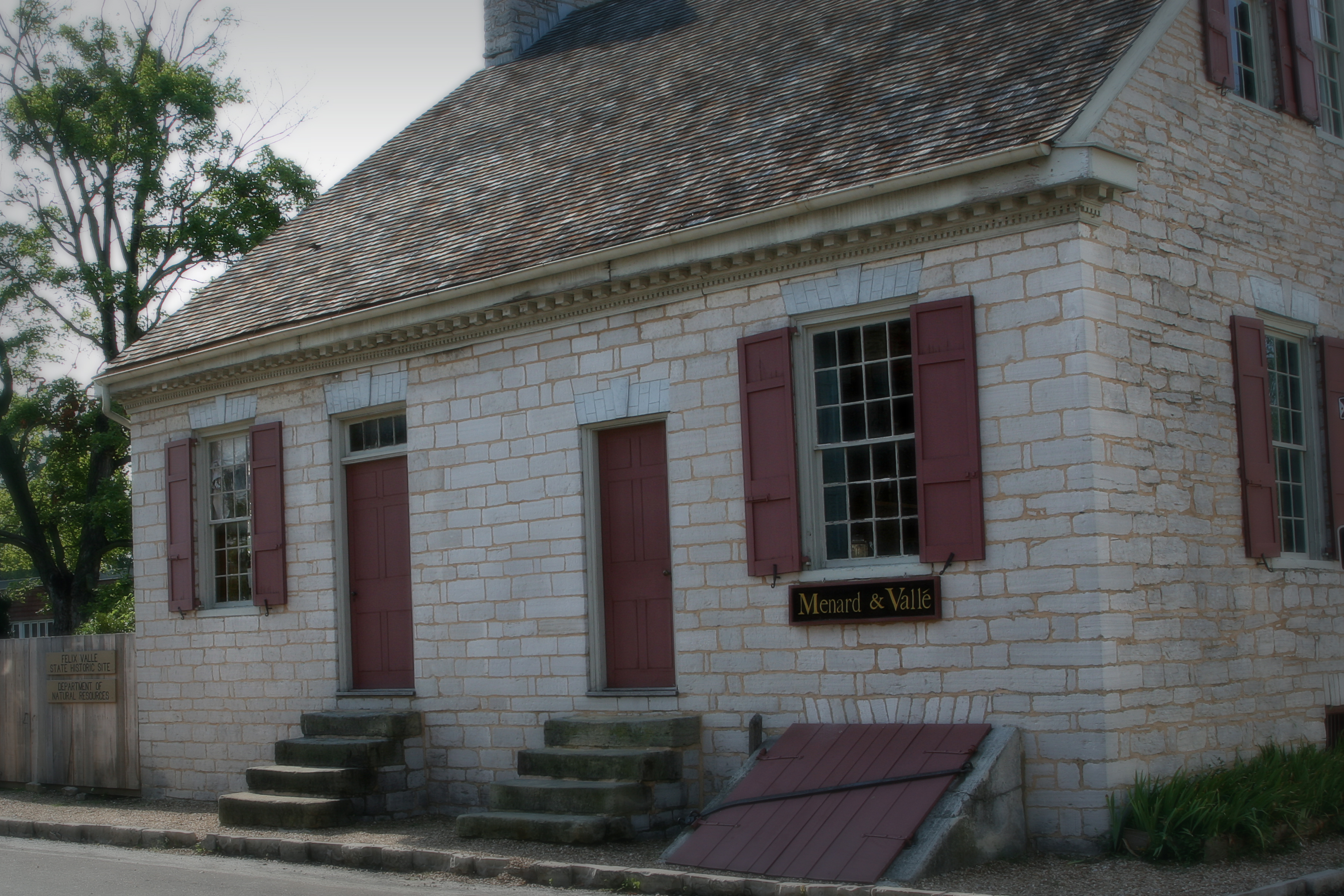
- Felix Vallé House

- Location within Missouri Location within the United States
- Location: Ste. Genevieve, Ste. Genevieve County, Missouri, United States
- Coordinates: 37°58′48″N 90°2′41″W
- Area: 11.73 acres (4.75 ha)
- Established: 1970
- Visitors: 7,619 (in 2022)
- Governing body: Missouri Department of Natural Resources
- Website: Felix Vallé House State Historic Site

The Felix Vallé House State Historic Site is a state-owned historic preserve comprising the Felix Vallé House and other early 19th-century buildings in Ste. Genevieve, Missouri. It is managed by the Missouri Department of Natural Resources.

== History ==
The Vallé family traced their history back to a French colonial officer. They also had a long connection with slavery, which was common at that time in history. Felix Vallé held two enslaved man, Isaac and Joseph (aged mid-30s and 22-24 respectively), and his nephew Neree Vallé held Theodore (aged 25). They worked in the lead mines owned by Felix Vallé and formed part of the 1852 Ste. Genevieve Stampede trying to escape to Illinois. They were recaptured after a reward offered by the Vallés.

In 1877, three people, Basil, Jabette and Madeline, were bequeathed $300 by Felix Vallé who wrote that they were "formerly slaves owned by me."

== Additional images ==
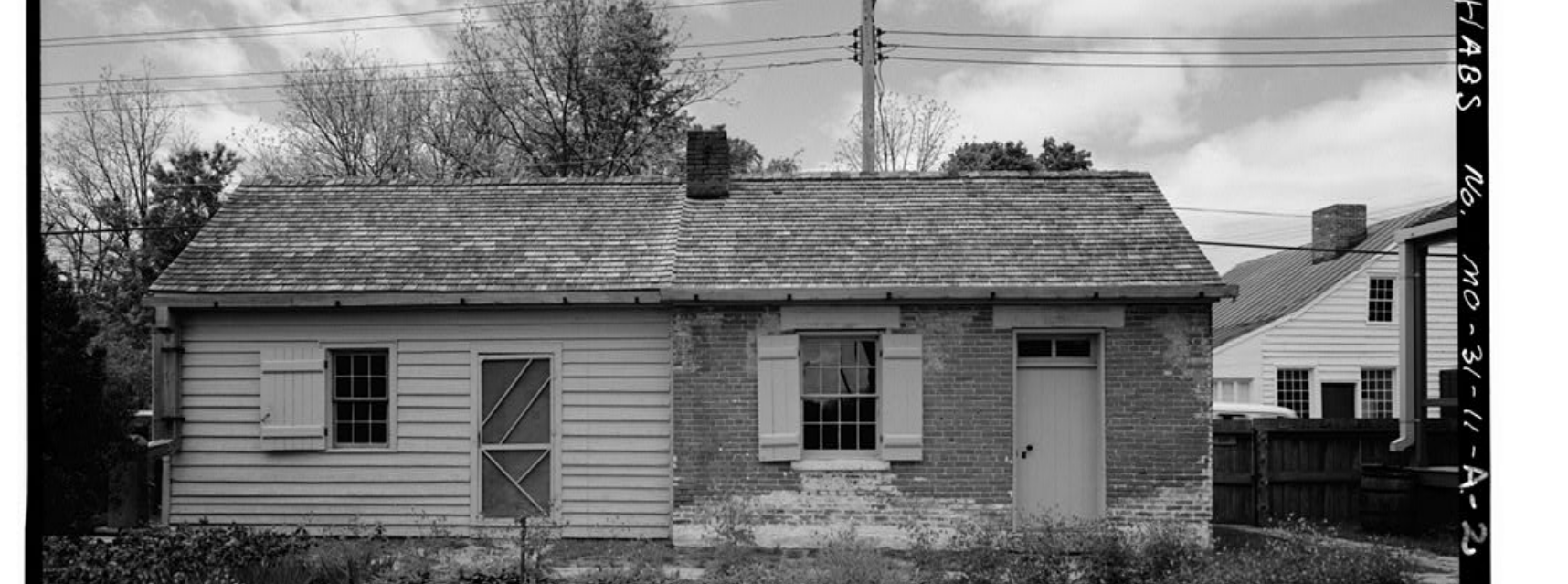
Slave quarters photographed 1986

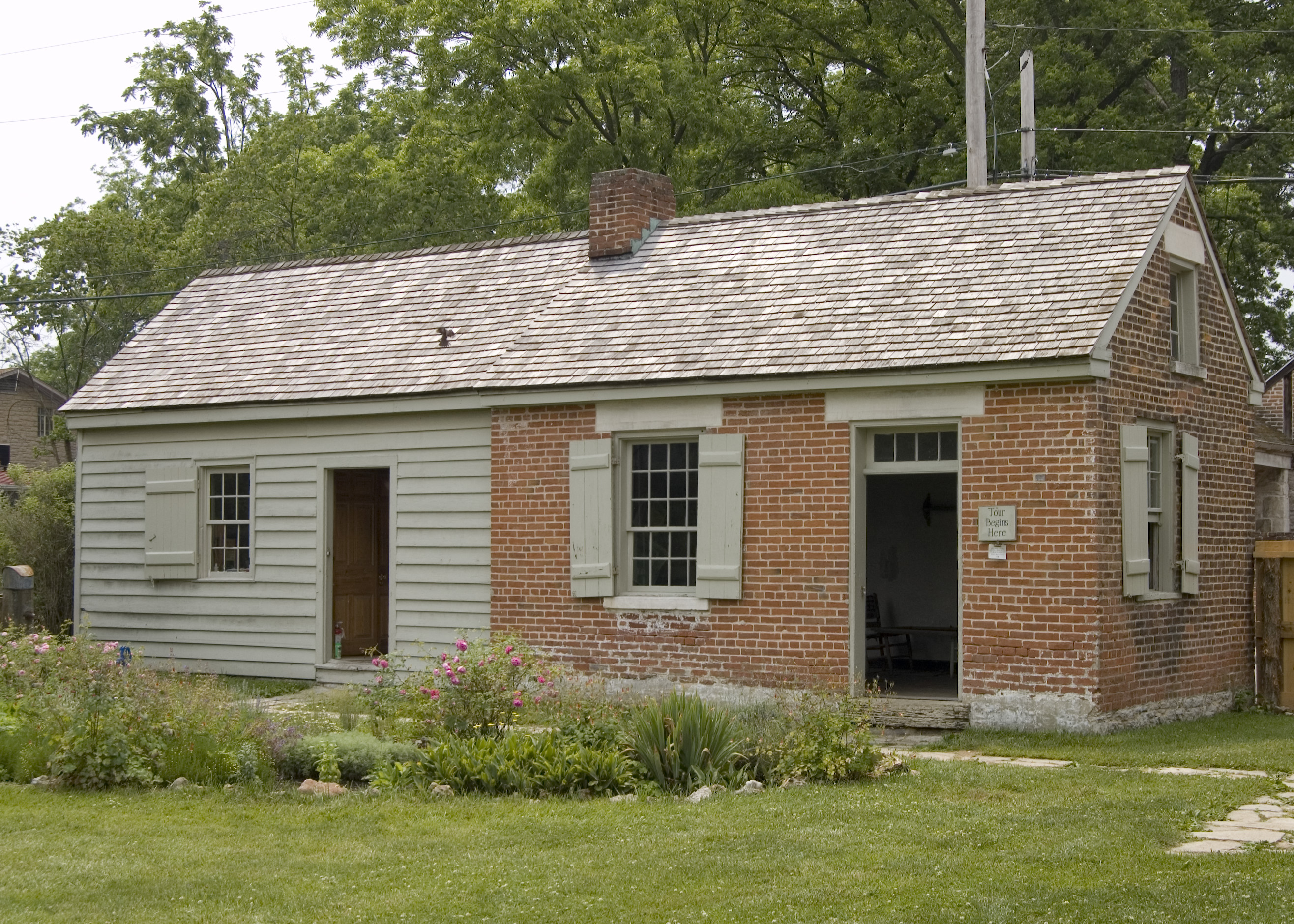
Slave quarters

== Modern day ==
The site offers tours of the Felix Vallé House, a Federal-style limestone structure built in 1818 by Jacob Phillipson, a Jewish merchant from Philadelphia, Pennsylvania, that in 1824 became the commercial outlet and home of Felix Vallé and Odile Pratte-Vallé. An authentically stocked mercantile store representing the firm of Menard & Vallé is on display. Other features of the house include original mantels and interior trim, early Empire furnishings, an exterior staircase leading to the second-floor bedrooms, and a garden with original brick and frame outbuildings.

The Bauvais-Amoureux House (1792), which is open seasonally, and the Dr. Benjamin Shaw House (1819) are also part of the historic site.
