= Mertell Hill =

Summit in the American state of Missouri

Coordinates: 37°51′48″N 90°07′49″W

Mertell Hill is a summit in Ste. Genevieve County in the U.S. state of Missouri. It has an elevation of 758 feet (231 m).

The hill rises between the River aux Vases to the north and Mill Creek to the south. The community of River aux Vases lies along Missouri Route B just northeast of the peak.

Mertell Hill has the name of the local Mertell family.
