= Morrison Hollow =

Valley in the American state of Missouri

Coordinates: 38.0903315°N 90.2192842°W

Morrison Hollow is a valley in Ste. Genevieve County in the U.S. state of Missouri.

Morrison Hollow has the name of the local Morrison family.
