= Corn Hollow =

Valley community in the American state of Missouri

Coordinates: 38.0161650°N 90.2467862°W

Corn Hollow is a valley in Ste. Genevieve County in the U.S. state of Missouri.

Corn Hollow was so named on account of the corn crop within the valley.
