= Wolf Hollow =

Valley in Missouri, USA

Coordinates: 38.098344°N 90.232252°W

Wolf Hollow is a valley in Ste. Genevieve County in the U.S. state of Missouri.

Wolf Hollow was so named on account of wolves in the area.
