= Kinsey, Missouri =

- unincorporated community
- Location of Ste. Genevieve County, Missouri
- Coordinates: 38°01′52″N 90°18′00″W
- Country: United States
- State: Missouri
- County: Sainte Genevieve
- Township: Jackson

Kinsey is an unincorporated community located in the central part of Jackson Township in Sainte Genevieve County, Missouri, United States. The town was named after William Metcalfe Kinsey, a congressman of St. Louis. Kinsey was born in Ohio, and came to Missouri in 1875, where he was elected congressman for the 10th district and became a leading Republican politician in the state.

A post office called Kinsey was established in 1889, and remained in operation until 1955.
