= Chestnut Ridge, Missouri =

Unincorporated community in Missouri, U.S.

Coordinates: 37°47′53″N 90°20′11″W

Chestnut Ridge is an unincorporated community in Ste. Genevieve County, in the U.S. state of Missouri.

== History ==
A post office called Chestnut Ridge was established in 1860, and remained in operation until 1877. The community was named for the chestnut timber at a nearby ridge.
