= Mill, Missouri =

Unincorporated community in Missouri, U.S.

Coordinates: 37°53′22″N 90°20′48″W

Mill is an unincorporated community in Ste. Genevieve County, in the U.S. state of Missouri.

== History ==
A post office called Mill was established in 1882, and remained in operation until 1906. The community was so named for a mill at the original town site.
