= Lick Hollow =

Valley in Missouri, United States

Coordinates: 37.9197754°N 90.2028961°W

Lick Hollow is a valley in Ste. Genevieve County in the U.S. state of Missouri.

Lick Hollow was so named on account of mineral licks in the valley.
