= Bidwell Hollow =

Valley in Missouri, United States

Coordinates: 37.7386639°N 90.1706733°W

Bidwell Hollow is a valley in Ste. Genevieve County the U.S. state of Missouri.

Bidwell Hollow has the name of the Bidwell family, proprietors of a local sawmill.
