= Snell Hollow =

Valley in the American state of Missouri

Coordinates: 38°04′39″N 90°11′51″W

Snell Hollow is a valley in Ste. Genevieve County in the U.S. state of Missouri.

Snell Hollow has the name of the Snell family of settlers.
