= Quarry Town, Missouri =

Unincorporated community in Missouri, U.S.

Coordinates: 37°55′47″N 90°00′09″W

Quarry Town (sometimes spelled Quarrytown) is an unincorporated community in Ste. Genevieve County, in the U.S. state of Missouri.

== History ==
A post office called Quarrytown was established in 1871, and remained in operation until 1873. The community was named for a quarry near the original town site.
