= Fourche a Du Clos =

Stream in Missouri, U.S.

Coordinates: 38°00′04″N 90°12′23″W

Fourche a Du Clos is a stream in Ste. Genevieve County in the U.S. state of Missouri. It is a tributary of Establishment Creek.

Fourche a Du Clos has the name of Du Clos, a pioneer citizen (Fourche means "fork" in French).

== See also ==
- List of rivers of Missouri
