= Marlo, Missouri =

Unincorporated community in Missouri, U.S.

Coordinates: 37°56′59″N 90°06′49″W

Marlo is an unincorporated community in Ste. Genevieve County, in the U.S. state of Missouri.

The community's name most likely is partially derived from marble, since there were deposits of marble near the original town site.

It was founded in 1925 by brothers Caeser and Angelo Marlo and was joined by Louis Pellegrini after the death of his father.
