= Grayhawk, Missouri =

- Unincorporated community
- Location within Missouri Location within the United States
- Coordinates: 37°55′52″N 90°14′20″W
- Country: United States
- State: Missouri
- County: Ste. Genevieve

Area
  - Total: 4.70 sq mi (12.18 km^{2})
  - Land: 4.35 sq mi (11.27 km^{2})
  - Water: 0.35 sq mi (0.90 km^{2})
- Elevation: 692 ft (211 m)

Population (2020)
  - Total: 488
  - Density: 112.1/sq mi (43.28/km^{2})
- Time zone: UTC-6 (Central (CST))
  - Summer (DST): UTC-5 (CDT)
- Area code: 573
- GNIS feature ID: 2587075

Grayhawk is an unincorporated community and census-designated place in Ste. Genevieve County, Missouri, United States. As of the 2020 census, Grayhawk had a population of 488.

== Geography ==
According to the U.S. Census Bureau, the community has an area of 4.701 square miles (12.18 km^{2}); 4.353 square miles (11.27 km^{2}) of its area is land, and 0.348 square miles (0.90 km^{2}) is water.

== Demographics ==
Historical population
Census	Pop.	Note	%±
2020	488		—
U.S. Decennial Census
