= Bloomsdale, Missouri =

City in Ste. Geneviere County, Missouri, United States

- City
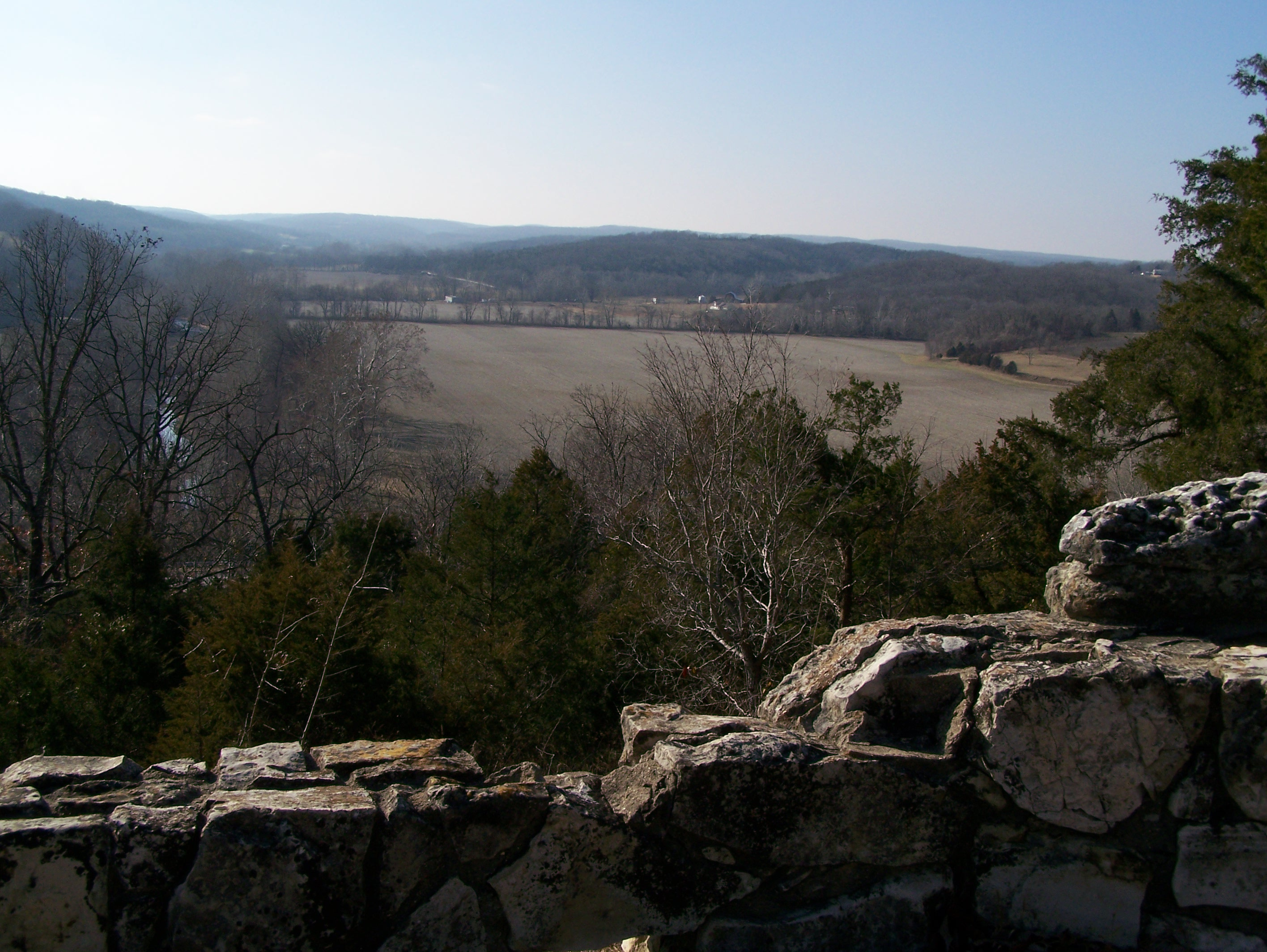
- View of Bloomsdale from roadside park on Highway 61

- Location of Bloomsdale, Missouri
- Coordinates: 38°00′53″N 90°13′17″W
- Country: United States
- State: Missouri
- County: Ste. Genevieve
- Township: Jackson Township, Sainte Genevieve County, Missouri
- Incorporated: 1963

Area
  - Total: 1.64 sq mi (4.24 km^{2})
  - Land: 1.63 sq mi (4.22 km^{2})
  - Water: 0.0077 sq mi (0.02 km^{2})
- Elevation: 518 ft (158 m)

Population (2020)
  - Total: 639
  - Density: 393/sq mi (151.6/km^{2})
- Time zone: UTC-6 (Central (CST))
  - Summer (DST): UTC-5 (CDT)
- FIPS code: 29-06454
- GNIS feature ID: 2394199
- Website: www.cityofbloomsdale.com

Bloomsdale is a city in Ste. Genevieve County, Missouri, United States. The population was 639 at the 2020 census.

== Etymology ==
The name of the town is most likely derived from the name of a Catholic priest, Father Blume.

== History ==
Bloomsdale was known as early as 1839 as "La Fourche à Duclos", meaning "the fork of Duclos" and named for the creek by the same name. Its parish priest, a Father Blume, wished his parishioners to all reside on one side of the stream, and so bought land for a settlement on what is now called Establishment Creek moved to the present site of Bloomsdale. One account has it that "Blumesdale" was mailed to Washington, D.C., as the name of the town's post office. But the name was illegible, so the story goes, so Washington called the office Bloomsdale. More likely, Washington anglicized the German name Blume ("flower") to Bloom. Either way, the name honors Father Blume.

== Geography ==
Bloomsdale is located in the eastern part of Jackson Township, near Establishment Creek.

According to the United States Census Bureau, the city has a total area of 1.64 square miles (4.25 km^{2}), of which 1.63 square miles (4.22 km^{2}) is land and 0.01 square miles (0.03 km^{2}) is water.

== Demographics ==
Historical population
Census	Pop.	Note	%±
1970	411		—
1980	397		−3.4%
1990	353		−11.1%
2000	419		18.7%
2010	521		24.3%
2020	639		22.6%
U.S. Decennial Census 2020

=== 2010 census ===
As of the census of 2010, there were 521 people, 202 households, and 136 families living in the city. The population density was 319.6 inhabitants per square mile (123.4/km^{2}). There were 216 housing units at an average density of 132.5 per square mile (51.2/km^{2}). The racial makeup of the city was 98.66% White, 0.58% Black or African American, 0.19% Native American, and 0.58% from two or more races.

There were 202 households, of which 36.6% had children under the age of 18 living with them, 56.4% were married couples living together, 6.9% had a female householder with no husband present, 4.0% had a male householder with no wife present, and 32.7% were non-families. 30.2% of all households were made up of individuals, and 11.4% had someone living alone who was 65 years of age or older. The average household size was 2.58 and the average family size was 3.25.

The median age in the city was 35.3 years. 30.7% of residents were under the age of 18; 5.4% were between the ages of 18 and 24; 26.4% were from 25 to 44; 21.1% were from 45 to 64; and 16.5% were 65 years of age or older. The gender makeup of the city was 48.9% male and 51.1% female.

=== 2000 census ===
As of the census of 2000, there were 419 people, 173 households, and 120 families living in the city. The population density was 259.9 inhabitants per square mile (100.3/km^{2}). There were 179 housing units at an average density of 111.1 per square mile (42.9/km^{2}). The racial makeup of the city was 98.81% White, 0.48% Native American, and 0.72% from two or more races. Hispanic or Latino of any race were 0.48% of the population.

There were 173 households, out of which 30.6% had children under the age of 18 living with them, 60.7% were married couples living together, 8.1% had a female householder with no husband present, and 30.1% were non-families. 27.2% of all households were made up of individuals, and 15.0% had someone living alone who was 65 years of age or older. The average household size was 2.42 and the average family size was 2.94.

In the city the population was spread out, with 24.8% under the age of 18, 8.5% from 18 to 24, 27.2% from 25 to 44, 22.7% from 45 to 64, and 16.9% who were 65 years of age or older. The median age was 36 years. For every 100 females there were 96.7 males. For every 100 females age 18 and over, there were 94.4 males.

The median income for a household in the city was $43,125, and the median income for a family was $61,429. Males had a median income of $39,688 versus $22,857 for females. The per capita income for the city was $17,714. About 3.8% of families and 6.1% of the population were below the poverty line, including none of those under age 18 and 16.7% of those age 65 or over.

== See also ==
- List of cities in Missouri
