= Jackson Township, Ste. Genevieve County, Missouri =

Jackson Township
- Civil Township
- Location of Ste. Genevieve County
- Coordinates: 38°01′46″N 90°16′40″W
- Country: United States
- State: Missouri
- County: Ste. Genevieve
- Established

Area
  - Total: 101 sq mi (260 km^{2})
  - Land: 97.4 sq mi (252 km^{2})
  - Water: 2.7 sq mi (7.0 km^{2})
- GNIS Feature ID: 767325

Jackson Township is a subdivision of Ste. Genevieve County, Missouri, in the United States of America, and is one of the five townships located in Ste. Genevieve County.

== Name ==
The township was named for the President Andrew Jackson who became president the year that the township was founded.

== History ==
Jackson Township was created in 1827 from the northern portion of Ste. Genevieve Township.

== Populated places ==
There are several communities in Jackson Township. The only incorporated community, Bloomsdale, has a population of 521.

- Bloomsdale
- Goose Creek Lake (part)
- Kinsey
- Needlemore
- Valley View

The township also contains three churches: Saint Lawrence's Catholic Church, and Lebanon Church, as well as the following cemeteries: Beckemeyer, Bequette, Bockenhamp, Concord, Hoover, and Moeller.

== Geography ==
Jackson Township is located in the northern portion of Ste. Genevieve County. A number of streams run through the township: Carpenter Branch, Coots Creek, Cunningham Branch, Fourche a du Clos, Goose Creek, Isle du Bois Creek, Kinsey Creek, and Pin Hook Branch. The following lakes are found in the township: Corbin Lake, Werners Sunset Lake, Sunset Lake, and Pinkston Lake.

== 2000 census ==
The 2000 census shows Jackson Township consisting of 3,337 individuals. The racial makeup of the town was 98.6% White, 0.0% African American, 0.2% Native American and Alaska Native, 0.0% Asian, and 0.08% from two or more races.

=== 2010 census ===
As of the census of 2010, there were 3,616 people, with a population density of 34 per square mile (68.6 km2), residing in the township. Males make up 1,686 (50.5%) of the population, while females make up 1,651 (49.5%). The median age for men is 35.7 years and for women is 35.4.

The racial makeup of the town was 98.3% White, 0.0% African American, 0.2% Native American and Alaska Native, 0.1% Asian, and 0.22% from other races, and 0.8% from two or more races.

The average household size 2.72 persons. The estimated median household income in 2009 was $45.556 ($38,209 in 1999). 11.0% of the residents have an income below the poverty rate.
