= Habitants =

Early French settlers of New France

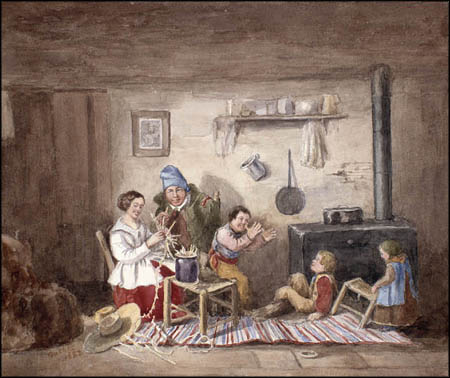
Habitants, by Cornelius Krieghoff (1852)

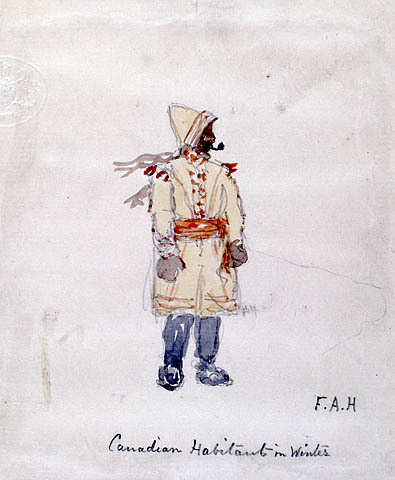
A habitant in winter dress, by Frances Anne Hopkins (1858)

Habitants (French: [abitɑ̃]) were French settlers and inhabitants of French origin who farmed the land along both shores of the St. Lawrence River and the Gulf of St. Lawrence in what is now Quebec, Canada. The term was used by the inhabitants themselves and the other classes of French Canadian society from the 17th century to the early 20th century, when the word declined in usage in favour of the more modern agriculteur (farmer) or producteur agricole (agricultural producer).

Habitants in New France were largely defined by the condition on the land that it could be forfeited unless it was cleared within a certain period of time. That condition kept the land from being sold by the seigneur and led instead to its being subgranted to peasant farmers, also called habitants. When habitants were granted the title deed to a lot, they had to agree to accept a variety of annual charges and restrictions. Rent was the most important of them and could be in money, produce, or labour. Once the rent was set, it could not be altered for inflation or time. Habitants essentially were free to develop their land as they wished, with only a few obligations to the seigneur.

Likewise, a seigneur did not have many responsibilities towards his habitants. The seigneur was obligated to build a gristmill for his tenants, who in turn were required to grind their grain there and to provide him with one sack of flour out of every 14. The seigneur was also allowed to a specific number of days of labour by habitants and to claim rights over fishing, timber, and common pastures.

Though the seigneurs' demands became more significant at the end of French rule, they could neither obtain enough resources from the rents and fees imposed on the habitants alone to become truly wealthy or to leave their tenants in poverty. Habitants were free individuals; seigneurs simply owned a "bundle of specific and limited rights over productive activity within that territory". The seigneur–habitant relationship was one in which both parties were owners of the land and divided the attributes of ownership between them.

== Economy and taxes ==
Most habitants grew crops that satisfied their own household needs for food and clothing and did not grow crops to sell on the market. Seigneurial farmers took the subsistence approach because of the smaller market that existed in Quebec. There had always been an exceedingly high number of farmers in New France and even in the early history of Quebec. It is estimated that in 1856, about 70% of Quebec's residents were farmers. In the Eastern United States, those numbers were drastically different. The earliest census data on the topic show that in 1870, only 13% of residents in Massachusetts and 25% of in New York State were farmers. At the time, the agricultural sector still accounted for over half of Quebec's working population. Those contrasting numbers show that the Quebec farmer served an internal market that was a third the size of the market available to the average New York State farmer. The smaller market in New France meant that habitants had little surplus wealth. Despite the lack of surplus income, habitants still had to pay a variety of annual dues for the land received from a seigneur.

There were certain responsibilities, or "duties", that came with receiving a free plot of land from the seigneur. Firstly, habitants were expected to cultivate and live on the land. If a piece of land was not cultivated within a year, the seigneur had the droit de réunion, or the right of repossession. Secondly, there were several dues that habitants had to pay to the seigneur. One due was the cens, which ranged between 2 and 6 sols. The charge was mostly symbolic since it was a fairly paltry sum. Rent was typically set at an annual rate of 20 sols for every arpent of land, and significant expenses would typically be paid each year by habitants to the seigneur towards fees for livestock grazing on the villages' common fields, wood harvesting, etc. Seigneurs also received lods et ventes if habitants sold their land that was equivalent to one twelfth of the sale price. Habitants also had the duty to grind wheat at the seigneurial mill and pay a fee of one fourteenth of the wheat that was ground. Some habitants also owed the seigneur one thirteenth of the total amount of fish that they caught. In addition, some habitants were responsible for completing one to four days of mandatory work during the sowing, harvesting, or haying seasons, which were called corvées. Habitants were expected to fulfill all of those obligations to repay the seigneur for granting them the land in the first place.

== Family life ==
Habitants went to New France to find a better life and so that they would have better farming opportunities. They moved to New France also so that they could have larger land holdings, which they eventually would pass on to their children.

For women, most of the adulthood was spent being a wife and raising children. Marriage was essential for women in New France and widowers often remarried. The significantly greater male population often allowed women their choice of partner and arranged marriages were infrequent. Some women were paid by the King of France to boost the population and were called the King's Daughters.

The Catholic Church played an important role in habitants' lives; it was the parish that recorded all the births, marriages, and deaths in the colony. Those important events were considered religious traditions and were marked by rituals. Nevertheless, parishes developed only in areas with a significant population. Habitants provided the local church and rectory, which were commonly used as meeting places and as community halls, and emergency food stores were often kept in the church's attic. Habitants also viewed Sunday Mass as not only a time for worship but also a time for communal gathering and socializing.

== See also ==
- Indentured servitude in British America
- Seigneurial system of New France
- Serfdom

== Sources ==
- "The Habitants: The Censitaires' Duties". Canadian Museum of Civilization.
- Coleman, Emma (1937). "A Seigneury of New France". The New England Quarterly. 10 (1): 133–138. doi:10.2307/360151. JSTOR 360151.
- Dechêne, Louise (1993). Habitants and Merchants in Seventeenth-Century Montreal. McGill-Queen's University Press. ISBN 0-7735-0658-6.
- Greer, Allan (1997). The People of New France. University of Toronto Press. ISBN 0-8020-0826-7.
- McCallum, John (1980). Unequal Beginnings: Agricultural and Economic Development in Quebec and Ontario Until 1870. University of Toronto Press.
