= Ste. Genevieve County, Missouri =

County in Missouri, United States

- County
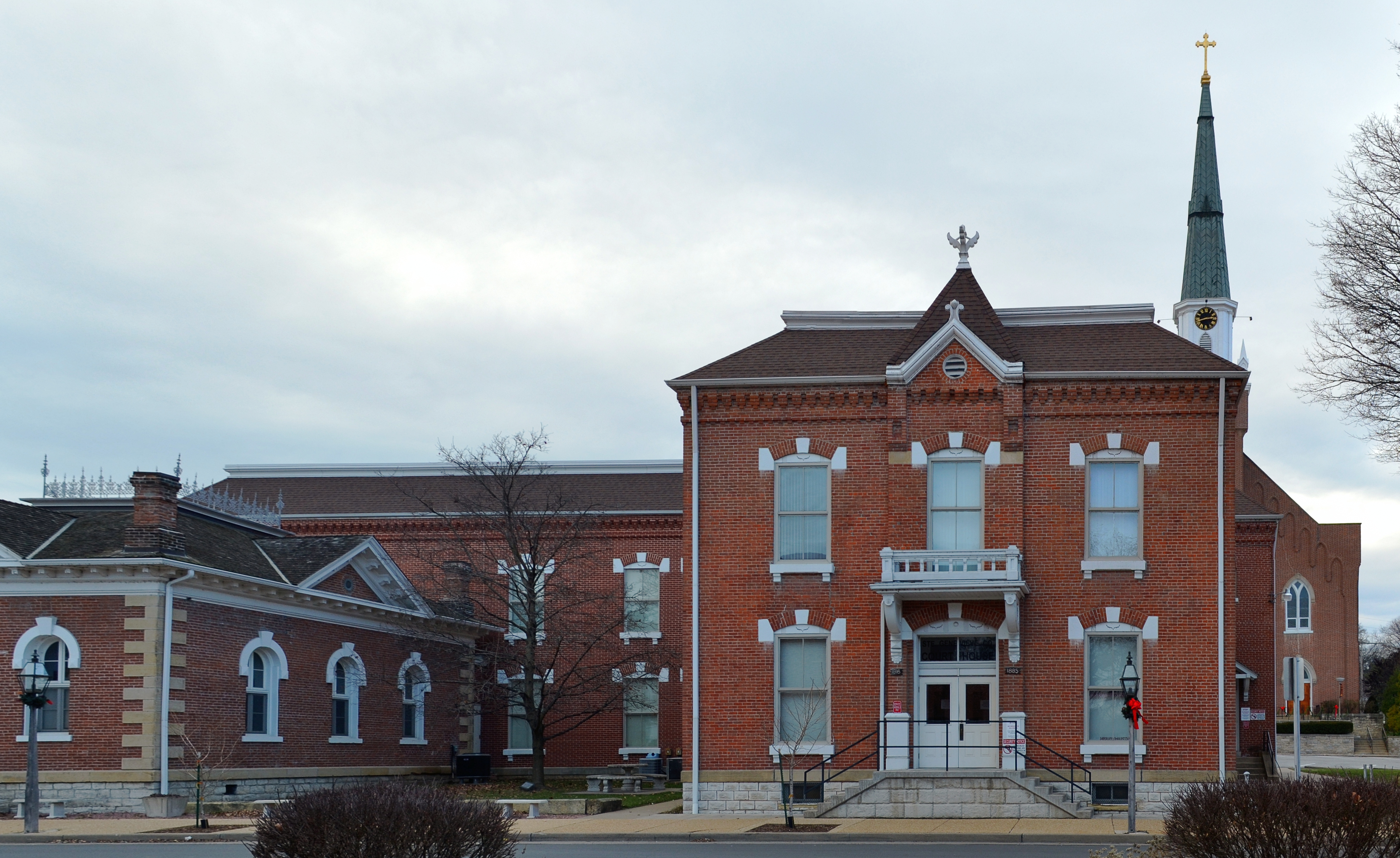
- Ste. Genevieve County Courthouse

- Location within the U.S. state of Missouri
- Coordinates: 37°53′36″N 90°12′12″W
- Country: United States
- State: Missouri
- Founded: October 1, 1812
- Named for: Saint Genevieve
- Seat: Ste. Genevieve
- Largest city: Ste. Genevieve

Area
  - Total: 507 sq mi (1,310 km^{2})
  - Land: 499 sq mi (1,290 km^{2})
  - Water: 7.6 sq mi (20 km^{2}) 1.5%

Population (2020)
  - Total: 18,479
  - Estimate (2025): 18,689 ▲
  - Density: 37.0/sq mi (14.3/km^{2})
- Time zone: UTC−6 (Central)
  - Summer (DST): UTC−5 (CDT)
- Congressional district: 8th
- Website: www.stegencounty.gov

Sainte Genevieve County, often abbreviated Ste. Genevieve County (French: comté de Ste-Geneviève), is a county located in the eastern portion of the U.S. state of Missouri. As of the 2020 census, the population was 18,479. The largest city and county seat is Ste. Genevieve. The county was officially organized on October 1, 1812, and is named after the Spanish district once located in the region, after Saint Genevieve, patroness of Paris, France.

It includes Ste. Genevieve, the earliest settlement west of the Mississippi River outside New Spain, and one of the French colonial mid-Mississippi valley villages. It is one of the last places where Paw Paw French is still spoken.

== History ==
Ste. Genevieve County is located on the west bank of the Mississippi River approximately 60 miles (97 km) south of St. Louis. Ste. Genevieve is the principal town and the county seat of Ste. Genevieve County with a population of around 5,000 people.

Ste. Genevieve was the first permanent civilized settlement in Missouri. The actual date of establishment is, like many other dates, connected to genealogy. Sources do not agree on the year of founding. According to Goodspeed's History of Southeast Missouri, and most of the descendants of the early settlers, 1735 is the most generally accepted date. Dr. Carl J. Ekberg, in his book, Colonial Ste. Genevieve, suggests that Ste. Genevieve was founded closer to 1750, based on interpretations of early letters, maps, and Catholic Church documents. Ste. Genevieve is about 250 years old.

The village of Ste. Genevieve was originally included in what was known as the Illinois Country. This was generally accepted to be all the land claimed by the French from the mouth of the Ohio River, north to the Great Lakes, and including the valleys of the Mississippi, Missouri, and Ohio rivers. The French established their seat of government for this territory in New Orleans. What is now Missouri became part of Upper Louisiana Territory. Early French explorers and settlers were known to have been in the Ste. Genevieve area in the very early 18th century.

Salt was a very important commodity at the time, used in the preservation of foods and curing of animal hides. The early French settlers were quick to exploit the salt springs on Saline Creek just south of Ste. Genevieve. Mineral explorations attracted Renault and La Motte to the area. Some of the earliest lead mines were named for La Motte in nearby Madison County.

Probably the biggest factor in the establishment of Ste. Genevieve was agriculture. Across the Mississippi River in Fort de Chartres and Kaskaskia, there was a growing need for agricultural land for the colonists. Across the Mississippi from Fort Kaskaskia was a large fertile section of river bottom, called the "Grand Champ" or Big Field. The "Old Town" of Ste. Genevieve was originally located here. It was approximately three miles south of the present site of Ste. Genevieve.

The village of Ste. Genevieve was originally an offshoot of the older French communities on the east bank of the Mississippi River—Cahokia, Kaskaskia, village of Chartres, Prairie du Rocher, and St. Philippe. The rich agricultural lands of the river bottoms were main attractions that lured most all of the early French pioneers to Ste. Genevieve. All the civil and legal business of Ste. Genevieve was transacted at Kaskaskia until about 1766 when the first commandant, Philippe de Rocheblave, was installed at Ste. Genevieve. By that time, more French migrants moved to the village from east of the river to escape British rule after France's defeat in the Seven Years' War.

Townspeople relocated Ste. Genevieve to its present higher location from the river bottoms after the devastating floods of 1785. According to a sworn statement by Julien Labriere, in October 1825, "there were about fifty or sixty cabins in the old village. The old village was overflowed so as to be on the tops of houses. The water in many places was twelve or fifteen feet deep." The Mississippi River was the main travel route in the early decades, when it served as a means of transportation for travelers both across, and up and down the river. The first commercial ferry between Ste. Genevieve and the Illinois side was established about 1800.

When Missouri was first being settled, the Osage Native Americans were the only tribe between the Osage River and the Mississippi. They were of the same stock as the Sioux and were hostile to the whites. Around 1787, the Spanish government, which had acquired the territory from France in 1762, brought in a band of Shawnee and Delaware Native Americans, who had been friendly to the French, to help protect the settlers from the Osage.

After the French had established and settled Ste. Genevieve, the first English-speaking American settlers started showing up in about 1788, and trickled upriver from Cape Girardeau and New Madrid. Starting about 1794, after the American Revolutionary War, newly independent Americans began migrating into the Ste. Genevieve District from Pennsylvania, Virginia, Kentucky, and Tennessee.

The flow increased in the early nineteenth century. In 1800, France reacquired Louisiana from Spain, and in 1803, Napoleon Bonaparte I sold it to the United States as the Louisiana Purchase. U.S. officials took over in 1804. They formed Ste. Genevieve County in 1812 as an original county of the Louisiana Territory, from the old Ste. Genevieve District. It is bordered on the east by the Mississippi River, on the north by Jefferson County, on the west by St. Francois County, and on the south by Perry County.

Starting around 1840, German Catholics began settling around New Offenburg and Zell. Shortly afterward German Lutherans began spreading into Ste. Genevieve from Perry County. But as late as 1930, most residents of Ste Genevieve were Catholic.

== Geography ==
According to the U.S. Census Bureau, the county has a total area of 507 square miles (1,310 km^{2}), of which 499 square miles (1,290 km^{2}) is land and 7.6 square miles (20 km^{2}) (1.5%) is water. The county's northeastern border with Illinois is formed by the Mississippi River.

=== Adjacent counties ===
- Jefferson County (northwest)
- Monroe County, Illinois (northeast)
- Randolph County, Illinois (east)
- Perry County (southeast)
- St. Francois County (southwest)

=== Major highways ===
- Interstate 55
- U.S. Route 61
- Route 32
- Route 144

=== National protected area ===
- Mark Twain National Forest (part)

=== Mountains and hills ===
- Haney Hill
- Mertell Hill
- Pikes Peak
- St. Francois Mountains

=== Valleys ===
- Bidwell Hollow
- Corn Hollow
- Henry Hollow
- Lick Hollow
- Morrison Hollow
- Snell Hollow
- Staples Hollow
- Wolf Hollow

== Demographics ==
Historical population
Census	Pop.	Note	%±
1820	4,962		—
1830	2,186		−55.9%
1840	3,148		44.0%
1850	5,313		68.8%
1860	8,029		51.1%
1870	8,384		4.4%
1880	10,390		23.9%
1890	9,883		−4.9%
1900	10,359		4.8%
1910	10,607		2.4%
1920	9,809		−7.5%
1930	10,097		2.9%
1940	10,905		8.0%
1950	11,237		3.0%
1960	12,116		7.8%
1970	12,867		6.2%
1980	15,180		18.0%
1990	16,037		5.6%
2000	17,842		11.3%
2010	18,145		1.7%
2020	18,479		1.8%
2025 (est.)	18,689	▲	1.1%
U.S. Decennial Census; 1790-1960 1900-1990; 1990-2000 2010-2015 2020

=== 2020 census ===
As of the 2020 census, the county had a population of 18,479. The median age was 43.8 years. 21.5% of residents were under the age of 18 and 20.1% of residents were 65 years of age or older. For every 100 females there were 107.9 males, and for every 100 females age 18 and over there were 107.2 males age 18 and over.

The racial makeup of the county was 93.5% White, 1.7% Black or African American, 0.3% American Indian and Alaska Native, 0.2% Asian, 0.0% Native Hawaiian and Pacific Islander, 0.3% from some other race, and 4.0% from two or more races, with Hispanic or Latino residents of any race comprising 1.5% of the population. The table below lists the counts and percentages for each race and Hispanic or Latino origin category from the same dataset.

27.0% of residents lived in urban areas, while 73.0% lived in rural areas.

There were 7,104 households in the county, of which 28.2% had children under the age of 18 living with them and 18.6% had a female householder with no spouse or partner present. About 25.2% of all households were made up of individuals and 12.2% had someone living alone who was 65 years of age or older.

There were 8,301 housing units, of which 14.4% were vacant. Among occupied housing units, 80.9% were owner-occupied and 19.1% were renter-occupied. The homeowner vacancy rate was 1.4% and the rental vacancy rate was 6.9%.

=== Racial and ethnic composition ===
Ste. Genevieve County, Missouri – Racial and ethnic composition Note: the US Census treats Hispanic/Latino as an ethnic category. This table excludes Latinos from the racial categories and assigns them to a separate category. Hispanics/Latinos may be of any race.
Race / Ethnicity (NH = Non-Hispanic)	Pop 1980	Pop 1990	Pop 2000	Pop 2010	Pop 2020	% 1980	% 1990	% 2000	% 2010	% 2020
White alone (NH)	15,023	15,888	17,404	17,607	17,127	98.97%	99.07%	97.55%	97.03%	92.68%
Black or African American alone (NH)	47	45	124	117	320	0.31%	0.28%	0.69%	0.64%	1.73%
Native American or Alaska Native alone (NH)	20	30	45	52	54	0.13%	0.19%	0.25%	0.29%	0.29%
Asian alone (NH)	17	24	29	49	29	0.11%	0.15%	0.16%	0.27%	0.16%
Native Hawaiian or Pacific Islander alone (NH)	x	x	0	1	2	x	x	0.00%	0.01%	0.01%
Other race alone (NH)	3	1	1	2	19	0.02%	0.01%	0.01%	0.01%	0.10%
Mixed race or Multiracial (NH)	x	x	107	168	659	x	x	0.60%	0.93%	3.57%
Hispanic or Latino (any race)	70	49	132	149	269	0.46%	0.31%	0.74%	0.82%	1.46%
Total	15,180	16,037	17,842	18,145	18,479	100.00%	100.00%	100.00%	100.00%	100.00%

=== 2000 census ===
As of the 2000 census, there were 17,842 people, 6,586 households, and 4,926 families residing in the county. The population density was 36 people per square mile (14 people/km^{2}). There were 8,018 housing units at an average density of 16 units per square mile (6.2/km^{2}). The racial makeup of the county was 98.03% White, 0.72% Black or African American, 0.30% Native American, 0.16% Asian, 0.13% from other races, and 0.66% from two or more races. Approximately 0.74% of the population were Hispanic or Latino of any race.

There were 6,586 households, out of which 35.10% had children under the age of 18 living with them, 63.60% were married couples living together, 7.60% had a female householder with no husband present, and 25.20% were non-families. 21.80% of all households were made up of individuals, and 10.40% had someone living alone who was 65 years of age or older. The average household size was 2.66 and the average family size was 3.09.

In the county, the population was spread out, with 26.60% under the age of 18, 7.60% from 18 to 24, 27.90% from 25 to 44, 23.30% from 45 to 64, and 14.50% who were 65 years of age or older. The median age was 38 years. For every 100 females there were 101.20 males. For every 100 females age 18 and over, there were 100.50 males.

The median income for a household in the county was $48,764, and the median income for a family was $56,170. Males had a median income of $33,609 versus $18,875 for females. The per capita income for the county was $20,876. About 6.00% of families and 8.20% of the population were below the poverty line, including 11.30% of those under age 18 and 7.90% of those age 65 or over.

== Education ==
Of adults 25 years of age and older in Ste. Genevieve County, 73.8% possess a high school diploma or higher while 8.1% holds a bachelor's degree or higher as their highest educational attainment.

=== Public schools ===
- Ste. Genevieve County R-II School District - Ste. Genevieve
  - Bloomsdale Elementary School - Bloomsdale - (K-05)
  - Ste. Genevieve Elementary School (K-05)
  - Ste. Genevieve Middle School (06-08)
  - Ste. Genevieve High School (09-12)

=== Private schools ===
- Sacred Heart School - St. Mary - (K-05) - Roman Catholic
- St. Agnes Catholic Elementary School - Bloomsdale - (PK-08) - Roman Catholic
- St. Joseph Elementary School - Ste. Genevieve - (PK-05) - Roman Catholic
- Valle Catholic Schools - Ste. Genevieve - (K-12) - Roman Catholic
  - Valle Catholic Grade School (K-08)
  - Valle Catholic High School (09-12)

=== Public libraries ===
- Sainte Genevieve County Library

== Politics ==
=== Local ===
Historically, Democrats controlled local politics in Ste. Genevieve County. However, in recent years this has changed. In 2018, Claudia Stuppy became the first Republican elected in over 20 years to a countywide position, and longtime sheriff Gary Stolzer switched parties from Democratic to Republican.

Ste. Genevieve County, Missouri

Elected countywide officials
Assessor	Linda Wagner	Democratic
Circuit Clerk	Julie Bova	Democratic
County Clerk	Sue Wolk	Democratic
Collector	Kim Resinger Gielow	Republican
Commissioner (presiding)	Randy Ruzicka	Republican
Commissioner (district 1)	Karen A. Stuppy	Democratic
Commissioner (district 2)	Randy Ruzicka	Republican
Coroner	Eric Basler	Democratic
Prosecuting Attorney	Wayne Williams	Democratic
Public Administrator	Amanda Kuehn	Republican
Recorder	Mary Jane Fallert White	Republican
Sheriff	Gary Stolzer	Republican
Surveyor	Gerald "Duck" Bader	Democratic
Treasurer	Sara Hoog	Democratic

Past Gubernatorial Elections Results
Year	Republican	Democratic	Third Parties
2024	72.43% 6,887	25.54% 2,428	2.03% 193
2020	65.94% 6,180	32.12% 3,011	1.94% 182
2016	50.31% 4,242	47.07% 3,969	2.62% 221
2012	36.15% 2,878	61.35% 4,884	2.50% 199
2008	32.87% 2,861	65.48% 5,699	1.65% 144
2004	46.90% 3,845	51.32% 4,208	1.78% 146
2000	48.36% 3,525	48.76% 3,554	2.88% 210
1996	37.31% 2,515	60.23% 4,060	2.46% 166
1992	33.97% 2,372	66.03% 4,610	0.00% 0
1988	55.65% 3,437	43.57% 2,691	0.78% 48
1984	51.53% 3,070	48.47% 2,888	0.00% 0
1980	40.19% 2,490	59.60% 3,692	0.21% 13
1976	42.21% 2,260	57.70% 3,089	0.09% 5

=== State ===
Ste. Genevieve County is divided into two legislative districts in the Missouri House of Representatives.

- District 115 is currently represented by Elaine Gannon (R-De Soto). Consists of the extreme northern part of the county along the Jefferson County line.

Missouri House of Representatives — District 115 — Ste. Genevieve County (2020)
Party	Candidate	Votes	%	±%
Republican	Cyndi Buchheit-Courtway	773	66.52%	
Democratic	Cynthia Nugent	387	33.30%	

Missouri House of Representatives — District 115 — Ste. Genevieve County (2018)
Party	Candidate	Votes	%	±%
Republican	Elaine Gannon	716	97.95%	

Missouri House of Representatives — District 115 — Ste. Genevieve County (2016)
Party	Candidate	Votes	%	±%
Republican	Elaine Gannon	656	62.71%	+2.54
Democratic	Barbara Stocker	333	31.84%	−2.70
Libertarian	Charles Bigelow	57	5.45%	+5.45

Missouri House of Representatives — District 115 — Ste. Genevieve County (2014)
Party	Candidate	Votes	%	±%
Republican	Elaine Gannon	284	60.17%	+14.02
Democratic	Dan Darian	163	34.54%	−19.31
Constitution	Jerry Dollar Jr.	25	5.30%	+5.30

Missouri House of Representatives — District 115 — Ste. Genevieve County (2012)
Party	Candidate	Votes	%	±%
Republican	Elaine Gannon	474	46.15%	
Democratic	Rich McCane	553	53.85%	

- District 116 is currently represented by Dale Wright (politician) (R-Farmington). Consists of most of the entire county.

Missouri House of Representatives — District 116 — Ste. Genevieve County (2020)
Party	Candidate	Votes	%	±%
Republican	Dale Wright	6460	98.49%	

Missouri House of Representatives — District 116 — Ste. Genevieve County (2018)
Party	Candidate	Votes	%	±%
Republican	Dale Wright	3,396	53.65%	
Democratic	Bill Kraemer	2,923	46.18%	

Missouri House of Representatives — District 116 — Ste. Genevieve County (2016)
Party	Candidate	Votes	%	±%
Republican	Kevin Engler	5,918	98.08%	

All of Ste. Genevieve County is a part of Missouri's 3rd District in the Missouri Senate and is currently represented by Elaine Freeman Gannon (R-De Soto, Missouri). The 3rd Senatorial District consists of Iron, Reynolds, St. Francois, Ste. Genevieve and Washington counties and part of Jefferson County.

Missouri Senate — District 3 — Ste. Genevieve County (2020)
Party	Candidate	Votes	%	±%
Republican	Elaine Gannon	7,342	98.31%	

Missouri Senate — District 3 — Ste. Genevieve County (2016)
Party	Candidate	Votes	%	±%
Republican	Gary Romine	6,328	83.02%	
Green	Edward R. Weissler	1,273	16.70%	

Missouri Senate — District 3 — Ste. Genevieve County (2012)
Party	Candidate	Votes	%	±%
Republican	Gary Romine	3,061	38.43%	
Democratic	Joseph Fallert Jr.	4,905	61.57%	

=== Federal ===
U.S. Senate — Missouri — Ste. Genevieve County (2018)
Party	Candidate	Votes	%	±%
Republican	Josh Hawley	3,902	51.90%	
Democratic	Claire McCaskill	3,347	44.52%	
Libertarian	Japheth Campbell	94	1.25%	
Green	Jo Crain	42	0.56%	
Independent	Craig O'Dear	131	1.74%	

U.S. Senate — Missouri — Ste. Genevieve County (2016)
Party	Candidate	Votes	%	±%
Republican	Roy Blunt	4,096	48.83%	+14.45
Democratic	Jason Kander	3,929	46.83%	−12.97
Libertarian	Jonathan Dine	203	2.42%	−3.40
Green	Johnathan McFarland	99	1.18%	+1.18
Constitution	Fred Ryman	62	0.74%	+0.74

U.S. Senate — Missouri — Ste. Genevieve County (2012)
Party	Candidate	Votes	%	±%
Republican	Todd Akin	2,735	34.38%	
Democratic	Claire McCaskill	4,758	59.80%	
Libertarian	Jonathan Dine	463	5.82%	

Ste. Genevieve County is included in Missouri's 8th Congressional District and is currently represented by Jason T. Smith (R-Salem) in the U.S. House of Representatives. Smith won a special election on Tuesday, June 4, 2013, to finish out the remaining term of U.S. Representative Jo Ann Emerson (R-Cape Girardeau). Emerson announced her resignation a month after being reelected with over 70 percent of the vote in the district. She resigned to become CEO of the National Rural Electric Cooperative.

U.S. House of Representatives — District 8 — Ste. Genevieve County (2020)
Party	Candidate	Votes	%	±%
Republican	Jason T. Smith	6,170	68.13%	
Democratic	Kathy Ellis	2,704	29.86%	
Libertarian	Tom Schmitz	178	1.97%	

U.S. House of Representatives — District 8 — Ste. Genevieve County (2018)
Party	Candidate	Votes	%	±%
Republican	Jason T. Smith	4,251	58.61%	
Democratic	Kathy Ellis	2,879	39.69%	
Libertarian	Jonathan Shell	123	1.70%	

U.S. House of Representatives — District 8 — Ste. Genevieve County (2016)
Party	Candidate	Votes	%	±%
Republican	Jason T. Smith	4,978	62.36%	+10.42
Democratic	Dave Cowell	2,790	34.95%	−3.32
Libertarian	Jonathan Shell	215	2.69%	+0.12

U.S. House of Representatives — District 8 — Ste. Genevieve County (2014)
Party	Candidate	Votes	%	±%
Republican	Jason T. Smith	1,983	51.94%	−2.43
Democratic	Barbara Stocker	1,461	38.27%	−4.08
Libertarian	Rick Vandeven	98	2.57%	+1.44
Constitution	Doug Enyart	137	3.59%	+1.99
Independent	Terry Hampton	139	3.64%	+3.64

U.S. House of Representatives — District 8 — Special Election — Ste. Genevieve County (2013)
Party	Candidate	Votes	%	±%
Republican	Jason T. Smith	579	54.37%	−6.60
Democratic	Steve Hodges	451	42.35%	+6.62
Libertarian	Bill Slantz	12	1.13%	−2.17
Constitution	Doug Enyart	17	1.60%	+1.60
Write-In	Wayne L. Byington	6	0.56%	+0.56

U.S. House of Representatives — District 8 — Ste. Genevieve County (2012)
Party	Candidate	Votes	%	±%
Republican	Jo Ann Emerson	4,711	60.97%	
Democratic	Jack Rushin	2,761	35.73%	
Libertarian	Rick Vandeven	255	3.30%	

==== Political culture ====
United States presidential election results for Ste. Genevieve County, Missouri
Year	Republican		Democratic		Third party(ies)	
Year	No.	%	No.	%	No.	%
1888	776	38.90%	1,167	58.50%	52	2.61%
1892	683	36.00%	1,155	60.89%	59	3.11%
1896	903	41.94%	1,245	57.83%	5	0.23%
1900	935	41.63%	1,296	57.70%	15	0.67%
1904	986	45.50%	1,163	53.67%	18	0.83%
1908	1,064	48.78%	1,108	50.80%	9	0.41%
1912	1,100	47.58%	1,138	49.22%	74	3.20%
1916	1,137	47.93%	1,218	51.35%	17	0.72%
1920	1,917	62.08%	1,149	37.21%	22	0.71%
1924	1,330	49.20%	1,257	46.50%	116	4.29%
1928	1,099	30.09%	2,547	69.74%	6	0.16%
1932	1,109	26.31%	3,087	73.24%	19	0.45%
1936	1,664	39.79%	2,446	58.49%	72	1.72%
1940	2,750	56.63%	2,098	43.20%	8	0.16%
1944	2,214	54.03%	1,878	45.83%	6	0.15%
1948	1,567	43.92%	1,984	55.61%	17	0.48%
1952	2,682	52.91%	2,385	47.05%	2	0.04%
1956	2,633	52.70%	2,363	47.30%	0	0.00%
1960	1,956	37.86%	3,211	62.14%	0	0.00%
1964	1,316	25.89%	3,768	74.11%	0	0.00%
1968	1,937	42.09%	2,225	48.35%	440	9.56%
1972	2,900	56.34%	2,247	43.66%	0	0.00%
1976	2,241	41.72%	3,091	57.54%	40	0.74%
1980	2,768	44.00%	3,324	52.84%	199	3.16%
1984	3,245	54.37%	2,723	45.63%	0	0.00%
1988	2,532	41.08%	3,612	58.60%	20	0.32%
1992	1,780	24.94%	3,795	53.17%	1,562	21.89%
1996	2,078	30.89%	3,597	53.47%	1,052	15.64%
2000	3,505	47.94%	3,600	49.24%	206	2.82%
2004	3,791	46.54%	4,281	52.55%	74	0.91%
2008	3,732	42.29%	4,979	56.42%	114	1.29%
2012	4,055	50.25%	3,813	47.25%	202	2.50%
2016	5,496	64.57%	2,542	29.86%	474	5.57%
2020	6,630	69.91%	2,713	28.61%	141	1.49%
2024	7,031	71.92%	2,629	26.89%	116	1.19%

Ste. Genevieve was once a reliably Democratic stronghold in presidential elections. From 1948 to 2008, the county voted Democratic at every election except the national Republican landslides of 1952, 1956, 1972 and 1984. George W. Bush lost Ste. Genevieve County both times in 2000 and 2004; in the latter election, it was one of only four county-level jurisdictions (the independent city of St. Louis, St. Louis County and Jackson County) that voted for John Kerry. Unlike other rural counties throughout Missouri, Ste. Genevieve County was one of only nine counties in Missouri that favored Barack Obama over John McCain in 2008. The Democratic dominant streak in Ste. Genevieve County, however, was broken in 2012 when Mitt Romney carried it by three points over incumbent President Obama. This was the first time that a Republican presidential nominee had won Ste. Genevieve County since Ronald Reagan carried the county in his landslide reelection bid in 1984. This rightward tend continued in the 2016 presidential election, in which Republican Donald Trump won the county with 64%, the highest percentage of any presidential candidate since Lyndon Johnson in 1964. This rightward trend on the national level continued in the following two presidential elections.

Like most rural counties throughout Missouri, voters in Ste. Genevieve County generally adhere to socially and culturally conservative principles but are more moderate or populist on economic issues. Its character is similar to those of Yellow Dog Democratic counties in the South. In 2004, Missourians voted on a constitutional amendment to define marriage as the union between a man and a woman—it overwhelmingly passed Ste. Genevieve County with 75.25 percent of the vote. The initiative passed the state with 71 percent of support from voters as Missouri became the first state to ban same-sex marriage. In 2006, Missourians voted on a constitutional amendment to fund and legalize embryonic stem cell research in the state—it failed in Ste. Genevieve County with 56.22 percent voting against the measure. The initiative narrowly passed the state with 51 percent of support from voters as Missouri became one of the first states in the nation to approve embryonic stem cell research. Despite Ste. Genevieve County's longstanding tradition of supporting socially conservative platforms, voters in the county have a penchant for advancing populist causes like increasing the minimum wage. In 2006, Missourians voted on a proposition (Proposition B) to increase the minimum wage in the state to $6.50 an hour—it passed Ste. Genevieve County with 79.26 percent of the vote. The proposition strongly passed every single county in Missouri with 78.99 percent voting in favor as the minimum wage was increased to $6.50 an hour in the state. During the same election, voters in five other states also strongly approved increases in the minimum wage.

=== Missouri presidential preference primary (2008) ===
Then U.S. Senator Hillary Clinton (D-New York) received more votes, a total of 1,922, than any candidate from either party in Ste. Genevieve County during the 2008 presidential primary. She also received more votes than the total number of votes cast in the entire Republican Primary in Ste. Genevieve County.

== Communities ==
=== Cities ===
- Bloomsdale
- St. Mary
- Ste. Genevieve (county seat)

=== Census-designated places ===
- Goose Creek Lake
- Grayhawk
- Ozora
- Weingarten

=== Unincorporated communities ===
- Avon
- Brickeys
- Chestnut Ridge
- Clearwater
- Clement
- Coffman
- Kinsey
- Lawrenceton
- Marlo
- Mill
- Millers
- Minnith
- Mosher
- Needmore
- New Offenburg
- Pickel
- Quarry Town
- River aux Vases
- Rocky Ridge
- Sprott
- Thomure
- Valley View
- Womack
- Zell

=== Ghost towns ===
- La Saline
- New Bourbon

=== Townships ===
- Beauvais
- Jackson
- Ste. Genevieve
- Saline
- Union

== See also ==
- Al Agnew
- National Register of Historic Places listings in Ste. Genevieve County, Missouri
