= Ste. Genevieve National Historical Park =

Historic district in Missouri, United States

- Ste. Genevieve Historic District
- U.S. National Register of Historic Places
- U.S. National Historic Landmark District
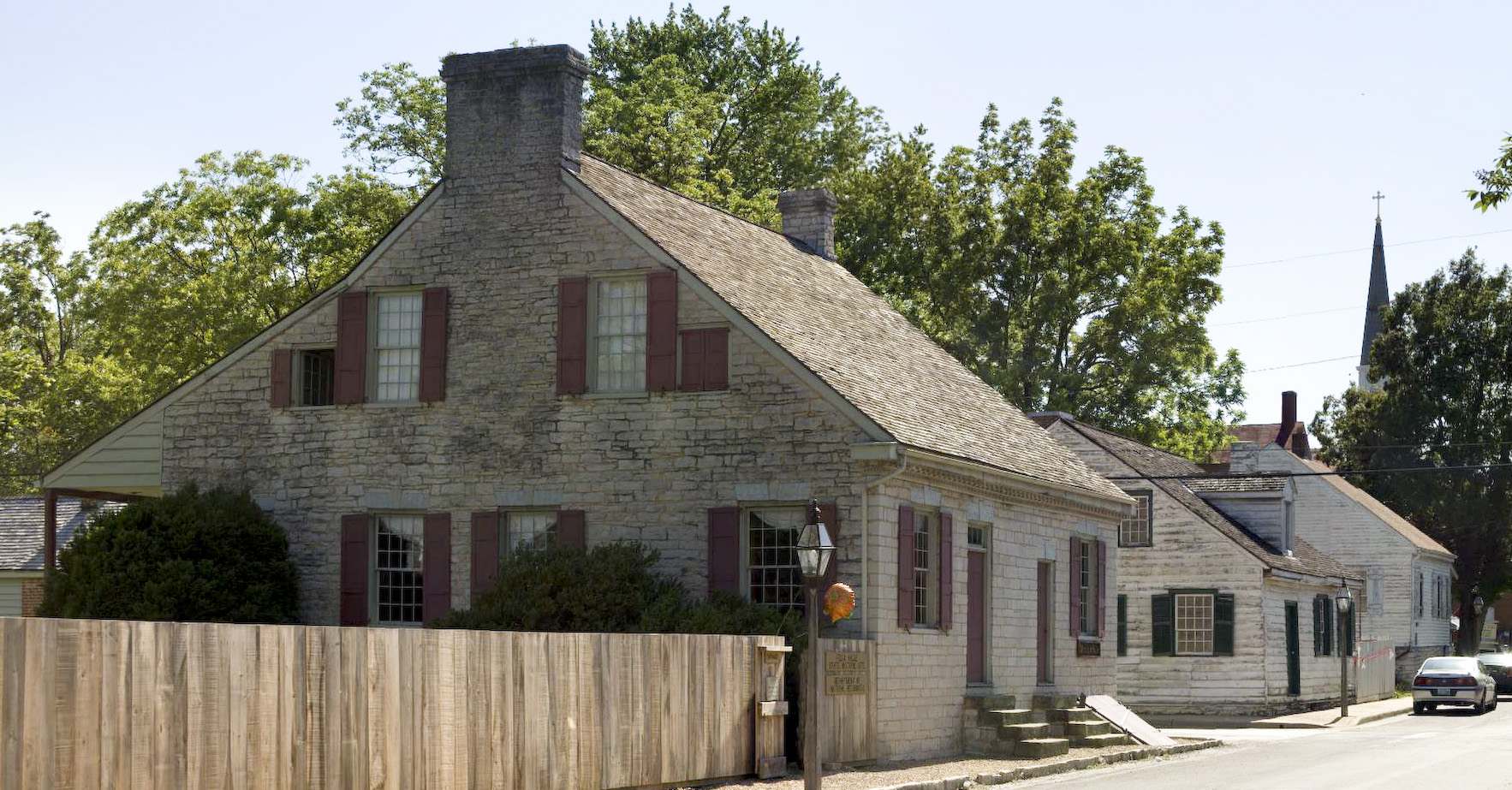
- Felix Vallé State Historic Site, within the historic district

- Location within Missouri Location within the United States
- Location: Ste. Genevieve, Missouri
- Coordinates: 37.97696°N 90.048672°W
- Built: 1750
- Architectural style: Colonial
- Visitation: 16,525 (2025)
- NRHP reference No.: 66000892 and 02000357

Significant dates
- Added to NRHP: October 15, 1966, boundary increase April 11, 2002
- Designated NHLD: October 9, 1960

The Ste. Genevieve National Historical Park, established in 2020, consists of part or the whole of the area of the Ste. Genevieve Historic District, which is a historic district encompassing much of the built environment of Ste. Genevieve, Missouri, United States. The city was in the late 18th century the capital of Spanish Louisiana, and, at its original location a few miles south, capital of French Louisiana as well. A large area of the city, including fields along the Mississippi River, is a National Historic Landmark District designated in 1960, for its historically French architecture and land-use patterns, while a smaller area, encompassing the parts of the city historically important between about 1790 and 1950, was named separately to the National Register of Historic Places in 2002.

Ste. Genevieve is home to one of the highest concentrations of distinctive types of French colonial architecture known as poteaux en terre, or post in ground, and Poteaux-sur-sol, or post on sill. Both of these styles involve construction of walls consisting of vertical logs, the former placed directly into the ground, and the latter onto a horizontal sill of wood or stone. Prominent local examples of these architectural styles include the Beauvais-Amoureux House, the Felix Vallé House State Historic Site, La Maison de Guibourd, the Delassus-Kern House, and the Louis Bolduc House (itself listed separately as a National Historic Landmark). In 2018, the National Park Service was authorized to establish Ste. Genevieve National Historical Park as a unit of the U.S. national park system, following a favourable study by the park service. It joined the park system on October 30, 2020.

== History ==
Ste. Genevieve was established in the 1750s by French colonists, when the territory west of the Mississippi River was part of French Louisiana. It became the principle civic center of the region, and continued to be so when the area passed into Spanish control with the Treaty of Paris in 1763. The original site of Ste. Genevieve, about 3 miles (4.8 km) south of the present city, was severely damaged by major flooding in 1785. After this event, the city was, over the next ten years, relocated to its present site on higher ground. The oldest surviving buildings in the city date to this period, with the church moved from its old site in 1793. The agricultural area just outside the city to the southeast is largely still laid out as it was at that time, following traditional French colonial lines.

Americans began to arrive in Ste. Genevieve after the Louisiana Purchase in 1810, and were followed by immigrant groups as the 19th century progressed. By the mid-19th century German-Americans made up the single largest population group in the city. Late in the 19th century, the manufacture of lime became a major local industry, and in 1904 the city became the western end of a railroad ferry, connecting to Kellogg, Illinois.

== Historic preservation and district designations ==
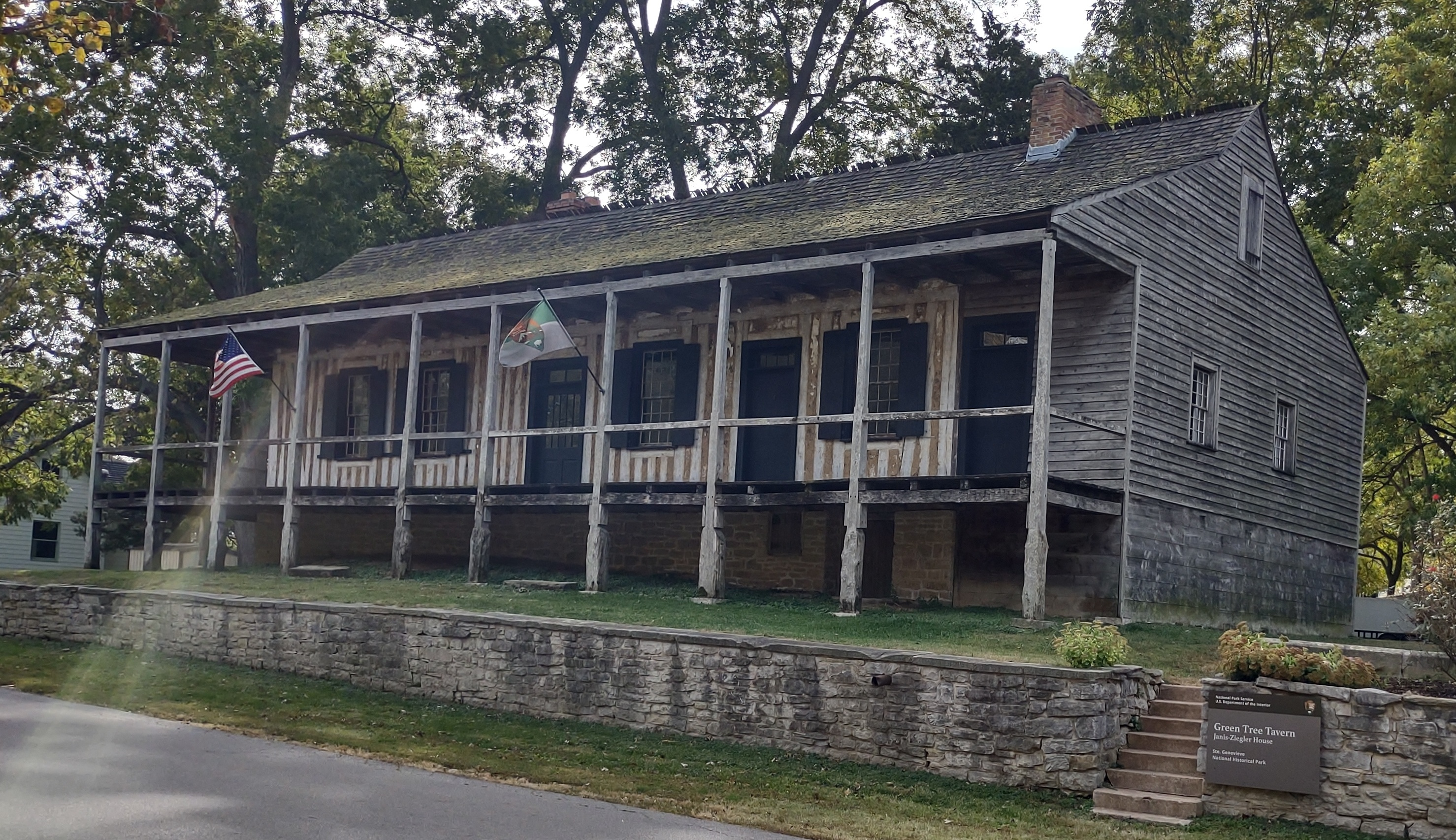
The Green Tree Tavern, one of the buildings operated by the National Park Service

The importance of Ste. Genevieve's early architecture has long been recognized. In the 1930s a number of its builds were documented by the Historic American Buildings Survey (HABS), and the Bolduc House was restored in 1956–57. The National Park Service conducted a historic site survey of the region in 1960, leading to the designation of one of the first National Historic Landmark Districts. A survey by the Park Service in 1980 identified the location of Ste. Genevieve's early settlement on the Mississippi floodplain, which had long been thought to be lost to floodwaters. The state has stepped in to acquire several of the older buildings for preservation and interpretation as historic sites.

The landmark designation as made in 1960 was short on details and exact boundaries. In 1970, the designation was amended to set a boundary, encompassing about 1,200 acres (490 ha), including much of the town and river bottomlands that reflected French colonial land-use methods. Repeated attempts to further update the landmark designation, including an explicit enumeration of contributing and non-contributing properties, have been made (in 1975, 1986, and 2001), but none of these have passed review. As part of the 2001 work, a separate National Register nomination was prepared, approved in 2002 by the Park Service, that focused on the area's broader historical patterns. Its boundaries exclude the outlying agricultural areas. The park service has been developing plans for a potential national historical park based on Ste. Genevieve's history and architecture.

On March 23, 2018, the National Park Service was authorized to establish Ste. Genevieve National Historical Park, when President Donald Trump signed a $1.3 trillion omnibus appropriations bill which contained a single line about the park in its 2,232 pages.

On October 30, 2020, U.S. Secretary of the Interior David L. Bernhardt took the last step necessary to formally establish Ste. Genevieve National Historical Park as the 422nd unit of the National Park System.

In 2020, a new visitors center was announced.

== Selected bibliography ==
=== Related sources ===
==== Pre-Louisiana Purchase ====
- Alvord, Clarence W. and Sutton, Robert M., The Illinois Country, 1673–1818, ISBN 0-252-01337-9
- Belting, Natalia Maree, Kaskaskia under the French Regime by ISBN 0-8093-2536-5
- Brackenridge, Henri Marie, Recollections of Persons and Places in the West (Google Books)
- Ekberg, Carl J., Colonial Ste. Genevieve: An Adventure on the Mississippi Frontier, Tucson, AZ: Patrice Press, 1996
- Ekberg, Carl J., Francois Vallé and His World: Upper Louisiana Before Lewis and Clark, Columbia, MO: University of Missouri Press, 2002.
- Ekberg, Carl J., Stealing Indian Women: Native Slavery in the Illinois Country, Urbana, IL: University of Illinois Press, 2007.
- Ekberg, Carl J., Francois Valle and His World: Upper Louisiana before Lewis & Clark, Tucson, AZ: Patrice Press, 2006
- Ekberg, Carl J., French Roots in the Illinois Country: The Mississippi Frontier in Colonial Times, Tucson, AZ: Patrice Press, ISBN 0-252-06924-2

==== Post Louisiana Purchase ====
- Aron, Stephen, American Confluence: The Missouri Frontier from Borderland to Border State
- Peterson, Charles E., Colonial St. Louis: Building a Creole Capitol, Tucson, AZ: Patrice Press, 2001.
- Schroeder, Walter A., Opening the Ozarks: A Historical Geography of Missouri's Ste. Genevieve District, 1760–1830, Columbia, MO: University of Missouri Press, 2002.
- Stepenoff, Bonnie, From French Community to Missouri Town, Columbia, MO: University of Missouri Press, 2006.
- Missouri Life Magazine, Lewis And Clark's Journey Across Missouri, Booneville, MO: Missouri Life Magazine, 2003.

==== Overall history of Ste. Genevieve, Missouri ====
- Franzwa, Gregory M., The Story of Old Ste. Genevieve, Tucson: Patrice Press, 1998.
- Deposki, Richard, Images of America: Ste. Genevieve, Chicago, IL: Arcadia Publishing, 2008.
- Evans, Mark L., The Commandant's Last Ride, Tucson, AZ: Patrice Press, 1998.
- Foster, Gerald, American Houses: A Field Guide to the Architecture of the Home, New York: Houghton Mifflin Co. 2004.
- Naeger, Bill, Patti Naeger, and Mark Evans, Ste. Genevieve: A Leisurely Stroll through History. Ste. Genevieve, MO: Merchant Street Publishing, 1998.
- Wehmeyer, Janice C., Ste. Genevieve, MO: A Guided Tour Through the Past and Present, self-published: 1993

== See also ==
- National Register of Historic Places listings in Ste. Genevieve County, Missouri
