= National Register of Historic Places listings in Ste. Genevieve County, Missouri =

Location of Ste. Genevieve County in Missouri

This is a list of the National Register of Historic Places listings in Ste. Genevieve County, Missouri.

This is intended to be a complete list of the properties and districts on the National Register of Historic Places in Ste. Genevieve County, Missouri, United States. Latitude and longitude coordinates are provided for many National Register properties and districts; these locations may be seen together in a map.

There are 6 properties and districts listed on the National Register in the county, including 2 National Historic Landmarks.

This National Park Service list is complete through NPS recent listings posted March 14, 2025.

== Current listings ==
	Name on the Register	Image	Date listed	Location	City or town	Description
1	Louis Bolduc House	Louis Bolduc House	April 16, 1969 (#69000305)	123 S. Main St. 37°59′21″N 90°03′13″W	Ste. Genevieve	
2	Common Field Archeological Site	Common Field Archeological Site	July 29, 1969 (#69000306)	Northern side of Cotton Woods Rd., east of its junction with U.S. Route 61; 37°57′22″N 90°00′50″W	Ste. Genevieve	
3	Jacques Dubreuil Guibourd House	Jacques Dubreuil Guibourd House	May 21, 1969 (#69000307)	Northwestern corner of 4th and Merchant Sts. 37°58′46″N 90°02′52″W	Ste. Genevieve	
4	Kreilich Archeological Site	Kreilich Archeological Site	May 21, 1969 (#69000308)	Along U.S. Route 61 at the junction of Saline Creek and the old Mississippi River bed 37°54′03″N 89°58′34″W	Ste. Genevieve	
5	Ste. Genevieve Historic District	Ste. Genevieve Historic District	October 15, 1966 (#66000892)	Most of central Ste. Genevieve and riverfront farmlands 37°58′47″N 90°01′55″W	Ste. Genevieve	Landmark district listed for its 18th-century French buildings and landscape.
6	Ste. Genevieve Historic District	Ste. Genevieve Historic District	April 1, 2002 (#02000357)	Toughly bounded by Main St. and St. Mary's Rd., Roberts, 7th, and Seraphin Sts. 37°58′44″N 90°02′35″W	Ste. Genevieve	Historic district encompassing most of the built center of the city, listed for 19th and 20th-century architectural history.

== See also ==
- List of National Historic Landmarks in Missouri
- National Register of Historic Places listings in Missouri
