= Bousillage =

Infill material used in timbered buildings

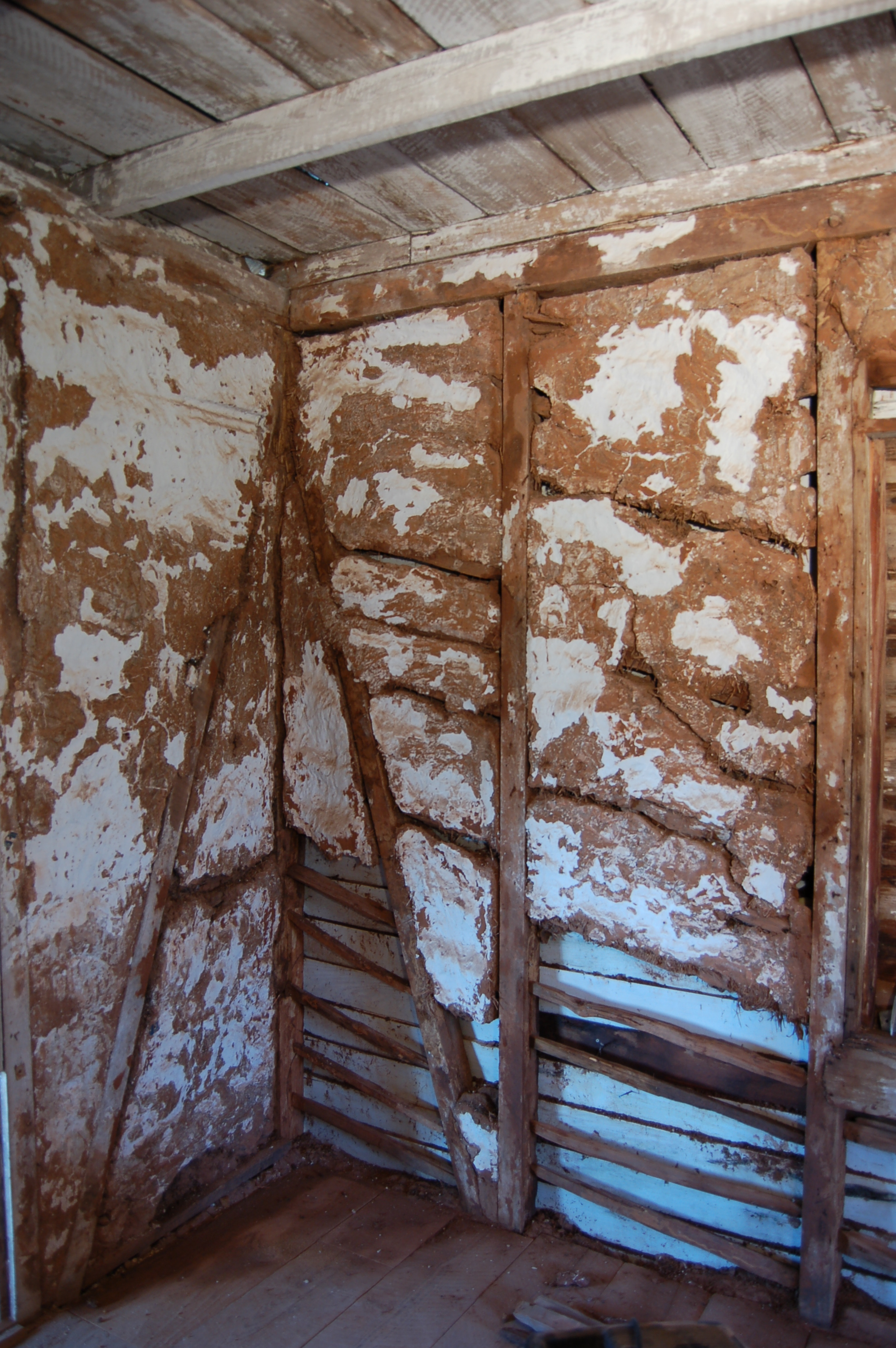
Bousillage infill between the studs

Bousillage (bouzillage, bousille, bouzille) is a mixture of clay and grass or other fibrous substances used as the infill (chinking) between the timbers of a half-timbered building. This material was commonly used by 18th-century French colonial settlers in the historical New France region of the United States and is similar to the material cob and adobe. In French torchis has the same meaning or the meaning of a loaf of this material.

== Discussion ==
Bousillage in south Louisiana is a mixture of clay earth and retted Spanish moss, but in the Upper Mississippi River Valley and Canada contains straw, grass or hair, used to fill in the panels in poteaux-sur-sol, poteaux-en-terre, and half-timbered framing (called colombage in French). This was a technique used in French Louisiana by colonists from the 18th to 19th centuries. In France the framing was typically in-filled between the post with brick (briquette-entre-poteaux), stone and mud (pierrotage) or bousillage. There was no stone in south Louisiana, and bricks were not being made during early colonial times. The colonist picked up on a technique that the Native Americans were using to build their wattle and daub structures, and that was heavy clay soil and retted Spanish moss as the binder. Split sticks or staves, known as barreaux, rabbits or batons were used as rungs between the upright post. They were shaped to fit at an angle and hammered into place without the use of nails.

Bousillage is made by layering a taché (hole in the ground) with mud and moss and adding water. Then tacherons (barefoot men) worked the mixture into a mortar. Torchis (bousillage shaped like a bread dough loaf) are hung over the barreaux being compacted, one placed next to another. The finished wall would have been either lime washed or covered with lime plaster. The plaster contains animal hair as a binder.

== Gallery of structures using bousillage ==
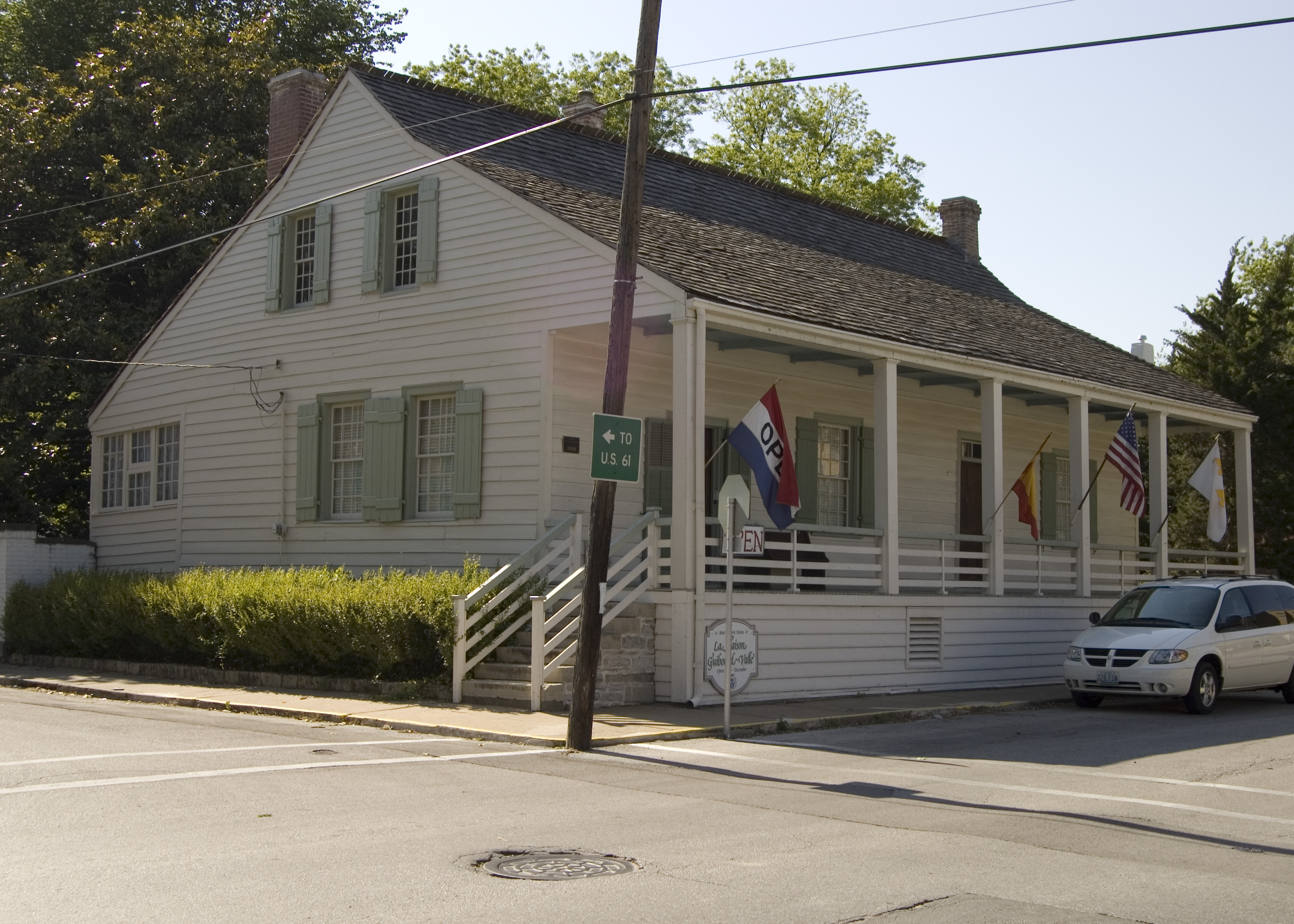
La Maison de Guibourd Historic House in Ste. Genevieve, Missouri is an example of poteaux-sur-solle construction.

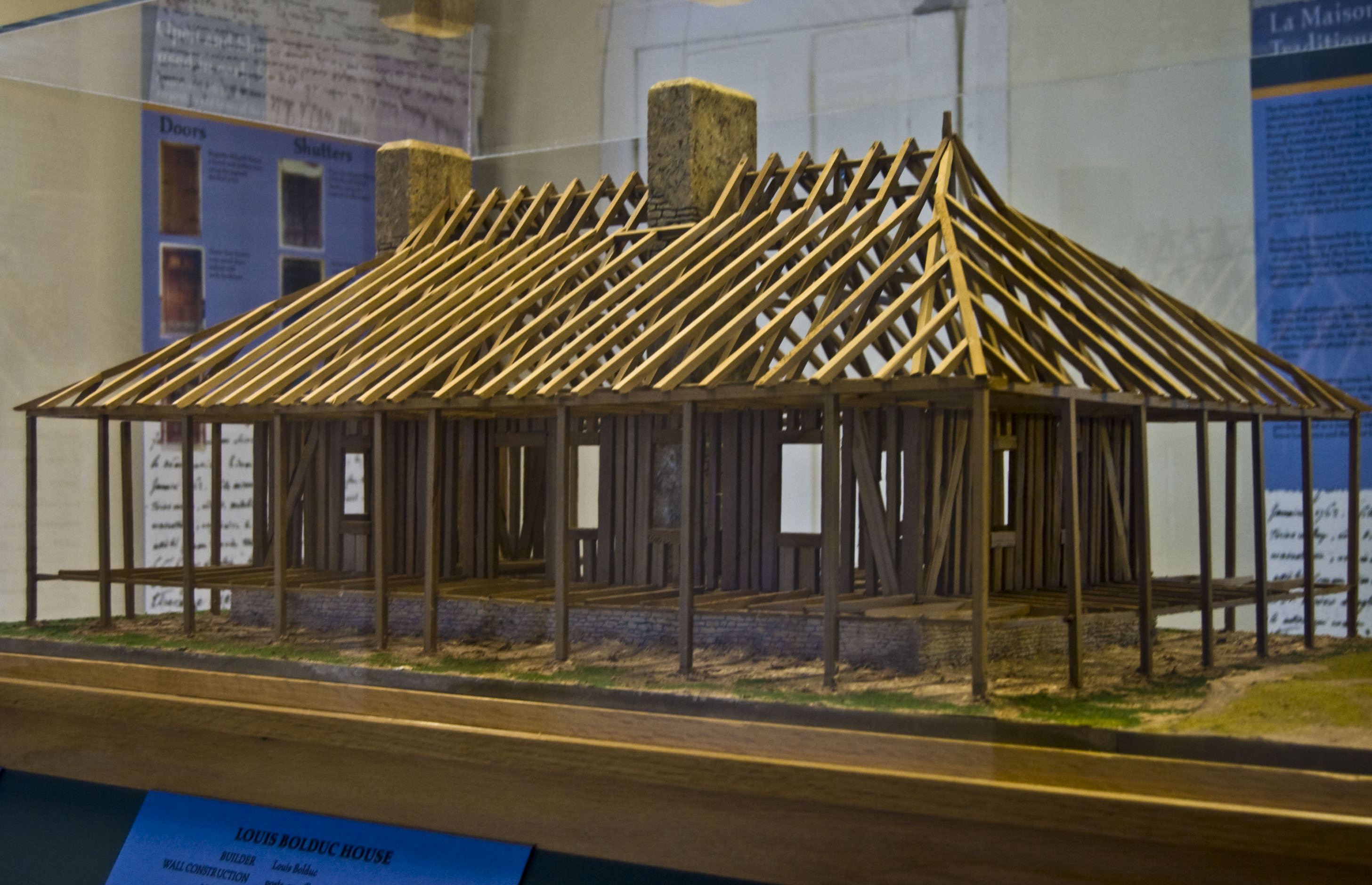
A model of the Maison Bolduc showing poteaux-sur-solle construction.

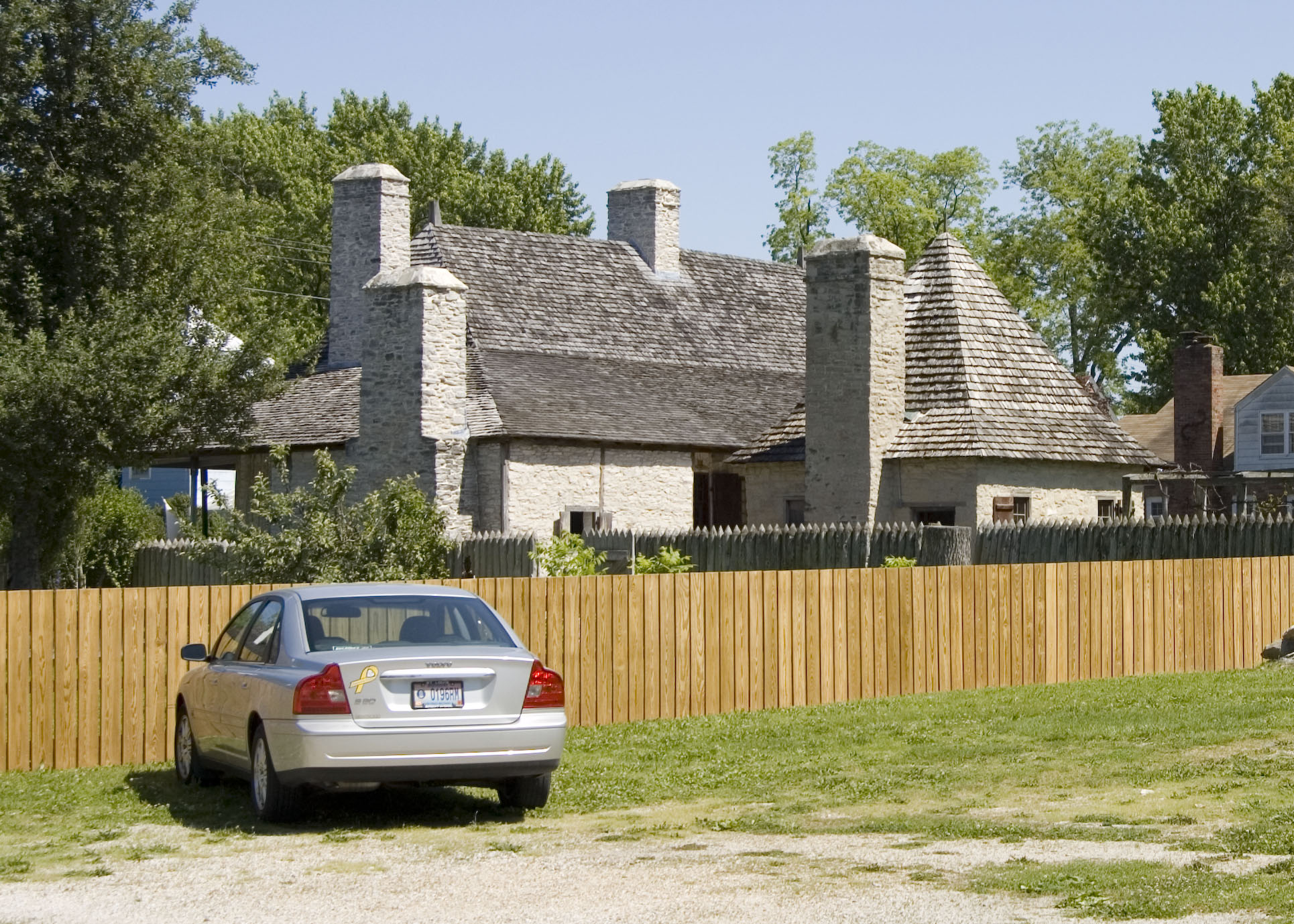
Maison Bolduc is an example of poteaux-sur-solle construction.

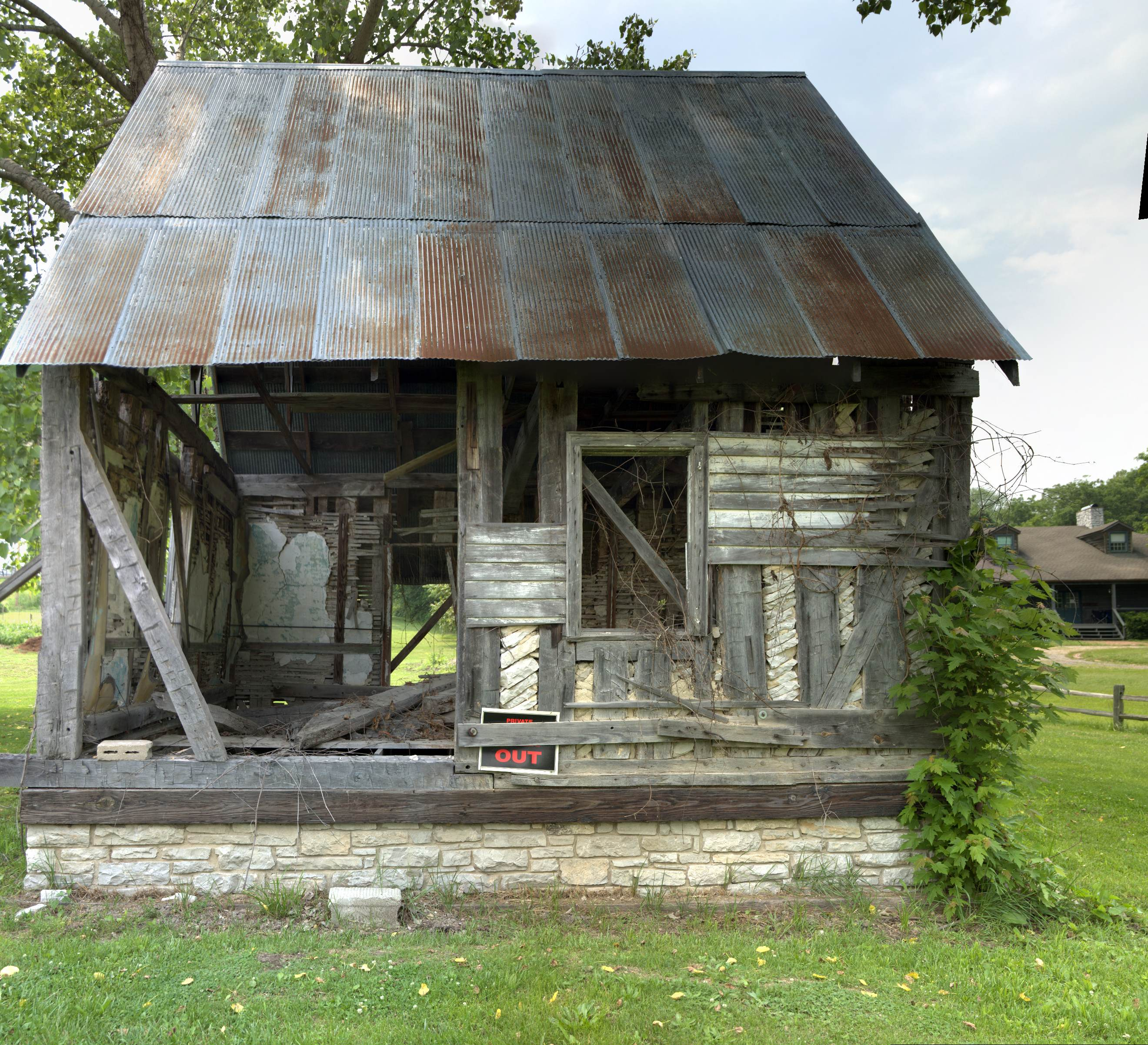
The Durand Cabin is an example of poteaux-sur-solle construction.

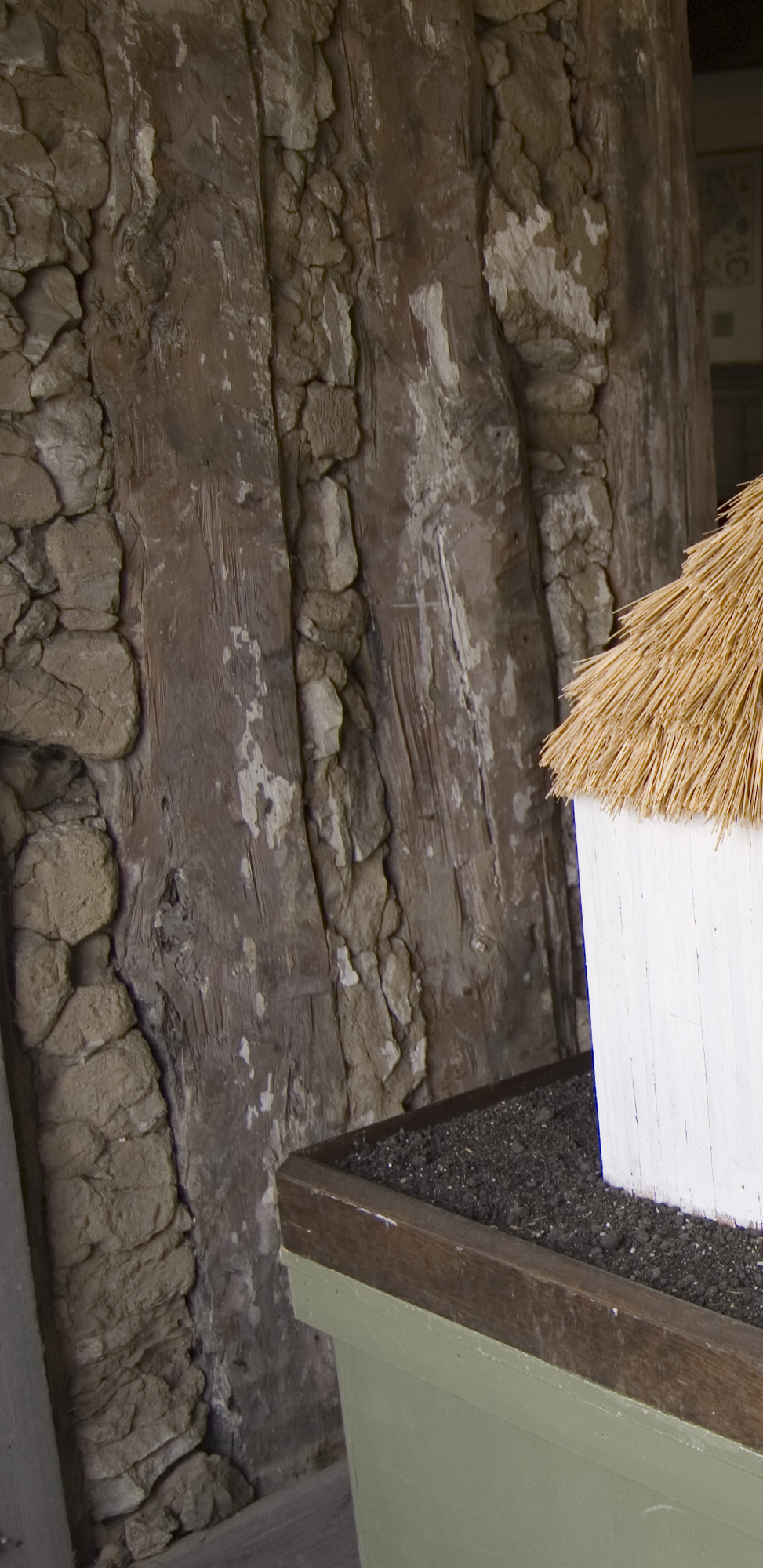
An example of bousillage in the Amoureux House in Ste. Genevieve, Missouri

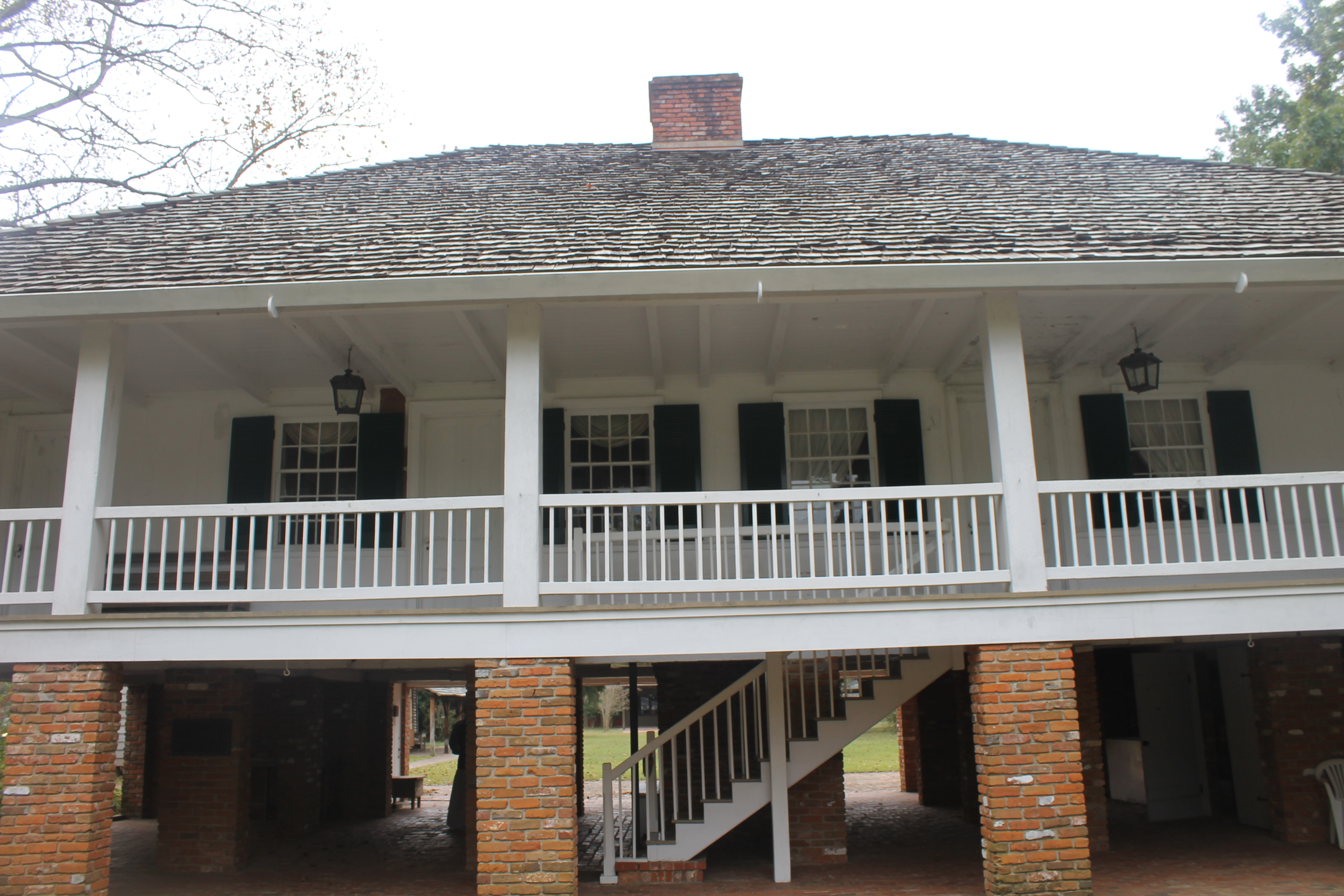
Kent Plantation House in Alexandria, Louisiana, constructed in 1800, is built partly of bousillage.

== See also ==
- La Maison de Guibourd
- Ste. Genevieve, Missouri
- New France
- French colonization of the Americas
- French architecture
- Poteaux-en-terre
- Badin-Roque House
- Cane River Lake
- Isle Brevelle
- Cane River Creole National Historical Park
