= Common Field Archaeological Site =

- Common Field Archeological Site
- U.S. National Register of Historic Places
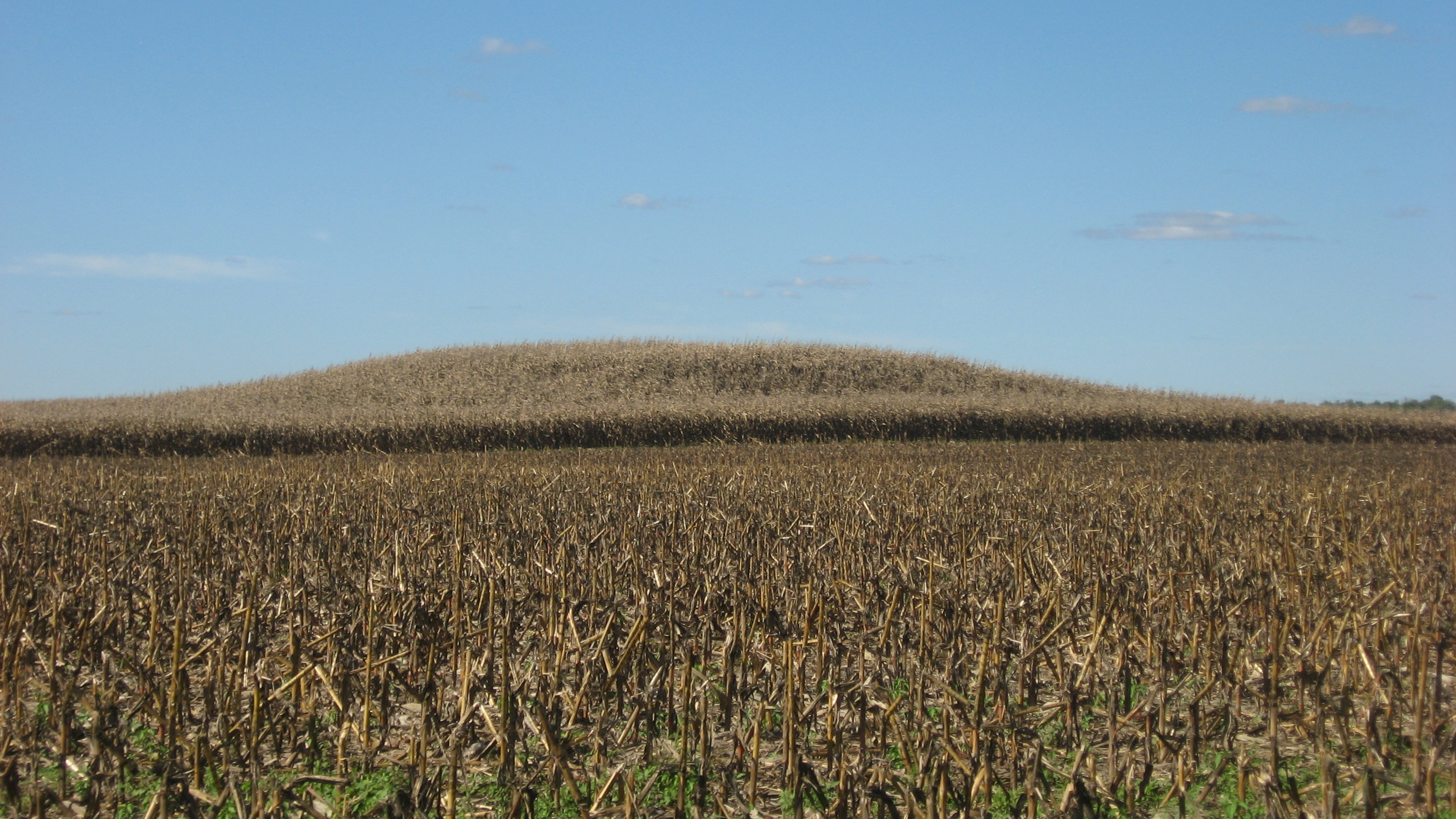
- Nearest city: Ste. Genevieve, Missouri
- NRHP reference No.: 69000306
- Added to NRHP: July 29, 1969

The Common Field Archaeological Site, designated by the Smithsonian trinomial 23-SG-100, is a prehistoric archaeological site near Ste. Genevieve, Missouri. Located in the bottom lands along the Mississippi River, it encompasses the remains of a Native American platform mound. The site is named after its location in the "common fields", an area of farmland laid out by French colonial settlers in narrow strips of land for cultivation.

The site was listed on the National Register of Historic Places in 1969.

== See also ==
- National Register of Historic Places listings in Ste. Genevieve County, Missouri
