= Kreilich Archaeological Site =

- Kreilich Archeological Site
- U.S. National Register of Historic Places
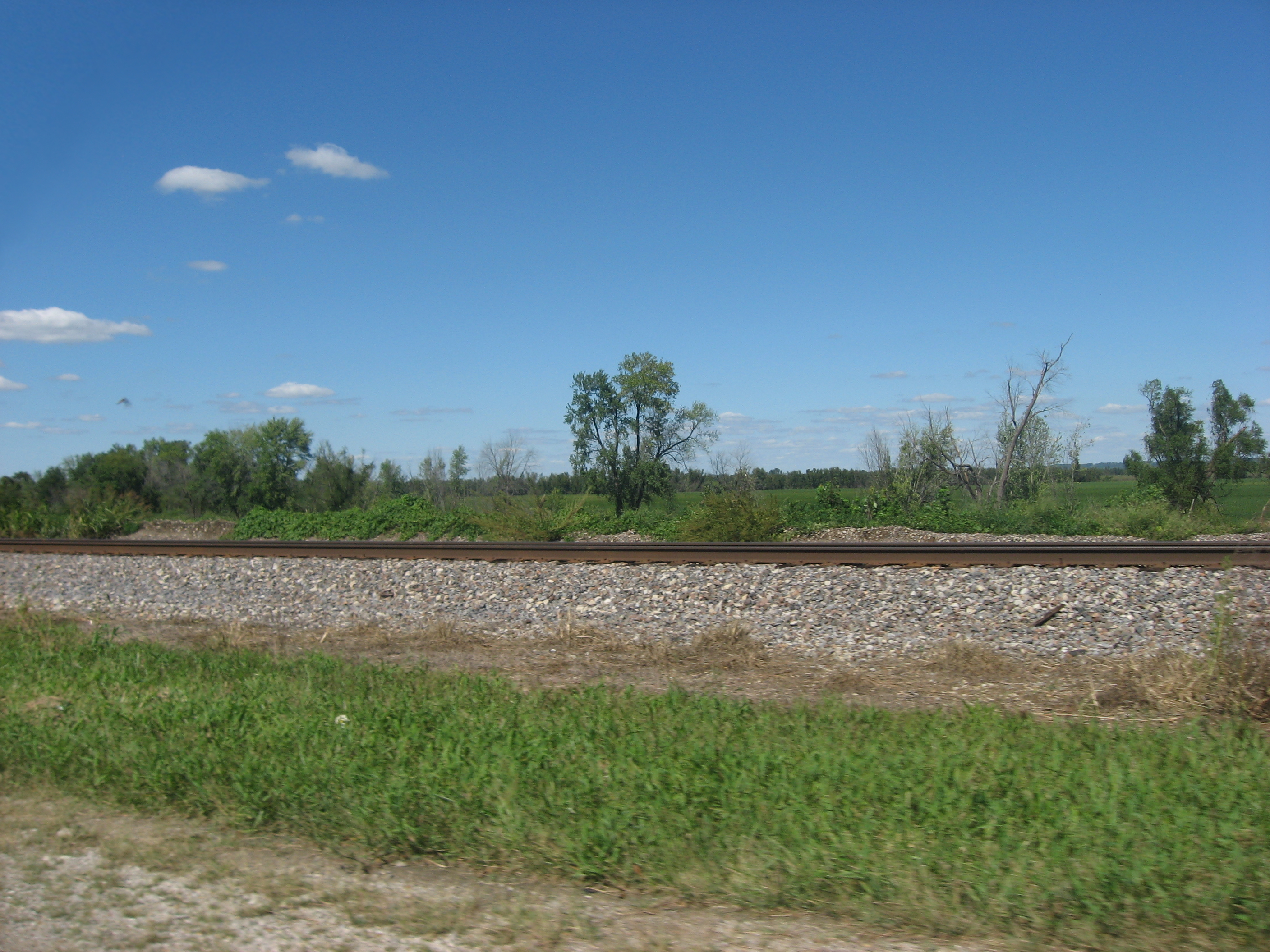
- Nearest city: Ste. Genevieve, Missouri
- NRHP reference No.: 69000308
- Added to NRHP: May 21, 1969

The Kreilich Archaeological Site, designated by the Smithsonian trinomial 23-SG-5, is an historical archaeological site near Ste. Genevieve, Missouri. It is located near the mouth of Saline Creek, it encompasses a complex of structures and landforms related to the processing of salt by early French colonists. The remains of stone salt furnaces survive, and archaeological investigation of the area in the 1980s has yielded pottery from the early 18th century.

The site was listed on the National Register of Historic Places in 1969.

== See also ==
- National Register of Historic Places listings in Ste. Genevieve County, Missouri
