= Louis Bolduc House =

Historic house in Missouri, United States

- U.S. National Register of Historic Places
- U.S. National Historic Landmark
- U.S. National Historic Landmark District – Contributing property
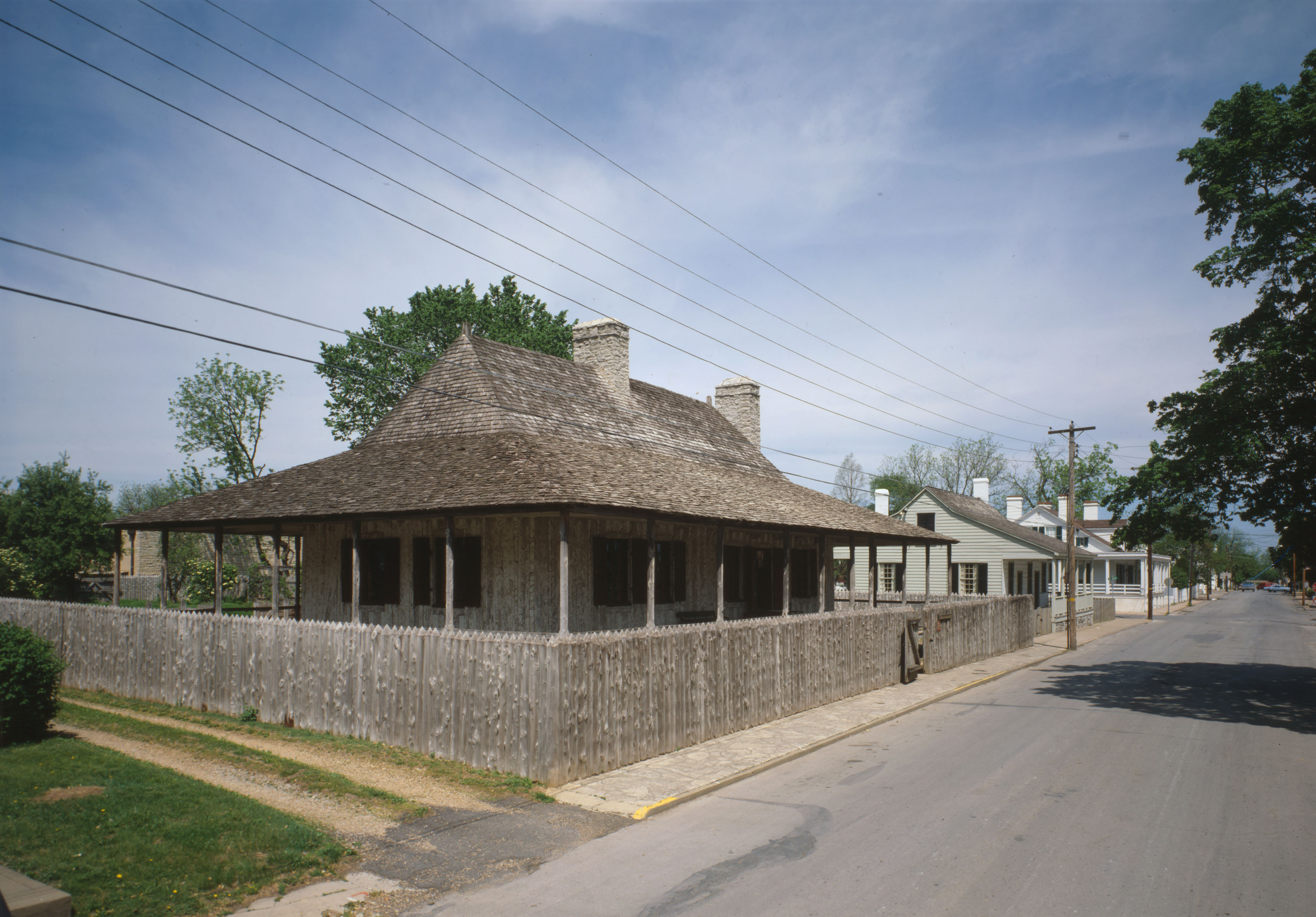
- Louis Bolduc Historic House

- Location within Missouri Location within the United States
- Interactive map showing the location of Louis Bolduc House
- Location: 123 S. Main St., Ste. Genevieve, Missouri
- Coordinates: 37°58′43″N 90°2′35″W
- Built: 1788
- Architectural style: French Colonial
- Part of: Ste. Genevieve Historic District (ID66000892)
- NRHP reference No.: 69000305

Significant dates
- Added to NRHP: April 16, 1969
- Designated NHL: April 15, 1970
- Designated NHLDCP: October 15, 1966

The Louis Bolduc House is a historic house museum owned and operated by French Colonial America (FCA), at 123 South Main Street in Ste. Geneviève, Missouri. It is an example of poteaux sur solle ("post-on-sill") vertical timber construction, and is located in what was one of the first European settlements in the present-day state of Missouri. The Bolduc House was the first historic structure in Ste. Genevieve to be authentically restored; the house is a prime illustration of the traditional French Creole Colonial architecture of the early 18th century in North America and was designated in 1970 as a National Historic Landmark. It is part of FCA's Centre for French Colonial Life's museum campus, and tickets for guided tours of Bolduc House may be obtained at the Centre's primary exhibit facility at 198 Market Street.

== History ==
Ste. Genevieve was founded in the mid-eighteenth century by settlers of French descent, who originally migrated from villages on the east bank of the Mississippi River, such as Prairie du Rocher, Illinois. Over time, residents also came from Canada, lower Louisiana and Caribbean island colonies such as Sainte Domingue. Even after administration of this region passed from France to Spain in the 1760s, following the end of the Seven Years' War, most of the residents in the region were of French descent. Among these was Louis Bolduc, who had come from Canada around 1760. The village flourished economically, primarily as a source of wheat, salt, lead and furs that were shipped down to New Orleans on the Mississippi River. Bolduc became a successful merchant at Sainte Genevieve, taking not only his own products downriver, but also carrying goods produced by other residents, which he sold or traded in return for a commission. Because of repeated flooding from the Mississippi River, with an especially bad occurrence in 1785, the people of Ste. Genevieve decided to relocate to a higher site further away from the river. After a new location was agreed upon, a grid-iron pattern of streets was laid out and the community was entirely moved from the original site during the late 1780s and early 1790s.

In the early to mid-1790s, Louis Bolduc built a one-story vertical timber house at the new village site, about three miles north of the first. Some historians believe the structure was built in two sections, the first of which was the north room. This probably was constructed as a multi-purpose "keeping room," where the family conducted most of its activities. It has a large stone fireplace at the north end, exposed ceiling joists and planking, and a wide-plank puncheon floor, made of logs cut flat on only one side, with the curved side laid down. A dendrochronology study done in the 1980s identified some wall timbers in this part of the house dating from the late 1780s, but those may have been salvaged from other earlier structures. Adjoining this room, and built in the same style as the north room, is a wide hallway that is believed to have been used by Bolduc to run his commission merchant business. In 1793-94 (based on timbers that also were dated during the same dendrochronology study), the large south room was built. It also utilizes vertical timber walls, but it is larger, has more windows, features a chair rail, and has a different type of ceiling, which is higher than the north room and hallway, and has a smooth plaster finish, giving it a somewhat less rustic appearance. The character of this room, combined with the overall larger size of the structure compared to other French Creole houses from this period, served to help demonstrate Bolduc's social status in the community and as a mark of his wealth.

The walls of the house were built with heavy oak timbers set vertically about six inches apart and infilled with bousillage, a mixture of mud, straw, lime, gravel and horsehair that hardened to a cement-like texture. The exterior was regularly painted with a lime whitewash to help protect the surface and discourage invasive insects. Diagonal timbers on each supporting wall added stability. The steep hip roof, covered with cedar shakes, was supported by heavy, hand-hewn Norman trusses held together by mortise and tenon joinery. It extends over the four sides of the house's porches to provide shade and cooling. The house is surrounded by a reconstructed stockade fence typical of the time (to keep out livestock that roamed in the area). The southwest corner of the gallery features an attached stone kitchen that was added in the early 19th century, probably after Bolduc had died, by his widow and a nephew who still occupied the structure. Period-style kitchen and herb gardens have have been planted on the property, which also features a reconstructed stone bake house that the architect constructed, based on a photograph from the mid-19th century which showed a similar structure that had been built in St. Louis in the late 18th century (most historians agree that the actual original detached summer kitchen that was on the property probably was another vertical timber building).

Located at 123 South Main Street in downtown Ste. Genevieve, the property was owned by Bolduc family descendants until the late 1940s when it was sold to The National Society of The Colonial Dames of America in the State of Missouri. (NCSDA/MO). It was restored under the direction of architectural historian, Dr. Ernest Allen Connally. As may be seen by a comparison of the photos below, the house was restored to show its original Creole colonial style, whose elements were largely intact under later changes. During the restoration, the Missouri Dames fully furnished it with original items dating from the mid-18th to the early 19th centuries - including some artifacts that had belonged to the Bolduc family - and opened the house to the public for guided tours. In 1970 the house was designated a National Historic Landmark. It is a contributing property in the Ste. Genevieve Historic District, which has National Historic Landmark status. In 2017, NSCDA/MO created a separate private nonprofit organization, French Colonial America, to provide professional programming and administrative services for their growing museum campus, which included the Bolduc House. In 2020, the house was transferred to ownership of FCA, although the Missouri Dames maintained ownership of the artifact collection they had assembled to furnish the house, to maintain a role in the preservation and interpretation of the structure. At present guided tours of Bolduc House provided by professional staff are available for the public year-round, seven days per week (except major holidays such as Christmas and New Year's Day).

== Photos of the Bolduc House ==
=== Recent ===
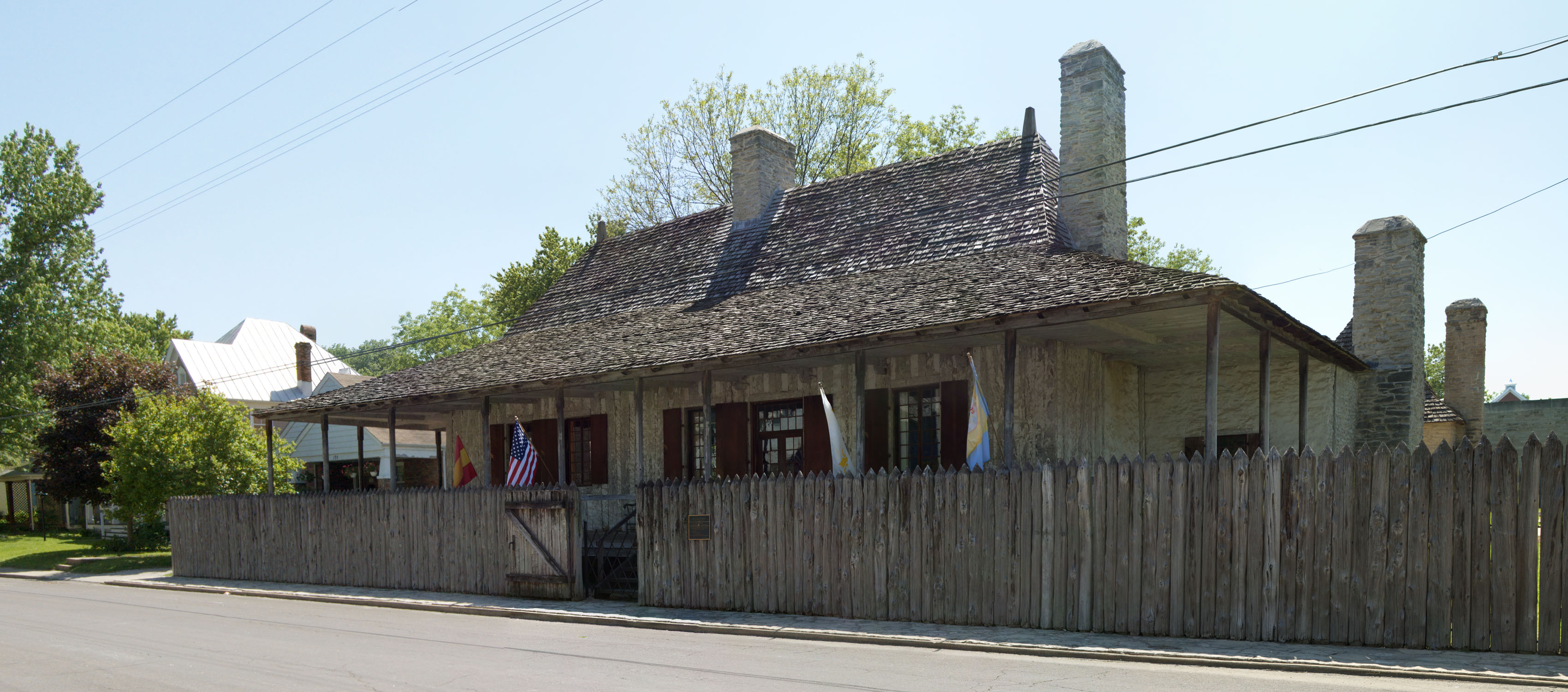
Front view, showing post-on-sill construction and bousillage infill.

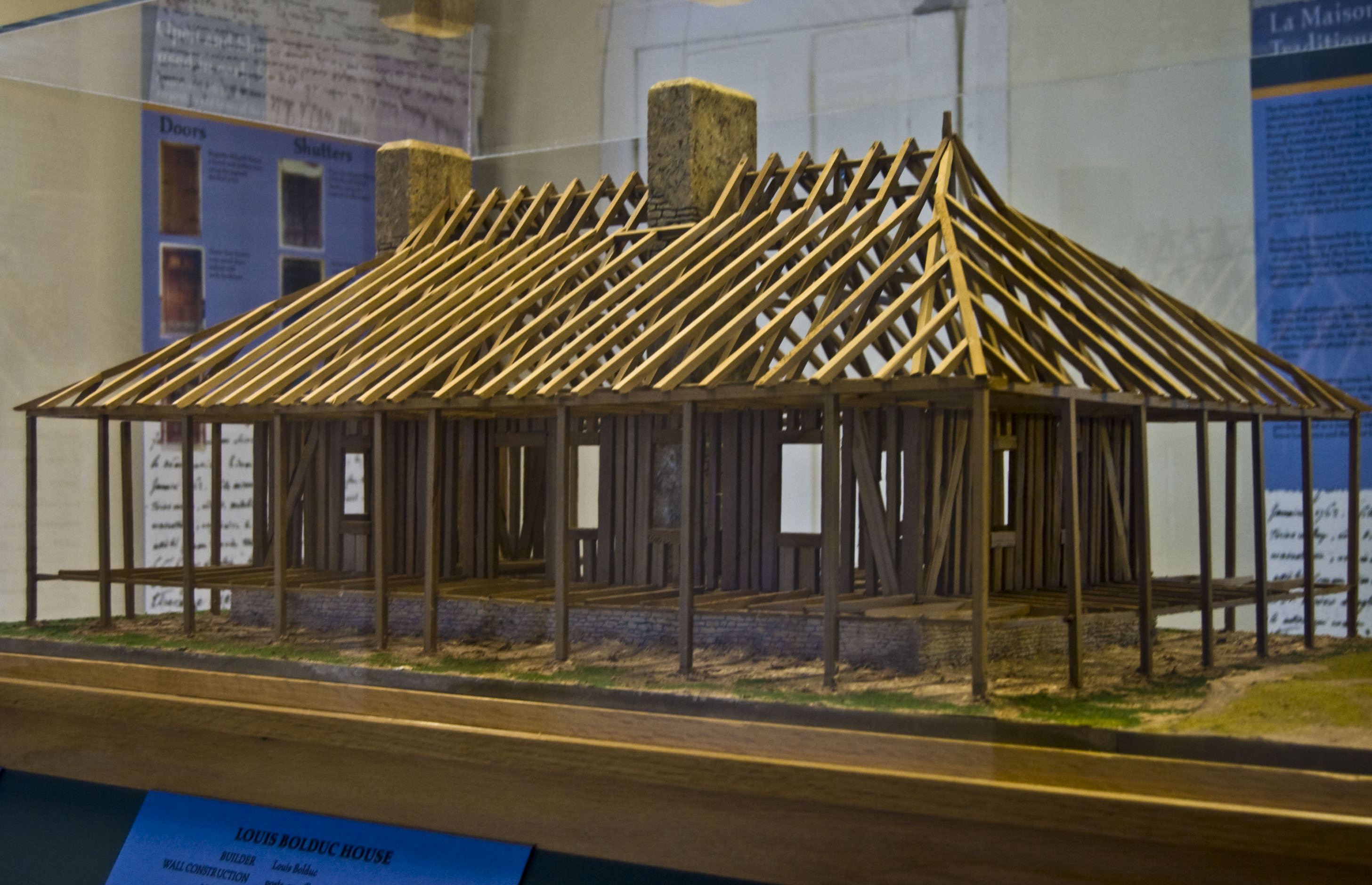
Model of the Bolduc House; shows diagonal framing timbers

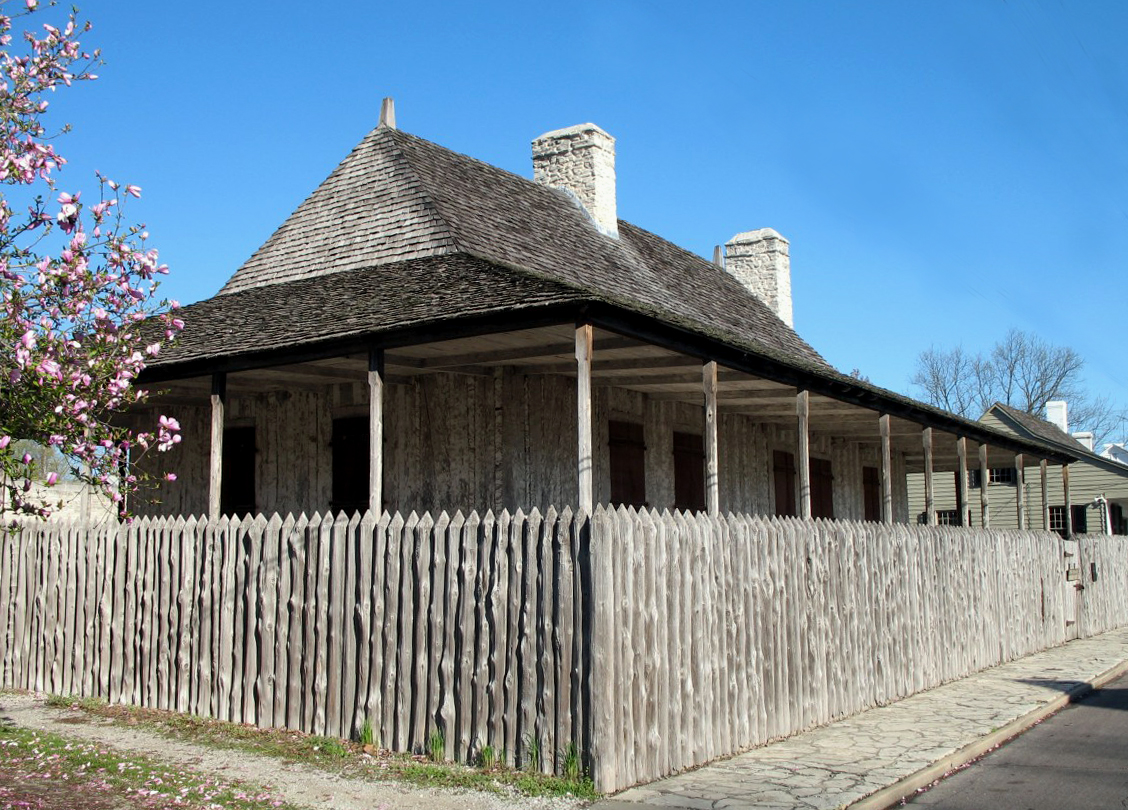
View of typical stockade fence; also view of side and front of house

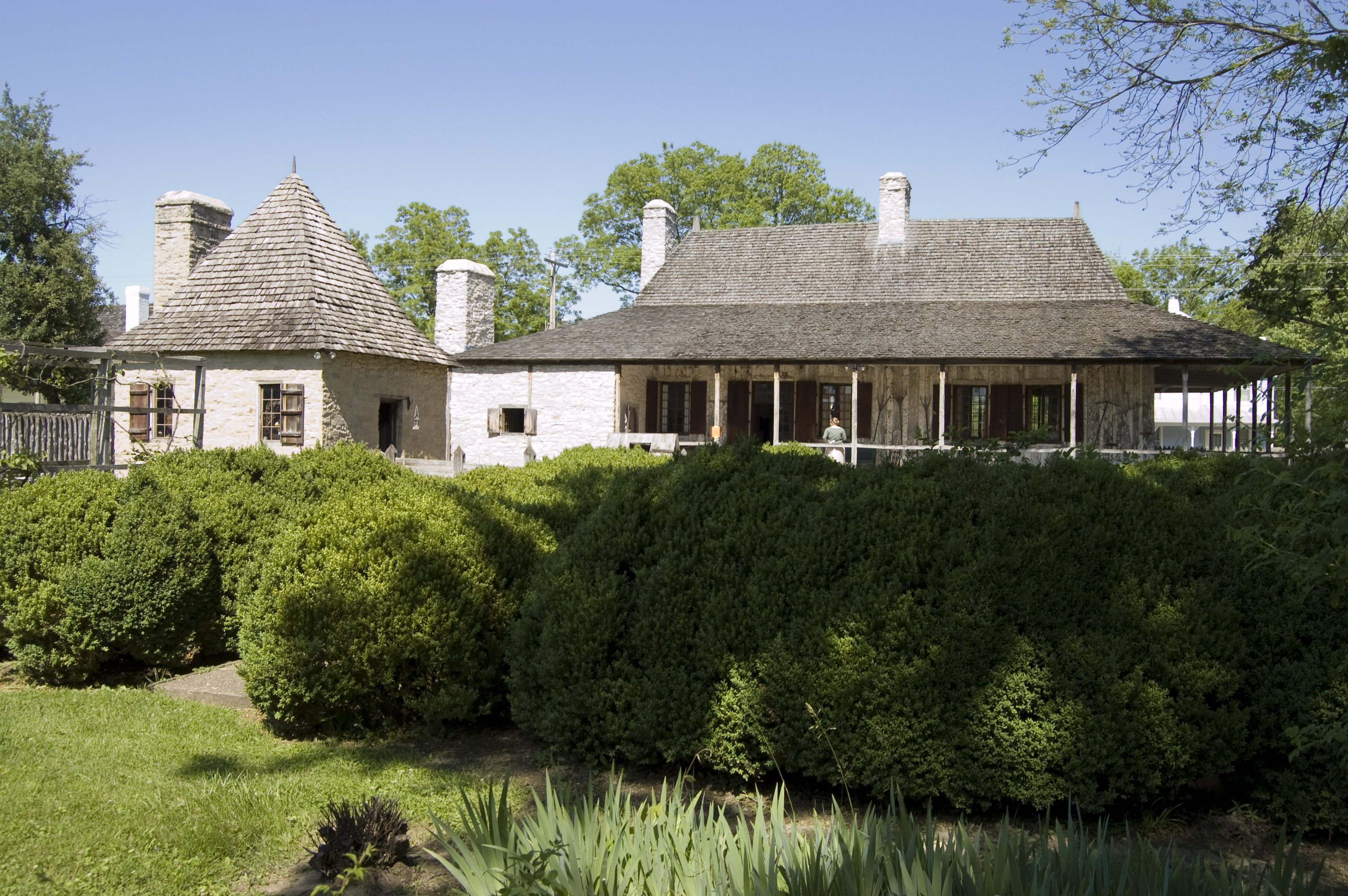
Garden area of the property, showing detached kitchen and rear of house.

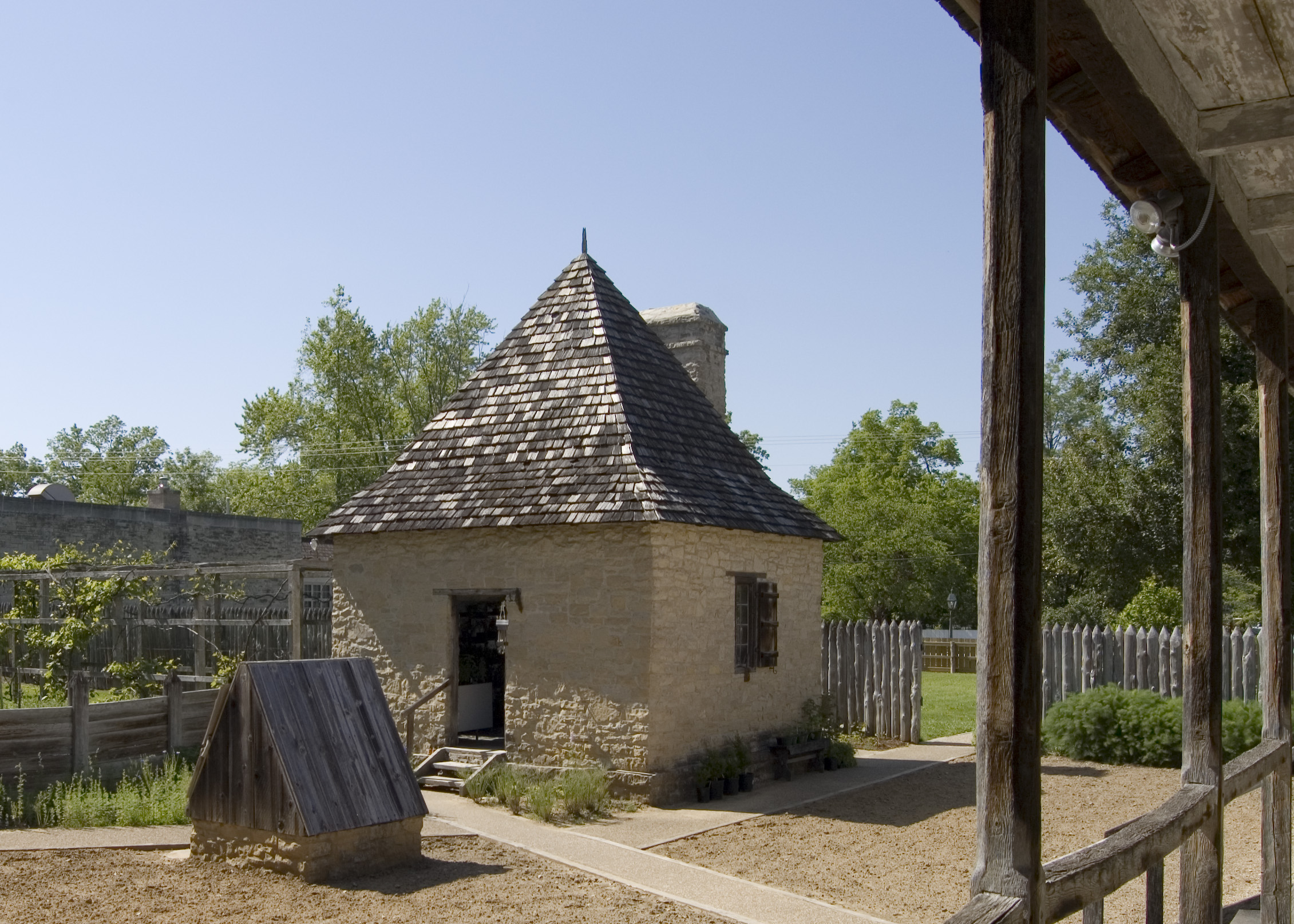
Reconstructed bake building at rear of house, ca. 1950s

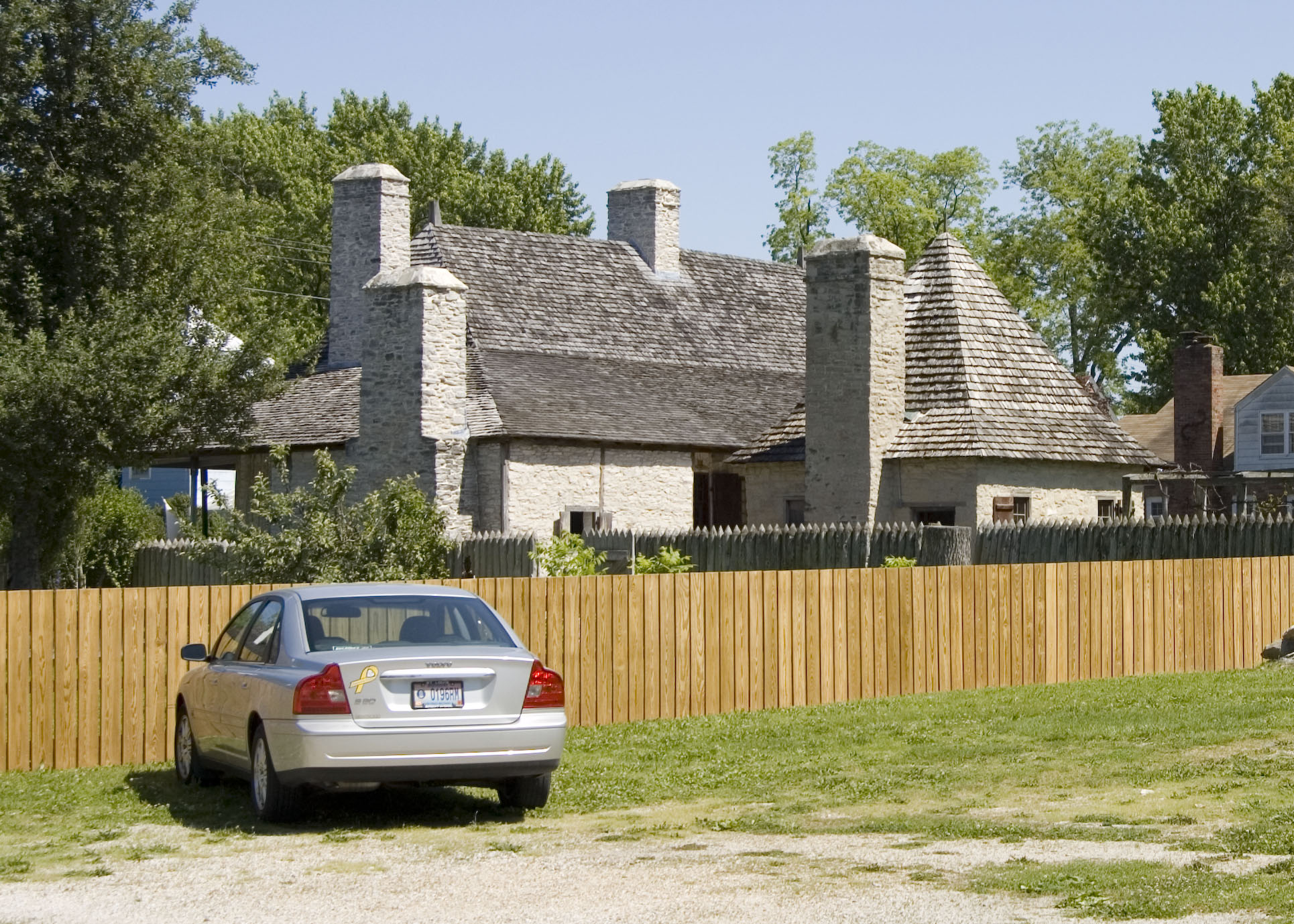
Rear view of house and reconstructed bake house

=== Archival ===
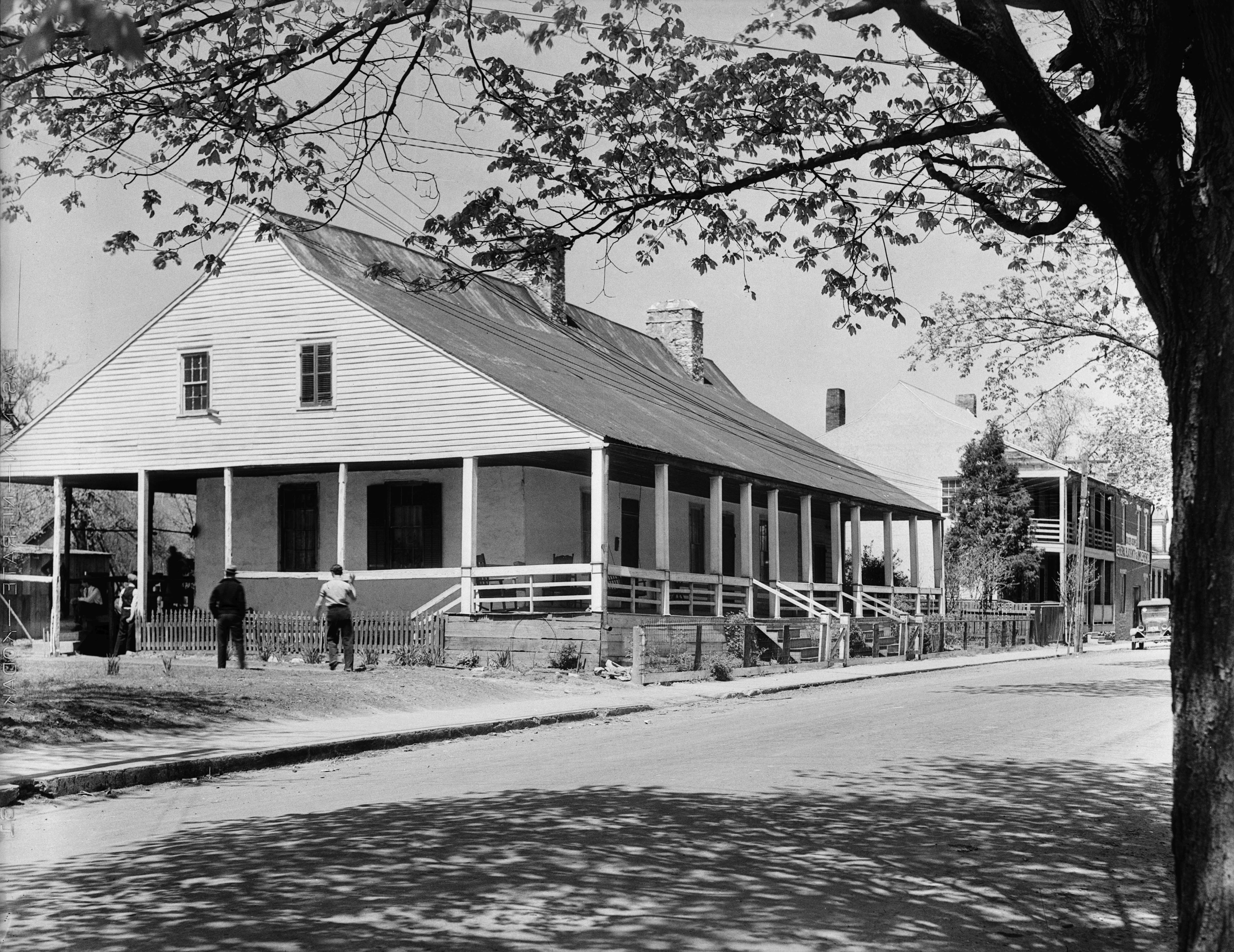
1930s–40s photo of the front of the house

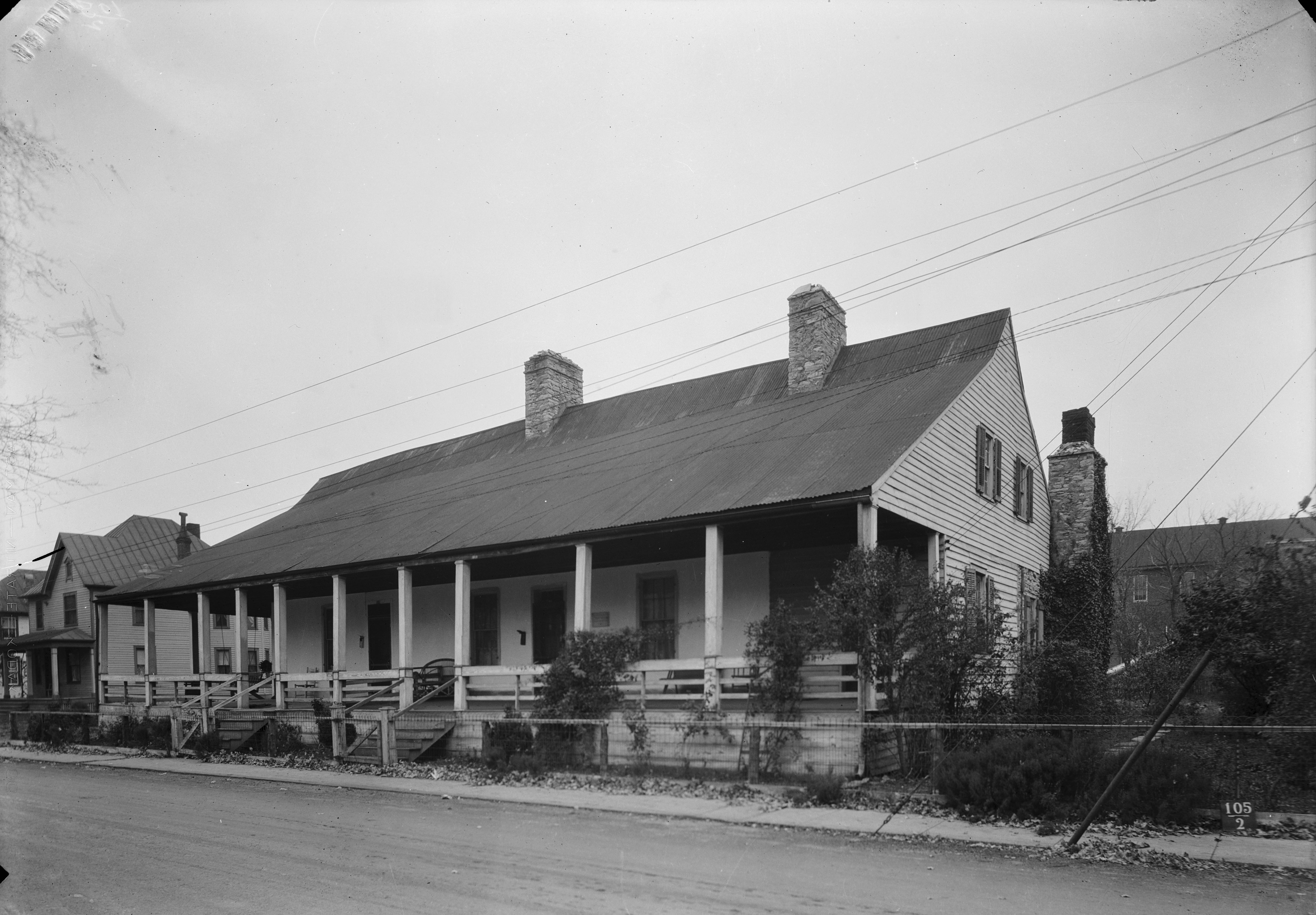
1936 photo of the front and side

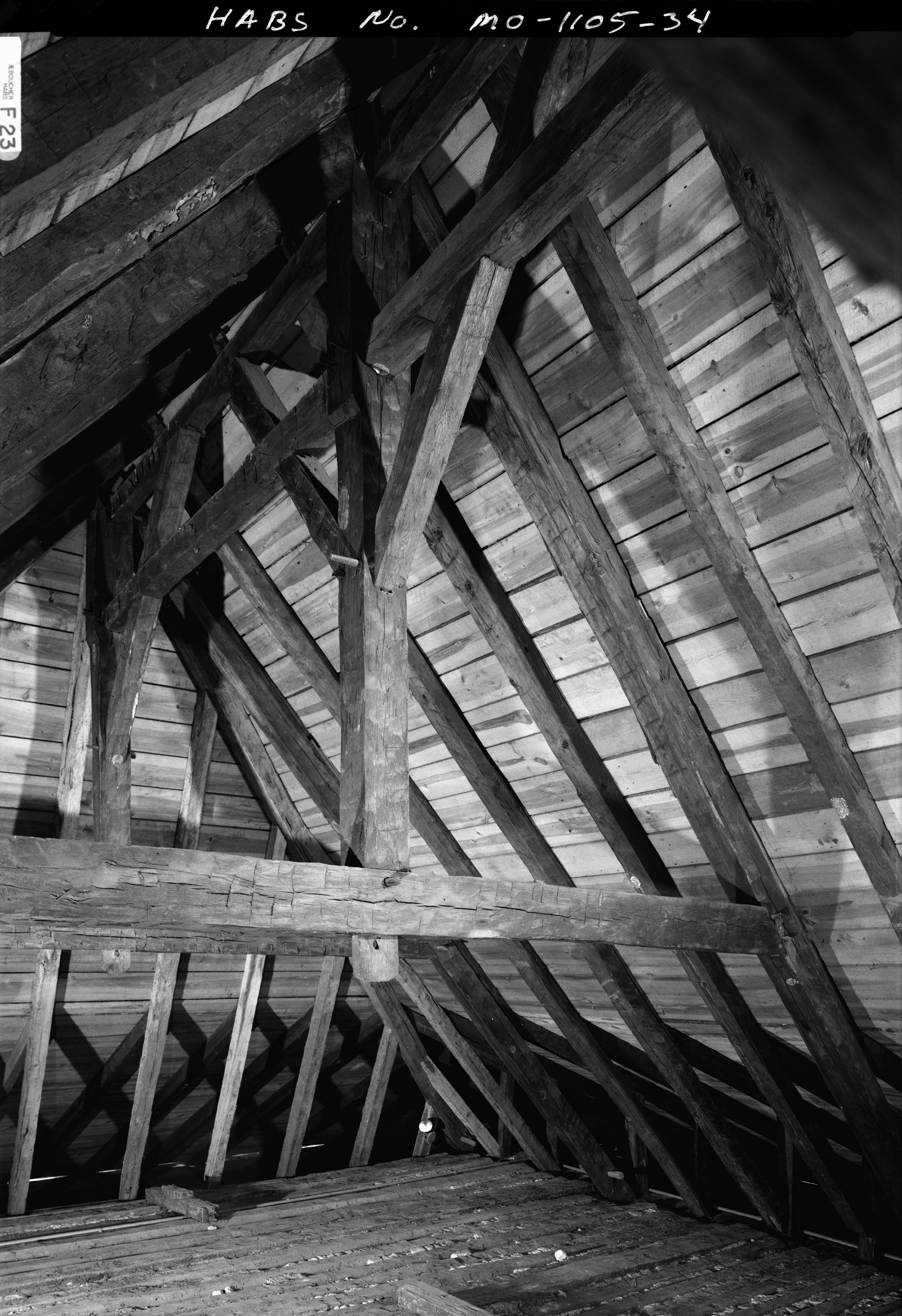
Norman truss components in the attic

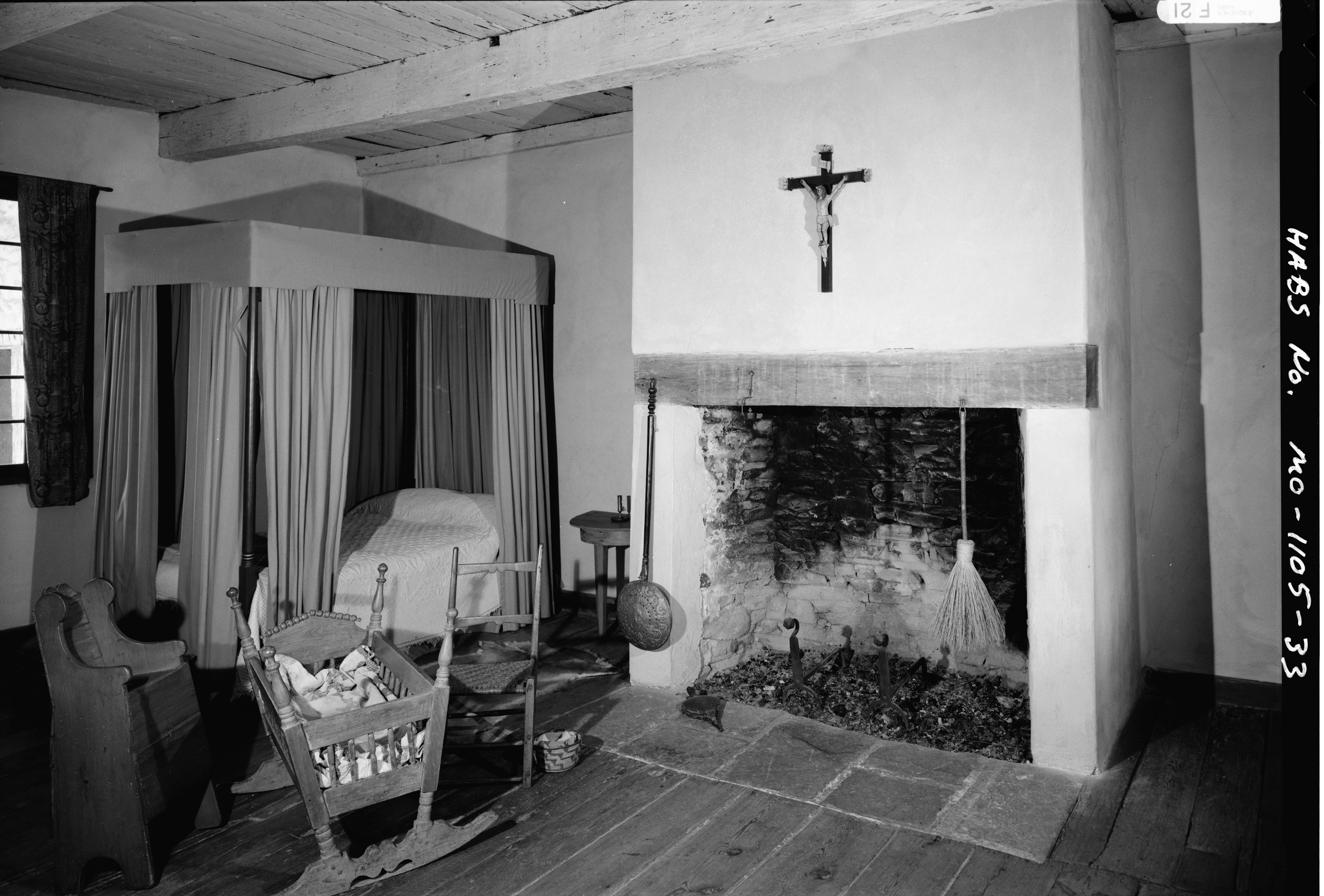
Restored bedroom

== See also ==
- List of National Historic Landmarks in Missouri
- List of the oldest buildings in Missouri
- National Register of Historic Places listings in Ste. Genevieve County, Missouri
