= Poteaux-sur-sol =

Style of timber framing

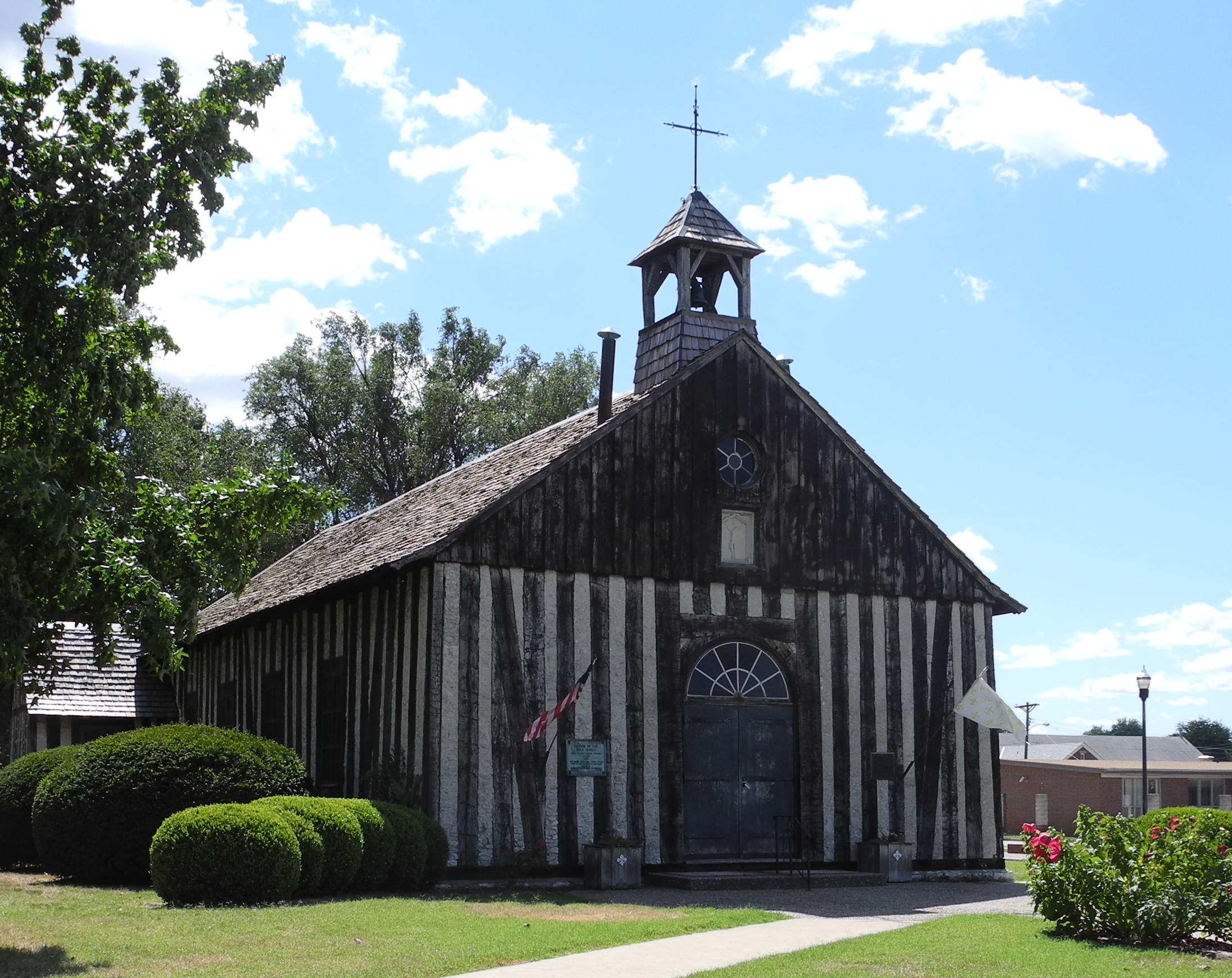
Holy Family Church in Cahokia, Illinois, was built of walnut timbers in the poteaux-sur-sol style in 1799, replacing a similar structure built in 1699.

Poteaux-sur-sol ("posts on a sill" – sol is also spelled sole and solle) is a style of timber framing in which relatively closely spaced posts rest on a timber sill. Poteaux-en-terre and pieux-en-terre are similar, but the closely spaced posts extend into the ground rather than resting on a sill on a foundation, and therefore are a type of post in ground construction. Poteaux-sur-sol is similar to the framing style known in the United Kingdom as close studding. Poteaux-sur-sol has also, confusingly, been used for other types of timber framing which have a sill timber such as post-and-plank, but this is considered incorrect by some scholars.

Poteaux-sur-sol is a part of American historic carpentry but is known by its French name in North America, as it was used by French and French-Canadian people in the region historically known as New France. Besides its appearance in French colonial architecture, it was also used in the 19th century by Ukrainian peasants living on the open steppes, or anywhere there was a timber shortage.

== United States ==
In the present-day United States, houses in this style can be found in Ste. Genevieve, Missouri; Prairie du Rocher, Illinois, Cahokia Heights, Illinois, East Carondelet, Illinois and former French settlements in Louisiana—all former parts of New France (La Louisiane). Most are listed on the National Register of Historic Places; Maison Bolduc is a National Historic Landmark.

== Gallery ==
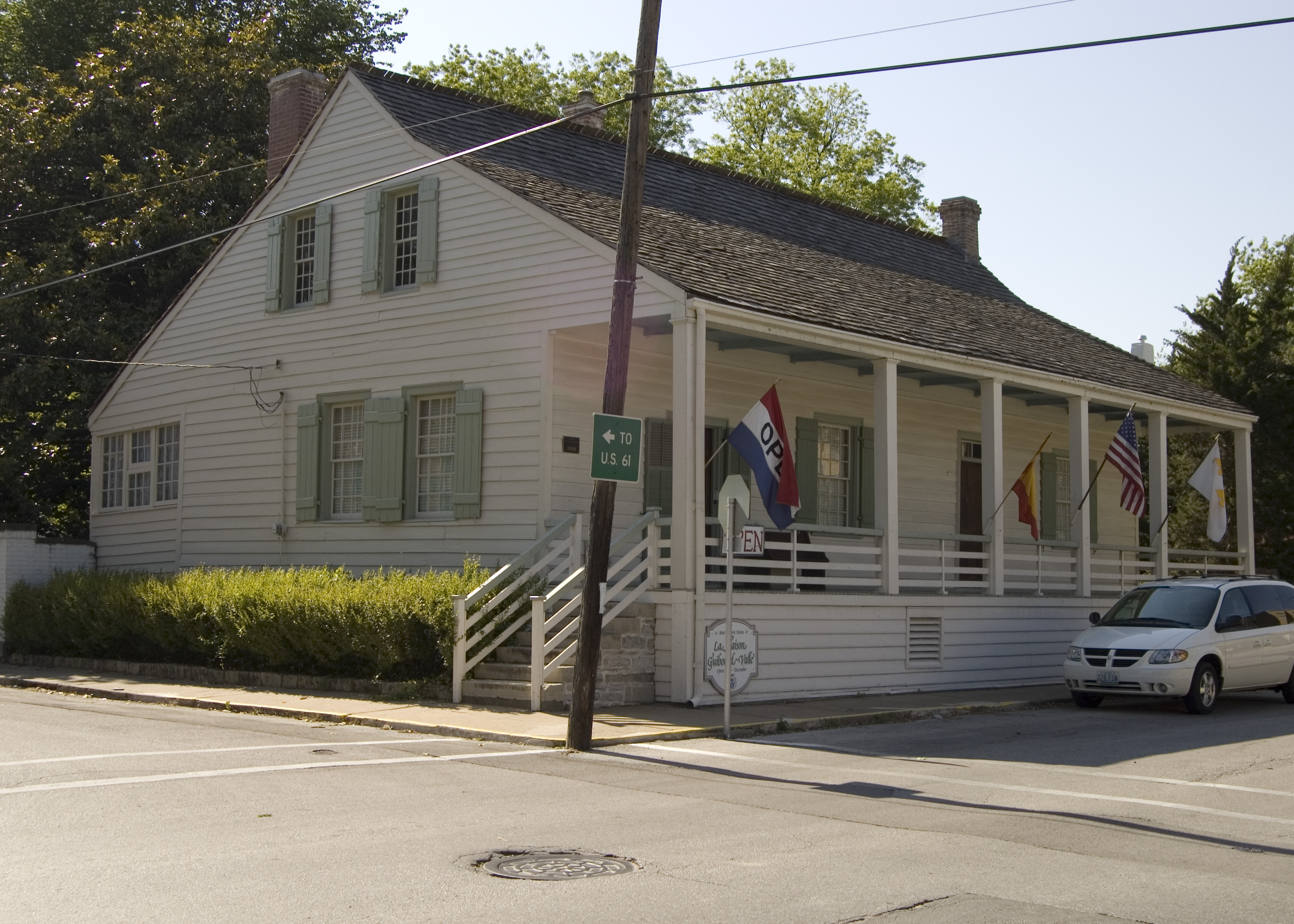
Jacques Guibourd Historic House, c1806. Ste. Genevieve, MO An example of poteaux-sur-sol construction.

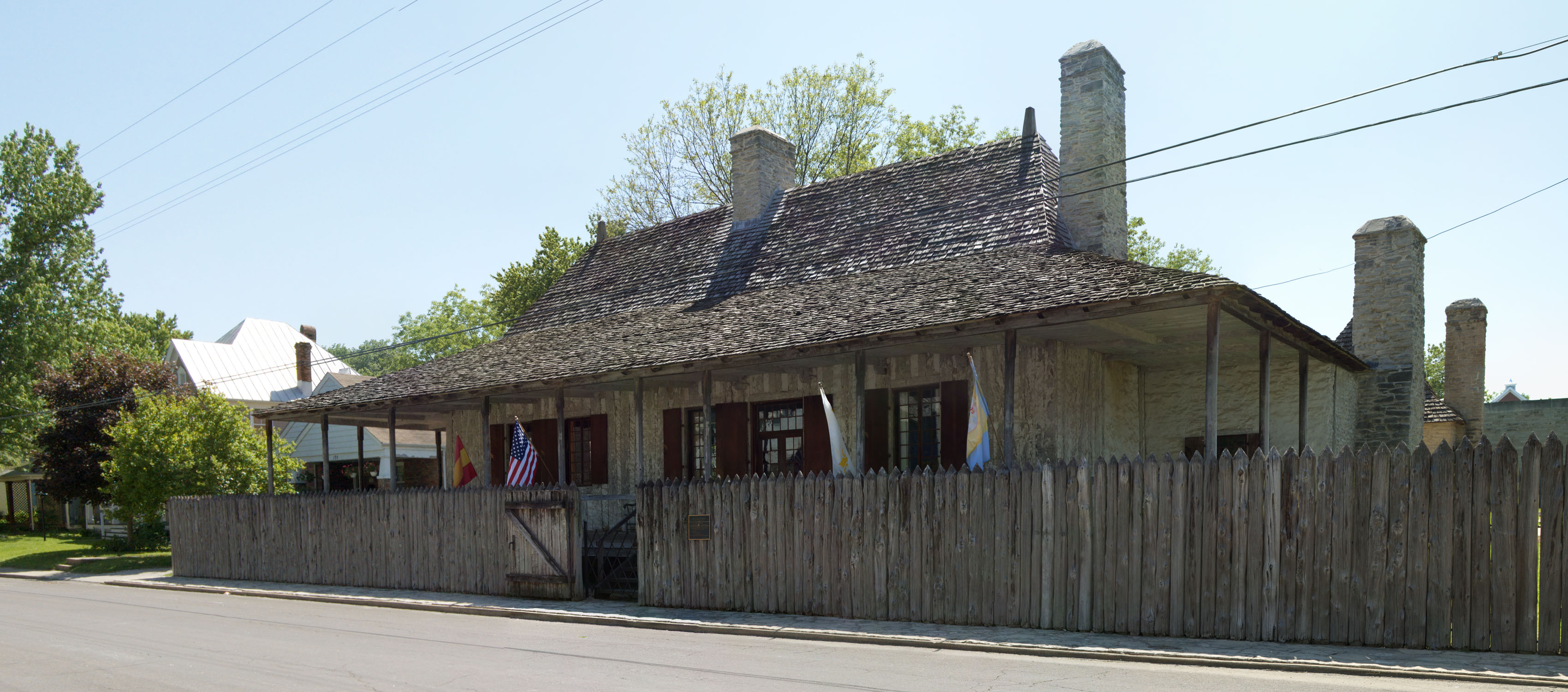
Front view of Louis Bolduc House, Ste. Genevieve. Shows poteaux-sur-sol construction and bousillage infill.

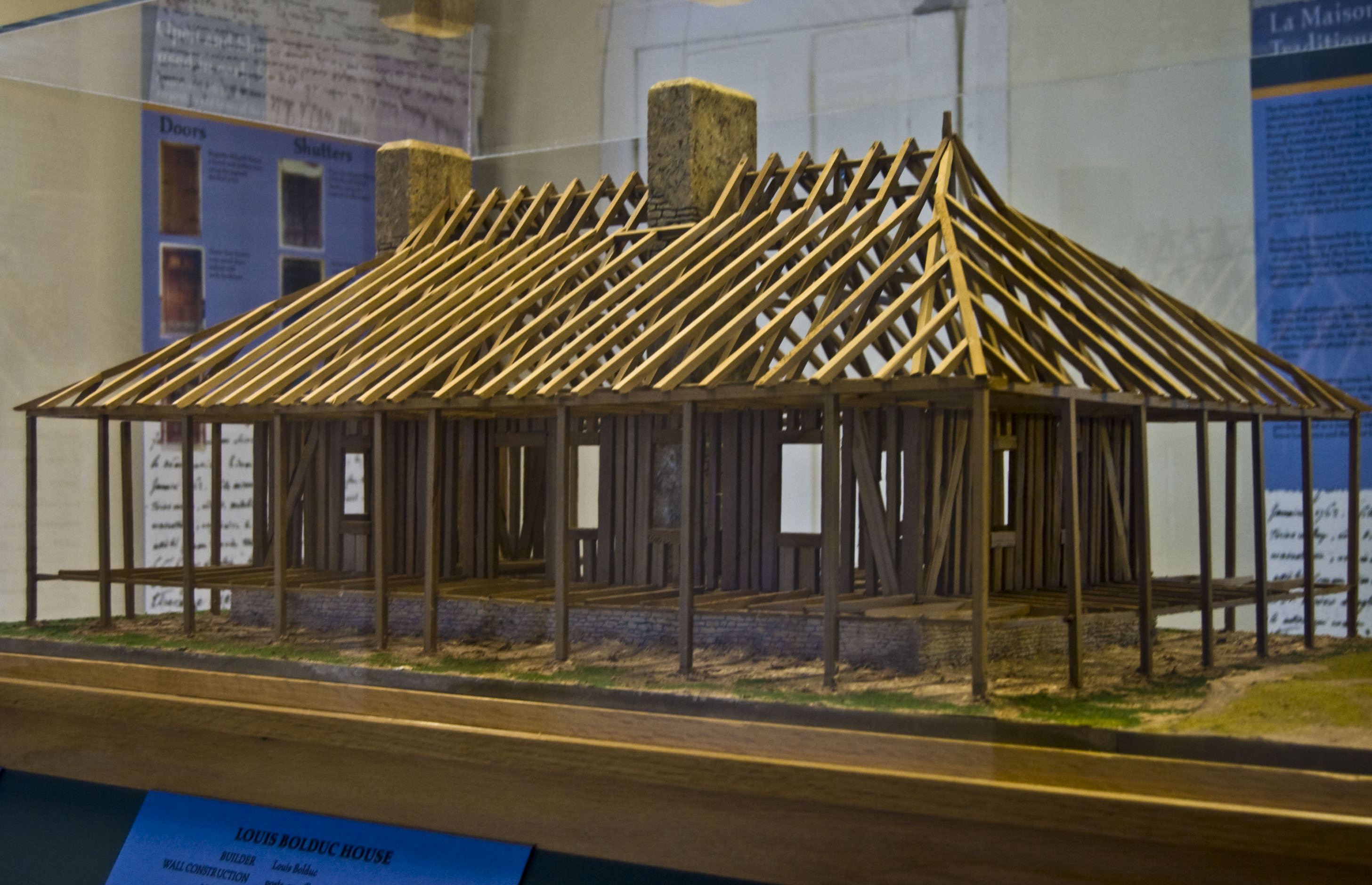
A model of the Maison Bolduc in Ste. Genevieve, showing poteaux-sur-sol construction.

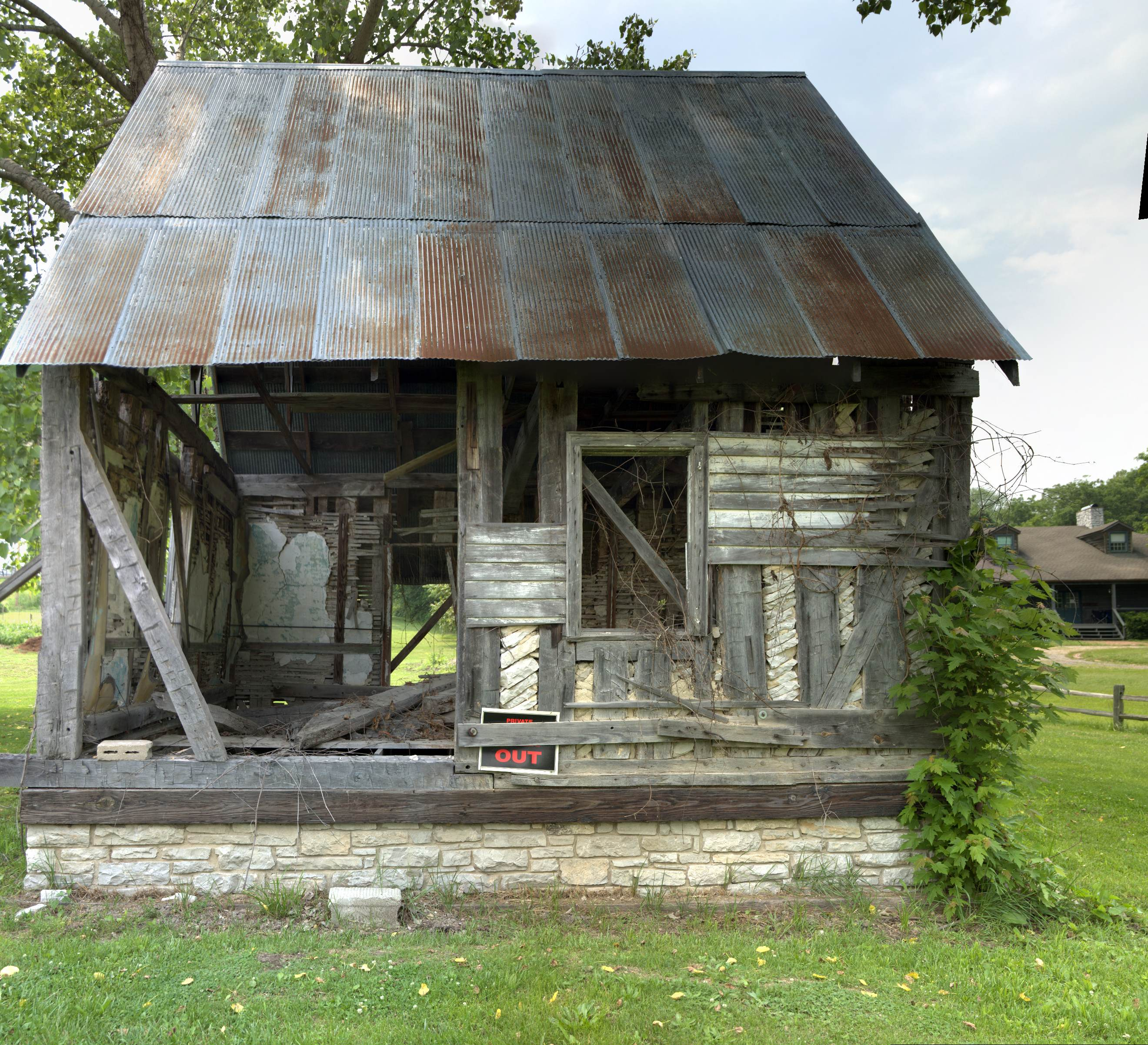
The Durand Cabin in Ste. Genevieve is an example of poteaux-sur-sol construction.

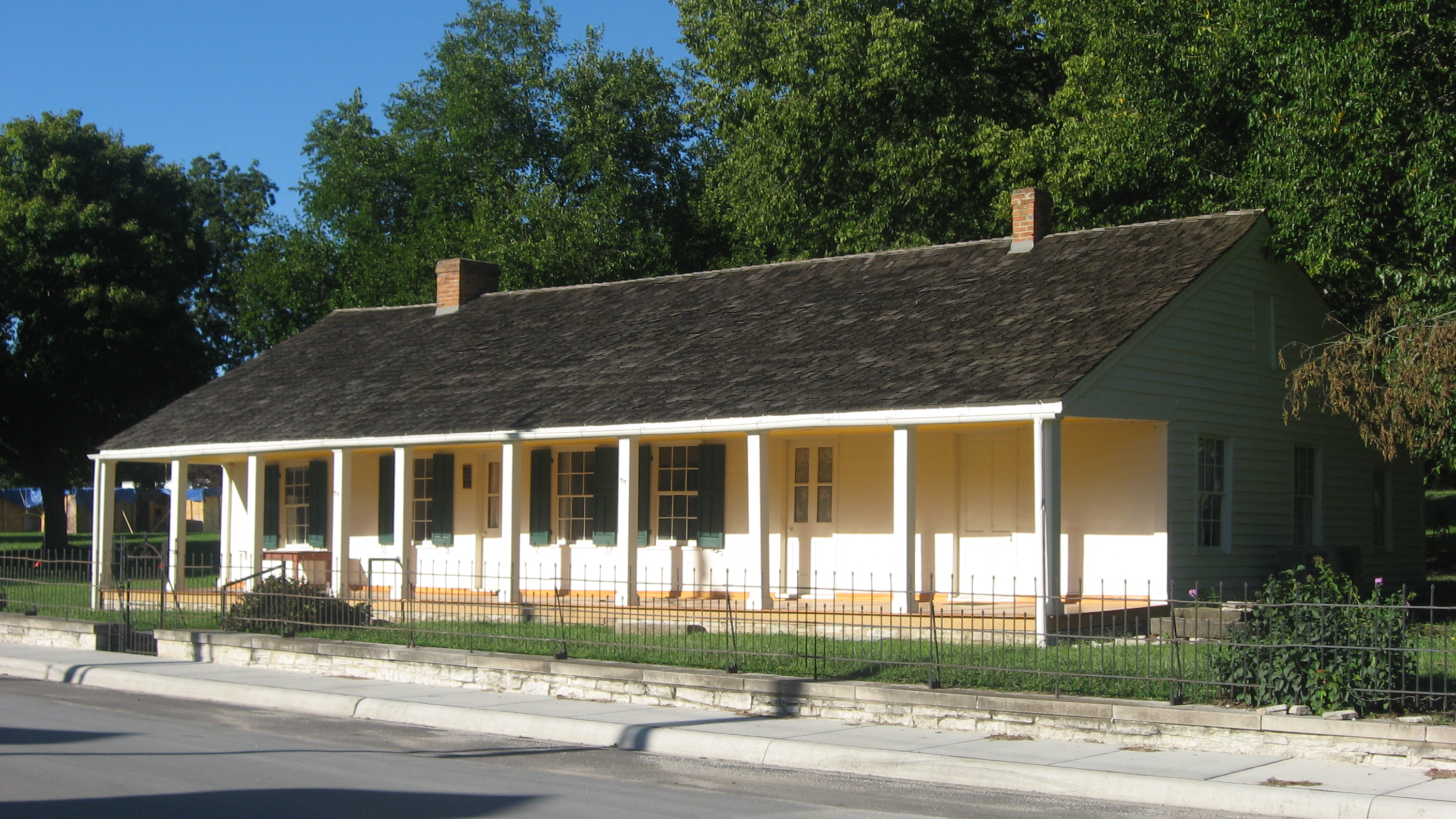
Creole House in Prairie du Rocher, Illinois, built 1800, expanded with stud-based construction and sided in 1858.

== See also ==
- French architecture
- French colonization of the Americas
- Creole House
- Pierrotage
