= Jacques Guibourd Historic House =

- Jacques Dubreuil Guibourd House
- U.S. National Register of Historic Places
- U.S. National Historic Landmark District – Contributing property
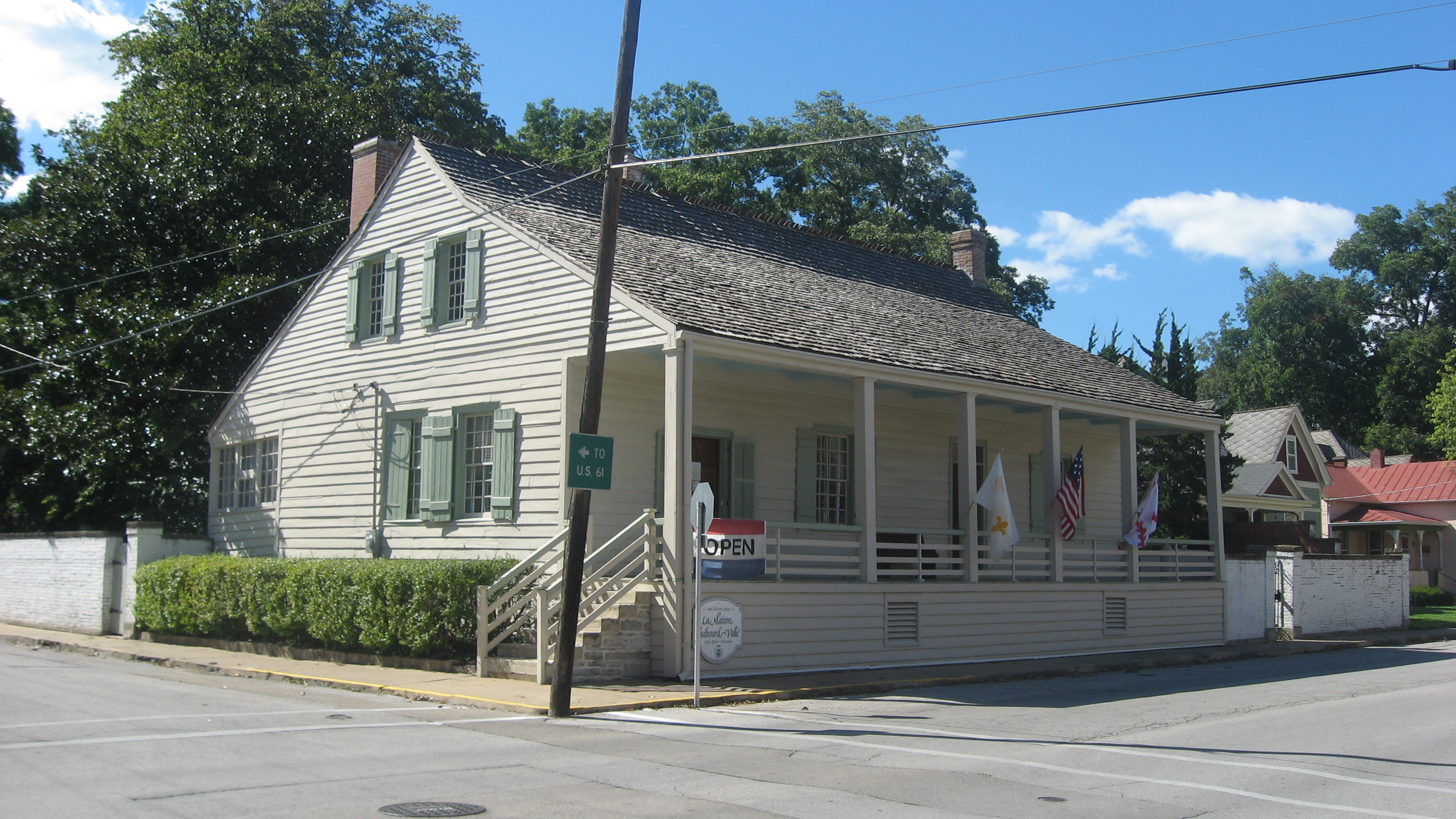
- Front and side of the house

- Location within Missouri Location within the United States
- Location: Northwestern corner of 4th and Merchant Sts., Ste. Genevieve, Missouri
- Coordinates: 37°58′48″N 90°2′53″W
- Built: 1800
- Architectural style: French Colonial
- Part of: Ste. Genevieve Historic District (ID66000892)
- NRHP reference No.: 69000307

Significant dates
- Added to NRHP: May 21, 1969
- Designated NHLDCP: October 9, 1960

The Guibourd House, also known as La Maison de Guibourd, is an example of poteaux-sur-solle (vertical post on sill or foundation) sealed with bouzillage (usually a mixture of clay and grass) construction. The structure was built around 1806 and was the home of Jacques Jean Rene Guibourd and his family.

The basic architecture of the Guibourd House is very similar to other Creole-French structures around the town and throughout the French inhabited regions of the Illinois Country/territory, eastern Canada and the Louisiana territory.

The structure's design has been changed only slightly over the years to accommodate the needs of the various residents, but overall retains much of the original character and style of the early 19th century French Creole architecture. The house had originally been built with 'galleries' (or wide porches) surrounding the house to keep the interior cool in the summer and the snow off in the winter.

The slave quarters or kitchen was added a few years later. The kitchen building was made of brick and detached from the main house due the added heat of cooking during the summer months, the smoke associated with cooking that would linger on cloth furnishings, and finally, because the French considered the smell of cooking to be offensive. (Contrary to the myth that kitchens were separate from the house due to the dangers of fire in the food preparation areas, extensive research has been done on the subject with no substantial facts to back it up. Refer to the book Death by Petticoat, by Mary Theobald, Colonial Williamsburg Press.) The Guibourd kitchen was built in a semi-attached fashion, under one corner of the porch. This proved invaluable for the family and slaves when serving meals to be able to keep them hot, dry and timely. The Guibourd House has one of the few original kitchen structures and slave quarters of this time period in Ste. Genevieve.

The woodwork found in Creole houses is similar to that of contemporaneous American houses, being fashioned probably by the same craftsmen. Glass was used early; the Guibourd house in Ste. Genevieve still has two pairs of casement windows similar to those found in Canada and Louisiana. Hardware and nails for Creole houses were imported at an early date, and three wrought-Iron door latches found in Ste. Genevieve show a close affinity to those of Quebec. The interior walls were often plastered and white-washed, and in more luxurious homes were sometimes frescoed or painted in panels, as in the Laclede-Chouteau house; but the ceilings were left open to show the carefully shaped beams (soUveaux), with their beaded moulding, and the attic flooring. Shrines and tall wooden crosses on inscribed stone pedestals added to the European appearance of the early settlements.

The immigration which began about the time of the American Revolution, and reached its full tide after the War of 1812, destroyed most of the Creole architectural traditions. Charles Dickens, visiting St. Louis in 1842, found that "In the old French portions of the town the thoroughfares are narrow and crooked, and some of the houses are quaint and picturesque, being built of wood, with tumble-down galleries ... and an abundance of crazy old tenements with blinking casements, such as may be seen in Flanders. Some of these ancient habitations, with high garret gable windows perking into the roofs, have a kind of French shrug about them; and being lopsided with age, appear to hold their heads askew, as if they were grimacing in astonishment at the American improvements ..." But seven years after Dickens' visit, much of the French section was destroyed by fire, and two generations ago, the last house of the French type in St. Louis was pulled down.

— A Guide to the "Show Me" State, 1941

The Guibourd House is a contributing property in the Ste. Genevieve Historic District, which is a National Historic Landmark. The house is operated as a historic house museum by the Foundation for Restoration of Ste. Genevieve, Inc.

== Jacques Jean-René Guibourd de Luzinais ==
- Born: 29 July 1755
- Where: Candé, France
- Father: Christopher Ambroise Guibourd
- Mother: Renée Maguerite Gibault
- Spouse: Ursule (Ursula) Barbeau
  - (Sister-in-Law to Jean-Baptiste Valle)
- Married: 24 June 1800
- Family: (all born in Ste. Genevieve)
  - Eugene Jacques Pierre Guibourd (3 May 1801 – 16 June 1879)
  - Infant Guibourd (died: 21 Nov 1803 [from church burial records])
  - Jean Edward [Eduart] Guibourd (born: unknown) [died: 9 Jan 1805]
  - Omer François Guibourd (born: 23 Oct 1807 - died: October 12, 1874 in La-Corbiere, France)
  - Jules Joseph Marie Guibourd (born: 9 Nov 1811 - died: unknown in France)
- Died: 29 May 1812
- Where: Ste. Genevieve, Missouri
- Buried: Ste. Genevieve Memorial Cemetery

== From Candé to Sainte Genevieve ==
Jacques came to Ste. Genevieve from France by way of Saint Domingue where he had been a secretary to a wealthy plantation owner. During a slave rebellion, he was smuggled out of the country in a cargo barrel by his slave, Moros.

He and Moros made their way back to France whereupon seeing the chaos and destruction there caused by the Reign of Terror (1793–94, just after the French Revolution of 14 July 1789) had decided to leave their homeland. After hearing of a population of French speaking settlers (possibly Royalist (Chouannerie) or those loyal to King Louis XVI) in America from someone headed to Philadelphia, he and Moros decided to sail to America. There is some evidence that Jacques and Moros were shipwrecked during that voyage and that resulted in the two losing all their belongings. It has been noted that when Jacques arrived in Ste. Genevieve, Missouri sometime in the late 1790s, he was penniless.

There is documentation noting that Ursula's father, Jean-Baptiste Barbeau, took in Jacques (and presumably Moros) until he could get settled. This resulted in his meeting his future wife, Ursula in addition to becoming acquainted with Jean-Baptiste Valle, the Commandant of Ste. Genevieve (in the Illinois Territory, Upper Louisiana).

In 1799, he obtained a Spanish land grant for the entire block (2 arpents X 2 arpents, 1 arpent = 192 feet) on which his house currently stands. While the house was being built, Jacques opened a mercantile and sold goods to villagers from his residence just across the street from La Maison de Guibourd. Copies of his merchant's ledger shows what he sold, to whom, how much the items cost and how the items were paid for.

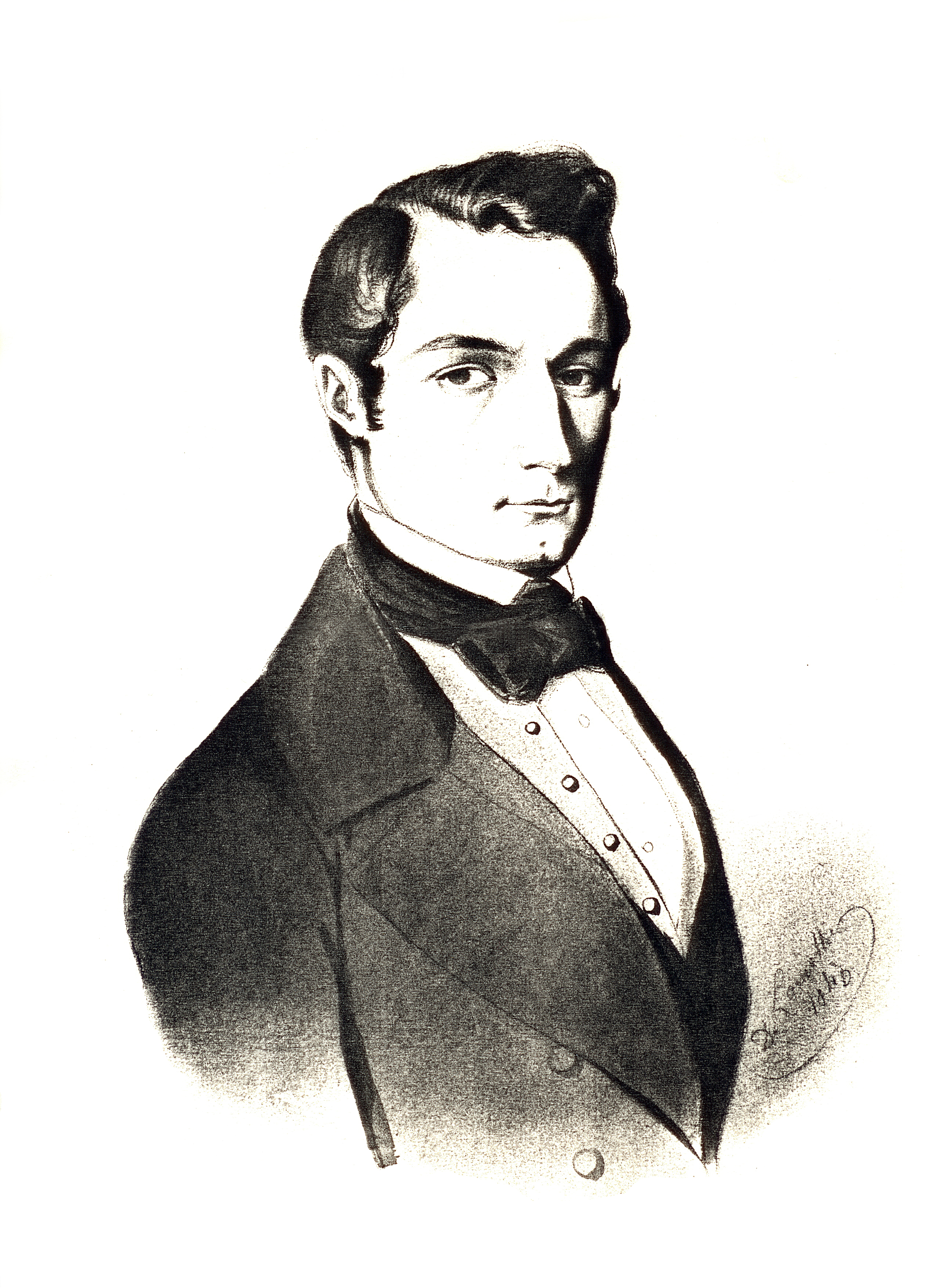
Omer François Guibourd (1807-1854)

In June 1800 he married Ursula Barbeau and quickly became involved in the affairs of the town. He served as a judge on the territorial district court and was a Commissioner of Rates and Levies for the Ste. Genevieve District. He was also one of the original trustees of the 1808 Ste. Genevieve Louisiana Academy, the first institute of higher education west of the Mississippi River.

In addition to being a merchant, Jacques owned a tan-yard (or tannery) just a few miles South of town on the River aux Vases, and owned a lead mine located west of town in what is now Washington County, MO.

Jacques' son, Eugene, married Marie Therese St. Gemme Beauvais and had 12 children most of whom were born in Old Mines, Washington County, MO.

Jacques died 29 May 1812. After Ursula died on October 20, 1843, the south half of the property and the house was inherited by sons Jules and Omer. The northern half was inherited by their son, Eugene who had moved back to Ste. Genevieve just four years earlier in 1839.

At age 11, Eugene's son, Felix, traveled with his uncles, Jules and Omer Guibourd back to Angers, France. There, he obtained his degree in science and art, and attended medical school in Paris. Felix returned to Ste. Genevieve in 1865 where he practiced medicine until his death in 1885.

In 1859 according to the HABS survey, Jules and Omer sold their part of the lot to Eugene and it subsequently became the property of his son, Felix. In 1907, the property was sold to Clovis G. Boyer who in turn sold the house to Jules Felix and Anne Marie Vallé. In January, 1973, Anne Marie's will left the house to the Foundation for Restoration of Ste. Genevieve.

... he had gone to the fatal island of San Domingo [Saint Domingue or Haiti], from which he, like so many other Frenchmen, emerged a victim of the cruel barbarism of the blacks, at that time slaves in revolt. Driven by the horrors of the inhuman rebellion, he set off aboard a ship which Fate provided in his hour of misfortune. In his native land, which he found ablaze with a revolutionary conflagration shortly after he had been welcomed back by his rejoicing family, he found himself faced with the cruel dilemma of either taking up arms against his native country or expatriating himself once more ...

— Omer Guibourd, 1825

== See also ==
- Louisiana (New France)
- Louisiana Purchase
- Illinois Country
- Ohio Country
- New France
- New Spain
- French in the United States
- Timeline of New France history
- Three Flags Day
- A few acres of snow
- French colonization of the Americas
- French colonial empire
- List of North American cities founded in chronological order
- Sainte Geneviève
- List of commandants of the Illinois Country
- Historic regions of the United States
