= Matthew E. Ziegler =

American artist

- Born: February 4, 1897; Ste. Genevieve, Missouri
- Died: October 6, 1981 (aged 84); Ste. Genevieve, Missouri
- Known for: Painter
- Movement: American regionalism

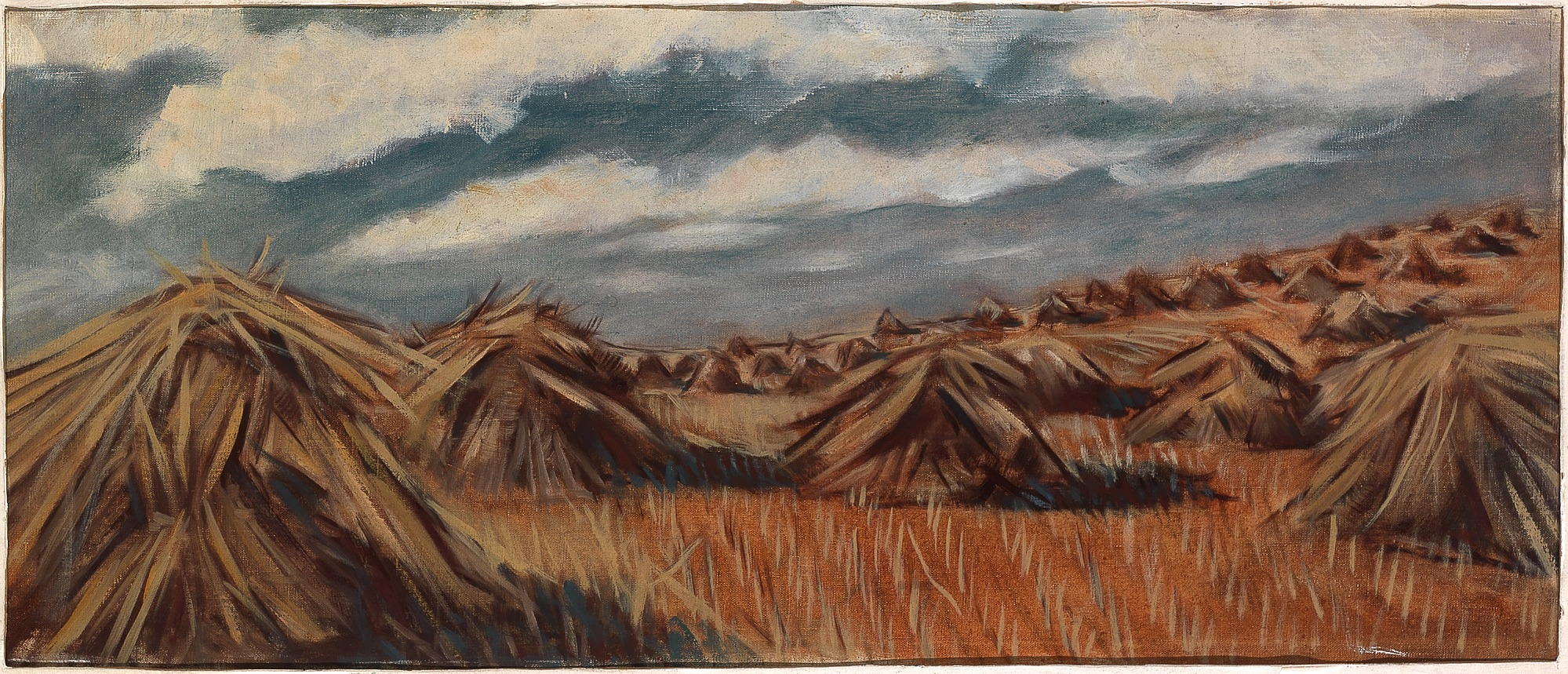
Wheat in the Shock (mural study, Flandreau, South Dakota Post Office)

Matthew E. Ziegler (1897–1981) was an American artist associated with the American regionalist style. He painted the New Deal mural Wheat in the Shock in the Flandreau, South Dakota, post office. It was commissioned by the United States Department of the Treasury.

== Biography ==
Ziegler was born on February 4, 1897, in Ste. Genevieve, Missouri. He was the great grandson of German immigrant Mathias (Matthew) Ziegler, an early German settler and owner of the Green Tree Tavern (Janis-Ziegler House). He was also the nephew of the portrait painter Sister Cassiana Marie, who encouraged him to paint.

In the 1930s, Ziegler was associated with the Ste. Genevieve Art Colony in Ste. Genevieve, Missouri. He owned the rooming house where the three founders of the colony, Aimee Schweig, Bernard E. Peters, and Jessie Beard Rickly, rented space. Ziegler associated with the artists in the colony, particularly Peters, with whom he became friends. Ziegler was interested in photography and used photographs to help compose his paintings, as well as to document rural life in Ste. Genevieve and photographing the colony's artists.

Ziegler won the commission for a mural for the Flandreau, South Dakota Post Office. He produced an oil-on-canvas mural entitled "Wheat in the Shock," which was installed in 1940. The mural was a winner in the 48-State Post Office Mural Competition.

Ziegler died on October 6, 1981, in Ste. Genevieve. His work is in the collection of the Smithsonian American Art Museum.
