= List of United States post office murals in Missouri =

Following is a list of United States post office murals created in Missouri between 1934 and 1943.

Location	Mural title	Image	Artist	Date	Notes	NRHP listed
Bethany	Time Out		Joseph Vorst	1942	oil on canvas	
Canton	Winter Landscape		Jessie Hull Mayer	1940		
Cassville	Flora and Fauna of the Region		H. Edward Winter	1941	three porcelain enameled panels, each signed	
Charleston	Harvest		Joe Jones	1939	oil on canvas	1989
Clinton	Coon Hunt		Richard Haines	1942	oil on canvas	
Columbia	Pony Express		Edward Buk Ulreich	1937	since 2004, mural has been on display at the National Archives Central Plains Region building in Kansas City, MO.	
Columbia	Indians Watching Stagecoach in the Distance		Edward Buk Ulreich	1937	since 2004, mural has been on display at the National Archives Central Plains Region building in Kansas City, MO.	
Dexter	Husking Corn		Joe Jones	1941	oil on canvas	
Eldon	Picnic, Lake of the Ozarks		Frederick Shane	1941		
Fredericktown	The Lead Belt		James B. Turnbull	1939	oil on canvas	2009
Higginsville	Industrial Activity in the City		Jac T. Bowen	1942	trempera	
Jackson	Loading Cattle		James B. Turnbull	1940	Winner of the 48-State Mural Competition; moved to newer building	
Lee's Summit	Pastoral		Ted Gilien	1940	oil on canvas	
Marceline	Contemporary Life in Missouri		Joseph Meert	1938	tempera	
Monett	Products of Missouri		James McCreery	1939		
Mount Vernon	Spring Pastoral		Joseph Meert	1940	oil on canvas	
Palmyra	Memories of Marion County		James Penny (artist)	1939	oil on canvas; depicts Tom Sawyer, Huck Finn and Jim	
Paris	The Clemens Family Arrives in Monroe County		Fred G. Carpenter	1940	oil on canvas	
Pleasant Hill	Back Home, April 1865		Thomas C. Lea III	1939	oil on canvas	
Ste. Genevieve	La Guignolee		Martyl Schweig	1942	oil on canvas	
St. Joseph	History of the Region—Settlers Crossing the River		Gustaf Dalstrom	1941		
St. Joseph	History of the Region—First Railway Post Office		Gustaf Dalstrom	1941		
St. Joseph	History of the Region—Flooded River		Gustaf Dalstrom	1941		
St. Joseph	History of the Region—Grain Farmers		Gustaf Dalstrom	1941		
St. Joseph	History of the Region—Horseless Carriage		Gustaf Dalstrom	1941		
St. Joseph	History of the Region—Indian Boat Race		Gustaf Dalstrom	1941		
St. Joseph	History of the Region—Leading Packet Boat		Gustaf Dalstrom	1941		
St. Joseph	History of the Region—Lewis & Clark Expedition		Gustaf Dalstrom	1941		
St. Joseph	History of the Region—Negro River Music		Gustaf Dalstrom	1941		
St. Joseph	History of the Region—Pony Express		Gustaf Dalstrom	1941		
St. Joseph	History of the Region—Railway Station of 1880		Gustaf Dalstrom	1941		
St. Joseph	History of the Region—Robidaux House		Gustaf Dalstrom	1941		
St. Louis Gwen B. Stiles Station	Old Levee and Market at St Louis		Lumen Martin Winter	1939	oil on canvas	
St. Louis Main Post Office	The Postwar Period		Mitchell Siporin	1942	Largest single project awarded for a post office by the Section	
St. Louis Main Post Office	The Territory of Missouri		Mitchell Siporin	1942		
St. Louis Main Post Office	George Rogers Clark and Daniel Boone		Mitchell Siporin	1942		
St. Louis Main Post Office	The Civil War		Mitchell Siporin	1942		
St. Louis Main Post Office	Discovery and Colonization		Mitchell Siporin	1942		
St. Louis Main Post Office	Commerce and Trade		Edward Millman	1942		
St. Louis Main Post Office	Pre-Civil War Missouri		Edward Millman	1942		
St. Louis Main Post Office	The Struggle for Statehood		Edward Millman	1942		
St. Louis Main Post Office	The River		Edward Millman	1942		
Sullivan	Saturday Afternoon on Main Street		Lawrence Adams	1942	oil on canvas	
Union	Aspects of Rural Missouri		James Penny (artist)	1941	fresco was restored and moved to a new post office building	
University City	The Louisiana Purchase Exposition		Trew Hocker	1940		
Windsor	Agriculture and Varied Institutes		H. Louis Freund	1938	oil on canvas	
