= Schweig =

Schweig is a surname. Notable people with the surname include:

- Aimee Schweig (1897–1987), American artist
- Eric Schweig (born 1967), Canadian actor
- Graham Schweig (born 1953), American author and scholar
- Shmuel Joseph Schweig (1905–1984), Israeli photographer
