= List of murals in Kansas City, Missouri =

Public murals in Kansas City, Missouri

This list of murals in Kansas City, Missouri documents outdoor murals painted on buildings, walls, other structures and streets in Kansas City, Missouri. It includes historical works and grouped mural projects. Works in Kansas City, Kansas and North Kansas City are outside its scope.

Kansas City's murals include neighborhood commissions, sports-themed paintings and works produced through mural festivals. The tables are a selection of documented works, rather than a census of murals currently surviving in the city.

== Background ==
Murals in Kansas City depict subjects including local history, sports and civic identity. The Kansas City Royals' Raised Royal campaign began in 2017. The SpraySeeMO festival has commissioned works in several neighborhoods; its 2024 edition was reported to have produced 20 murals. The Northeast Kansas City Chamber of Commerce's 2026 mural-tour map identifies 43 locations containing 52 murals within its tour area.

Murals in Kansas City have been restored, obscured or lost when their supporting structures changed. Restoration of Lewis and Clark 1804, painted in 2004, was documented in 2021. Construction of the Two Light apartment tower obscured one of Alexander Austin's earlier Power & Light District murals and prompted a new commission in 2017.

== Wall and structural murals ==
Names without a published formal title are descriptive identifiers. "Not stated" means that the cited documentation does not establish an installation date. Dates explicitly labeled "documented" identify publication evidence rather than installation years. An entry's inclusion does not establish its present condition. Grouped projects and recurring artist/site records are identified in the notes.

Image	Name or descriptive identifier	Artist(s) or credited participants	Year or documented date	Location	Notes	References
	Lewis and Clark 1804	José Faus; Alisha Gambino; Jesus Ortiz	2004	115 W 5th St; River Market Antiques	Restoration documented in 2021.	
	Key Detail mural	Key Detail	2024	122 W 5th St		
	Osiris Rain mural	Osiris Rain	2024	The Farmhouse, 300 Delaware St		
	Alex Senna mural	Alex Senna	2024	310 E 5th St, alley		
	Two Light mural	Alexander Austin; Selbert Perkins Design	2017	Two Light apartment tower, Power & Light District	Design collaboration; separate from Austin's earlier Power & Light District murals.	
	#KCLoves	Paul Corrigan (design direction); Cara Berberet (hand lettering)	Not stated	1720 Main St, garage viewpoint	The address identifies a published viewing location on a parking garage.	
	Chiefs Kingdom at Tom's Town	Phil "Sike Style" Shafer	Not stated	1701 Main St		
	Raised Royal No. 5	Lance Flores	2017	1523 Oak St	Part of the Raised Royal campaign.	
	Kansas City, I'm So In Love	Ruthie Ozonoff	Not stated	2010 McGee St		
	Love Kansas City	Donald "Scribe" Ross	Not stated	421 Southwest Blvd		
	Raised Royal No. 3	Donald "Scribe" Ross	2017	421 Southwest Blvd	Part of the Raised Royal campaign.	
	Kiptoe mural	Kiptoe	2024	1519 Oak St		
	123Klan mural	123Klan	2024	412 Oak St		
	Emily Ding mural	Emily Ding	2024	412 Oak St, rear	Rear of the building.	
	Rif Raf Giraffe; Phybr mural	Rif Raf Giraffe; Phybr	2024	DoubleTap, 310 Oak St	Collaboration.	
	Cathedral in the Wind	Thomas Woodward LaFavre	2024	310 Oak St, alley entrance		
	JEKS mural	JEKS	2024	Crossfit on 18th	Venue identified in the festival record.	
	MadMan mural	MadMan	2024	516 Grand	Year identifies the festival edition.	
	Merk Aveli mural	Merk Aveli	2024	1632 Broadway	Separate organizer credit from Cherish Yourself at the same address.	
	Cherish Yourself	Sebastian Coolidge	2024	1632 Broadway	Separate organizer credit from Merk Aveli at the same address.	
	Farid Rueda mural	Farid Rueda	2024	705 Virginia Ave		
	Queen Andrea mural	Queen Andrea	2024	2010 E 18th St		
	Femme9 mural	Femme9	2025	2010 E 18th St	SpraySeeMO, May edition.	
	Matt Gondek mural	Matt Gondek	2025	1731 Locust St		
	Ill.Des mural	Ill.Des	2025	1222 McGee St		
	Osiris Rain mural	Osiris Rain	2025	1301 Oak St		
	JC Rivera; Anna Vertii mural	JC Rivera; Anna Vertii	2025	1529 Grand Blvd		
	Kendall Rose mural	Kendall Rose	2025	1814 Oak St		
	Kiptoe mural	Kiptoe	2025	1701 Brooklyn Ave		
	Buck O'Neil / Kansas City Monarchs murals	Alexander Austin	Not stated	Paseo YMCA / Buck O'Neil tribute area; 1832 The Paseo in magazine listing	Grouped entry for murals depicting Buck O'Neil and the Kansas City Monarchs.	
	West Bottoms Garden Wall	Evolution 816	2023	1309 W 9th St		
	Raised Royal No. 1	Phil "Sike Style" Shafer	2017	Southwest Blvd and 25th St	Part of the Raised Royal campaign.	
	The Maker	Grace Cantril (design); Rif Raf Giraffe and participating makers	Not stated	2601 Madison Ave		
	A.L. Grime mural	A.L. Grime	2025	1107 Hickory St		
	Eye Cough mural	Eye Cough	2025	1105 Hickory St		
	Anna Charney mural	Anna Charney	2025	2918 Southwest Blvd		
	Sheep Chen mural	Sheep Chen	2025	3030 Roanoke Rd		
	Raised Royal at Sweet Siam	Carpenter Collective	2017	4130 Pennsylvania Ave	Part of the Raised Royal campaign.	
	Westport Ale House Chiefs mural	Phil "Sike Style" Shafer	Not stated	4128 Broadway Blvd		
	Mujer	Rodrigo Alvarez; Isaac Tapia	Not stated	Café Corazón, 1721 Westport Rd		
	Gaia mural	Gaia	2024	114 Linwood Blvd	Year identifies the festival edition.	
	Caratoes mural	Caratoes	2025	3732 Main St		
	HoxxoH mural	HoxxoH	2025	3967 Main St		
	Rif Raf Giraffe mural	Rif Raf Giraffe	2025	510 E 28th St	Separate organizer credit from Mr. B Baby at the same address.	
	Mr. B Baby mural	Mr. B Baby	2025	510 E 28th St	Separate organizer credit from Rif Raf Giraffe at the same address.	
	Crafted in Kansas City	Chris Foxworth	Not stated	2626 Guinotte Ave		
	Kids Being Kids	Emily Alvarez	Not stated	4815 Independence Ave	Express Stop panel.	
	Bailar	Phyllis Hernandez	Not stated	4815 Independence Ave	Express Stop panel.	
	Happy Pareidolia	Zachary Laman	Not stated	4815 Independence Ave	Express Stop panel.	
	Rooted in Life	Madison Sanchez-Martin	Not stated	4815 Independence Ave	Express Stop panel.	
	Hero	Isaac Tapia	Not stated	4815 Independence Ave	Express Stop panel.	
	Fable, Fact, & Fantasy	Fai Beal; Global FC Youth	Not stated	4815 Independence Ave	Express Stop panel.	
	Town of Kansas 1850	José Faus; Alisha Gambino; Jesus Ortiz	Not stated	3rd and Wyandotte streets	1850 is part of the title, not the installation date.	
Colorful grid of portraits in the drag-history mural at Passions KC	If life's a drag, Kansas City's been living	Jared Horman	2026	Passions KC, 208 Westport Rd	Drag-history mural; debuted in June 2026.	
	Chappell Roan mural	Jared Horman; Christine Riutzel	2025	Valentine Apartments, 3724 Broadway Blvd	Collaborative portrait of Chappell Roan.	
World AIDS Day mural with lettering and stylized figures at KC CARE Health Center	World AIDS Day mural (Stigma = Hate)	Jared Horman	2020	KC CARE Health Center, 3515 Broadway	Commissioned by the AIDS Service Foundation for World AIDS Day.	
	Black music mural	Phil "Sike Style" Shafer; J.T. Daniels	2026	2000 Vine		
	Breach	Hector Casanova; Kansas City Art Institute	2016	Grove Park pool, 1500 Benton		
	Patriotic mural	Dianne Dickerson; community participants	2001	9th and Hardesty streets, railroad underpass	Refreshed in 2003.	
	Plant Milkweed, Save the Monarchs	Celina Curry; Andy Ozier	2022	2601 Independence Ave		
	Monarch / Butterfly mural	Zac Laman; Bethany Joy Elliott	2021	5100 Independence Ave, Independence and Quincy	Also described as the Butterfly mural; unveiled in October 2021.	
	Alex Senna mural at Manny's	Alex Senna	2018; also documented 2024	Manny's Mexican Restaurant	Artist and venue occur in both festival records; whether these refer to separate walls, a replacement or a restoration is unresolved.	
	DISTORT mural	DISTORT	2024	Green Dirt on Oak		
	Registered Artist mural	Registered Artist	2024	Wellness Warehouse		
	Ancestral Fox	Sabertooth Thomas	2024	Vulpes Bastille		
	Dirt Cobain mural	Dirt Cobain	2025	3030 Roanoke Rd	SpraySeeMO, October edition.	
	Eric Skotnes; Angie Navarro mural	Eric Skotnes; Angie Navarro	2025	2000 Broadway	SpraySeeMO, October edition.	
	Elle Street Art mural	Elle Street Art	2025	131 E 39th St	SpraySeeMO, October edition.	
	CHNK Fondue mural	CHNK Fondue	2025	131 E 39th St	SpraySeeMO, October edition.	
	Ms. Yellow mural	Ms. Yellow	2025	Muni, River Market	SpraySeeMO, October edition.	
	Skela mural	Skela	2025	Concentra Alley, Crossroads	SpraySeeMO, October edition.	
	Osiris Rain mural	Osiris Rain	2025	Nature's Own Alley, River Market	SpraySeeMO, October edition.	
	Ivan Roque mural	Ivan Roque	2025	1814 Oak St	SpraySeeMO, October edition.	
	Registered Artist mural	Registered Artist	2025	Kenton Bros Security, E Truman Rd	SpraySeeMO, October edition.	
	Compost Pile mural	Compost Pile	2025	1809 Baltimore	SpraySeeMO, October edition.	
	Dustin Spagnola mural	Dustin Spagnola	2025	Nature's Own Alley, River Market	SpraySeeMO, October edition.	
	Mr. B Baby mural	Mr. B Baby	2026	1100 Santa Fe St		
	JEKS mural	JEKS	2026	1100 Santa Fe St		
	Caratoes mural	Caratoes	2026	1100 Santa Fe St		
	CHUE mural	CHUE	2026	1209 Union Ave		
	Rif Raf Giraffe mural	Rif Raf Giraffe	2026	1209 Union Ave		
	Phybr mural	Phybr	2026	1209 Union Ave		
	Femme9 mural	Femme9	2026	1209 Union Ave		
	Ghostbeard; Gondek mural	Ghostbeard; Gondek	2020	Mano's Wine, 1919 Cherry		
	JC Rivera mural	JC Rivera	2020	Mano's Wine, 1919 Cherry		
	Ten Hundred mural	Ten Hundred	2020	Rosemann & Associates, 1526 Grand		
	Rif Raf Giraffe; Sebastian Coolidge mural	Rif Raf Giraffe; Sebastian Coolidge	2020	Royal Liquors, 801 Southwest Blvd		
	Allison Bamcat; (Sub)Urban Warrior mural	Allison Bamcat; (Sub)Urban Warrior	2020	After Action Network, 2401 Summit St		
	Key Detail mural	Key Detail	2020	Mano's Wine, 1919 Cherry		
	Erye mural	Erye	2020	Mano's Wine, 1919 Cherry		
	MadMan mural	MadMan	2020	Depth Security, 2131 Washington St		
	Scott Tarbox mural	Scott Tarbox	2020	After Action Network, 2401 Summit St		
	Skela mural	Skela	2020	Mano's Wine, 1919 Cherry		
	Sabertooth Thomas mural	Sabertooth Thomas	2020	Casual Animal, 1725 McGee St		
	Phybr mural	Phybr	2020	Mano's Wine, 1919 Cherry		
	Alex Eickhoff mural	Alex Eickhoff	2020	Mano's Wine, 1919 Cherry		
	They Drift; KSRA mural	They Drift; KSRA	2020	Bic Media alley, 2130 Washington St		
	Dustin Spagnola mural	Dustin Spagnola	2020	Bic Media alley, 2130 Washington St		
	Spaceship Zulu; Zac Laman mural	Spaceship Zulu; Zac Laman	2020	Deluxe Lighting & Electric, 824 Woodsweather Rd		
	Key Detail mural	Key Detail	2019	The Roasterie, 1213 W 27th Terrace		
	Dside mural	Dside	2019	Mano's Wine, 1919 Cherry		
	Arsek & Erase mural	Arsek & Erase	2019	Strange Days Brewing, 316 Oak St		
	Lauren YS mural	Lauren YS	2019	Mano's Wine, 1919 Cherry		
	123Klan mural	123Klan	2019	Artist & Craftsman, 229 Southwest Blvd		
	Matt Gondek mural	Matt Gondek	2019	After Action Network, 2401 Summit St		
	Patch Whisky; Ghost Beard mural	Patch Whisky; Ghost Beard	2019	8 E 31st St		
	Sebastian Coolidge mural	Sebastian Coolidge	2019	1722 W 39th St		
	Allison Bamcat mural	Allison Bamcat	2019	911 W 44th St		
	MadMan mural	MadMan	2019	Generator Studio, 1615 Baltimore		
	Jason Jones mural	Jason Jones	2019	917 W 44th St		
	Jake Merten mural	Jake Merten	2019	Mano's Wine, 1919 Cherry		
	(Sub)Urban Warrior mural	(Sub)Urban Warrior	2019	Mano's Wine, 1919 Cherry		
	Mosher Show mural	Mosher Show	2019	1700 Locust		
	Skela mural	Skela	2019	After Action Network, 2401 Summit St		
	Ten Hundred mural	Ten Hundred	2019	Atomic Design, 706 E 19th St		
	Emily Ding mural	Emily Ding	2019	Lutfi's Fried Fish, 3037 Main St		
	Samuel Hale mural	Samuel Hale	2019	After Action Network, 2401 Summit St		
	Dustin Spagnola mural	Dustin Spagnola	2019	After Action Network, 2401 Summit St		
	Zulu Painter mural	Zulu Painter	2019	Outreach International, 112 W 18th St		
	Ten Hundred mural	Ten Hundred	2017	1919 Cherry		
	MadMan mural	MadMan	2017	1625 Oak		
	Registered Artist mural	Registered Artist	2017	504 E 18th St		
	Three Strong Women	Zac Laman	Not stated	2659 Independence Ave		
	Three Roosters	Zac Laman	Not stated	2659 Independence Ave		
	Come to the Table	Emily Alvarez	Not stated	2620 Independence Ave		
	Welcome Northeast	Celina Curry; Andy Ozier	Not stated	2601 Independence Ave		
	Woodland School retaining-wall mural	José Faus	Not stated	711 Woodland Ave		
	Saxophone player mural	JT Daniels	Not stated	1616 E 18th St		
	The Call mural	Alexander Austin	Not stated	1715 E 18th St		
	Stone Lion Puppets Theatre mural	John Morrell	Not stated	2406 E Truman Rd		
	Fall of the Artic King	Ivan J Roque	Not stated	3401 E Truman Rd	Title transcribed as "Artic" in the cited tour map.	
	Traditional Classic	Alexander Austin	Not stated	2309-A E 12th St		
	Eastern Wind	Michelle Renn	Not stated	5300 Independence Ave		
	The Narrow Way	Kye Benjamine Stone	Not stated	3500 Independence Ave		
	Set Free	Become More	Not stated	3420 Independence Ave		
	Untitled	Zachary Laman	Not stated	302 Gladstone Blvd, on Anderson Ave		
	Jar of Hope	Isaac Tapia; Rodrigo Alvarez	Not stated	2203 Lexington Ave		
	Power of Education	Socorro Ramirez	Not stated	2301 Lexington Ave		
	Scarritt School mural	Hector Casanova; Kansas City Art Institute	Not stated	3509 Anderson Ave		
Let Kids Play mural with colorful sports imagery and pronoun panels at Gaels	Let Kids Play mural	Jared Horman	2021	Gaels Public House & Sports, 5424 Troost Ave	Dated 2021 in the artist's portfolio; photographed in a June 2023 profile.	
	Jared Horman mural, Liberty Courtyard Phase 2	Jared Horman	Not stated	Liberty Courtyard, 14th and Hickory streets, beneath I-670	Phase 2 artist/site entry; individual title and exact support panel are not specified.	
	Chico Sierra mural, Liberty Courtyard Phase 2	Chico Sierra	Not stated	Liberty Courtyard, 14th and Hickory streets, beneath I-670	Phase 2 artist/site entry; individual title and exact support panel are not specified.	
	Femme9 mural, Liberty Courtyard Phase 2	Femme9	Not stated	Liberty Courtyard, 14th and Hickory streets, beneath I-670	Phase 2 artist/site entry; individual title and exact support panel are not specified.	
	DINKC mural, Liberty Courtyard Phase 2	DINKC	Not stated	Liberty Courtyard, 14th and Hickory streets, beneath I-670	Phase 2 artist/site entry; individual title and exact support panel are not specified.	
	Liberty Courtyard Phase 1 mural group	Evolution 816 (Ben Watson; Mike Judd); Scribe; Vania Soto; Visual Goodies	Not stated	Liberty Courtyard, 14th and Hickory streets, beneath I-670	Grouped phase credit, not a count of individual murals.	
	Liberty Courtyard Phase 3 mural group	JT Daniels; Felicia Koloc; ITRA Icons; Doodle Dood; Katie Brown	Not stated	Liberty Courtyard, 14th and Hickory streets, beneath I-670	Grouped phase credit; the source's narrative and named roster do not establish an individual mural count.	
	Liberty Courtyard naming mural	EVOLUTION	May 2024	Liberty Courtyard, 14th and Hickory streets, overhead I-670 viaduct	Naming mural on the overhead viaduct, distinct from the paintings on supports below.	
	Plaza Building Phase 1 mural group	Anna Charney; JT Daniels; Kendall Rose; Octavio Logo; Scribe; Tiger Sasha	2020 (project began)	4620 Mill Creek Parkway	Grouped west- and south-wall project; the source's artist count and roster differ.	
	Plaza Building Phase 2 mural group	Anna Charney; Evolution 816 (Ben Watson; Mike Judd); Detour; Eyez; ITRA Icons (Isaac Tapia; Rodrigo Alvarez); Jessica Carpenter; Kendall Rose; Meg Wagler; Tad Carpenter	Not stated; after Phase 1	4620 Mill Creek Parkway, south wall	Grouped south-wall project; the source's artist count and roster differ.	
	Emily Ding mural, Plaza Building Phase 3	Emily Ding	Not stated	4620 Mill Creek Parkway, west wall	Individual west-wall contribution to Phase 3.	
	KC Water service-building mural	Donald "Scribe" Ross	Not stated	KC Water Department Service Building, E 18th St and Prospect Ave	One composition spanning two walls.	
	Q Kansas City exterior quotation mural	Miles Crowley	Documented in 2024 and 2025	Q Kansas City, 504 Westport Road	Exterior quotation mural; quotation credited to Kalen Dion.	
	Welcome to Berkley Riverfront Park container mural	Dani Roma; Tony Sanderford	2026	Berkley Riverfront Park, shipping container	One project covering four sides of a shipping container; KCTV5 spells the first artist's name Dani Romay.	

== Street murals ==
In September 2020, artists and volunteers completed six Black Lives Matter street murals at locations across Kansas City.

Image	Name or descriptive identifier	Artist(s) or credited participants	Year or documented date	Location	Notes	References
	Black Lives Matter street mural	Harold Smith	2020	Briarcliff Parkway and N Mulberry Drive	Completed in September 2020.	
	Black Lives Matter street mural	Not individually credited in the cited report	2020	Baltimore Ave and 10th St	Completed in September 2020.	
	Black Lives Matter street mural	Not individually credited in the cited report	2020	18th and Vine streets	Completed in September 2020.	
	Black Lives Matter street mural	Not individually credited in the cited report	2020	Troost Ave and 31st St	Completed in September 2020.	
	Black Lives Matter street mural	Not individually credited in the cited report	2020	Brookside Blvd and 63rd St	Completed in September 2020.	
	Black Lives Matter street mural	Warren Harvey	2020	Meyer Blvd and Troost Ave	Completed in September 2020.	

== Former murals ==
Image	Name or descriptive identifier	Artist(s) or credited participants	Year or documented date	Location	Notes	References
	House of Cards	Community participants; Rebecca Koop (organizing catalyst)	2011	7th Street and Indiana Ave	The building partially collapsed in 2015 and had been removed by January 2021; the exact demolition date is not stated.	

== Multi-mural sites and programs ==
These entries describe programs or locations containing multiple works; they are not additional individual murals.

Site or program	Location	Description	References
Art Alley	512 E 18th St	Mural corridor.	
MO River Murals Fest	Riverfront levee-wall and trail corridor	Riverfront mural project documented in 2026.	
Historic Northeast mural tour	Historic Northeast and connected corridors	The 2026 institutional map identifies 43 locations and 52 murals.	
Liberty Courtyard mural program	14th and Hickory streets, beneath I-670	Multi-phase program, including murals on viaduct supports and a separate overhead naming mural.	
Plaza Building mural program	4620 Mill Creek Parkway	Multi-phase wall-mural project. Group credits and Emily Ding's individual contribution are listed above.	

== See also ==
- Public art
- Street art
- List of United States post office murals in Missouri
