= Sister Cassiana Marie =

Painter (1883–1944)

Cassiana Marie Vogt (1883 – June 21, 1944), born Martha Vogt and best known as Sister Cassiana Marie, was a Catholic nun and oil painter who was a member of the Ste. Genevieve Art Colony.

== Biography ==
Martha Vogt, known affectionately as Mattie, was born in 1883 in Ste. Genevieve, Missouri. She joined the Sisters of St. Joseph of Carondelet at age 19, changing her name to Sister Cassiana Marie Vogt and taking her final vows as a nun in 1910.

Sister Cassiana Marie was active as an oil painter. She studied drawing and painting at the Art Institute of Chicago in 1919.

Despite her austere appearance as a Catholic nun, she was a free thinker and sought further opportunities to pursue her art as a member of the well-known Ste. Genevieve Art Colony in her hometown. She "discreetly" taught and painted there for multiple summers in the 1930s. This experience exposed her to progressive ideas and gave her a freedom she enjoyed greatly. The colony was notable for its acceptance of female artists such as Sister Cassiana and Miriam McKinnie.

Sister Cassiana Marie has been described as "an intensely serious artist" who viewed art as opening one's eyes to a natural world where "beauty was supreme to dogma." Her work was in a more classical style than some of her peers at the Ste. Genevieve Art Colony. In addition to still lives, she painted various portraits, including of Catholic leaders and prominent local figures such as Green Bay Mayor John V. Diener and opera singer Lucille Meusel. She also produced multiple murals, most notably her 1938 life-size mural for the Sisters of St. Joseph of Cardondelet Convent in St. Louis.

She was a significant influence on her nephew Matthew E. Ziegler, whom she encouraged to pursue painting. She taught art at the St. Joseph Academy, a Catholic high school in Green Bay, Wisconsin, in 1913–1915 and 1921–1942. She also taught for a period at Rosati-Kain High School in St. Louis.

Sister Cassiana Marie died in 1944 in Richmond Heights, Missouri. After her death, a large group of her paintings were acquired for the permanent collection of the Neville Public Museum of Brown County. Her work has been exhibited there, including in a 1999 solo show titled "Heavenly Guidance," and at other institutions across the Midwest in the decades since.
