= Bill Sentner =

American trade unionist (1907–1958

- Born: William Sentner; 1907; St. Louis
- Died: 1958; St. Louis
- Occupation: Trade Unionist
- Employer(s): United Electrical, Radio and Machine Workers of America
- Political party: United Electrical, Radio and Machine Workers of America

William Sentner (1907–1958) was an American trade unionist and Communist Party organizer in St. Louis, Missouri.

== Early life and education ==
Sentner was born in 1907 in St. Louis to Russian Jewish immigrant parents. His father helped organize the first St. Louis local for International Ladies Garment Workers Union in 1909. Sentner would later tell stories of being paid to throw stones in factory strikes as a child. He attended Washington University in St. Louis on scholarship studying architecture until 1927, when his father's death forced him to move in pursuit of work. He worked on merchant ships traveling to Europe and the Middle East, and continued studying architecture as well as Marxism before returning to St. Louis in 1932.

== Labor organizing ==
When Sentner returned to St. Louis, he joined the local John Reed Club, alongside Jack Conroy and Joe Jones, and the Communist Party USA Unemployed Council. He organized in the Hooverville areas on the riverfront, Hyde Park and near Busch Brewery, as well as Mill Creek Valley. Working with Trade Union Unity League under Ralph Shaw, Sentner assisted the 1933 Funsten Nut strike and participated in negotiations, arguing with the mayor that the workers' demands were a municipal concern as their low pay made them reliant on public assistance. He was arrested during the strike, and emerged as a leading figure in the local labor scene.

Sentner organized for United Electrical, Radio and Machine Workers of America. While working with the Steel Workers Organizing Committee, Sentner was contacted by Bob Manewitz at Emerson Electric for help organizing the 1937 sitdown strike, which lasted 53 days and resolved with a new contract and improved wages. In August 1937, he was elected president of Congress of Industrial Organizations District 8 with the philosophy "human rights above property rights" and a vision to build toward industrial democracy.

As a leader in the labor movement, Sentner advocated for the inclusion of women and African American workers despite the persistent racist attitudes of white workers who formed the core of the industrial unions. He encouraged the union of Wagner Electric to appoint two Black workers to the executive board, including Lee Henry, who organized 99% of the Black workers into the union by 1942 and became the first Black organizer in the national union. Sentner was also instrumental in establishing a Race Relations Commission in St. Louis City and advocated against measures to reduce employment opportunities for Black and women workers back to pre-war conditions.

As weapons production declined near the end of World War 2, manufacturing jobs were reduced and Sentner was joined a group called the Serious Thinkers Club focused on strengthening St. Louis's economic base. The group included CEO of Emerson Electric Stuart Symington, the CEO of Monsanto Chemical Co., and other local leaders. Sentner advocated for a Missouri Valley Authority public works program, but instead secured union jobs for the 1944 Pick–Sloan Missouri Basin Program, which flooded the lands of Lakota and Dakota reservations. Historian Walter Johnson described this period of "postwar 'bargains'" as a subordination of radical elements in the union movement and ensuing Taft–Hartley Act as a "counterrevolution of property." Sentner lost the re-election to his leadership role in 1949.

Sentner served as nonresident board member of Commonwealth College until it was shut down by the state of Arkansas in 1941. He died from heart failure in 1958.

=== Relationship to the Communist Party ===
Sentner was often noted as an "open Communist" and told Fortune in his 1943 profile that he never hid his party affiliations. He was noted by his wife and ex-members of the party for not always following party line, often choosing union interests over party leadership dictates. Sentner asked for the election of UE District 8 leadership to be conducted by local referendum ballot, rather than district convention, as a demonstration of direct democracy.

In 1939, Sentner was convicted for criminal syndicalism for his work in the Iowa Maytag sitdown strike. Other union leadership and civil defense organizations failed to support him due to pressures to disassociate from communism. Following the 1941 overturn of the case by the Iowa Supreme Court, UE leadership pressured him to resign from the party to further the work of the union. He subsequently renewed his membership in 1942.

In 1952, Sentner was among the Communist Party members prosecuted in the Smith Act trials of Communist Party leaders, and his wife Toni was prosecuted under the McCarran Internal Security Act. Carl Marzani made his final documentary film, The Sentner Story, about the prosecutions of the Sentners in 1953.
