= Ste. Genevieve Art Colony =

American art colony

- Formation: 1932
- Dissolved: 1941; 85 years ago
- Purpose: private art academy
- Location: Ste. Genevieve, Missouri

The Ste. Genevieve Art Colony was an art collective in Ste. Genevieve, Missouri. It was founded in 1932 by Aimee Schweig, Bernard E. Peters, and Jessie Beard Rickly. The Ste. Genevieve Summer School of Art was established in 1934. The colony was modeled on its most recent predecessor, the Provincetown Art Colony in Provincetown, Massachusetts, as well as The Shinnecock Hills Summer School of Art on Long Island, New York, the New Hope School in Pennsylvania, and the Taos art colony in New Mexico. The location of Ste. Genevieve contained rural vistas and genre scenes yet was close to the metropolitan Saint Louis area.

The group expanded to include other Saint Louis artists including Frank Nuderscher, Joe Jones, and Thomas Hart Benton. The colony attracted many Midwestern artists with the styles of painting including American regionalism, Social realism, plein air and the new Abstract art.

The colony dissolved in 1941.

== Associated artists ==
Artists closely associated with the colony include:

- Thomas Hart Benton
- Sister Cassiana Marie
- Frederick Conway
- Joe Jones
- Martyl Schweig Langsdorf
- Joseph Meert
- Miriam McKinnie
- Bernard E. Peters
- Jessie Beard Rickly
- Aimee Schweig
- E. Oscar Thalinger
- Joseph Vorst
- Matthew E. Ziegler

== Legacy ==
In 2004 a study of the colony entitled An American art colony : the art and artists of Ste. Genevieve, Missouri, 1930-1940 was published. In 2011 the Museum of Art and Archaeology in Columbia, Missouri held a retrospective exhibition entitled A Midwestern View: The Artists of the Ste. Genevieve Art Colony.
