= E. Oscar Thalinger =

American artist

- Born: March 20, 1885; Riquewihr, Alsace-Lorraine, France
- Died: June 6, 1965 (aged 80); Saint Louis, Missouri
- Known for: Painter
- Movement: American regionalism

E. Oscar Thalinger (1885-1965) was an American artist originally associated with the American regionalist style. In his later career, he painted in an abstract style.

== Biography ==
Thalinger was born on March 20, 1885, in Riquewihr, Alsace-Lorraine, France. His family emigrated to the United States where he studied at the St. Louis School of Fine Arts. Thalinger worked as the registrar for the Saint Louis Art Museum from 1913 through 1952.

In the 1930s he was associated with the Ste. Genevieve Art Colony in Ste. Genevieve, Missouri. He taught painting at the art colony's summer school. He also assisted Thomas Hart Benton with his classes at the colony. Thalinger served as a director of the summer school in 1936 and 1937. In 1933 Thalinger was included in the exhibition Painting and Sculpture from 16 American Cities at The Museum of Modern Art. Later in his career Thalinger incorporated a more abstract style to his art.

Thalinger died on June 6, 1965, in Saint Louis.

His work is in the collection of the Saint Louis Art Museum.
