= Anthony United States Post Office =

- US Post Office—Anthony
- U.S. National Register of Historic Places
- The Anthony United States Post Office in 2026

- Location within Kansas Location within the United States
- Location: 121 W. Steadman, Anthony, Kansas
- Coordinates: 37°09′14″N 98°01′08″W
- Area: Less than one acre
- Built: 1939
- Architect: Louis Simon
- Architectural style: Classical Revival
- MPS: Kansas Post Offices with Artwork, 1936–1942 MPS
- NRHP reference No.: 89001631
- Added to NRHP: October 17, 1989

The Anthony United States Post Office, listed on the National Register of Historic Places as US Post Office—Anthony, is located at 121 W. Steadman in Anthony, Kansas. It was built in 1939. It was listed on the National Register in 1989.

It was deemed significant "for its historical association with the Treasury Department's Section program and for the artistic significance of the mural that it contains. The mural, Turning a Corner, was painted by St. Louis artist Joe Jones (1901–1963) in 1939 and depicts three farmers using a combine to thresh wheat.
