= 1933 Funsten Nut strike =

1933 labor strike in Greater St. Louis

- Date: May 15–24, 1933 (9 days)
- Location: Greater St. Louis, United States (Note: Factories affected in the strike were located in St. Louis, Missouri, and East St. Louis, Illinois.)
- Caused by: Poor working conditions and low pay
- Goals: Union recognition; Equal pay for black and white workers; Increased piece work pay scale
- Methods: Picketing; Strike action; Walkout
- Result: Strike ended after agreement from management to raise wages; the company later broke the union through downsizing, mechanization, and relocations

Parties
Food Workers Industrial Union	R. E. Funsten Company (Note: The company's name is given in various sources as either the "R. E. Funsten Company" or the "Funsten Nut Company".); Central Pecan Company; Liberty Nut Company

Workers for the R. E. Funsten Company, a pecan-processing corporation based in St. Louis, Missouri, United States, held a labor strike from May 15 to May 24, 1933. The workers, consisting largely of black women employed at facilities in both St. Louis and nearby East St. Louis, Illinois, were organized by the Food Workers Industrial Union and were demanding union recognition, an increase in pay, and equal pay for both African American and white American workers. The strike ended in success for the strikers, but within a few years, the union had been crushed by the company.

St. Louis had historically been a center for pecan-processing, and in the 1930s, the industry employed about 3,000 people, overwhelmingly black women. Most worked in nut-picking, the process of removing the edible nut from the shells. At Funsten, the largest employer, the black workers earned less and worked longer than their white counterparts. In early 1933, following several wage decreases, workers began to associate with the local Communist Party USA chapter which organized the workers under the Trade Union Unity League, which was affiliated to the party. That April, workers presented demands to management and after several weeks without an answer, declared a strike on May 15.

The initial walkout involved about 900 workers, and by the second day, about 200 white workers had joined. The strike spread to other Funsten facilities as well as plants owned by other companies and involved an estimated 1,400 workers. The strikers rejected several compromise offers made by Funsten and received support from groups such as the Communist Party and the Unemployed Councils. Within several days, St. Louis Mayor Bernard F. Dickmann began to offer arbitration, and on May 24, the union ratified an agreement that saw wage increases near what they had requested.

In the aftermath of the strike, eleven local union branches were formed and enlisted about 1,400 workers, while the Communist Party recruited about a hundred new members. While the union was initially successful in preventing any downsizing, the company responded by firing certain workers, mechanizing parts of the processing system, and relocating work to other areas. By 1935, the union league had been dissolved. However, historians have highlighted the strike's positive impact on labor organizing in the area, including other industries. Additionally, several historians have said that the strike foreshadowed other civil rights movements and protests in favor of expanded African American rights.

== Background ==
=== Pecan industry in St. Louis ===
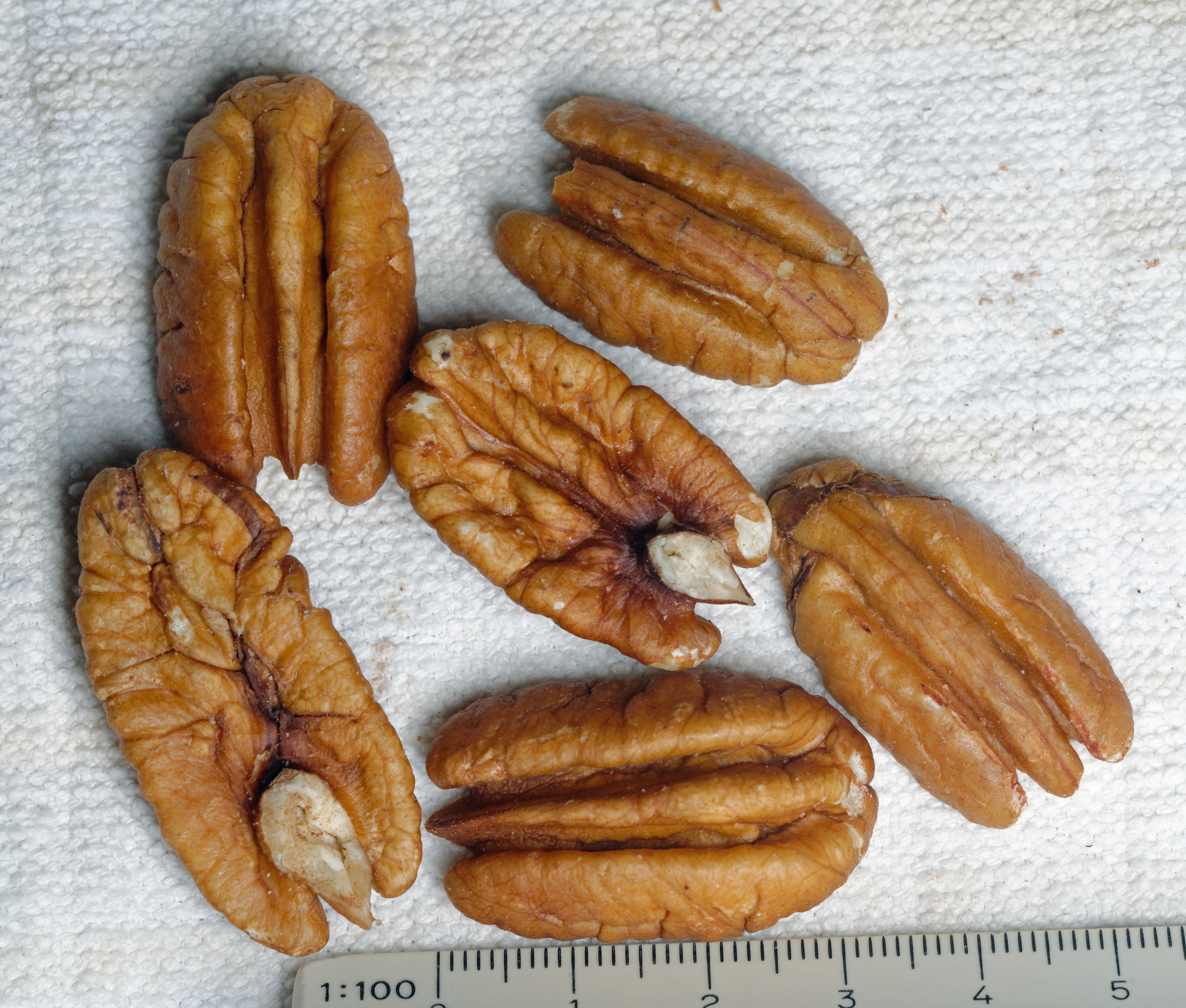
Pecan halves, with a centimeter ruler for scale

St. Louis has historically been a significant center for the processing of pecans, due in large part to their natural range along the Mississippi River valley and the ease with which they could be transported to and from the city via boat. According to historian Clarence Lang, this industry was the city's "major food-processing enterprise". In the Greater St. Louis area in the early 1930s, there were 16 factories that processed pecans. Seven of those were owned by the R. E. Funsten Company, the single largest employer in the market, which included four in St. Louis, Missouri, and three in East St. Louis, Illinois. (Note: Sources vary on the number of Funsten plants in each city. In a 2006 book, historian Rosemary Feurer stated that the company had four plants in St. Louis and three in East St. Louis, while historian Melissa Ford stated in a 2022 book that the company had six factories in St. Louis and only a single plant in East St. Louis.) The company was started in St. Louis in 1895 by its namesake, a businessman from Virginia. By 1933, Funsten's son, Eugene, was the company's president. At the time, the company was valued at approximately $75,000 (equivalent to $1.87 million in 2025). The company's main facility and corporate offices were located at the intersection of Delmar Boulevard and 16th Street. (Note: Other Funsten plants in St. Louis were located at 233 Chestnut Street, 4241 Easton Avenue, and 3404 Walnut Street.)

=== Labor force and working conditions ===
In 1933, the pecan processing industry employed about 3,000 women, with Funsten's main plant employing about 700 women. Industrywide, about 85 to 90 percent of the workforce was made up of black women, with white women constituting much of the remainder. With a total of 1,200 employees, Funsten may have been the single largest employer of black women in St. Louis. About 40 percent of these workers were youths, while a majority were middle-aged and had families that they supported. Only a few men, both African Americans and white Americans, were employed in more specialized positions or as foremen.

At Funsten, the workers operated in racially segregated facilities. For instance, at a plant on Chouteau Avenue, the first floor was where white women worked while the second floor was where black women worked. Additionally, the black and white workers had different times for arriving and departing from the facilities. The black women worked 52 hours per week, from 6:45 a.m. to 4:45 p.m. Monday through Friday, with a 45-minute lunch break. (Note: At the time, Missouri had a law stipulating a maximum of 9 working hours per day, though violations of the law were commonplace.) On Saturdays, they worked until noon. White women's schedules, in contrast, typically ran from 7 a.m. to 4:30 p.m., with an hour-long lunch break. This was part of a larger trend in the region, as St. Louis was host to numerous Jim Crow laws that restricted African American life.

Most of the women worked in "picking", a part of the processing procedure where workers would use a knife to separate the edible nut from its nutshell. The pickers operated in poor working conditions. Dust from the nuts posed a breathing hazard, which was made worse by poor ventilation in the facilities. Additionally, despite being a food-related industry, the plants were not subject to health regulations, and bathrooms were often unsanitary. Sometimes, picking was performed at the workers' houses.

=== Wages and economic conditions in 1930s St. Louis ===
In the two years preceding 1933, workers at Funsten's facilities experienced multiple wage cuts. In a 1933 interview with the St. Louis Star-Times, one worker who had been a Funsten employee for 18 years, Carrie Smith, stated that, while her average weekly wage in 1918 was $18 ($385 in 2025), she was now making no more than $4 ($99 in 2025). Another employee stated that she had received weekly wages of as low as $0.63 ($16 in 2025). On average, African American workers had a weekly wage of $1.80 ($44.77 in 2025), while white workers had a wage of $2.75 ($68.4 in 2025). By contrast, the average weekly wage in 1929 had been about $10 ($187.5 in 2025). For pickers, their pay was based on a piece rate, with African Americans getting paid $0.03 per pound of nut-halves and $0.02 per pound of nut-pieces ($0.75 and $0.5 in 2025). For the same poundage, white workers were paid $0.05 and $0.04 ($1.24 and $0.99 in 2025), respectively.

About half of the Funsten workers at the time were receiving some form of financial assistance. In major cities across the United States, the number of families receiving welfare assistance of some form had risen about 85 to 90 percent compared to 1932 due to the impact of the Great Depression. In St. Louis, the unemployment rate had risen to about 25 percent the previous year. Over the course of the Great Depression, unemployment in St. Louis would peak at about 30 percent, compared to 9 percent prior to the Depression, and roughly 70 percent of black workers were either unemployed or underemployed. As a result, the city was a hotbed for radical labor movements, including campaigns to assist the poor. African Americans were overrepresented in these movements.

=== Organized labor at Funsten ===
Around 1933, the idea of labor organizing at Funsten originated with a relative of two company employees. This man was a member of the Communist Party USA and invited his relatives to attend party meetings. Within a few meetings, a score of women had met and, working with the Communist Party, began to organize under the Food Workers Industrial Union. This union was an affiliate of the Trade Union Unity League, a Communist Party-led labor organization that advocated for industrial unionism. Their involvement with the nut-pickers marked the union's first involvement in St. Louis. Bill Sentner, a party associate and member of the local John Reed Club, served as a union organizer; Smith was the "heart and soul" of the labor action.

A local union with a presiding executive committee was established and the women employees agreed to present the following demands to Funsten's management: union recognition, equal pay for black and white employees, and a wage scale of $0.10 ($2.49 in 2025) per pound of nut-halves and $0.04 per pound of nut-pieces. According to historian Myrna Fichtenbaum, the organizing efforts most likely first took hold at a Funsten plant in western St. Louis, on Easton Avenue. While there were union members at other plants, this plant boasted a union membership of about 100 workers, representing about half of the plant's workforce.

On April 24, 1933, a dozen union members at the Easton Avenue plant presented their demands to management, and they were told that their demands would be conveyed up the management chain and that they would get a response soon. However, after three weeks had passed without a response from the company, the executive committee decided to initiate further organizing efforts at other Funsten plants. On May 12, the union held a meeting with 700 employees at Funsten's main facility and enrolled an additional 15 members into their union. The following day, the union held a large meeting and conducted a vote on whether to initiate a strike action, with the consensus being to strike. The union decided that on Monday, May 15, workers at the Easton Avenue plant would ask for a response to their demands and, if the response was unsatisfactory, they would initiate a walkout and inform workers at the main plant to do the same. This strike action would follow a previous wildcat strike that had occurred at Funsten's main plant in 1927, which had ended in failure for the strikers.

== Course of the strike ==
=== Beginning of the strike ===
On May 15, approximately 900 Funsten employees performed a walkout, initiating the strike. By the second day, the number of striking workers had grown to about 1,400. While only African Americans had been involved in the initial walkout, white workers began to join the strike by the second day. By this time, the strike had expanded to two other Funsten plants, as well as the facilities of two other companies: the Central Pecan Company and the Liberty Nut Company. Following the third day of the strike, the president of Funsten offered the strikers a wage increase of 33 1/3 percent, though this offer was rejected by the strikers. Funsten later offered a pay rate of $0.75 ($18.65 in 2025) per 25-pound (11 kg) box of pecans, though this offer was also rejected.

In justifying his company's position to the press, Funsten stated that the wage cuts had been a result of the economic downturn, highlighting this in an interview with the St. Louis Post-Dispatch where he stated that the company had not made a profit in two years. The St. Louis Argus, an African American newspaper, pushed back against his claims given the current price of pecans, while Fichtenbaum stated that later analysis showed an estimated yearly profit for Funsten of $250,000 at the time.

=== Strike leadership and organization ===
At each plant, the workers elected their own strike committees and leaders, with most of the leaders being black women. The committees held daily meetings to plan strategies, and public meetings were held every morning to keep the strikers informed of any new developments. Additionally, the strikers organized committees to handle negotiations, as well as relief efforts for the workers. The strikers reached out to the broader community for support, with representatives of the workers participating in meetings at local churches and synagogues. Food donations were collected from individuals and groups in the area, such as the Communist Party and the Unemployed Councils, with the Workers International Relief office in Chicago making a donation to the effort.

One of the strike leaders was a middle-aged black woman named Carrie Smith. (Note: Sources describe Smith as being "middle-aged" at the time of the strike, while historian Rosemary Feurer described her as an "older" woman who had been employed by the company since at least 1918. Smith is described as an 18-year-old in a 2023 article in Jacobin.) Among other contributions to the strike, she created the slogan, "We demand ten and four" in reference to the strikers' desired pay scale. She also became well known for picketing with a Bible and a brick in her hands and telling her fellow strikers, "Girls, we can't lose!"

=== Strikers' actions ===
Strikers picketed outside of the affected facilities, with picket signs bearing slogans such as, "Animals in the Zoo Are Fed While We Starve". Protesting began at 5 a.m. every morning and included strikers, their relatives, and other activists from the Communist Party and from the Unemployed Councils. Concerning this latter group, about 600 members were involved in picketing outside of Funsten's headquarters. At some point during the strike, there was a large meeting at the Labor Lyceum, the Communist Party's headquarters in St. Louis, (Note: Per a contemporary article in the Daily Worker newspaper, the headquarters were located at 1343 North Garrison Avenue in St. Louis.) where workers sang "Solidarity Forever". Over the course of the strike, police escorted strikebreakers to the affected plants, resulting in some confrontations with the strikers. While sources vary on the exact number, at least 90 strikers were arrested in these scuffles.

=== Negotiations and conclusion of the strike ===
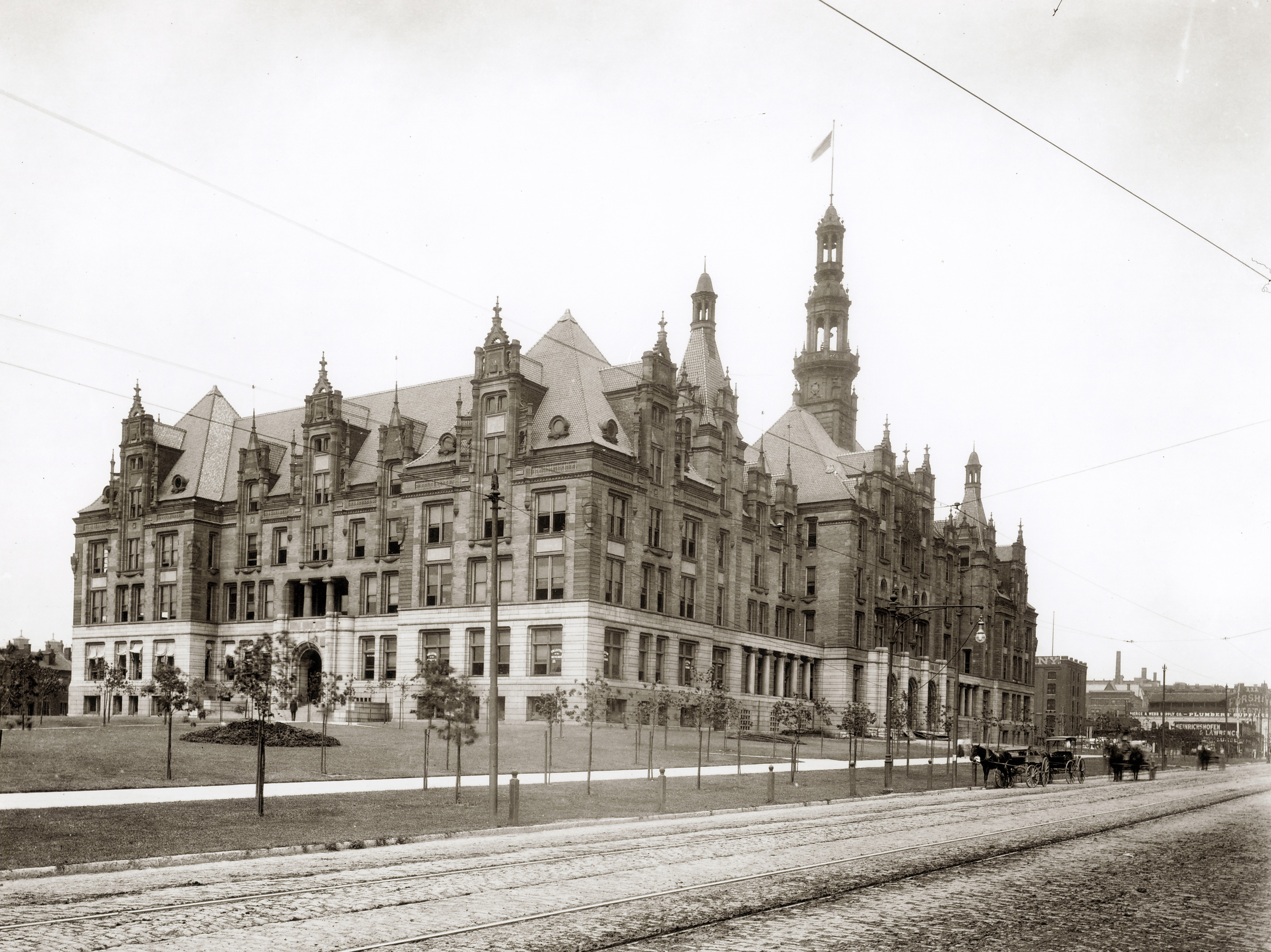
A group of workers petitioned the city government at City Hall (pictured 1900) to serve as arbitrators for the strike.

During the strike, a biracial group of five women met with the city counselor of St. Louis at City Hall in order to ask the city government to act as arbitrators between the strikers and management. On May 22, about a thousand strikers marched from the Communist Party's headquarters to City Hall, where a rally took place. The event prompted the mayor of St. Louis to address the protestors, and he was received with applause as he spoke from the steps of City Hall and said he would meet with some representatives of the strikers. In a conversation with Mayor Bernard F. Dickmann, Smith told him, "We believe we are entitled to live as well as other folks live and should be entitled to a wage that will provide us with ample food and clothing."

On May 23, an all-day meeting was held between the central strike committee, Funsten and his attorney, and a committee organized by the mayor. The mayor's committee was composed of several notable community leaders and had been organized by the mayor to investigate the pay and working conditions at the nut processing facilities. By the end of this meeting, the strike committee had tentatively agreed to a new deal with management that would have seen nut-pickers paid $0.90 ($22.38 in 2025) per 25-lb box of pecans, which was equivalent to a pay scale of $0.08 ($1.99 in 2025) per pound of nut-halves and $0.04 per pound of nut-pieces. Additionally, the pay scale would be equal for both black and white employees. However, the agreement did not specify that the company had to recognize the union as the employees' bargaining representatives.

On May 24, Smith and Mayor Dickmann drove from City Hall to the Communist Party's headquarters, where approximately 700 workers had gathered to vote on the agreement. In a unanimous vote, the workers present accepted the agreement, bringing the strike against Funsten to an end. The other nut-processing companies that had been targeted also agreed to the same pay scale.

== Aftermath ==
The strike, which was the first major labor dispute that St. Louis experienced during the Great Depression, drew national attention. Multiple nut-processing factories in Greater St. Louis, (Note: Sources vary on the exact number of nut-processing plants that were affected by the strike. In a 2023 article in Jacobin, historian Devin Thomas O'Shea stated that five plants were affected. However, in a 2009 book, historian Clarence Lang gave the number as ten, with eight Funsten plants. Meanwhile, a contemporary report in the Daily Worker stated that eleven plants were affected.) including both St. Louis and East St. Louis, were affected. The strike involved about 1,400 workers, (Note: While several historians have stated that the strike involved an estimated 1,400 people, others have given figures of between 1,200 and 1,400 and 2,000.) with a majority being black women. Concerning this latter fact, Fichtenbaum has said, "Unquestionably, the militancy and significant leadership of the Black women was one of the unique features of this struggle."

Following the labor dispute, several of the former strikers joined the Communist Party, with the party enrolling about 100 African American nut-pickers. By the end of the year, African Americans constituted approximately one-third of St. Louis's local Communist Party chapter. Historian Rosemary Feurer stated that the Communist Party's growth with the African American working class was due largely to their focus on African American workers in fields that had traditionally been neglected by the American Federation of Labor, which, in addition to the nut-pickers, included steelworkers, longshoremen, and laundry workers, among others. Sentner benefitted from the success of the strike, eventually serving as the national director of the Food Workers Industrial Union. He would be involved in a number of labor disputes in the Midwestern United States over the next several decades.

=== Union activities and company response ===
Following the strike, roughly 1,400 nut-pickers joined eleven local unions of the Food Workers Industrial Union organized across the Greater St. Louis area. Around the end of May 1933, a central committee of the union held a meeting with Funsten management where they were able to convince the company to not move forward with a planned downsizing that would have led to a third of the company's workforce getting fired. Several additional labor disputes arose over the next several months regarding other issues faced by the nut-pickers, including allegations that they were being cheated out of their deserved wages and a decision by the management at one Funsten plant to not enforce a closed shop.

Shortly after the labor dispute had ended, the Funsten company commenced plans to relocate their nut-processing operations to other areas in the Southern United States. In September 1933, the company made a significant downsizing in their St. Louis operations and later closed three facilities in East St. Louis despite union opposition. The union was further weakened by targeted firings of some of the more militant employees at Funsten and through the implementation of mechanization processes in their plants. Processing work was relocated to San Antonio in Texas, a state where wages were lower than in the St. Louis area. By 1934, much of Funsten's processing work was being performed outside of Greater St. Louis. By this time, according to Lang, "the union was at best on the defensive, and at worst in a state of decline". In 1935, the TUUL was dissolved. By the 1970s, Funsten had become a subsidiary of Pet, Inc.

=== Effect of the strike in other fields ===
Multiple commentators have stated that the initial successful outcome of the Funsten strike inspired future labor disputes in other fields. Both Fichtenbaum and labor historian Philip S. Foner drew a direct link between the Funsten strike and strikes involving garment and laundry workers in St. Louis and Chicago that occurred later in the year. Later, the TUUL, under their Marine Workers Industrial Union, helped organize a walkout of levee workers in St. Louis and East St. Louis. The nut-pickers' strike also inspired the St. Louis chapter of the National Urban League (which had opted to not officially endorse the strikers) to become more attentive to the working conditions of black women. Meanwhile, Mayor Dickmann appointed an attorney to inspect the working conditions at numerous factories in St. Louis and make reports back to the mayor's office.

=== Legacy ===
Writer Jack Conroy, who was an acquaintance of Sentner's through the John Reed Clubs, incorporated elements of the strike into his 1935 novel A World to Win.

In a 2023 article for Jacobin, writer Devin Thomas O'Shea called the strike "one of the most successful labor actions of the Great Depression" and further stated that the strike was "little-known, but ... deserves to go down in the history of Midwestern labor militancy alongside the 1877 general strike". In her history of the strike, Fichtenbaum stated that the historical contributions of black women to the labor movement had been largely neglected. In a commentary on the role of black women in Communist Party activities in St. Louis, Lang stated, "The emphasis on industrial strongmen in Communist iconography ... implicitly devalued black women's particular issues around work and living conditions".

Several commentators have noted that the nut-pickers' strike presaged later civil rights activism. Feurer notes that, following the strike, there was a push in St. Louis among African American activists for a "Bill of Rights for Negroes" that preceded the civil rights movement of the mid-20th century. The bill, which was advocated for by leadership of the Food Workers Industrial Union, sought to bar racial discrimination in housing and employment, among other areas. Discussing the long-term impact of the strike in 2023, historian Keona Ervin said, "I think it's so critical to draw this genealogy of black women's working-class radicalism and to demonstrate this larger history that is a living one. The Ferguson liberation movement, the Fight for $15, the radical tenant organizing in Kansas City—this is all deeply connected."

== See also ==
- 1938 San Antonio pecan shellers strike – another labor strike involving workers in the pecan processing industry
- Communist Party USA and African Americans
- Communist Party USA and American labor movement (1919–1937)
- Strikes in the United States in the 1930s

== Sources ==
- Bucki, Cecelia (2009). "African American and White Women Nutshellers in St. Louis". Social History of the United States. Vol. 4: The 1930s. Santa Barbara, California: ABC-Clio. pp. 176–177. ISBN 978-1-59884-128-2. OCLC 313461994.
- "Strike of Nut Pickers Strong in St. Louis; 2,000 Out for Pay Raise". Daily Worker. Vol. X, no. 123. New York City. May 23, 1933. p. 1.
- Feurer, Rosemary (2006). Radical Unionism in the Midwest, 1900–1950. Urbana, Illinois: University of Illinois Press. ISBN 978-0-252-07319-9. OCLC 652350358.
- Fichtenbaum, Myrna (1991). The Funsten Nut Strike. New York City: International Publishers. ISBN 978-0-7178-0696-6. OCLC 24429435.
- Foner, Philip S. (1980). Women and the American Labor Movement: From World War I to the Present. New York City: Free Press. ISBN 9780029103807. OCLC 6897010.
- Ford, Melissa (2022). A Brick and a Bible: Black Women's Radical Activism in the Midwest during the Great Depression. Carbondale, Illinois: Southern Illinois University Press. ISBN 978-0-8093-3855-9. OCLC 1286070268.
- Gomberg, Paul (2024). Anti-Racism as Communism. London: Bloomsbury Academic. ISBN 978-1-350-25799-3. OCLC 1406409023.
- Graves, Karen (2013) [1998]. "St. Louis Women in United States History: Breaking the Silence". Girl's Schooling During The Progressive Era: From Female Scholar to Domesticated Citizen. New York City: Routledge. pp. 35–100. ISBN 978-1-135-60690-9. OCLC 881183291.
- Lang, Clarence (2009). ""We Demand Ten and Four": Nutpickers and the TUUL". Grassroots at the Gateway: Class Politics and Black Freedom Struggle in St. Louis, 1936–75. Ann Arbor, Michigan: University of Michigan Press. pp. 29–34. ISBN 978-0-472-05065-9. OCLC 698586694.
- Nigro, Kathleen Butterly (1999). "Funsten Nut Pickers Strike". In Corbett, Katharine T. (ed.). In Her Place: A Guide to St. Louis Women's History. St. Louis: Missouri Historical Society Press. pp. 262–264. ISBN 978-1-883982-30-0. OCLC 42038378.
- O'Shea, Devin Thomas (April 18, 2023). ""Girls, We Can't Lose!": In 1930s St Louis, Black Women Workers Went on Strike and Won". Jacobin. ISSN 2158-2602. OCLC 677928766. Archived from the original on August 12, 2025.
- O'Shea, Devin Thomas (June 23, 2025). "The Radical Midwest of Bill Sentner". Jacobin. ISSN 2158-2602. OCLC 677928766. Archived from the original on July 30, 2025.
- Wicentowski, Danny (May 24, 2023). "90 years ago, Black women led a multiracial strike at a St. Louis factory". St. Louis Public Radio. Archived from the original on July 30, 2025.
- Wixson, Douglas (1994). Worker-Writer in America: Jack Conroy and the Tradition of Midwestern Literary Radicalism, 1898–1990. Urbana, Illinois: University of Illinois Press. ISBN 978-0-252-06785-3. OCLC 27810221.
- Wolfe, M. Melissa (2010). "Joe Jones, Worker-Artist". In Walker, Andrew (ed.). Joe Jones: Radical Painter of the American Scene. In association with the University of Washington Press. St. Louis: Saint Louis Art Museum. pp. 33–54. ISBN 9780891780946. OCLC 617592013.
- Zumoff, Jacob (2014). "'Self-Determination' and Comintern Intervention". The Communist International and US Communism, 1919–1929. Leiden: Brill Publishers. pp. 352–364. ISBN 978-90-04-26889-0. OCLC 900892874.
