= Miriam McKinnie =

American painter

- Born: May 22, 1906; Evanston, Illinois, U.S.
- Died: October 22, 1987 (aged 81); Berryville, Arkansas, U.S.
- Other names: Miriam McKinnie Hofmeier
- Occupations: Artist, muralist

Miriam McKinnie (May 22, 1906– October 22, 1987) also known as Miriam McKinnie Hofmeier, was an American artist.

== Education ==
McKinnie was born in Evanston, Illinois. She attended the Minneapolis (MN) School of Fine Art and the Kansas City Art Institute, Kansas City, Missouri. She was a student of Anthony Angarola.

== Mural commissions ==
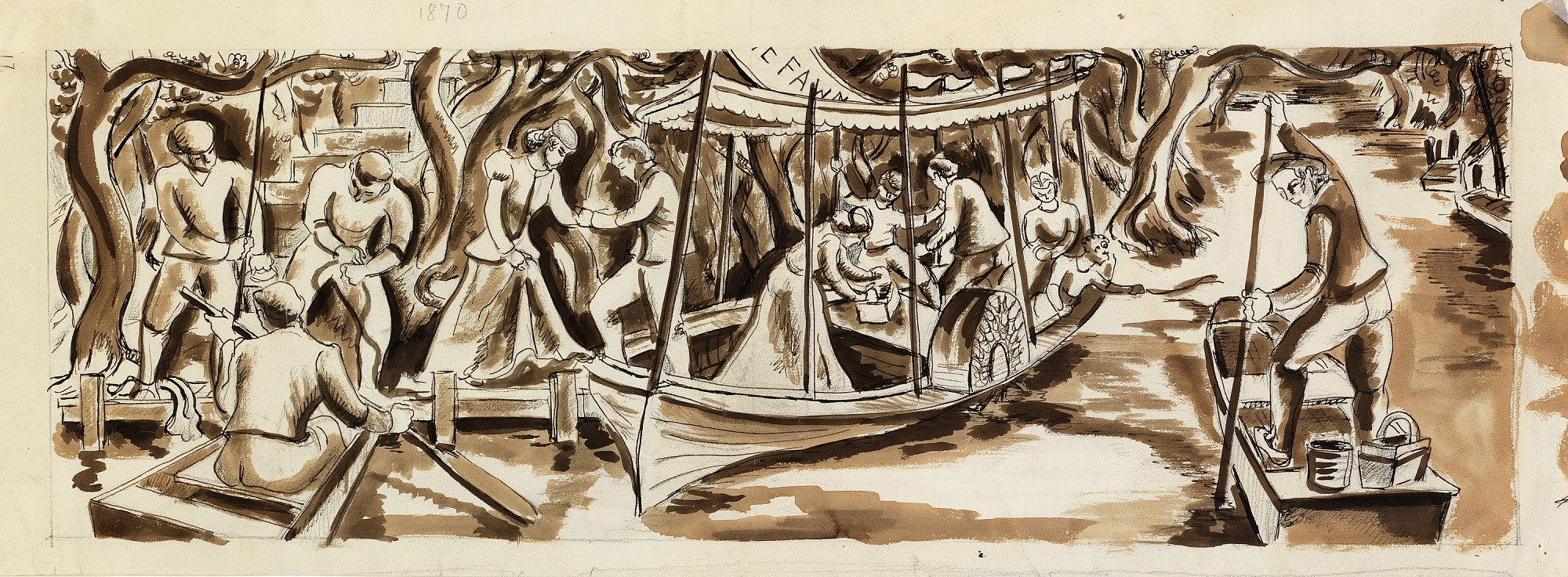
Miriam McKinnie's mural study for the post office in Forest Park, Illinois (1939)

Murals were produced from 1934 to 1943 in the United States through the Section of Painting and Sculpture, later called the Section of Fine Arts, of the Treasury Department. The murals were intended to boost the morale of the American people suffering from the effects of the Depression by depicting uplifting subjects. Murals were commissioned through competitions open to all artists in the United States. Almost 850 artists were commissioned to paint 1371 murals, most of which were installed in post offices, libraries, and other public buildings. 162 of the artists were women. The murals were funded as a part of the cost of the construction with 1% of the cost set aside for artistic enhancements. McKinnie's mural work includes the oil-on-canvas mural titled Harvest in the Marshall, Illinois post office, commissioned by the Treasury Section of Fine Arts, and completed in 1938. McKinnie painted a WPA-commissioned mural in 1940 titled The White Fawn in the United States post office in the Forest Park, Illinois. The Edwardsville, Illinois public library contains four untitled murals donated by McKinnie in 1958 after a fire had destroyed some of the library's interior.

McKinnie was a member of the National Association of Women Painters and Sculptors and later, under its new name the National Association of Women Artists. In the 1930s McKinnie was associated with the Ste. Genevieve Art Colony in Ste. Genevieve, Missouri. Her watercolor rendering of The White Fawn is in the Smithsonian American Art Museum.

McKinnie died on October 22, 1987, in Berryville, Arkansas.

== Exhibitions ==
- St Louis, Missouri Artist Guild, 1929, 1930, 1931, 1933
- Midwestern Exhibition, Kansas City Art Institute, 1932.
- St Louis, Missouri Post Dispatch Exhibit, 1933.
- National Association of Women Painters & Sculptors, 1935, 1937, 1939.
- Biennial, Corcoran Gallery, Washington, DC, 1947

== Awards ==
- Prizes, St Louis, Missouri Arts Guild, 1929, 1930, 1931, 1933
- Silver medal/lithography, Kansas City (MO) Art Institute, 1932
- Honorable Mention/lithography, Kansas City Art Institute, 1932.
- Niedringhaus Prize for lithography, 1933
- Prize, St Louis Missouri Dispatch Exhibit.
- Prizes, National Association of Women Painters & Sculptors, New York City, 1935, 1937, 1939
