= Joseph Vorst =

American painter

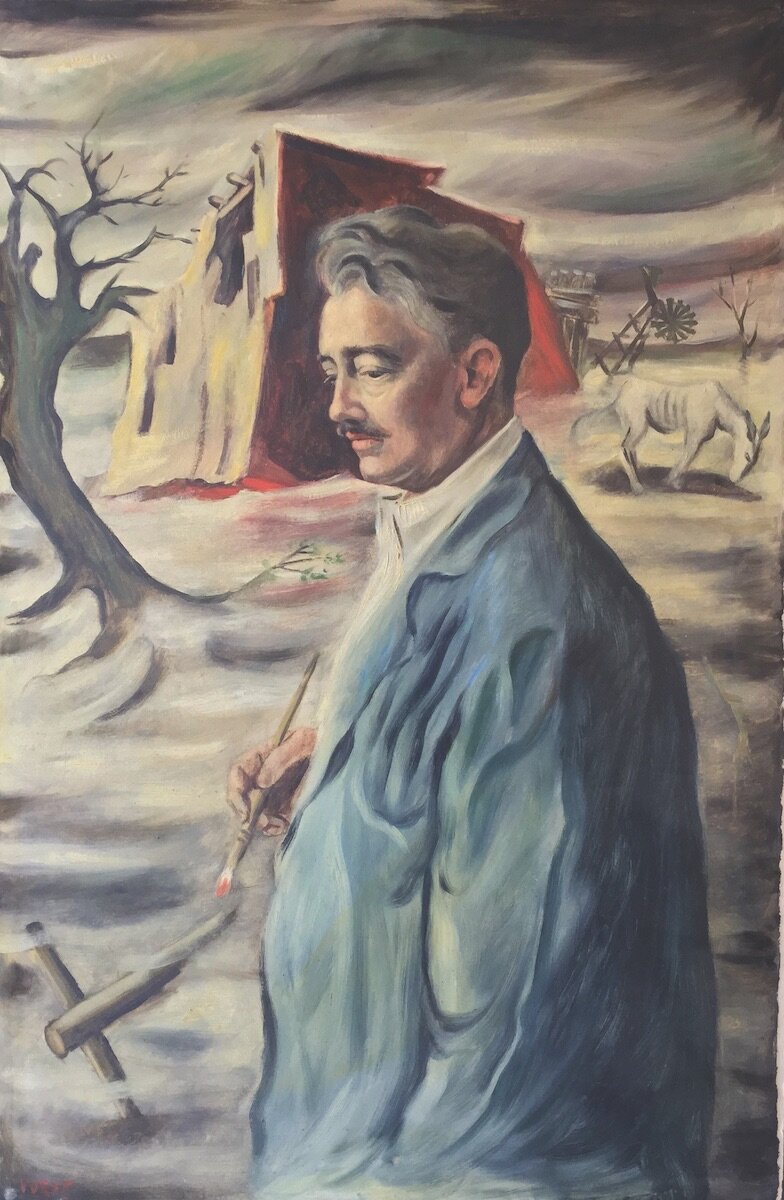
- Self Portrait with Mule, ca. 1947
- Born: Joseph Paul Vorst; June 19, 1897; Essen, Germany
- Died: October 15, 1947 (aged 50); Overland, Missouri
- Resting place: Lake Charles Park Cemetery, Bel-Nor, St. Louis, MO
- Known for: Murals, Lithography
- Movement: Regionalism
- Spouse: Lina Weller (1900-1992)
- Website: josephpaulvorst.com

Joseph Paul Vorst (June 19, 1897 – October 15, 1947) was a German-American visual artist.

== Biography ==
Vorst was born June 19, 1897, in Essen, Germany. He studied at the Folkwang Schule in Hagen before serving in World War I, from which he received a permanent limp. He studied art at the National Academy of Berlin with Max Lieberman and Max Slevogt, and was baptized a member of the Church of Jesus Christ of Latter-day Saints in 1924. He emigrated to the U.S. in 1930, settling in Missouri near his cousins in Ste. Genevieve. He married Lina Weller on June 15, 1935, in St. Louis, Missouri. In the 1930s Vorst was associated with the Ste. Genevieve Art Colony in Ste. Genevieve, Missouri.

He taught art in St. Louis and did much public work for New Deal art projects during the Great Depression. Among other locations Vorst was art director at Jefferson College. According to an article on him in the LDS Improvement Era written by William Mulder he assisted full-time LDS missionaries in St. Louis extensively in sharing the gospel with more people.

He exhibited his work in both the Deseret Gym art room and the Springville Art Museum. An exhibition featuring his life and work was hosted by the LDS Church History Museum in 2017/2018 in Salt Lake City, UT.

Vorst died in Overland, Missouri, on October 15, 1947.

His work is in the collection of the National Gallery of Art, the Saint Louis Art Museum, and the Smithsonian American Art Museum,

== Gallery ==
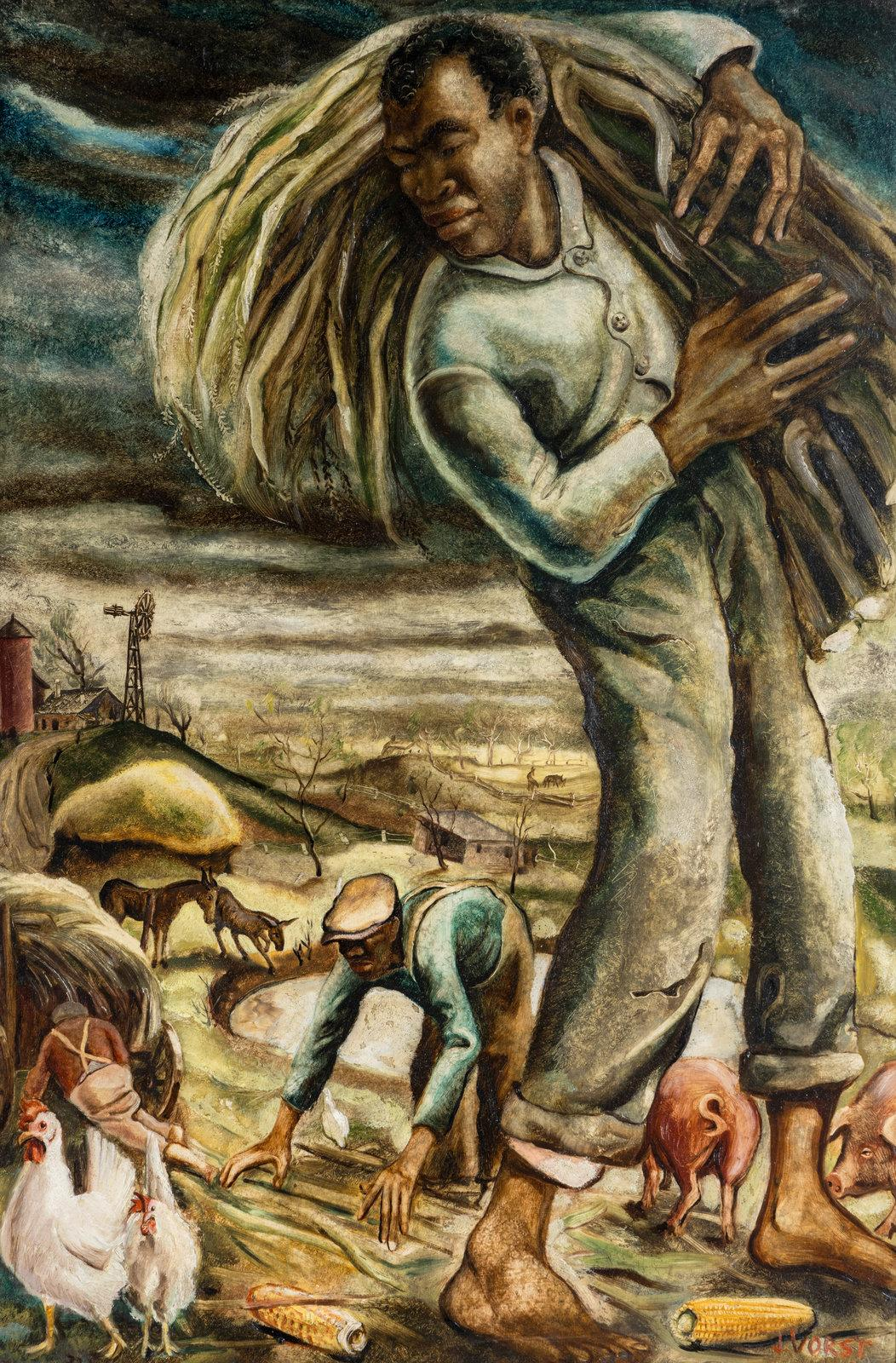
Farm Workers, c. 1938

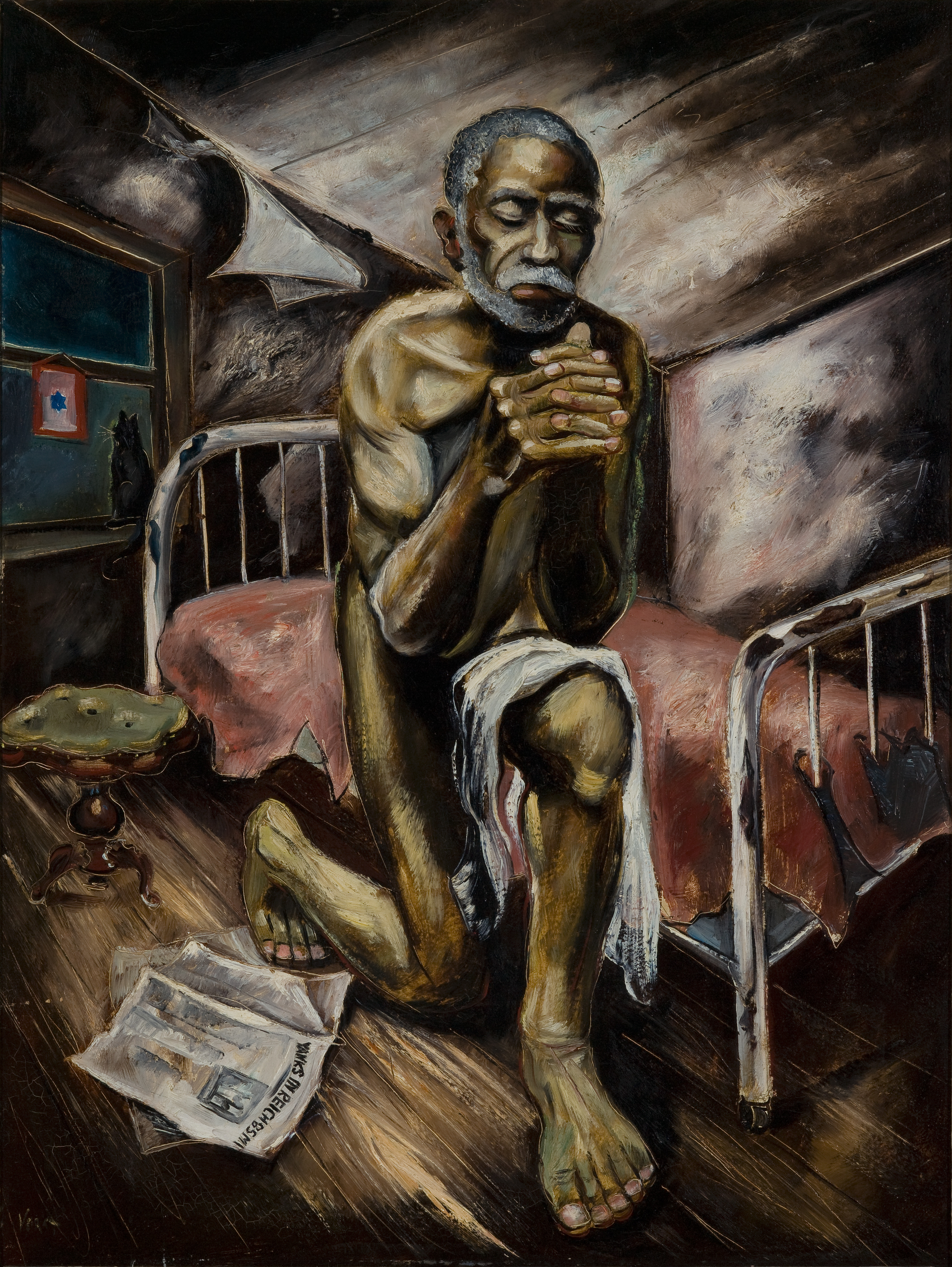
For Thine Is the Kingdom, 1944

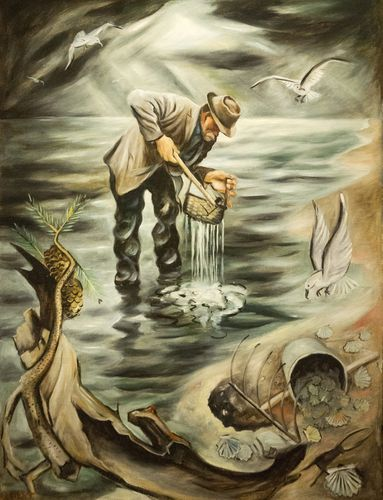
Oyster Fishing

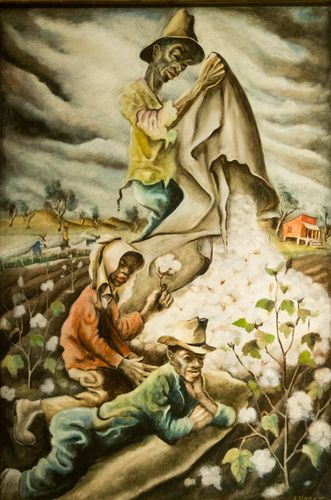
White Gold

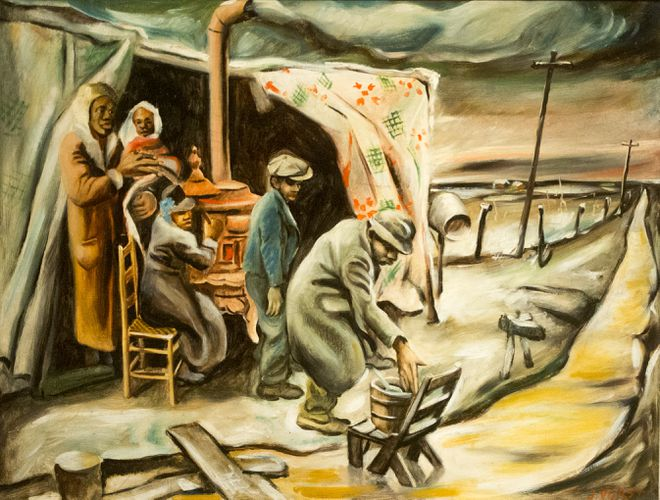
Share Cropper's Revolt

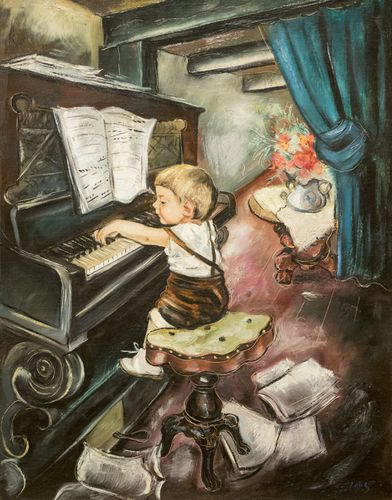
Joseph Vorst - The Talented Son
