= Green Tree Tavern (Janis-Ziegler House) =

Historic house in Missouri, US

- U.S. National Register of Historic Places
- U.S. Historic district – Contributing property
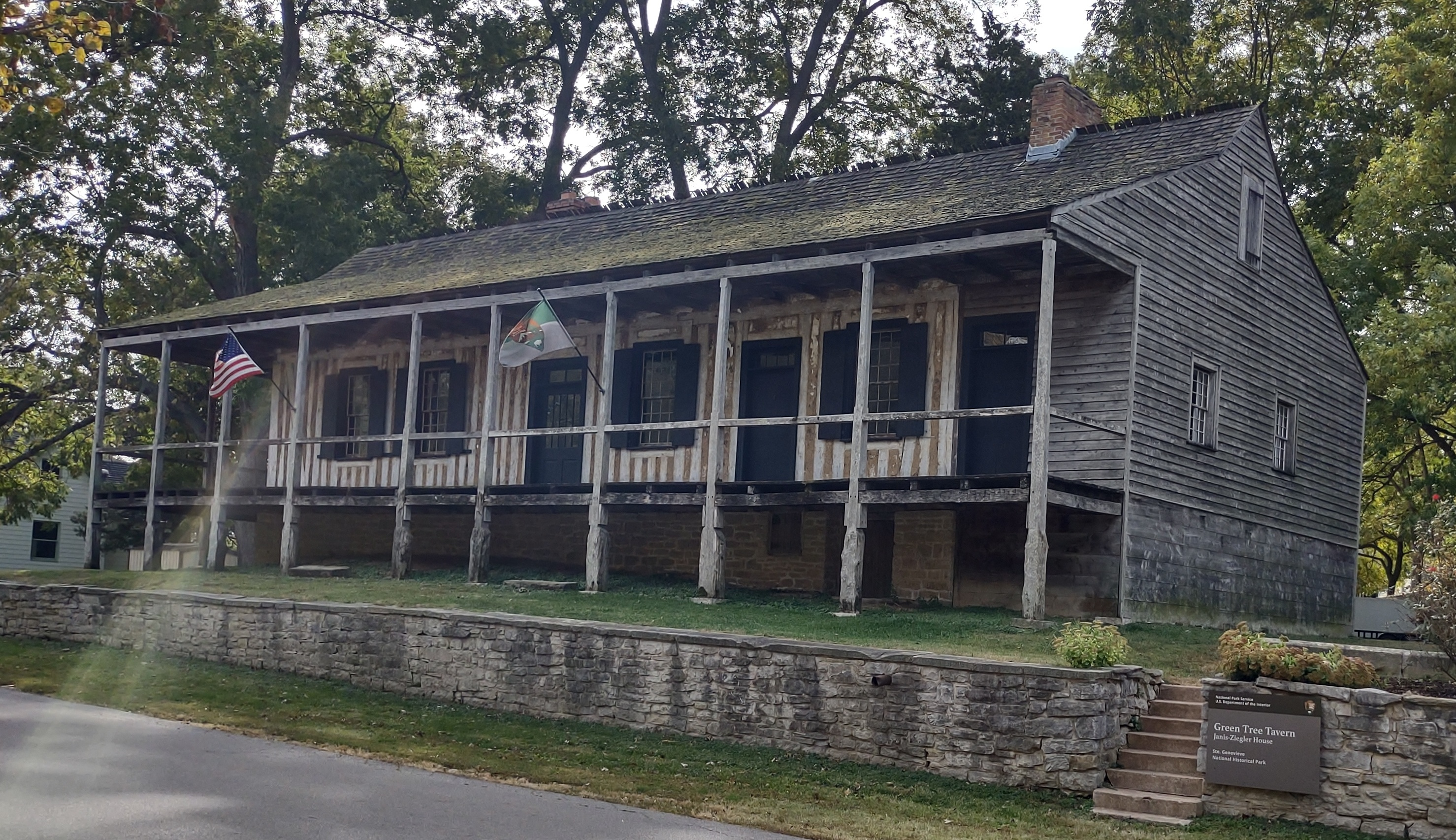

- Location within Missouri Location within the United States
- Location: 241 St. Mary's Road, Ste. Genevieve, Missouri
- Coordinates: 37°58′35.4″N 90°2′31.9″W
- Built: c. 1790-1791
- Architectural style: Poteaux-sur-sol
- NRHP reference No.: 66000892 (original) 02000357 (boundary increase 2002)
- Added to NRHP: October 15, 1966

The Green Tree Tavern, also known as the Janis-Ziegler House, is a poteaux-sur-sol French colonial style house that was built circa 1790–1791 in Ste. Genevieve, Missouri. It is the oldest verified house in Missouri by dendrochronology. The house is listed in the National Register of Historic Places as a part of the Ste. Genevieve Historic District. It is a component of the Ste. Genevieve National Historical Park, a unit of the National Park Service.

== History ==
In 1789 Nicolas Janis, a former resident of Kaskaskia, Illinois, purchased a plot of land from Jean Baptiste LaBreche known as "LaBreche's Cow Pasture." Nicolas started construction of the house in 1790 after he and his family had moved to Ste. Genevieve the prior year. In 1796 he transferred the property to his son, Francois Janis. Around 1803 Francois opened up a tavern in his home. It was in this tavern that on November 14, 1807, the first Masonic Lodge in Missouri, Louisiana Lodge 109, met for the first time. This lodge was the first Masonic lodge west of the Mississippi River having been chartered on June 6, 1806. The Janis family continued to own the house and tavern until 1833 when it was purchased by Mathias and Barbara Ziegler. The Ziegler family opened up a tobacco shop in addition to the tavern becoming one of the earliest recorded tobacco shops in the area. They ran the tavern and shop until the 1850s when the family closed them down and converted the building back into a house. The Ziegler family continued to live in the house until the 20th century.

The 20th century was a time of recognition and disaster for what was one of the oldest houses in Ste. Genevieve. In 1938 a survey of the Janis-Ziegler House was undertaken by the Historic American Buildings Survey under the direction of Alexander Piaget and Charles van Ravenswaay. The house was listed on the National Register of Historic Places as a part of the National Historic Landmark Ste. Genevieve Historic District in 1966. In 1976 Norbert and Frankye Donze, a local couple involved in many historic preservation efforts in Ste. Genevieve, purchased the Janis-Ziegler House which they operated as a house museum until 1992. In 1985 Professor Osmund Overby of the University of Missouri led a second HABS team to document the house. It was during the time of the survey that Dr. Richard Guyette, also of the University of Missouri, took core samples of the logs which dated the house's construction to circa 1790–1791, one of the few houses whose traditional date was not challenged in the area. During the Great Flood of 1993 the house was inundated with water damaging it. The flood also covered the 1803 stone retaining wall, built by Francois Janis, which is today uncovered once again for visitors to behold. Subsequently, in 1996 it was purchased by Hilliard J. Goldman, who began an extensive restoration of the house.

The Janis-Ziegler House was acquired by the state of Missouri in 2017, but after only a few years of state ownership it was given to the National Park Service in 2020. It is currently a part of the Ste. Genevieve National Historical Park, which was authorized in 2018 and established in 2020.

== Architecture ==
The Janis-Ziegler House is an excellent example of French poteaux-sur-sol construction and contains one of the least altered interiors of a French Creole house in the area. This French poteaux-sur-sol method of construction uses a type of infill between the logs called bousillage, a mud and debris mix (straw, grass, and hair typically). The house is not purely French though as it is actually an Anglo-French transitional house with Federal style details. Notably, it has pegged Anglo-American rafters instead of a Norman truss system traditionally used in French houses around the area. In the basement, a unique feature of the house is found. Dividing the basement into two sections is a piece-sur-piece wall which is found nowhere else in Ste. Genevieve. Another unique feature of this house is that the chimneys have triangular bases. There was a major renovation of the house in the 1860s which removed one of these two unique triangular chimneys in the house.

During the restoration of the house starting in 1996 under Hilliard J. Goldman's ownership, many important discoveries and restorations were made. One of the most important discoveries is of one of the largest collections of historical Ste. Genevieve graffiti to date, found on the north gallery's original columns. These columns were removed as the flood waters of 1993 had damaged them. On two of the columns are masonic symbols and on other columns are the initials of Francois Ziegler, Henri Janis, and an "N.J." An important part of the restoration that occurred was the reconstruction of the second triangular fireplace and a missing staircase both of which had been removed in a 1860s renovation of the house.

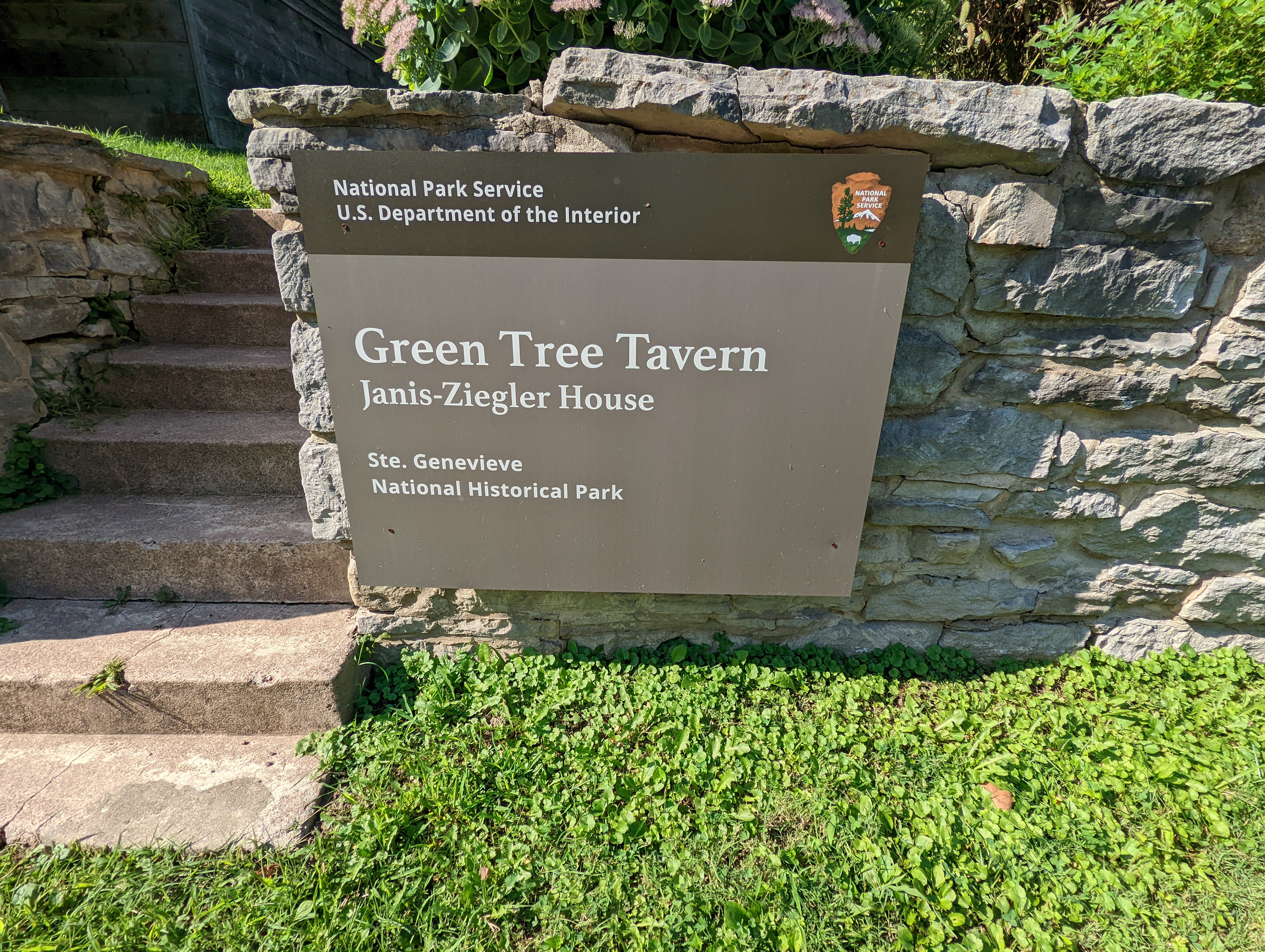
Green Tree Tavern (Janis-Ziegler) NPS Placard

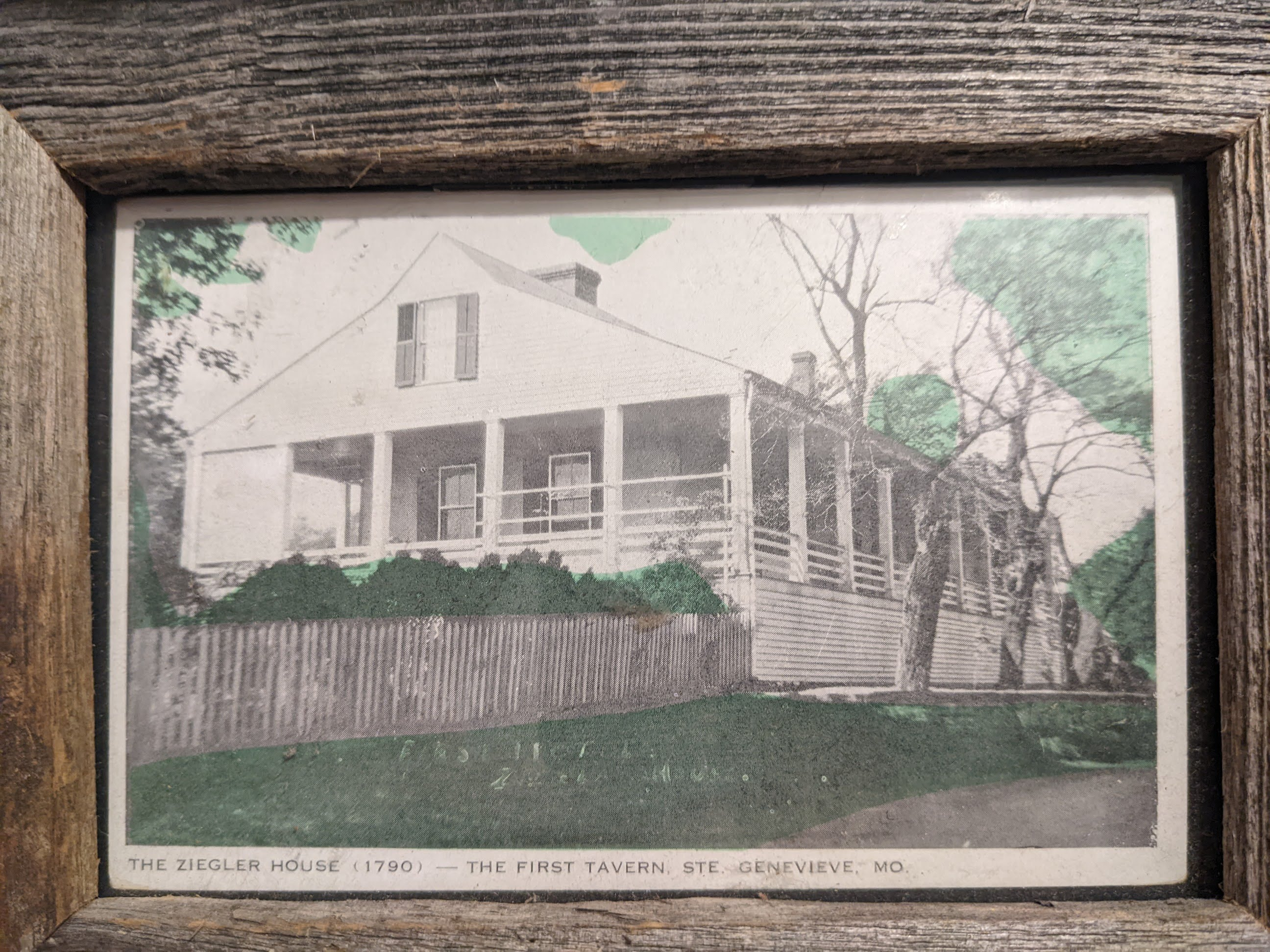
Green Tree Tavern (Ziegler House) Postcard

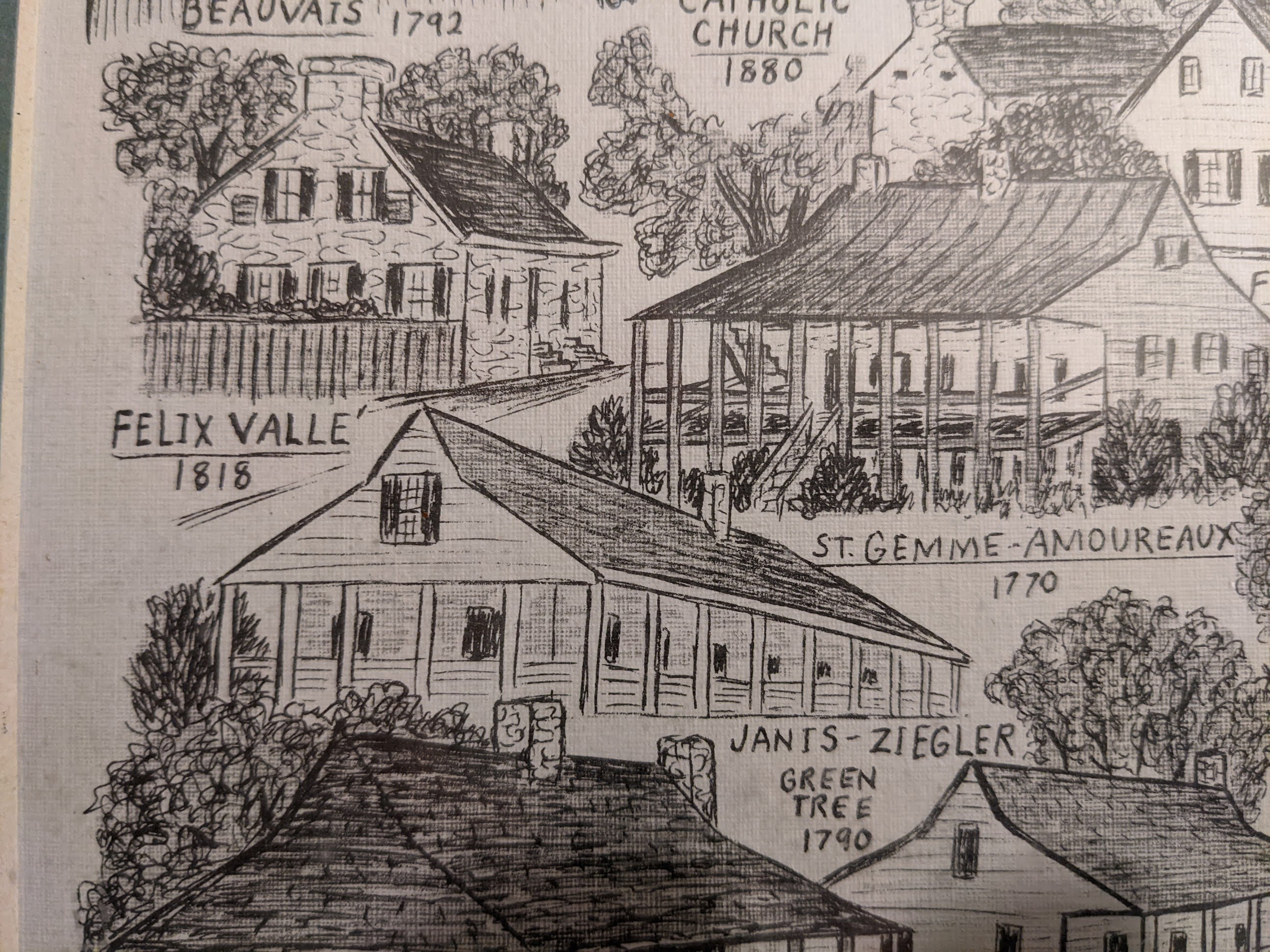
Drawing of Green Tree Tavern (Janis-Ziegler House)

== Gallery ==
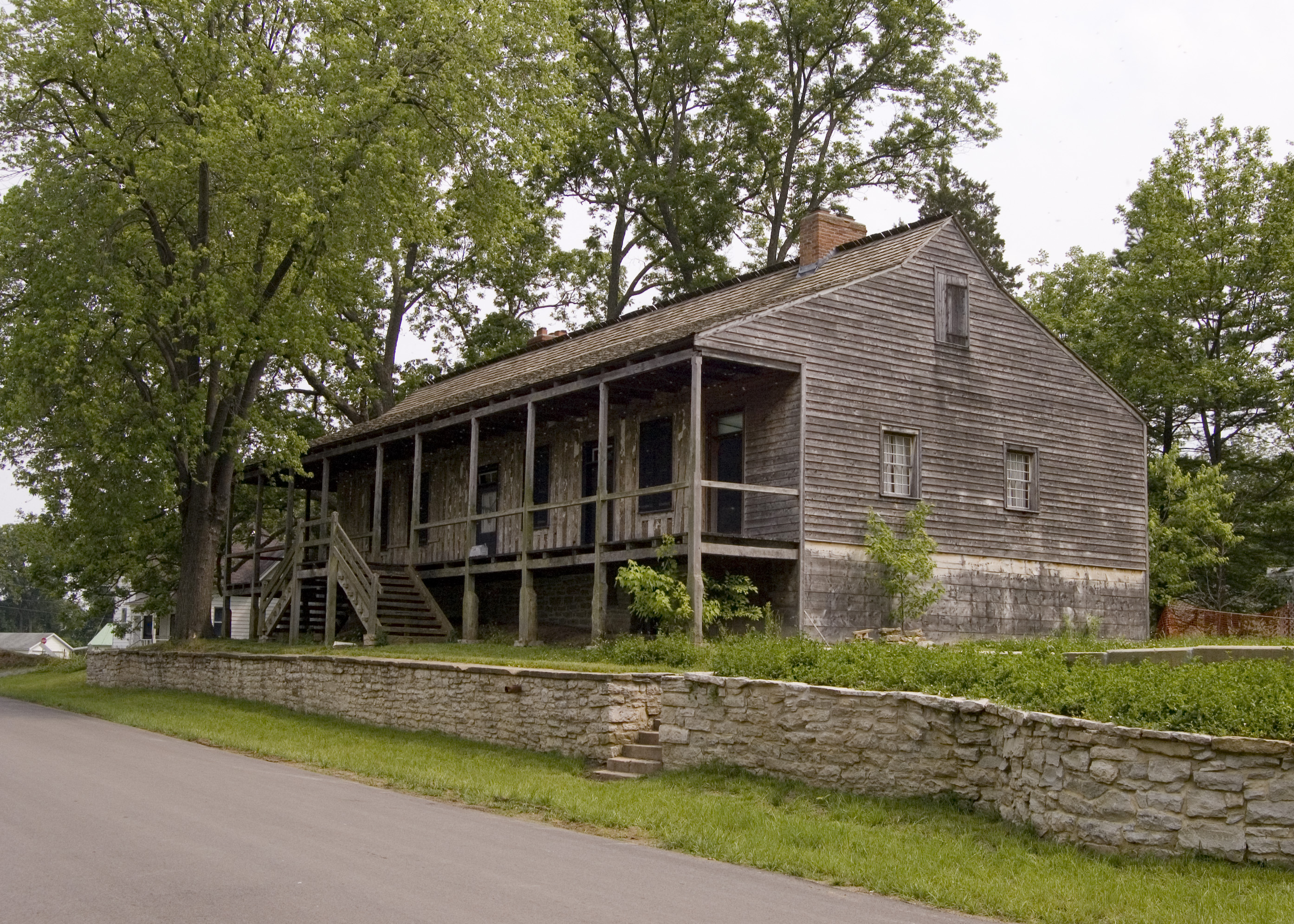
Side of the Greentree Tavern (Janis-Ziegler House) in 2007

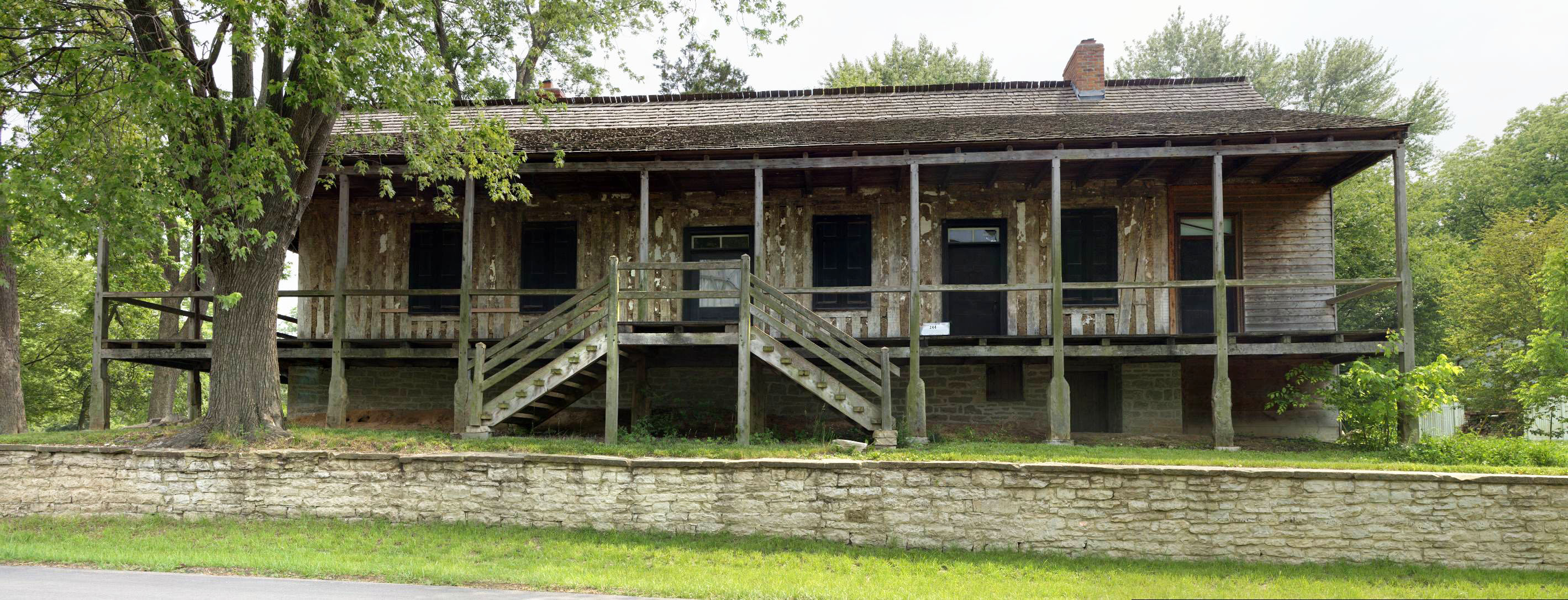
Front of the Greentree Tavern in 2007

== See also ==
- Grand Lodge of Missouri
- List of the oldest buildings in Missouri
- Ste. Genevieve Historic District
- Ste. Genevieve, Missouri
