= Joseph Meert =

American artist

Joseph John Paul Meert
- self portrait, c. 1930
- Born: 1905; Brussels, Belgium
- Died: 1989 (aged 83–84); Waterbury, Connecticut
- Known for: painter, printmaker

Joseph Meert (1905 - 1989) was an American artist who created three New Deal post office murals.

== Biography ==
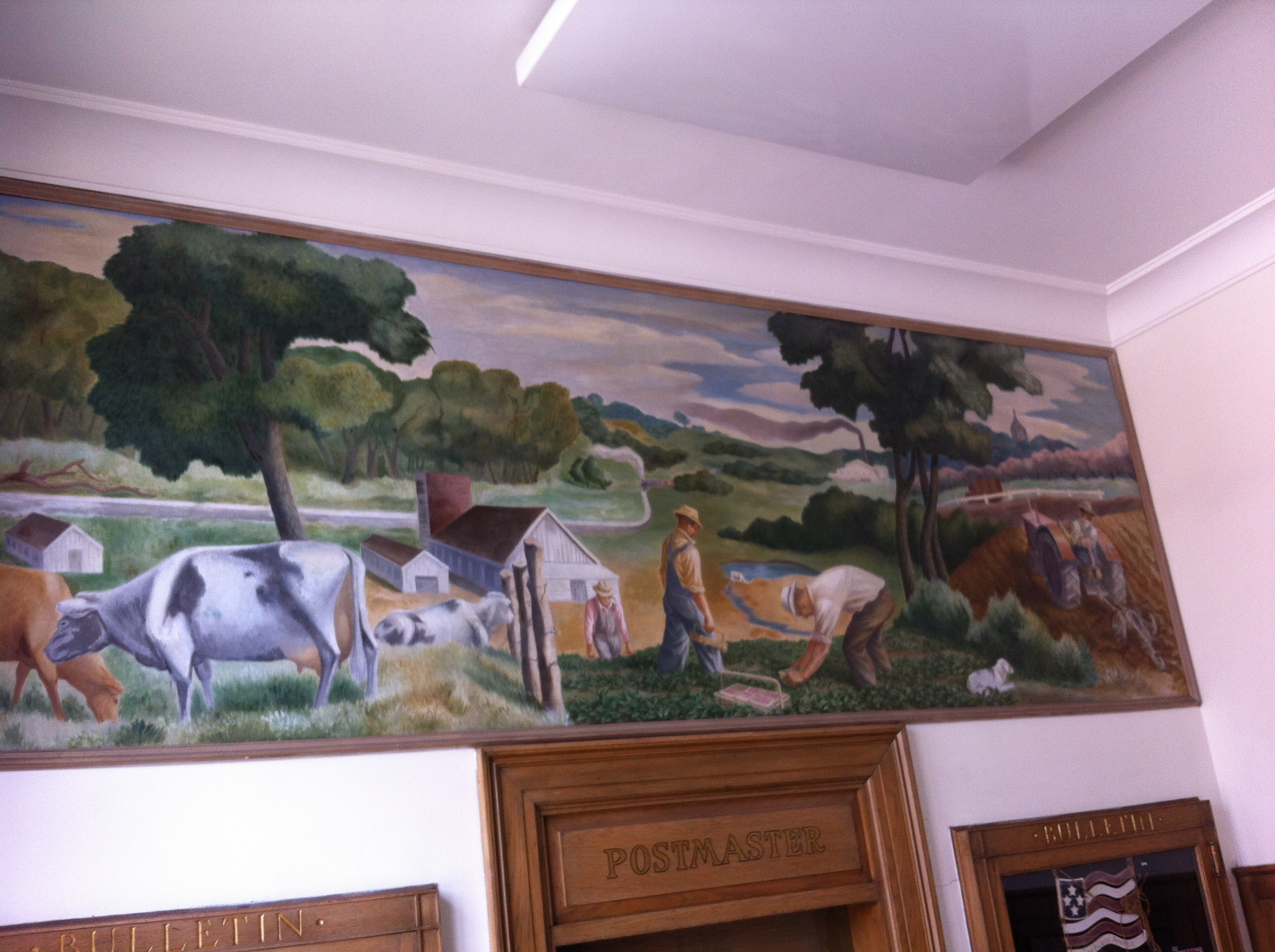
Spring Pastoral (1940), Meert's mural at the post office in Mount Vernon, Missouri

Meert was born in 1905 in Brussels, Belgium. As a child he emigrated with his family to Kansas City, Missouri, US. He studied at the Kansas City Art Institute and then Art Students League of New York. His teachers included Thomas Hart Benton, Kenneth Hayes Miller, Boardman Robinson, and John Sloan.

While at the Art Students League, Meert became friendly with Jackson Pollock. The friendship continued into the 1940s, when Meert retrieved a drunken Pollock from a snow bank into which he had fallen, unconscious.

Meert married fellow artist Margaret Mullin (1910–1980) in the 1930s. The couple located in Kansas City where Meert taught at the Kansas City Art Institute from 1935 through 1941, along with his former teacher Thomas Hart Benton. During this time Meert was commissioned to paint post office murals for the Treasury Section of Painting and Sculpture. In 1938 he completed the mural Contemporary Life in Missouri for the Marceline, Missouri, post office. In 1940 he completed the mural Spring Pastoral for the Mount Vernon, Missouri, post office. The same year he completed the mural Harvesting for the Spencer, Indiana, post office. In the 1930s Meert was associated with the Ste. Genevieve Art Colony in Missouri.

In 1941 the Meerts returned to New York, and by 1946 Meert's style transitioned into abstract art.

Meert's work was included in a 1944 Dallas Museum of Art exhibition of the National Serigraph Society.

Meert's mental health deteriorated in his later years. In 1986 the Pollock-Krasner Foundation provided funds for Meert's care at a facility in Cheshire, Connecticut. Meert died in 1989 in Waterbury, Connecticut.

Meert's work is in the collection of the Art Institute of Chicago, National Gallery of Art, and the Smithsonian American Art Museum.

In 2009 a retrospective of his work, titled Joseph Meert: painting in the shadow of success was held at the Koehnline Museum of Art.
