= Joe Jones (artist) =

American painter and lithographer (1909–1963)

- Born: Joseph John Jones; July 4, 1909; St. Louis, Missouri
- Died: April 9, 1963 (aged 53); Morristown, New Jersey
- Known for: Painting
- Movement: Social realism
- Awards: Guggenheim Fellowship

Joseph John Jones (1909–1963) was an American painter, landscape painter, lithographer, and muralist. Time magazine followed him throughout his career. Jones was associated with the John Reed Club and his name is closely associated with its artistic members, most of them also contributors to the New Masses magazine.

== Background ==
Jones was born in St. Louis, Missouri, April 7, 1909. Self-taught, he quit school at age fifteen to work as a house painter, his father's profession. He was childhood friends with Bill Sentner and later organized together in the St. Louis John Reed Club.

== Career ==
Jones worked in his native St. Louis, Missouri, until age 27, then spent the rest of his life based in or around New York City. His work is in the collection of the Cleveland Museum of Art, the Denver Art Museum, the Detroit Institute of Arts, the National Gallery of Art, the Saint Louis Art Museum, the Smithsonian American Art Museum, and the Whitney Museum of American Art.

=== Missouri ===
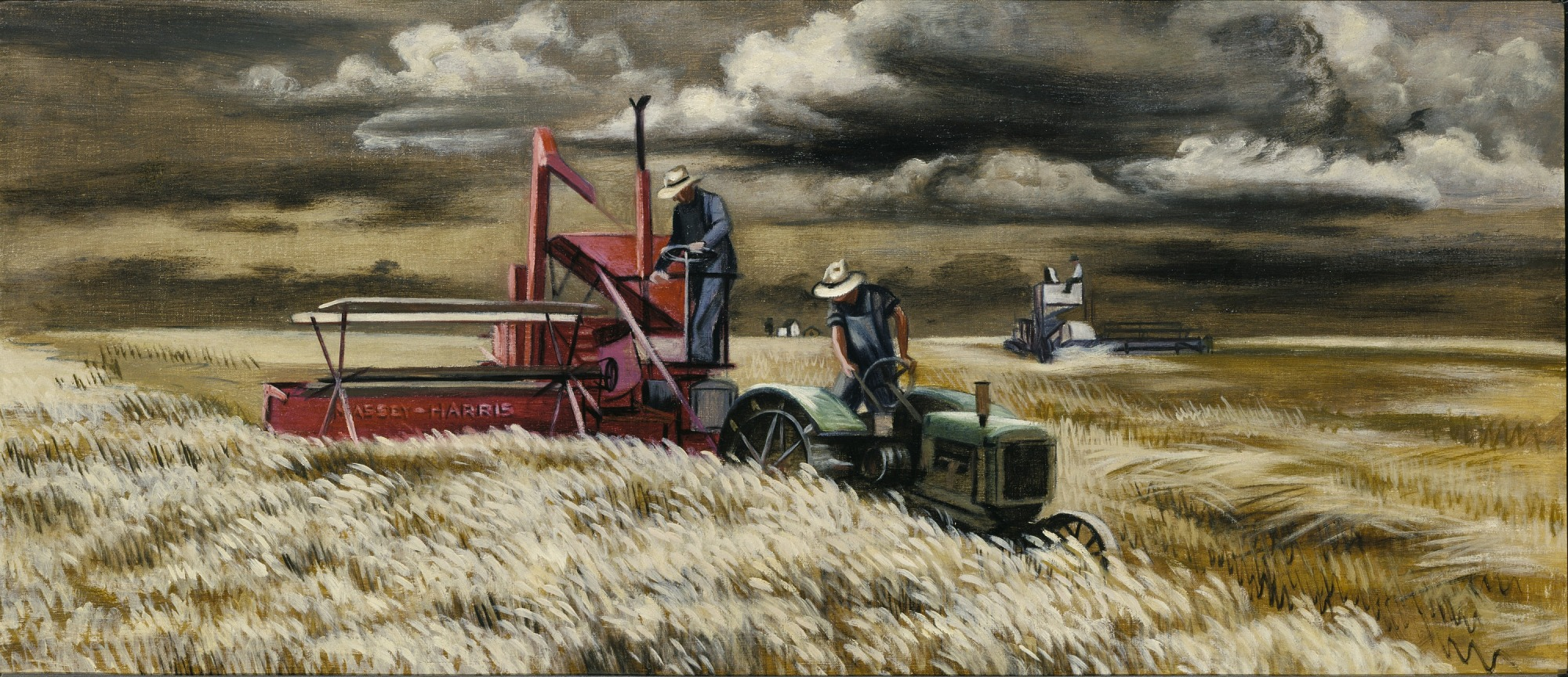
Jones's study for Men and Wheat (1939), mural for the post office in Seneca, Kansas

Jones' experiments in painting won him a series of prizes at the St. Louis Art Guild exhibitions. Following these came a commission to paint a mural at the KMOX radio station and a solo exhibition by the guild.

In 1933, ten patrons led by Elizabeth Green in St. Louis formed a "Joe Jones Club" and financed his travel to the artists' colony in Provincetown, Massachusetts. While some critics have considered his early paintings as typical of the Midwestern Regionalist style exemplified by the work of Thomas Hart Benton, others have stated that he was in fact "anti-Regionalist". By then, Jones had only from magazines; art historian Andrew Hemingway surmises that Jones absorbed Modernist and Cubist ideas also from paintings. Upon his return to St. Louis, Jones lived in a houseboat.

In August 1935, Jones painted a mural series at the Commonwealth College at Mena, Arkansas. Jones painted a New Deal mural for the post office in Charleston, Missouri, titled Harvest in 1938. This mural was done at the height of Jones' fame and is a classic subject for Jones. It depicts the harvest of wheat in a very labor-intensive manner showing the cutting, gathering, and stacking of it onto a wagon. Under a cloudy dark sky, wheat dominates the perspective with the farmers providing a great deal of motion. Another New Deal mural entitled Men and Wheat was painted by Joe Jones in 1940, followed by Husking Corn in 1941 for the Dexter, Missouri, post office, Turning a Corner in 1939 in Anthony, Kansas and Threshing in Magnolia, Arkansas, in 1938. All the murals depicted some process during a wheat harvest. Of the "revolutionary element" his early work, Jones wrote to Green, it is "not warped to bias to any party" except for the "militant struggle of the working class," which he contrasted to artists who believed in the Communist Party.

In the 1930s Jones was associated with the Ste. Genevieve Art Colony in Ste. Genevieve, Missouri. He visited there and also taught. He served as direction in 1936

=== New York ===
Perhaps Jones' first appearance in New York came with his painting "Wheat" at the Whitney Museum's Second Biennial of Contemporary American Painting (1934–1935).

In 1935, Time magazine ran its first story about Jones: "Housepainter" (June 3, 1935). It reported that Jones had contributed a painting to the "Sixteen Cities Show" in Manhattan's Museum of Modern Art, whose autobiography read, "Joe Jones. Born St. Louis, 1909. Self-taught." By this time, Jones had become a Communist... Back in St. Louis, Jones promoted such thinking in his art classes at the St. Louis Artists Guild. In response, the city's Public Safety director had Jones removed.

When Jones came to New York, a symposium by the New Masses celebrated his arrival on February 2, 1936. Participating were Louis Bunin (puppeteer), Stuart Davis (American Artists' Congress), Joseph Freeman (literary critic and founder of the New Masses), William Gropper (fellow painter and cartoonist), Jerome Klein (critic of the New York Post, and Roger Baldwin (chairman).

Time reported on both of these one-man shows in New York, first at the ACA Gallery in 1935, followed by the Walker Gallery in 1936. The first show included the paintings We Demand, Garbage Eaters, Demonstration, The New Deal, and the shocking American Justice. The second show included We Demand, Garbage Eaters, Demonstration, and his latest, Threshing No. 1.

In 1937 the Metropolitan Museum of Art acquired at least one Joe Jones painting as part of (then) 85 paintings of living American artists. The same year Jones was awarded a Guggenheim Fellowship to document conditions in the Dust Bowl. His work was still being classed as "proletarian" in a Time article,"Art:Year." in 1938 and a second article on Baltimore's first exhibition of "Labor in Art" at the Baltimore Museum of Art.

His mural Turning a Corner in the Anthony United States Post Office, in Anthony, Kansas, was painted in 1939.

=== World War II ===
In 1943, Joe Jones was enlisted into the War Art Unit. Although the Army background check revealed Jones was a member of the Communist Party, the art program's chief advisor, George Biddle, supported him, stating that Jones was "willing to swear that he never had any intention or obligation to disrupt the American Government". Jones was assigned to the Alaska Defense Command, at Fort Richardson, outside Anchorage, Alaska.

=== New Jersey ===
By 1951, for a new show in New York, Time was reporting the "angry man calms down." The paintings on exhibit showed "delicately colored, wiry-lined pictures of beaches, towns, and harbors... without a park of sorrow or anger in them." Jones (then, 42 years old) did not want to "sit on top of a reputation," had lost interest in Communism, and removed "class war" from his paintings. He became interested in delicate lines and low-toned colors, a reaction against "the preoccupation with light and shade that has victimized Western art since the Renaissance." By this time, he saw paintings as "space, not objects" and sought humanism not in subject but "of the line." By this time, he was already residing in Morristown, New Jersey.

By 1952, Time had cited him as one of 48 artists whose 250 paintings had been commissioned by Standard Oil of New Jersey. Time mentioned Jones with other of the 48 artists by name: the other two were Peter Hurd and Thomas Hart Benton.

=== Time magazine covers ===
For May 1961, Jones painted The Faraway Places for a Time cover story in its Modern Living section on travel. Time announced his addition to "the small group (about 80 men over the past 38 years) who have painted a Time cover." According to a Letter from the Publisher, Jones, who had done little foreign travel, "riffled through scads of travel photographs" and produced a work depicting a girl from Tahiti, cliffs near Beirut, a Greek island, and a Portofino harbor.

For December 1961, Time used one of his paintings for their annual Christmas issue. (Jones based the painting on "impressions of the seasonal scene in Atlanta.")

== Personal life and death ==
In the 1930s, Jones was a member of the John Reed Clubs.

Jones died on April 9, 1963, in Morristown, New Jersey. As reported by Time he was 54 years old. Of his early, radical work, the magazine cited American Justice with the corpse of a half-naked black woman who has been raped and lynched against a background of quietly chatting Ku Klux Klansmen. For his later, "softer Japanese-like style," it cited his December 1961 cover and a mural of Boston Harbor in the dining salon of the SS Independence.

== Legacy ==
In 2010 a monograph entitled Joe Jones: Radical Painter of the American Scene was published by the Saint Louis Art Museum. In 2017 the Albrecht-Kemper Museum of Art held a retrospective exhibition entitled The Restless Regionalist: The Art of Joe Jones.
