= Bernard E. Peters =

American artist

- Born: August 8, 1893; Saint Louis, Missouri
- Died: May 21, 1949 (aged 53); Saint Louis, Missouri
- Known for: Painter
- Movement: American regionalism

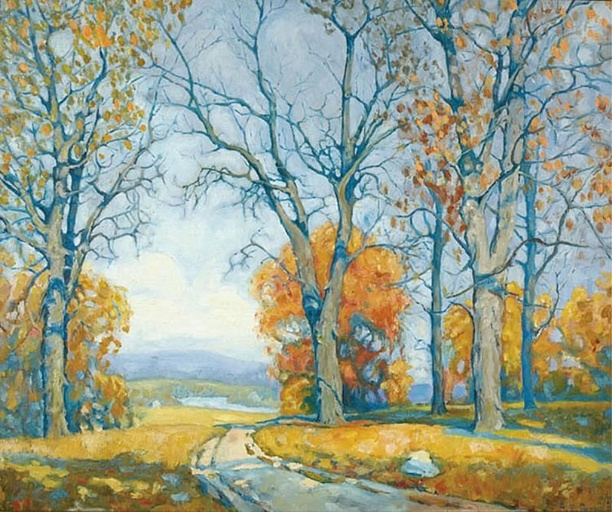
Sun filled autumn landscape with dirt road, 1927

Bernard E. Peters (1893–1949) was an American artist and co founder of the Ste. Genevieve Art Colony.

== Biography ==
Peters was born on August 8, 1893, in St. Louis, Missouri. He studied at the University of Missouri and Harvard University. He taught art at Cleveland High School in St. Louis. He was married to Ord Peters.

At the suggestion of his friend Frank Nuderscher, visited rural Ste. Genevieve, Missouri, in 1932. He and Jessie Beard Rickly, along with their families rented a house at 202 Merchant Street, sharing studio space which became the Ste. Genevieve Art Colony. The third co founder of the colony was Aimee Schweig. The following year the Peters settled in nearby St. Mary, Missouri. Peters was a member of the St. Louis Artists' Guild, the St. Louis Industrial Art Club, and the Two-by-Four Society.

Peters died of Bright's disease on May 21, 1949, in Saint Louis, Missouri at the age of 53.

His work is in the collection of Midwestern art at the St. Louis University High School.
