= Jessie Beard Rickly =

American artist

- Born: Jessie Beard; October 5, 1895; Poplar Bluff, Missouri
- Died: August 24, 1975 (aged 79); Saint Louis, Missouri
- Known for: Painter
- Movement: American regionalism

Jessie Beard Rickly (1895-1975) was an American artist and co founder of the Ste. Genevieve Art Colony.

== Biography ==
Rickly née Beard was born on October 5, 1895, in Poplar Bluff, Missouri. She attended the St. Louis School of Fine Arts where her teachers included Oscar E. Berninghaus and Edmund H. Wuerpel. There she first met fellow artist Aimee Schweig. Rickly also studied at Harvard University. She was married to Francis Rickly. In the 1920s Rickly attended plein air painting classes at the Provincetown art colony, taught by Charles Webster Hawthorne.

In the early 1930s, during the Great Depression and after the closing of Provincetown art colony, Rickly along with Aimee Schweig and Bernard E. Peters established the Ste. Genevieve Art Colony in Ste. Genevieve, Missouri. In 1935 Rickly broke ties with the art colony.

Rickly went on to organize the group of artists known as The New Hats which advocated for Regionalism and other contemporary art. She was a member of the St. Louis Artists' Guild.

Rickly died on August 24, 1975, in Saint Louis, Missouri. Her work is in the collection of the National Gallery of Art, and the Smithsonian American Art Museum.
