= Aimee Schweig =

American painter (1892–1987)

- self portrait
- Born: Aimee Gladstone; January 30, 1892; St. Louis, Missouri, US
- Died: February 13, 1987 (aged 95); St. Louis, Missouri, US
- Education: Provincetown Art Colony; St. Louis School of Fine Arts, Washington University
- Known for: Painter
- Movement: American regionalism

Aimee Gladstone Schweig (1892–1987) was an American artist known as one of the founders of the Ste. Genevieve Art Colony. Her paintings depict primarily local subjects from the Ste. Genevieve and other Missouri areas.

== Biography ==
Schweig was born on January 30, 1892, in St. Louis, Missouri. She was married to the photographer Martin Schweig, Sr. She was the mother of the artist Martyl Schweig Langsdorf, and the portrait photographer Martin Schweig, Jr. She studied at the St. Louis School of Fine Arts at Washington University in St. Louis. She continued her studies at the Provincetown Art Colony (Provincetown, Massachusetts) In the early 1930s, during the Great Depression and after the closing of Provincetown art colony, Schweig along with Jessie Beard Rickly and Bernard E. Peters established the Ste. Genevieve Art Colony in Ste. Genevieve, Missouri.

Schweig taught art at the Mary Institute for over two decades. She was a member of the National Association of Women Artists, the St. Louis Artists' Guild, and the Provincetown Art Association. Her artwork was exhibited in numerous shows and she won a number of awards, including the 1945 City Art Museum Exhibition. She was also featured in publications such as "An American Art Colony; The Art and Artists of Ste. Genevieve, Missouri." She primarily used oil paints and her subjects varied from people to abstract art.

Schweig died on February 13, 1987, in St. Louis.
