= Johns Creek (disambiguation) =

Johns Creek is a city in the U.S. state of Georgia.

Johns Creek may also refer to:

- Johns Creek (Chattahoochee River), a stream in Georgia
- Johns Creek (Oostanaula River), a stream in Georgia
- Johns Creek (Little Lost Creek), a stream in Missouri
- Johns Creek (Saline Creek), a stream in Missouri
- Johns Creek (Jackson County, North Carolina), a stream in North Carolina

== See also ==
- Saint Johns Creek (disambiguation)
