= River aux Vases =

River aux Vases may refer to:

- River aux Vases, Missouri, a community in Ste. Genevieve County, Missouri
- River aux Vases (stream), a creek in Ste. Genevieve County, Missouri
