= Étienne Cabet =

French philosopher (1788–1856)

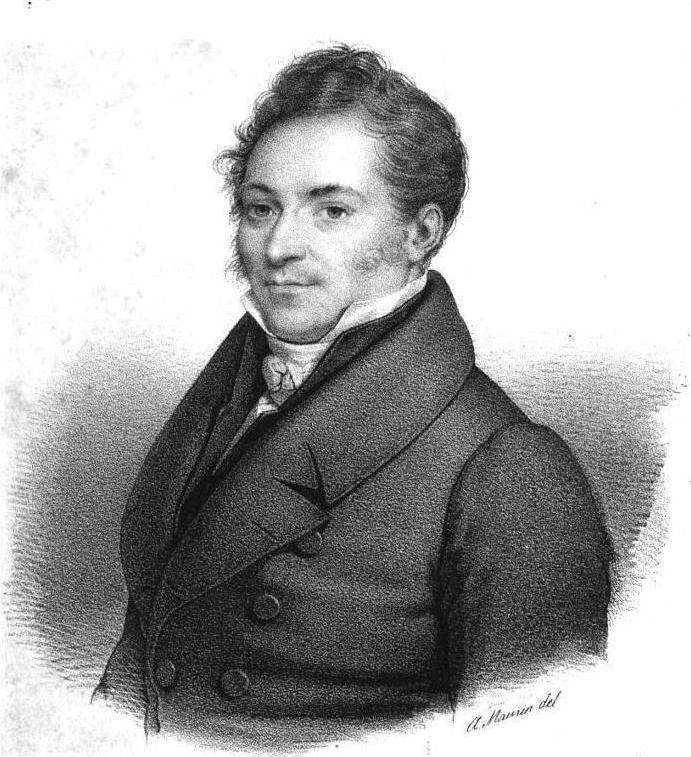
- Engraving by Antoine Maurin (1840)
- Born: January 1, 1788; Dijon, Burgundy, Kingdom of France
- Died: November 9, 1856 (aged 68); St. Louis, Missouri, U.S.
- Occupation: Philosopher
- Known for: Founder of the Icarian movement
- Notable work: Travel and Adventures of Lord William Carisdall in Icaria (1840)

Étienne Cabet (French: [etjɛn kabɛ]; January 1, 1788 – November 9, 1856) was a philosopher and utopian socialist who founded the Icarian movement. Cabet became the most popular socialist advocate of his day, with a special appeal to artisans who were being undercut by factories.

Cabet published Voyage en Icarie in French in 1839 (and in English in 1840 as Travels in Icaria), in which he proposed replacing capitalist production with workers' cooperatives. Recurrent problems with French officials (a treason conviction in 1834 resulted in five years' exile in England), led him to emigrate to the United States in 1848. Cabet founded utopian communities in Texas and Illinois, but was again undercut, this time by recurring feuds with his followers.

== Early and family life ==
Cabet was born in Dijon, the youngest son of a cooper from Burgundy, Claude Cabet, and his wife Francoise Berthier. He was educated as a lawyer. Cabet married Delphine Lasage on March 25, 1839 at Marylebone, London, during his exile in England, who bore a child.

== Career in France ==
Cabet secured an appointment as attorney-general in Corsica. He represented the government of Louis Philippe, despite having headed an insurrectionary committee during the July Revolution of 1830 which led to the ouster of the "Republican Monarch" King Charles X (and the ascent of Louis Philippe). However, Cabet lost this position for his attack upon the conservatism of the government in his Histoire de la révolution de 1830. Nonetheless, in 1831, Cabet was elected to the Chamber of Deputies in France as the representative of Côte d'Or, and sat with the extreme radicals. Accused of treason in 1834 because of his bitter attacks on the government both in the history book and subsequently, Cabet was convicted and sentenced to five years' exile. He fled to England and sought political asylum. Influenced by Robert Owen, Thomas More and Charles Fourier, Cabet wrote Voyage et aventures de lord William Carisdall en Icarie (Travel and Adventures of Lord William Carisdall in Icaria, 1840), which depicted a utopia in which a democratically elected governing body controlled all economic activity and closely supervised social life. "Icaria" is the name of his fictional country and ideal society. The nuclear family remained the only other independent unit. The book's success prompted Cabet to take steps to realize his Utopia.

In 1839, Cabet returned to France to advocate a communitarian social movement, for which he invented the term communisme. Some writers ignored Cabet's Christian influences, as described in his book Le vrai christianisme suivant Jésus Christ ("The real Christianity according to Jesus Christ", in five volumes, 1846). This book described Christ's mission to be to establish social equality, and contrasted primitive Christianity with the ecclesiasticism of Cabet's time to the disparagement of the latter. In it, Cabet argued that the kingdom of God announced by Jesus was nothing other than a communist society. The book also contained a popular history of the French Revolutions from 1789 to 1830.

In 1841 Cabet revived the Populaire (founded by him in 1833), which was widely read by French workingmen, and from 1843 to 1847 he printed an Icarian almanac, a number of controversial pamphlets as well as the above-mentioned book on Christianity. There were probably 400,000 adherents of the Icarian school.

== Emigration to the United States of America ==
In 1847, after realizing the economic hardship caused by the depression of 1846, Cabet gave up on the notion of reforming French society. Instead, after conversations with Robert Owen and Owen's attempts to found a commune in Texas, Cabet gathered a group of followers from across France and traveled to the United States to organize an Icarian community. They entered into a social contract, making Cabet the director-in-chief for the first ten years, and embarked from Le Havre, February 3, 1848, for New Orleans, Louisiana. They expected to settle in the Red River valley in Texas. However, the Peters Land Company gave them deeds to only 320 acres of land in Denton County, Texas near what became Dallas, Texas rather than the million acres of land in the Red River Valley they expected (more than 200 miles away). The first group of emigrants ultimately returned to New Orleans; Cabet came later at the head of a second and smaller band. Neither Texas nor Louisiana proved the looked-for Utopia, and, ravaged by disease, about one-third of the colonists returned to France.

The remainder (142 men, 74 women and 64 children, although 20 died of cholera en route), moved northward along the Mississippi River to Nauvoo, Illinois, where they purchased twelve acres recently vacated by the Mormons in 1849. Cabet was unanimously elected leader, for a one-year term. The improved location enabled the experiment to develop into a successful agricultural community. Education and culture were highly valued by members. By 1855, the Nauvoo Icarian community had expanded to about 500 members with a solid agricultural base, as well as shops, three schools, flour and sawmills, a whiskey distillery, English and French newspapers, a 39 piece orchestra, choir, theater, hospital and the state's largest library (4000 volumes). Members met on Saturdays to discuss community affairs and problems, with universal male suffrage; women were allowed to speak but not vote. On Sundays members talked about ethical and moral issues, but there were no denominational religious services, only members had espoused Christianity before joining the community. Based on this success, some even considered expanding the community 200 miles west to Adair County, Iowa.

However, Cabet was forced to return to France in May 1851 to settle charges of fraud brought up by his previous followers in Europe. Although found not guilty by a French jury in July 1851, when Cabet returned to Nauvoo in July 1852, the community had changed. Some men were using tobacco and abusing alcohol, many women were adorning themselves with fancy dresses and jewelry, and families claimed land as private property. Cabet responded by issuing "Forty-Eight Rules of Conduct" on November 23, 1853, forbidding "tobacco, hard liquor, complaints about the food, and hunting and fishing 'for pleasure'" as well as demanding absolute silence in workshops and submission to him. Some described him as authoritarian or emotionally unstable; internal problems arose and worsened.

In the spring of 1855, Cabet tried to revise the colony's constitution to make him president for life, but was instead relieved of the presidency, so his followers went out on strike, and were in turn temporarily barred from the communal dining hall. Although the colony by then had 526 members and 57 more across the Mississippi River at Montrose, Iowa, it was suffering economically—dependent upon money brought by new members and subsidies from the "Le Populaire" home office in France.

Moreover, split regarding the work division and food distribution worsened during the summer and following year. Cabet published his final book, Colonie icarienne aux États-Unis d'Amérique (1856), but that failed to solve the internal problems. In October 1856, about 180 supporters and Cabet left Nauvoo in three groups for New Bremen, Missouri near St. Louis, Missouri.

== Death and legacy ==
Cabet suffered a stroke on November 8, 1856, a few days after moving to Missouri with the last group of his followers, and soon died. He was buried at the Old Picker's Cemetery, but his remains were moved during construction of a high school on the site, and now rest at New Saint Marcus Cemetery and Mausoleum in Affton, St. Louis County, Missouri, with a gravestone funded by the French Embassy.

On February 15, 1858, the remaining Icarians settled in Cheltenham on the western edge of St. Louis, under the leadership of a lawyer named Mercadier, whom Cabet had designated as his successor. That colony would disband in 1864 (with several young men fighting in the American Civil War) and two families rejoined the Icarians in Corning, Iowa discussed below (the Cheltenham area became a neighborhood within St. Louis). Before his death, Cabet sued the Nauvoo Icarians in a local court, as well as petitioned the Illinois legislature to repeal the act that incorporated the community. The Nauvoo colony relocated to Corning, Adams County, Iowa, about 80 miles southwest of Des Moines, Iowa between 1858 and 1860, because of Illinois crop failures as well as the end of financial support from France following the Panic of 1857. The Corning Icarians prospered until another factional split in 1878, prompted by new emigrants from France, who left to establish a community in Cloverdale, California in 1883 (but "Icaria Speranza" lasted only four years). The colony at Corning disbanded in 1898, but by that time it had existed for 46 years, making it the longest non-religious communal living experiment in American history.

The library at Western Illinois University has a Center for Icarian Studies, as well as Icarian archives and papers. The Nauvoo Historical Society also has some papers and artifacts on display, and some in the town remember the Icarians during the Labor Day Grape Festival, through a historical play. The connection with grape cultivation is more symbolic than foundational, as the growing of Concord grapes in the Nauvoo area did not begin with the Icarians. It sprang from efforts by a French Catholic priest in the 1830s, and expanded in 1846 when Swiss vintner John Tanner brought the Norton grape to the area. However, Baxter's Vineyards and Winery was founded by Icarians Emile and Annette Baxter in 1857, and continues as a 5-generation old family business. It is Illinois' oldest winery.
