= Brushy Creek (Saline Creek tributary) =

Stream in the U.S. state of Missouri

Brushy Creek is a stream in southeastern Ste. Genevieve County in the U.S. state of Missouri. It is a tributary of Saline Creek. The headwaters of Brushy Creek are within the Mark Twain National Forest at 37°43′29″N 90°06′13″W and the stream flows northeast to its confluence with Saline Creek about 1.5 miles southwest of the community of Minnith at 37°46′36″N 90°04′17″W at an elevation of 440 feet.

Brushy Creek was so named on account of brush along its course.

== See also ==
- List of rivers of Missouri
