= Minnith, Missouri =

Unincorporated community in Missouri, U.S.

- Unincorporated community
- Location of Ste. Genevieve County, Missouri
- Coordinates: 37°47′53″N 90°03′00″W
- Country: United States
- State: Missouri
- County: Ste. Genevieve
- Township: Beauvais

Minnith is an unincorporated community located in the southern part of Beauvais Township in Sainte Genevieve County, Missouri, United States. The town lies approximately 11 miles south of Ste. Genevieve. It is on the banks of Saline Creek on Missouri Route N.

== Name ==
Minnith was named by Miles A. Gilbert of St. Mary, Missouri, a local judge, because of the abundance of wheat growing in the fields. The name "Minnith" refers to an Ammonite town mentioned in the Bible.
