= The Voyage to Icaria =

1840 novel by Étienne Cabet

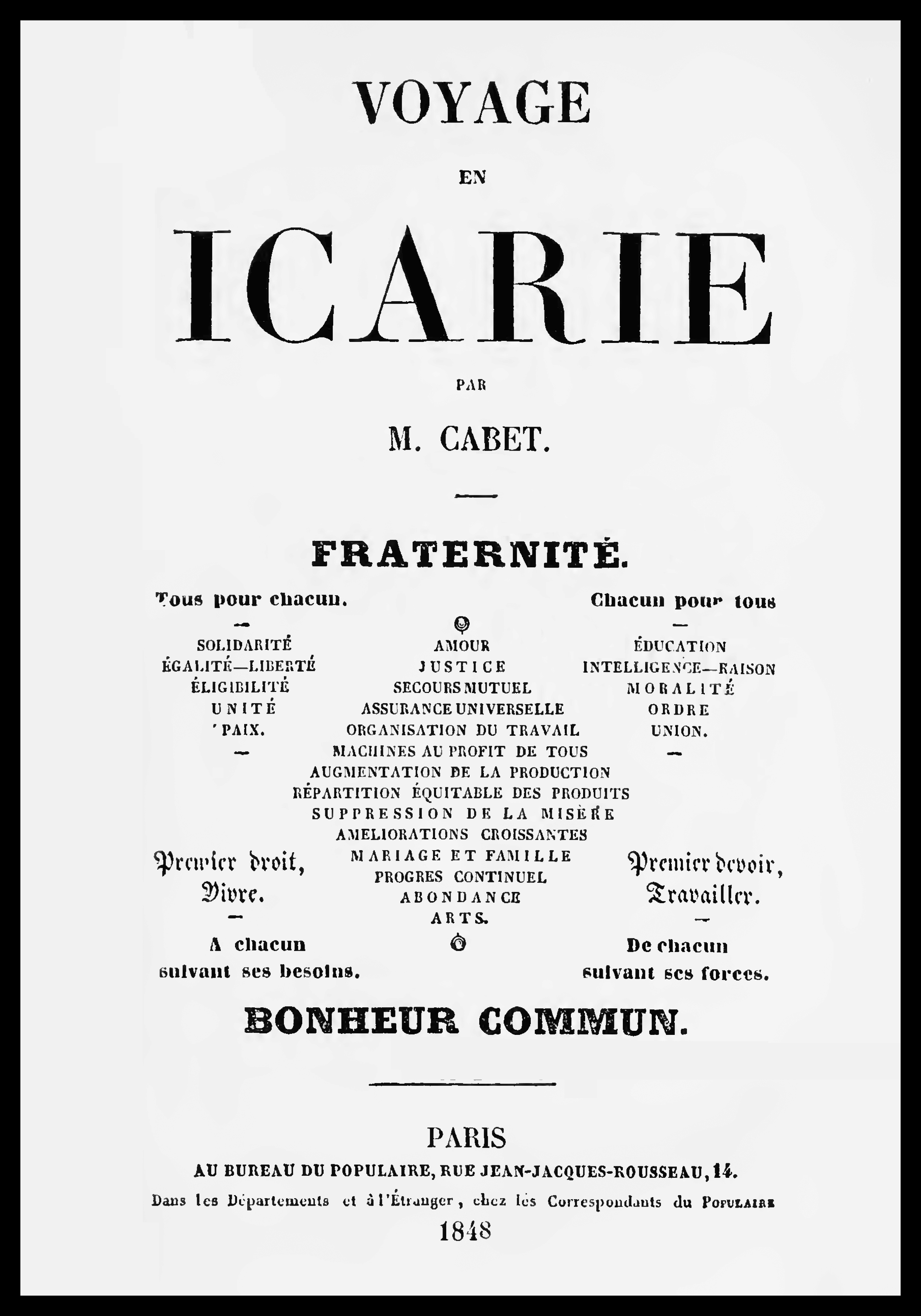
- Author: Étienne Cabet
- Original title: Voyage en Icarie
- Genre: Science fiction
- Publication date: 1840
- Publication place: France

The Voyage to Icaria (French: Voyage en Icarie [vwajaʒ ɑ̃n ikaʁi]) is a novel written by Étienne Cabet and published in 1840. In this romance, he described a communistic utopia, whose terms he had dreamed out; and he began at once to try to realize his dream. He framed a constitution for an actual Icaria. The Icarians were a French utopian movement, founded by Étienne Cabet, who led his followers to America where they established a group of egalitarian communes during the period from 1848 through 1898. Karl Marx mentions Voyage en Icarie in an 1843 letter to Arnold Ruge, contrasting the "communist utopia" of the book with the real and pragmatic conditions necessary for building socialism in the Germany of his time.
