= Beauvais Township, Ste. Genevieve County, Missouri =

Beauvais Township
- Civil Township
- Location of Ste. Genevieve County
- Coordinates: 37°50′08″N 90°03′53″W
- Country: United States
- State: Missouri
- County: Ste. Genevieve
- Established

Area
  - Total: 81.4 sq mi (211 km^{2})
  - Land: 81.1 sq mi (210 km^{2})
  - Water: 0.3 sq mi (0.78 km^{2}) 0.95%
- GNIS Feature ID: 767324

Beauvais Township is a subdivision of Ste. Genevieve County, Missouri, in the United States of America, and is one of the five townships located in Ste. Genevieve County.

== Name ==
The township was named in honor of Jean Baptiste St. Gemme Beauvais, an official of the county.

== History ==
Beauvais Township is a township in Ste. Genevieve, County, Missouri. The township was formed in 1832 from parts of Saline and Ste. Genevieve Townships.

== Populated places ==
There are two towns in Beauvais Township, with a population of 543. Approximately 1,246 people live in the remaining area of the township.

- Minnith
- River aux Vases
- Ozora

The township also contains three churches: Saints Phillip and James Catholic Church, Saline Baptist Church, and Sacred Heart Catholic Church, as well as the following cemeteries: Mange, Hand, Brown, Roth, Saint Marys, and Voekler.

== Geography ==
Beauvais Township is located in the southeastern section of Ste. Genevieve County. A number of streams run through the township: Johns Creek, Bluff Creek, Walnut Creek, Tube Creek, River aux Vases, Saline Creek, Brushy Creek, Idlewild Slough, and Mitchel Slough. Lakes and reservoirs in the township include: Cedar Valley Lake, Donze Lake, Minnehaha Lake, Kisco Lake, Foerster Lake, Lake Minnie Ha-Ha Lower, Lake Minnie Ha-Ha Upper, and Salt Petre Lake.

== 2000 census ==
The 2000 census shows Beauvais township consisting of 810 housing units with a population of 1,800 individuals.

=== 2010 census ===
As of the census of 2010, there were 1,789 people, with a population density of 22.1 per square mile (68.6 km2), residing in the township. The racial makeup of the town was 97.32% White, 1.06% African American, 0.56% Native American and Alaska Native, 0.11% Asian, and 0.22% from other races, and 0.73% from two or more races.
