= River aux Vases (Mississippi River tributary) =

River aux Vases Creek
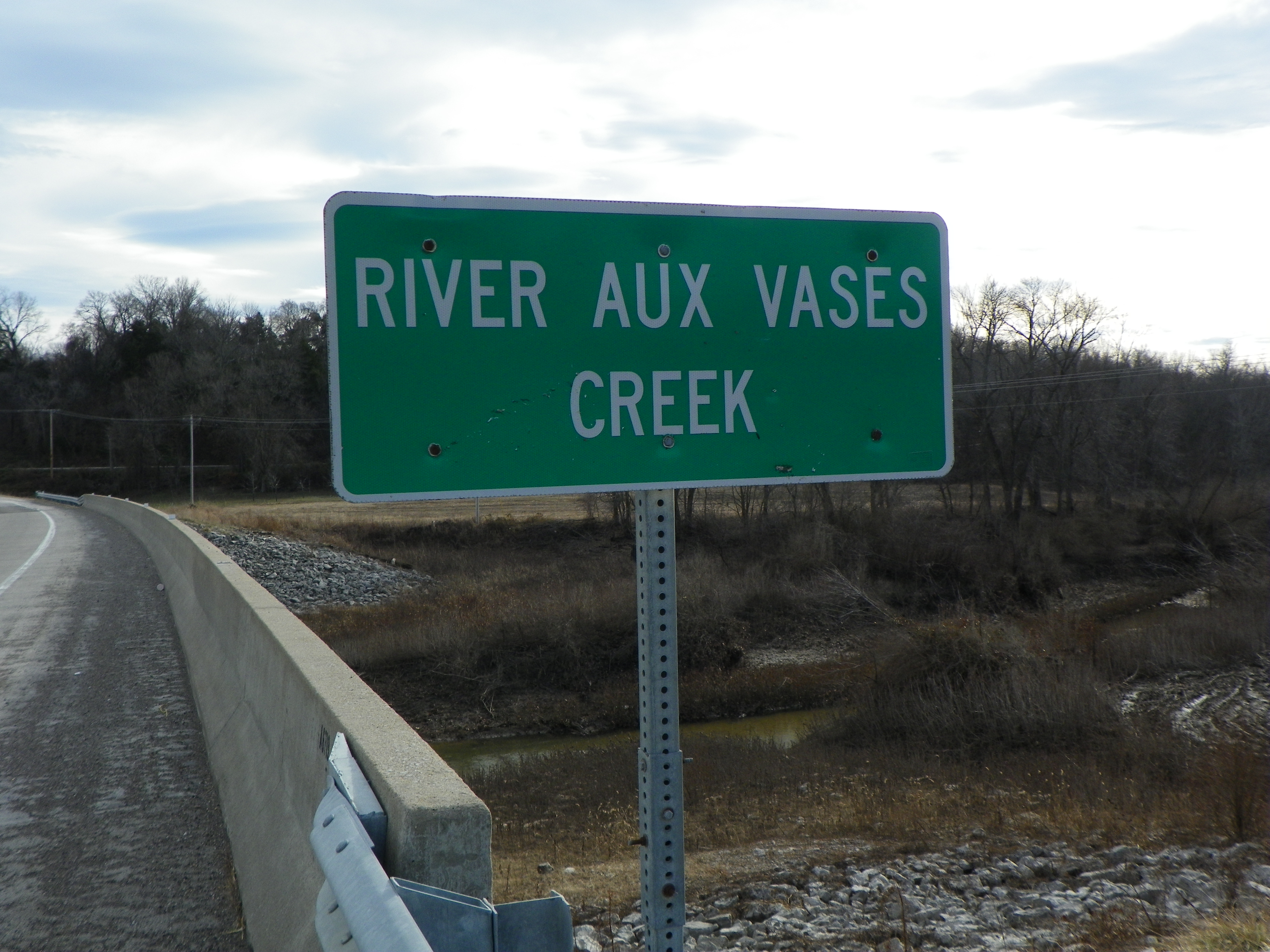
- River aux Vases Creek sign at Highway 61

- River aux Vases Creek within Missouri River aux Vases (Mississippi River tributary) (the United States)
- Etymology: French: La Rivière aux Vases meaning "Muddy" or "Swampy River".

Location
- Country: United States
- State: Missouri

Physical characteristics
- Source
  - location: Ste. Genevieve County, MO
- Mouth: Mississippi River
  - location: La Saline, MO
  - coordinates: 37°54′23″N 89°58′31″W
  - elevation: 361 ft (110 m)
- Basin size: 47.8 sq mi (124 km^{2})

River aux Vases is a creek that rises in Union Township in western Ste. Genevieve County, Missouri and flows into the Mississippi River about two miles north of St. Marys, Missouri.

== Etymology ==
The stream's original name - La Rivière aux Vases - is French meaning The muddy or swampy River and referred to quicksand and soggy conditions around the creek, especially crossings.

== History ==
The earliest French colonial families had long-established family sugar camps (les sucreries) along the creek to process sugar. In 1797 the younger son of Pierre de Lassus, Commandant of New Bourbon received a grant by the Spanish government to establish a sugar mill along the creek. Over time the area around River aux Vases became known as a breeding center for mules. Mining was also prominent in the area and River aux Vases sandstone was used in the abutments of Eads Bridge in downtown St. Louis, with decorative onyx and limestone quarried nearby.

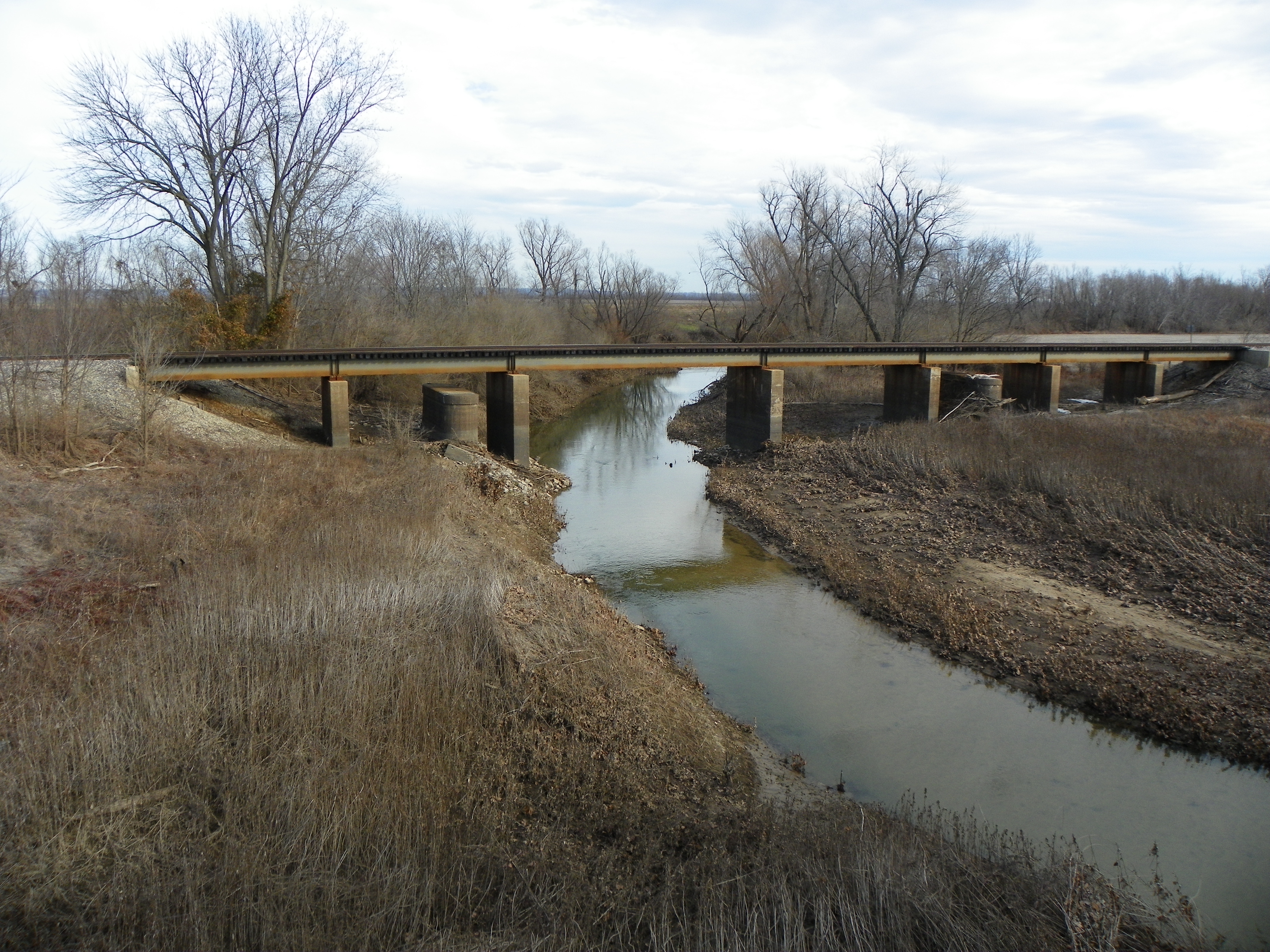
Rail bridge

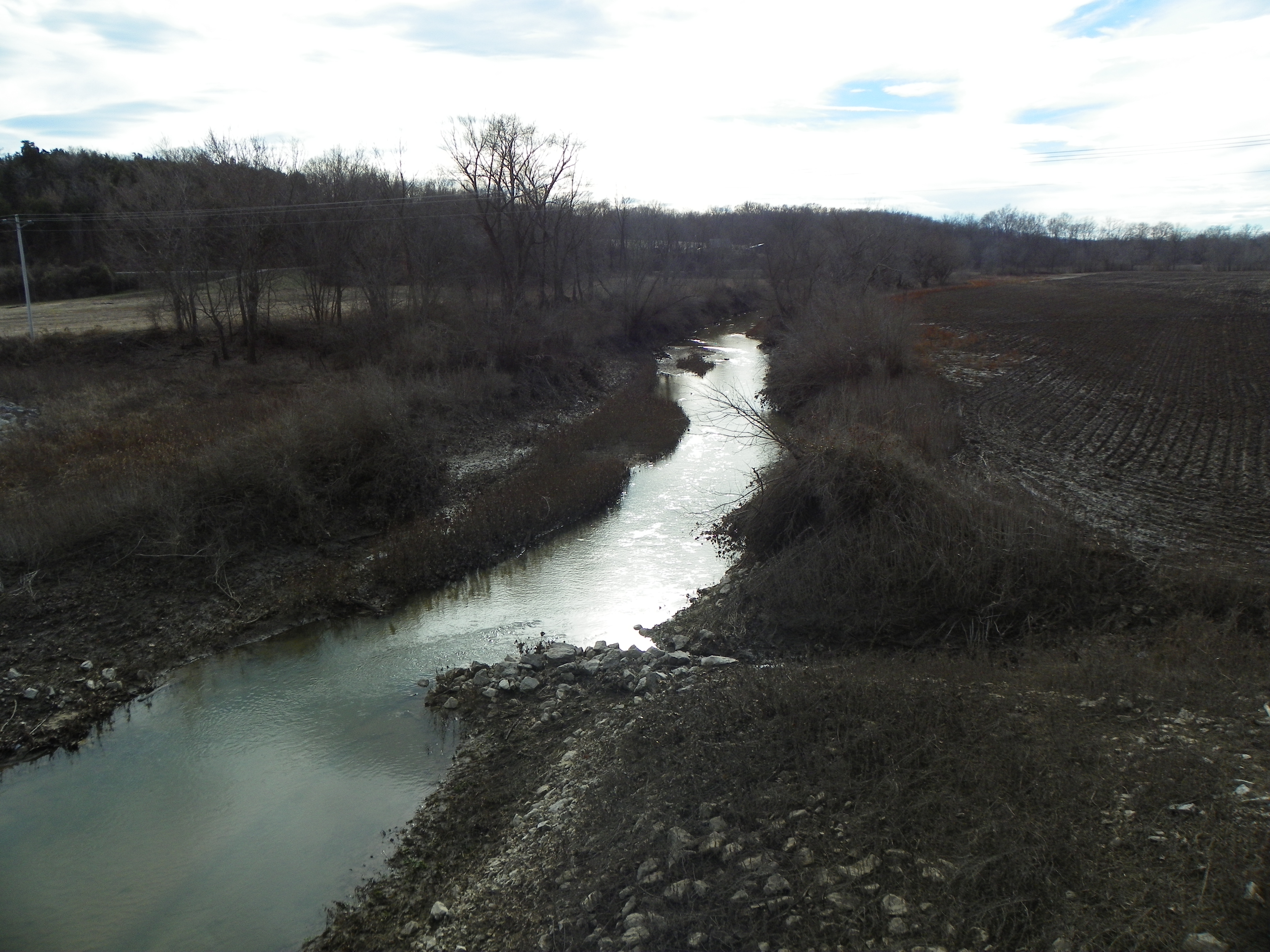
River aux Vases Creek

== Physical geography ==
River aux Vases rises near Jonca in Union Township in the western part of Ste. Genevieve County, and flows east through Hawn State Park and empties into the Mississippi River about two miles north of St. Mary at an elevation of 361 feet. It has a watershed of 47.8 sq. mi.

- Dodge Creek
- Flint Bottom Creek
- Jonca Creek
- Lake Kal-Tatri
- Mill Creek
- Pickle Creek
- Rainbow Lake

== Cultural geography ==
There are a number of communities along River aux Vases Creek, most notably the community by the same name River aux Vases, as well as New Bremen (Ozora), and New Tennessee.

Bridges that converse River aux Vases Creek include the River aux Vases Bridge on Old Kingshighway (Highway 61), the River aux Vases Route B Bridge, The Interstate 55 Bridge, and the River aux Vases US 61 Bridge.
