= Madden Creek =

Stream in the American state of Missouri

Coordinates: 37.7822755°N 90.1145605°W

Madden Creek is a stream in Ste. Genevieve County in the U.S. state of Missouri. It is a tributary of Saline Creek.

Madden Creek has the name of Thomas Madden, an early settler.

== See also ==
- List of rivers of Missouri
