= Coldwater Creek (Saline Creek tributary) =

Stream in the U.S. state of Missouri

Coordinates: 37.7606087°N 90.1334500°W

Coldwater Creek is a stream in Ste. Genevieve County in the U.S. state of Missouri. It is a tributary of Saline Creek.

Coldwater Creek was named for the fact it is impregnated with cold spring water.

== See also ==
- List of rivers of Missouri
