= Mill Creek (River aux Vases tributary) =

Stream in the American state of Missouri

Coordinates: 37.871442°N 90.093448°W

Mill Creek is a stream in Ste. Genevieve County in the U.S. state of Missouri. It is a tributary of River aux Vases.

Mill Creek was named for the mills lining its banks.

== See also ==
- List of rivers of Missouri
