= Sacred Heart Roman Catholic Church (Ozora, Missouri) =

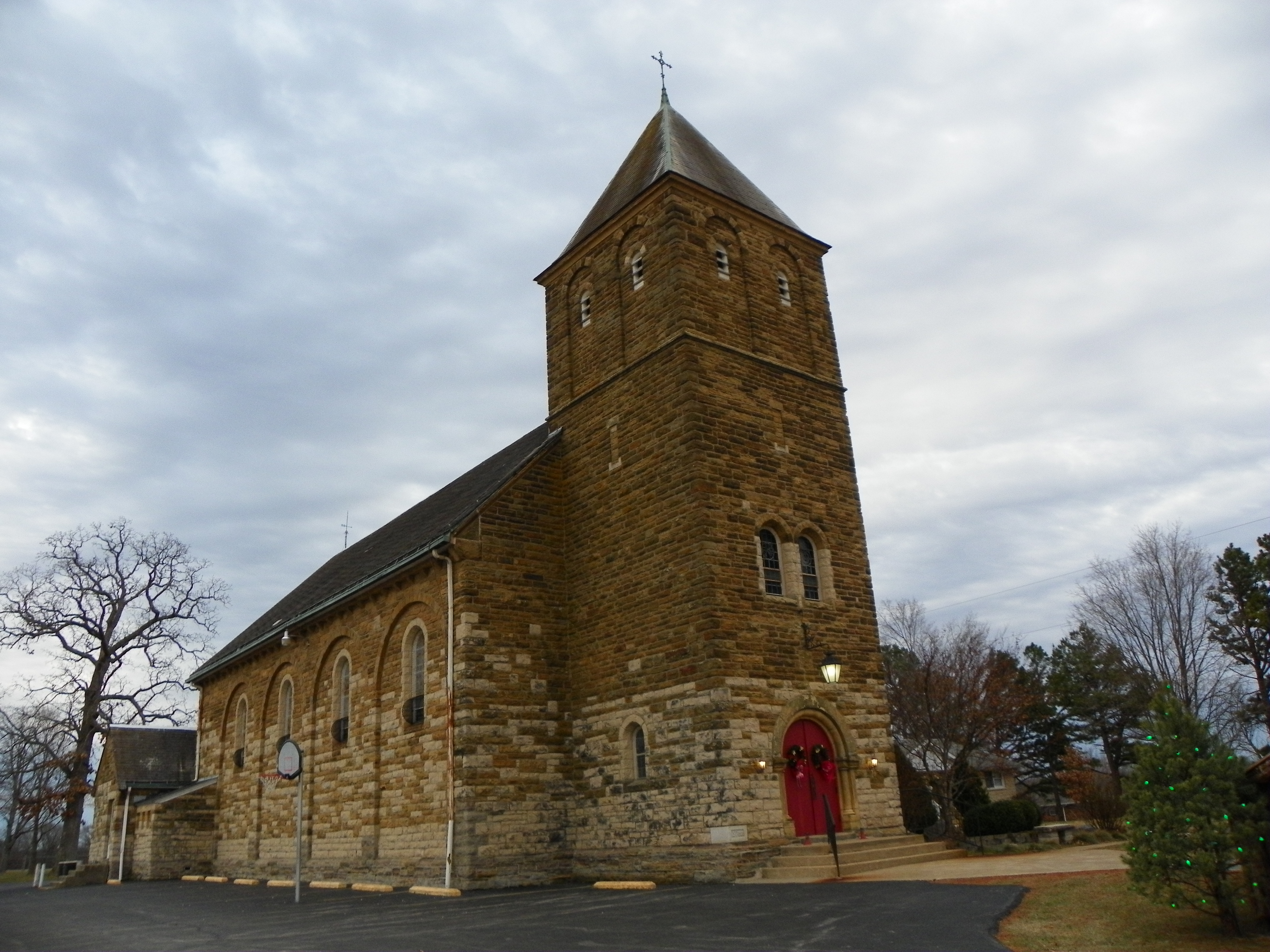

- Location within Missouri
- 37°51′52″N 90°02′04″W
- Location: 17742 State Route N Ozora, Missouri
- Country: United States
- Denomination: Roman Catholic Church
- Website: archstl.org/parish/sacred-heart-ozora

History
- Founded: 1899

Specifications
- Length: 110 ft (34 m)
- Width: 40 ft (12 m)

Administration
- Archdiocese: Archdiocese of St. Louis
- Deanery: Ste. Genevieve

Clergy
- Archbishop: Most Rev. Robert Carlson

Sacred Heart Roman Catholic Church is a Roman Catholic Church in Ozora in Ste. Genevieve County, Missouri.

== History ==
The parish was formed in 1899.
