= Greasy Creek (Saline River tributary) =

Stream in the U.S. state of Missouri

Coordinates: 37.7367194°N 90.1792846°W

Location
- Country: United States
- State: Missouri
- County: Ste. Genevieve County

Physical characteristics
- Source
  - location: Missouri
- Mouth: Saline Creek

Greasy Creek is a stream in Ste. Genevieve County in the U.S. state of Missouri. It is a tributary of Saline Creek.

Greasy Creek was so named on account of its greasy (or muddy) water.

== See also ==
- List of rivers of Missouri
