= Saint Johns Creek =

Saint Johns Creek may refer to:

- Saint Johns Creek (Missouri)
- Saint Johns Creek (Pennsylvania)
