= Johns Creek (Little Lost Creek tributary) =

Stream in the US state of Missouri

Johns Creek is a stream in Washington County in the U.S. state of Missouri. It is a tributary of Little Lost Creek.

The stream headwaters are at 37°51′26″N 90°56′50″W and its confluence with the Little Lost Creek is at 37°54′13″N 91°00′17″W.

The namesake of Johns Creek is unknown.

== See also ==
- List of rivers of Missouri
