= Johns Creek (Jackson County, North Carolina) =

Stream in North Carolina, USA

Johns Creek Tributary to Caney Fork
- Location of Johns Creek mouth Johns Creek (Jackson County, North Carolina) (the United States)

Location
- Country: United States
- State: North Carolina
- County: Jackson

Physical characteristics
- Source: Sugar Creek divide
  - location: about 0.5 miles southwest of Sam Queens Gap
  - coordinates: 35°17′43″N 083°03′22″W
  - elevation: 3,420 ft (1,040 m)
- Mouth: Caney Fork
  - location: about 1 mile southeast of Cowarts, North Carolina
  - coordinates: 35°17′30″N 083°06′08″W
  - elevation: 2,270 ft (690 m)
- Length: 3.96 mi (6.37 km)
- Basin size: 4.36 square miles (11.3 km^{2})
- Discharge
  - location: Caney Fork
  - average: 10.73 cu ft/s (0.304 m^{3}/s) at mouth with Caney Fork

Basin features
- Progression: generally east
- River system: Tuckasegee River
- Tributaries
  - left: unnamed tributaries
  - right: unnamed tributaries
- Bridges: Whittlers Trail, Johns Creek Road (x4), Rugged Mountain Drive, Johns Creek Road, Log Cabin Lane, Cabin View Lane, Johns Creek Road, Brown Mountain Drive, Johns Creek Road, Nicholson Cove Road, Caney Fork Road

Johns Creek is a stream in Jackson County, in the U.S. state of North Carolina.

The stream derives its name from Chief John, a Native American.

== See also ==
- List of rivers of North Carolina
