= River aux Vases, Missouri =

Unincorporated community in Missouri, U.S.

Coordinates: 37°52′20″N 90°06′46″W

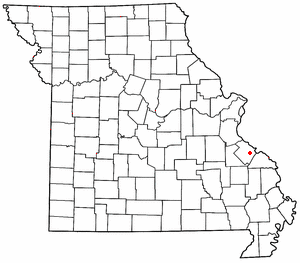

River aux Vases is an unincorporated community in Beauvais Township in Sainte Genevieve County, Missouri, United States.

== Etymology ==
The community, also known as "the French Village", was established in the early 1800s and originally called Rivière aux Vases, named after the nearby creek River aux Vases. Aux vases is French for "swamps" or "morasses". The community was also known as Staabtown in the past.

== History ==
The Roman Catholic parish "Saints Philip and James" was founded in 1840. From 1896 to 1892, scholar and church historian Frederick George Holweck served as rector.

In 1875 Charles Staab opened a store, and the town built around his store. Mr. Staab was postmaster from 1879 until 1924, whereupon his son took over the job as postmaster.

In the past River aux Vases was a breeding center for mules. Mining was also prominent in the area and River aux Vases sandstone was used in the abutments of Eads Bridge in downtown St. Louis, with decorative onyx and limestone quarried nearby.

== Geography ==
The community is located just south of the River aux Vases, along Missouri Route B. It is approximately ten miles southwest of Sainte Genevieve in Beauvais Township, and approximately 64 miles south of St. Louis.
