= Johns Creek (Saline Creek tributary) =

Stream in the U.S. state of Missouri

Coordinates: 37.7783869°N 90.0806707°W

Johns Creek is a stream in Ste. Genevieve County in the U.S. state of Missouri. It is a tributary of Saline Creek.

Johns Creek has the name of the local John family.

== See also ==
- List of rivers of Missouri
