= St. Mary, Missouri =

City in Ste. Genevieve County, Missouri, United States

- City
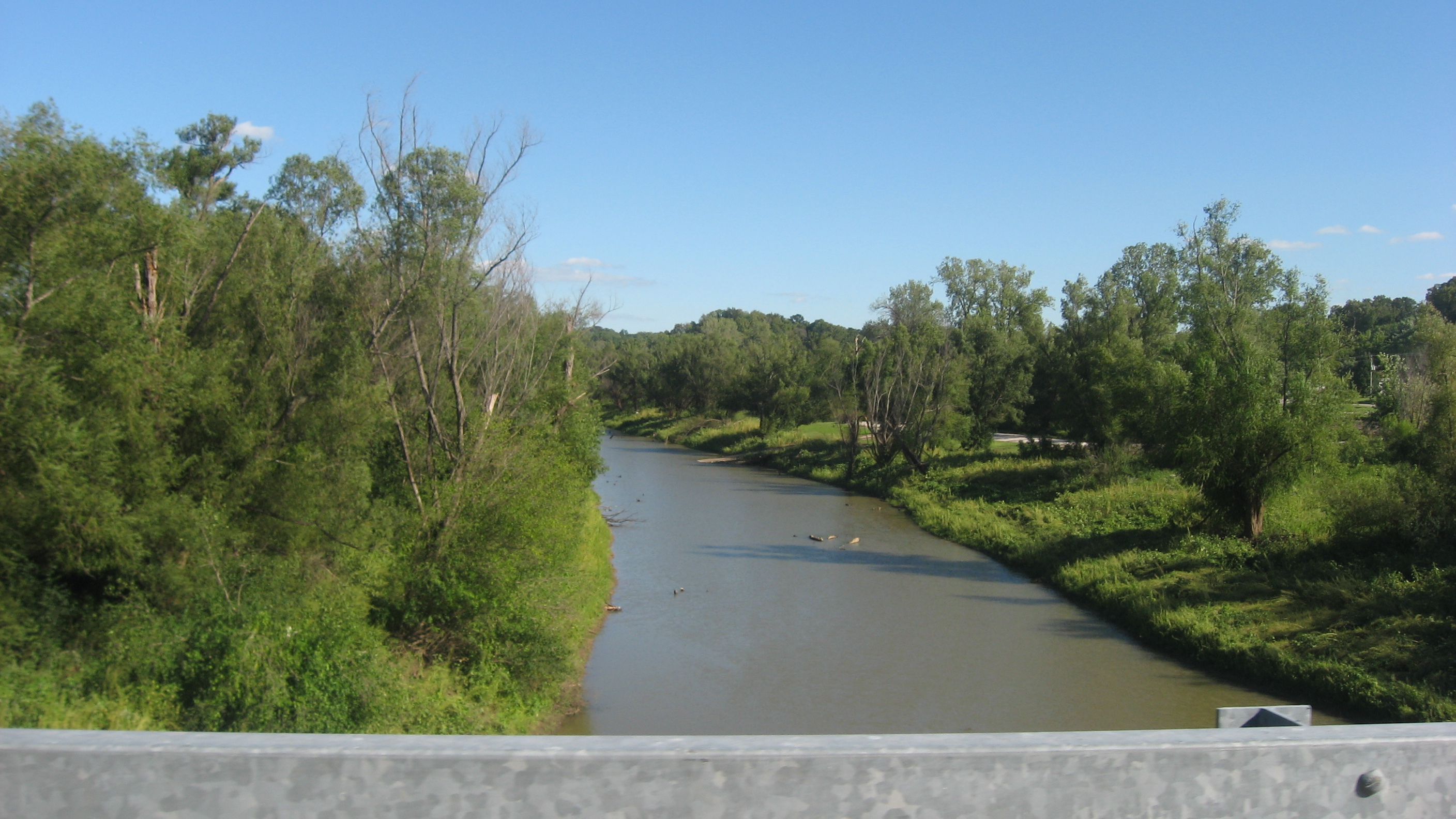
- The old Mississippi River bed at St. Mary, now just a small stream

- Location of St. Mary, Missouri
- Coordinates: 37°52′34″N 89°56′58″W
- Country: United States
- State: Missouri
- County: Ste. Genevieve

Area
  - Total: 0.61 sq mi (1.58 km^{2})
  - Land: 0.60 sq mi (1.55 km^{2})
  - Water: 0.0077 sq mi (0.02 km^{2})
- Elevation: 459 ft (140 m)

Population (2020)
  - Total: 309
  - Density: 515.6/sq mi (199.08/km^{2})
- Time zone: UTC-6 (Central (CST))
  - Summer (DST): UTC-5 (CDT)
- FIPS code: 29-65034
- GNIS feature ID: 2396504
- Website: cityofstmarymo.com

St. Mary is a city in Ste. Genevieve County, Missouri, United States. The population was 309 at the 2020 census.

== Name ==
St. Mary had a number of nicknames, including Camp Rowdy and Yankeetown. Eventually, the community came to be known as St. Mary's Landing and then simply as St. Mary's.

== History ==
The small city was established by settlers of French descent, who also built St. Mary's Catholic Church. The city was originally named St. Mary's Landing.

On October 24, 2021, a destructive EF3 tornado tore through the town.

== Geography ==
St. Mary lies in the Grand Champ Bottoms. The community is bordered by Saint Laurent Creek to the south and Saline Creek to the north, with an offshoot of the Mississippi separating it from Kaskaskia Island to the east. According to the United States Census Bureau, the city has a total area of 0.61 square miles (1.58 km^{2}), of which 0.60 square miles (1.55 km^{2}) is land and 0.01 square miles (0.03 km^{2}) is water.

== Demographics ==
Historical population
Census	Pop.	Note	%±
1860	142		—
1870	397		179.6%
1880	419		5.5%
1890	446		6.4%
1900	576		29.1%
1910	702		21.9%
1920	722		2.8%
1930	554		−23.3%
1940	605		9.2%
1950	635		5.0%
1960	620		−2.4%
1970	645		4.0%
1980	565		−12.4%
1990	461		−18.4%
2000	377		−18.2%
2010	360		−4.5%
2020	309		−14.2%
U.S. Decennial Census 2020

=== 2010 census ===
As of the census of 2010, there were 360 people, 159 households, and 89 families living in the city. The population density was 600.0 inhabitants per square mile (231.7/km^{2}). There were 188 housing units at an average density of 313.3 per square mile (121.0/km^{2}). The racial makeup of the city was 91.67% White, 4.72% Black or African American, 0.28% Native American, 0.83% from other races, and 2.50% from two or more races. Hispanic or Latino of any race were 1.94% of the population.

There were 159 households, of which 25.2% had children under the age of 18 living with them, 37.7% were married couples living together, 11.9% had a female householder with no husband present, 6.3% had a male householder with no wife present, and 44.0% were non-families. 35.8% of all households were made up of individuals, and 15.7% had someone living alone who was 65 years of age or older. The average household size was 2.26 and the average family size was 2.93.

The median age in the city was 40.9 years. 25% of residents were under the age of 18; 7.3% were between the ages of 18 and 24; 20.5% were from 25 to 44; 29.5% were from 45 to 64; and 17.8% were 65 years of age or older. The gender makeup of the city was 50.0% male and 50.0% female.

=== 2000 census ===
As of the census of 2000, there were 377 people, 167 households, and 100 families living in the city. The population density was 625.3 inhabitants per square mile (241.4/km^{2}). There were 187 housing units at an average density of 310.2 per square mile (119.8/km^{2}). The racial makeup of the city was 92.84% White, 3.18% African American, 0.80% Native American, 1.59% from other races, and 1.59% from two or more races. Hispanic or Latino of any race were 2.12% of the population.

There were 167 households, out of which 23.4% had children under the age of 18 living with them, 47.9% were married couples living together, 9.0% had a female householder with no husband present, and 40.1% were non-families. 32.3% of all households were made up of individuals, and 15.0% had someone living alone who was 65 years of age or older. The average household size was 2.26 and the average family size was 2.93.

In the city, the population was spread out, with 23.6% under the age of 18, 6.9% from 18 to 24, 27.6% from 25 to 44, 25.5% from 45 to 64, and 16.4% who were 65 years of age or older. The median age was 39 years. For every 100 females, there were 106.0 males. For every 100 females age 18 and over, there were 101.4 males.

The median income for a household in the city was $27,000, and the median income for a family was $31,964. Males had a median income of $34,375 versus $14,583 for females. The per capita income for the city was $16,825. About 7.9% of families and 13.2% of the population were below the poverty line, including 40.0% of those under age 18 and 4.1% of those age 65 or over.

== Notable person ==
- Sonny Siebert, baseball player who pitched for six different teams during his MLB career and was twice an All-Star

== See also ==
- List of cities in Missouri
