= Ozora, Missouri =

Census-designated place in Ste. Genevieve County, Missouri, United States

- Census-designated place
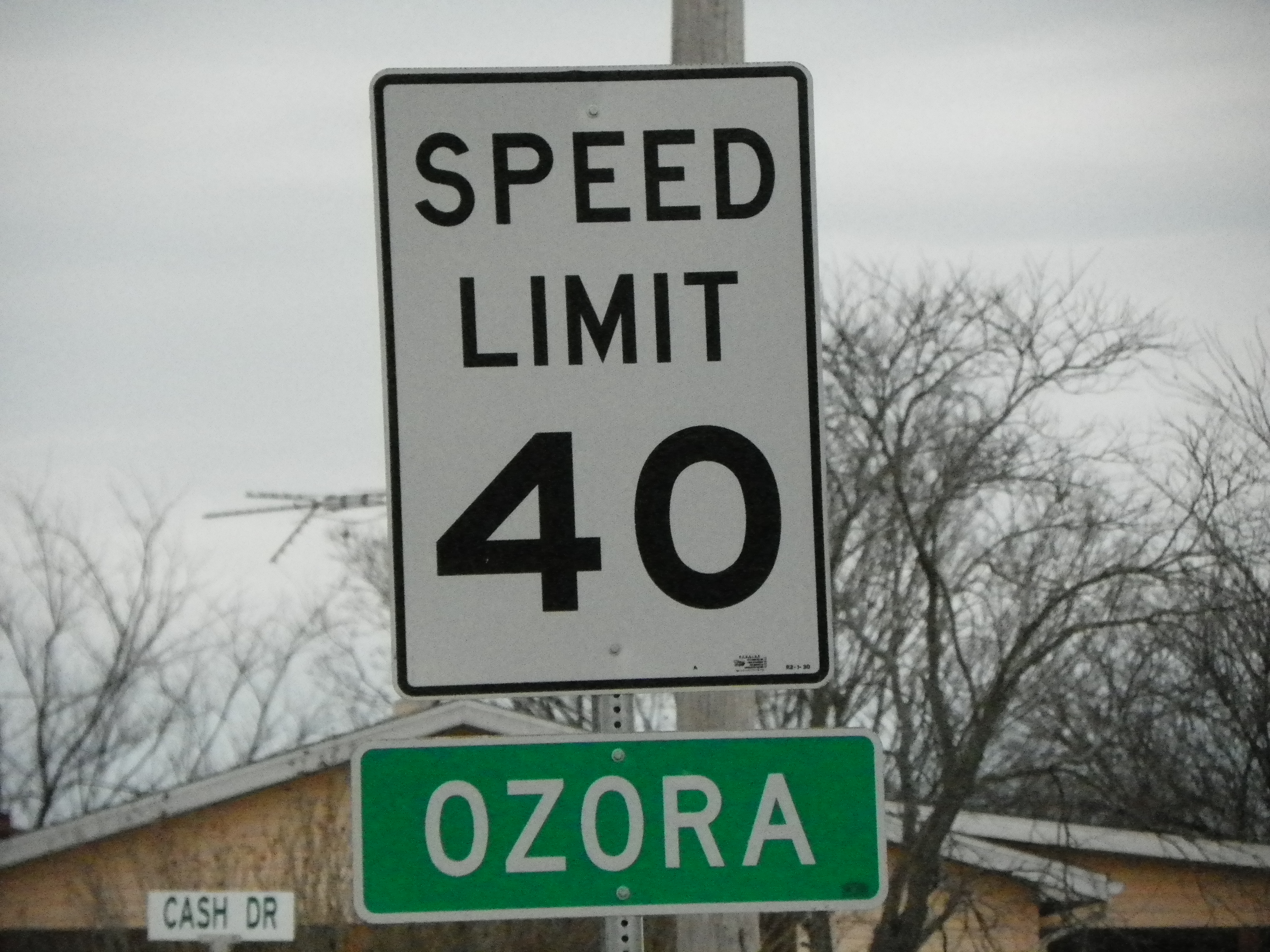
- Ozora, Missouri, road sign

- Location of Ste. Genevieve County, Missouri
- Coordinates: 37°52′51″N 90°03′18″W
- Country: United States
- State: Missouri
- County: Sainte Genevieve
- Township: Beauvais

Area
  - Total: 6.16 sq mi (15.95 km^{2})
  - Land: 6.13 sq mi (15.88 km^{2})
  - Water: 0.031 sq mi (0.08 km^{2})
- Elevation: 577 ft (176 m)

Population (2020)
  - Total: 182
  - Density: 29.7/sq mi (11.46/km^{2})
- Time zone: UTC-6 (Central (CST))
  - Summer (DST): UTC-5 (CDT)
- ZIP code: 63670
- Area code: 573
- FIPS code: 29-55892
- GNIS feature ID: 2587100

Ozora is a census-designated place (CDP) in Beauvais Township, Sainte Genevieve County, Missouri, United States. Ozora is located approximately eight miles (13 km) south of Sainte Genevieve.

== Description ==
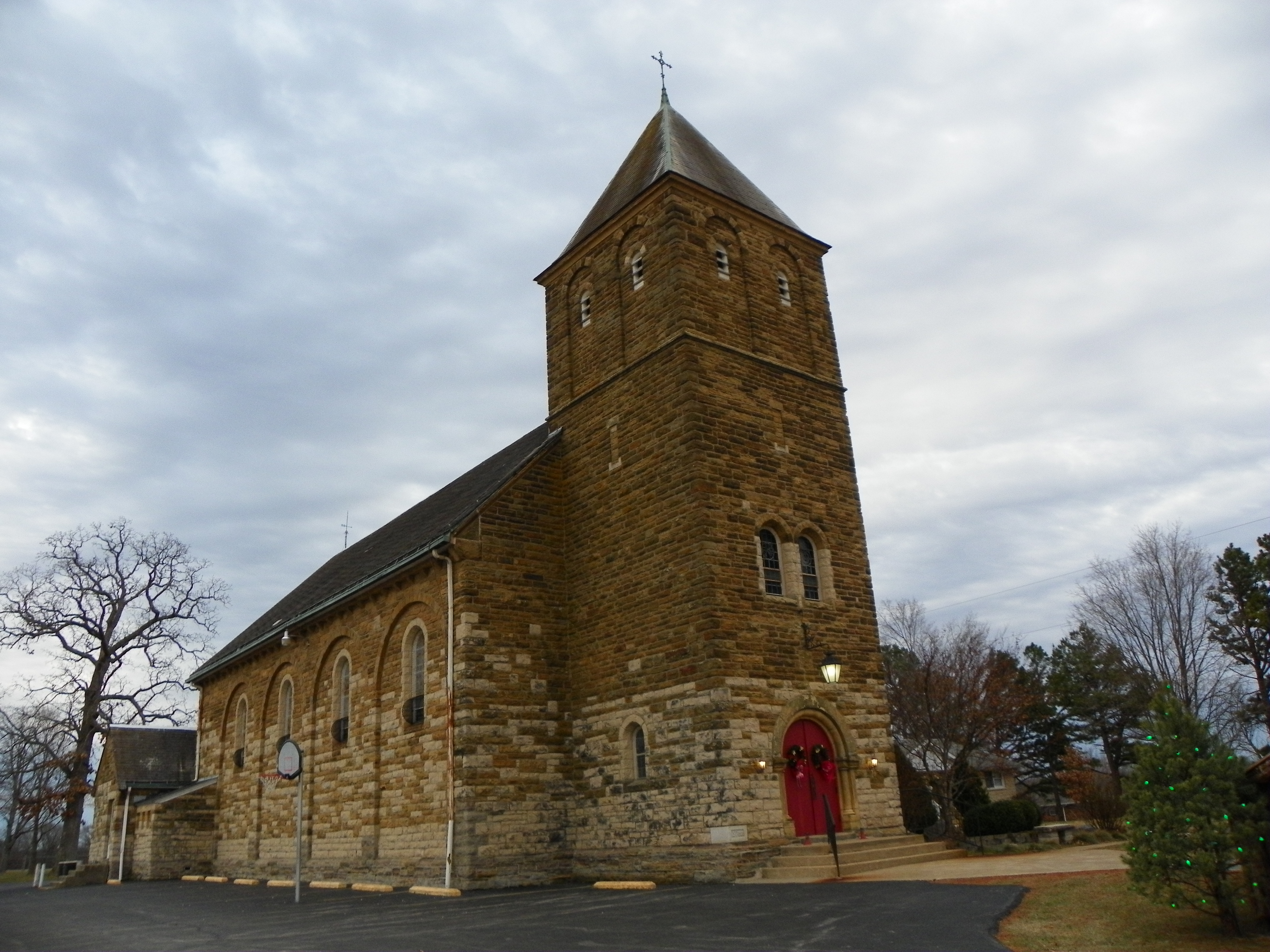
Sacred Heart Roman Catholic Church

Ozora is located approximately one-quarter of a mile from the earlier settlement of New Bremen, which had been settled by Germans and named after the port they had sailed from. In 1901, three names were submitted: New Bremen (because of the nearby community), Ida and Ozark. Since there was already an Ozark post office in Christian County, the name Ozora was coined from the word Ozark.

Ozora is home to the Sacred Heart Catholic Church and a Catholic elementary school.

== Demographics ==
Historical population
Census	Pop.	Note	%±
2020	182		—
U.S. Decennial Census

=== 2010 census ===
As of the census of 2010, there were 183 people, made up of 100 males (54.64%) and 83 females (45.36%). The population density was 29.9 per square mile. The racial makeup of the village was 97.81% White, 1.64% American Indian and Alaska native, and 0.55% from other races.

== See also ==
- List of census-designated places in Missouri
