= Saline Creek (Mississippi River tributary) =

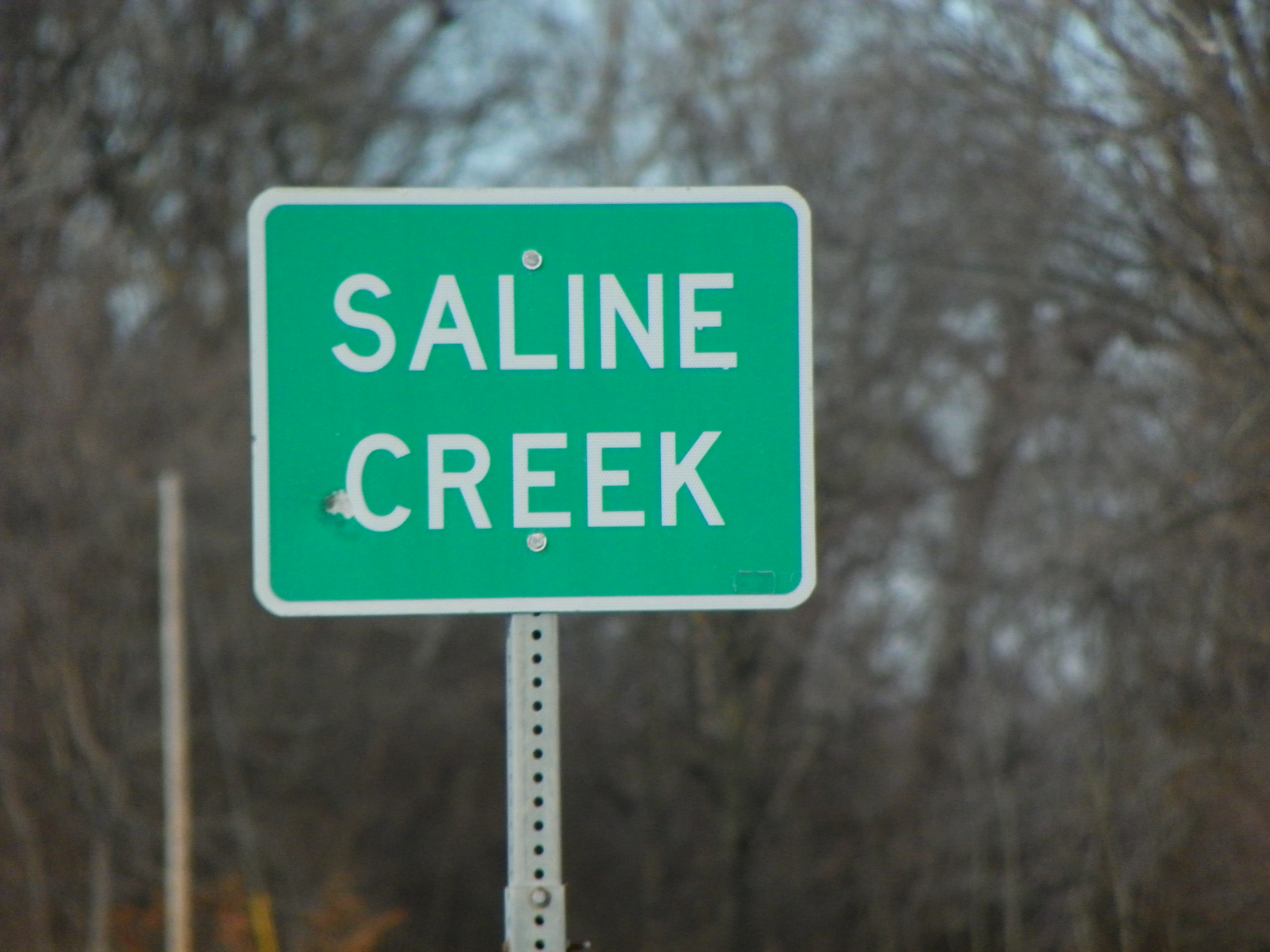
- Saline Creek sign Route 61

- Location within Missouri Location within the United States
- Etymology: French La Saline, meaning 'The Saltworks'

Location
- Country: United States
- State: Missouri

Physical characteristics
- Source
  - location: Perry County, MO
  - coordinates: 37°44′11″N 90°15′02″W
- Mouth: Mississippi River
  - location: La Saline, MO
  - coordinates: 37°54′22″N 89°58′30″W
  - elevation: 367 ft (112 m)
- Basin size: 75 sq mi (190 km^{2})

Saline Creek (/səˈliːn/ sə-LEEN) is a creek that rises in western Ste. Genevieve County and flows east briefly passing through a portion of northern Perry County before emptying into an offshoot of the Mississippi River north of St. Mary across from Kaskaskia Island.

== Etymology ==
The stream's original name - La Rivière de Saline - is French meaning The River of the Saltworks and refers to the two natural salt springs found in the area, which also gave name to the nearby creek and its tributaries called Saline Creek or Saline River. The French colonials knew Saline Creek as La Rivière de la Saline or La Petite Rivière de la Saline. The Spanish referred to the creek and its tributaries as Las Salinas.

== Physical geography ==
Saline Creek rises in western Ste. Genevieve County and flows east briefly passing through a portion of northern Perry County before emptying into an offshoot of the Mississippi River across from Kaskaskia Island, just north of St. Mary’s roughly six miles south of Sainte Genevieve. The confluence is at an elevation of 367 ft. It has a watershed of 75 sq. mi.

A number of tributaries flow into Saline Creek:

- Brushy Creek
- Coldwater Creek
- Greasy Creek
- Johns Creek
- Little Saline Creek
- Madden Creek
- South Fork Saline Creek

== Cultural geography ==
There were two settlements on Saline Creek, La Grande Saline and La Petite Saline, with the former being the larger of the two. La Grande Saline was usually simply referred to as La Saline, and sometimes as Old Saline. Saline Township in Ste. Genevieve County, Missouri and Saline Township in Perry County, Missouri were both named after Saline Creek.

== History ==
In 1541, Spanish explorer De Soto had sent Hernando de Silvera and Pedro Moreno from Capaha, with Indian guides, to obtain a supply of salt from a saline stream to the north, presumably the Saline Creek in Ste. Genevieve County.

Later, during the French colonial period, both French and Illinois Indians came to the site of Saline Creek to get their salt.

The settlement of Saline Creek began in the early 1700s. In 1715, a small party of French were reported to be making salt at La Saline. This early encampment on Saline Creek was temporary, but over time became permanent. Two settlements grew up along Saline Creek: Grande Saline, located near the mouth of the creek, and Petite Saline, located at the upper end of the creek, along a tributary. The purpose of the settlement was the manufacturing of salt which was used for meat preservation, skin tanning, and fur processing. Water from the salt springs was boiled in ovens the French built; when the water boiled away, the salt remained. French Colonial authorities also set up a post at La Saline in 1788. By 1800, French and Americans (Kentuckians) extracting salt from Saline Creek had set up four or five furnaces used for boiling off the salt for extraction, earning Saline Creek the name La Saline Ensanglantèe (The Bloody Saline). These men were sending approximately thirty-five hundred barrels of salt to New Orleans each year.

As well as producing salt, La Saline's location along the Mississippi River meant that it served as a lead-shipping point. Lead from Mine la Motte, opened in the 1720s, came by animal or cart over ridge roads and then down the Saline River Valley to its mouth at La Saline to be loaded on Mississippi River boats.

In 1822, some seventeen workers were still using 100-150 kettles to extract salt, but by 1825, all production had ceased.

== Gallery ==
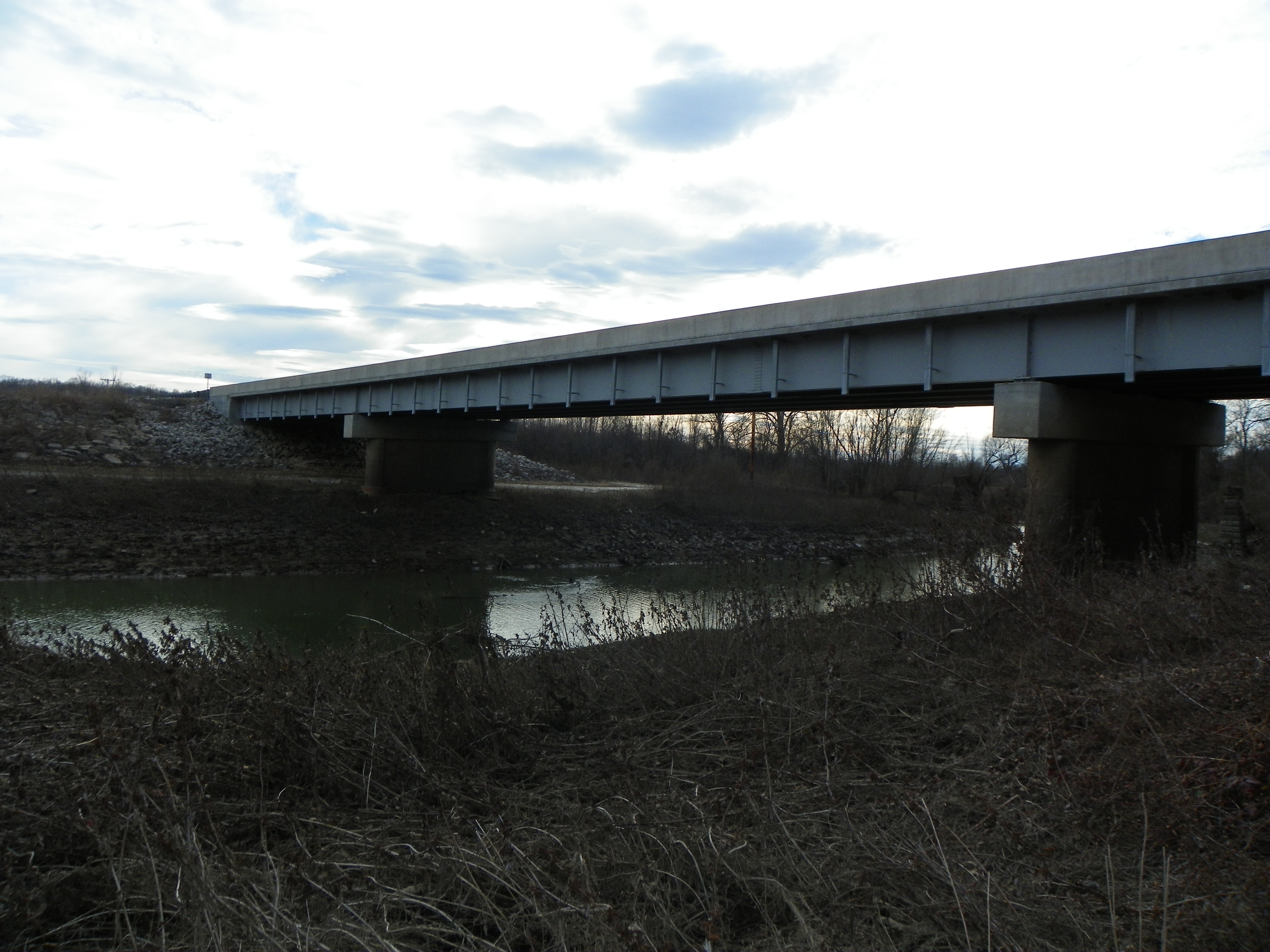
Highway 61 Bridge

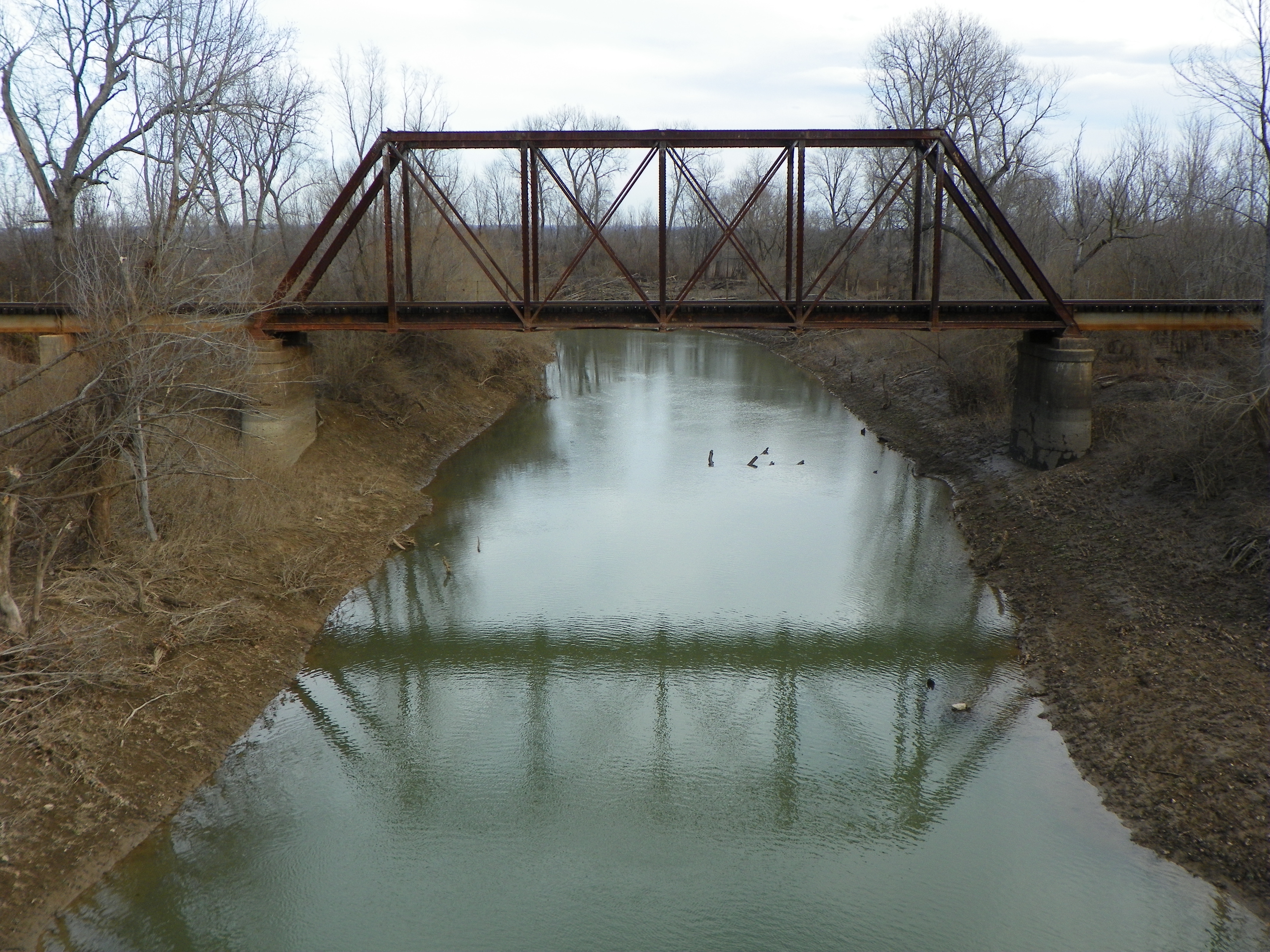
Railroad Bridge

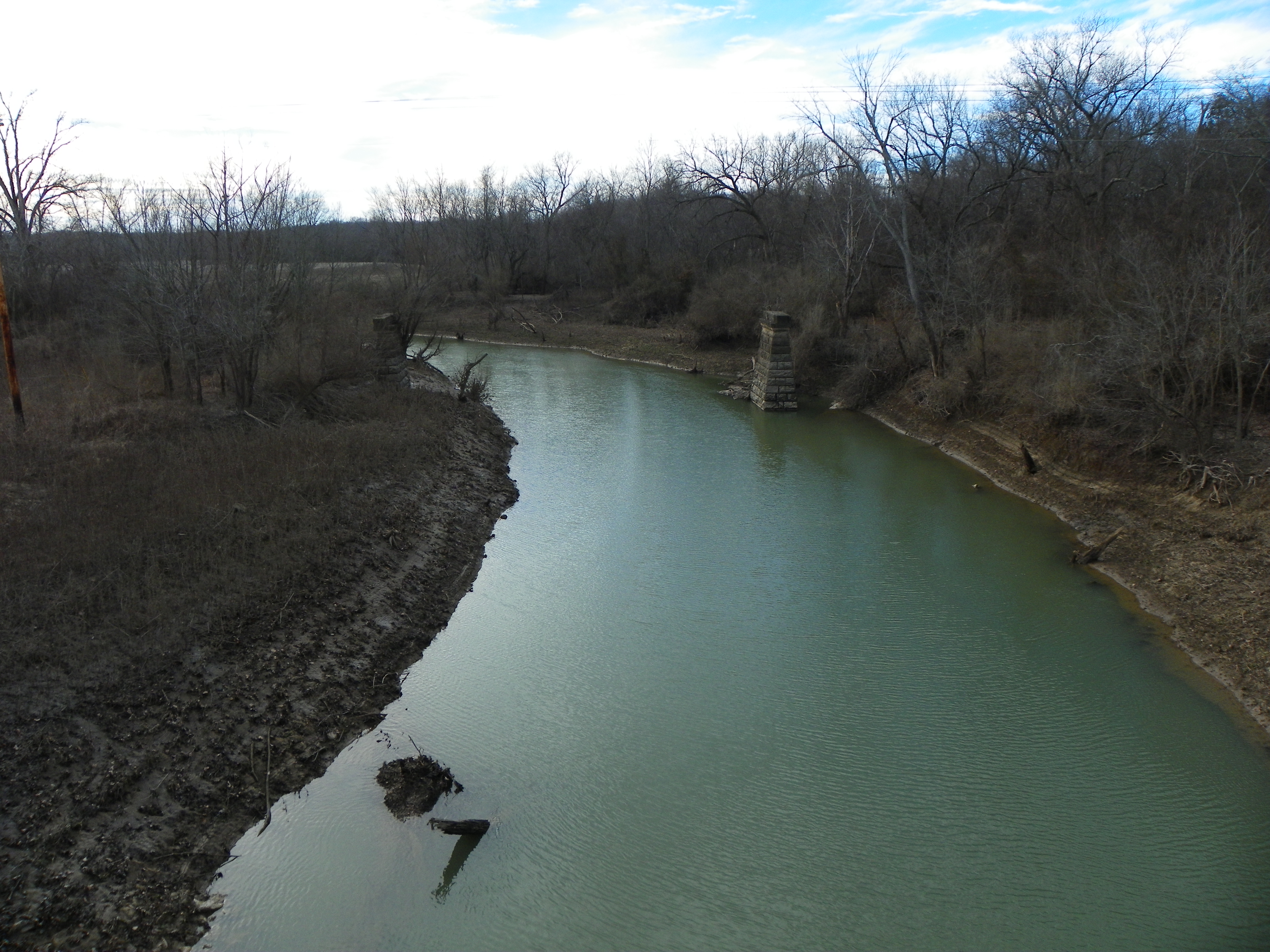
Saline Creek
