= St. Francois Mountains =

Mountain range in Missouri, U.S.

Saint Francois Mountains
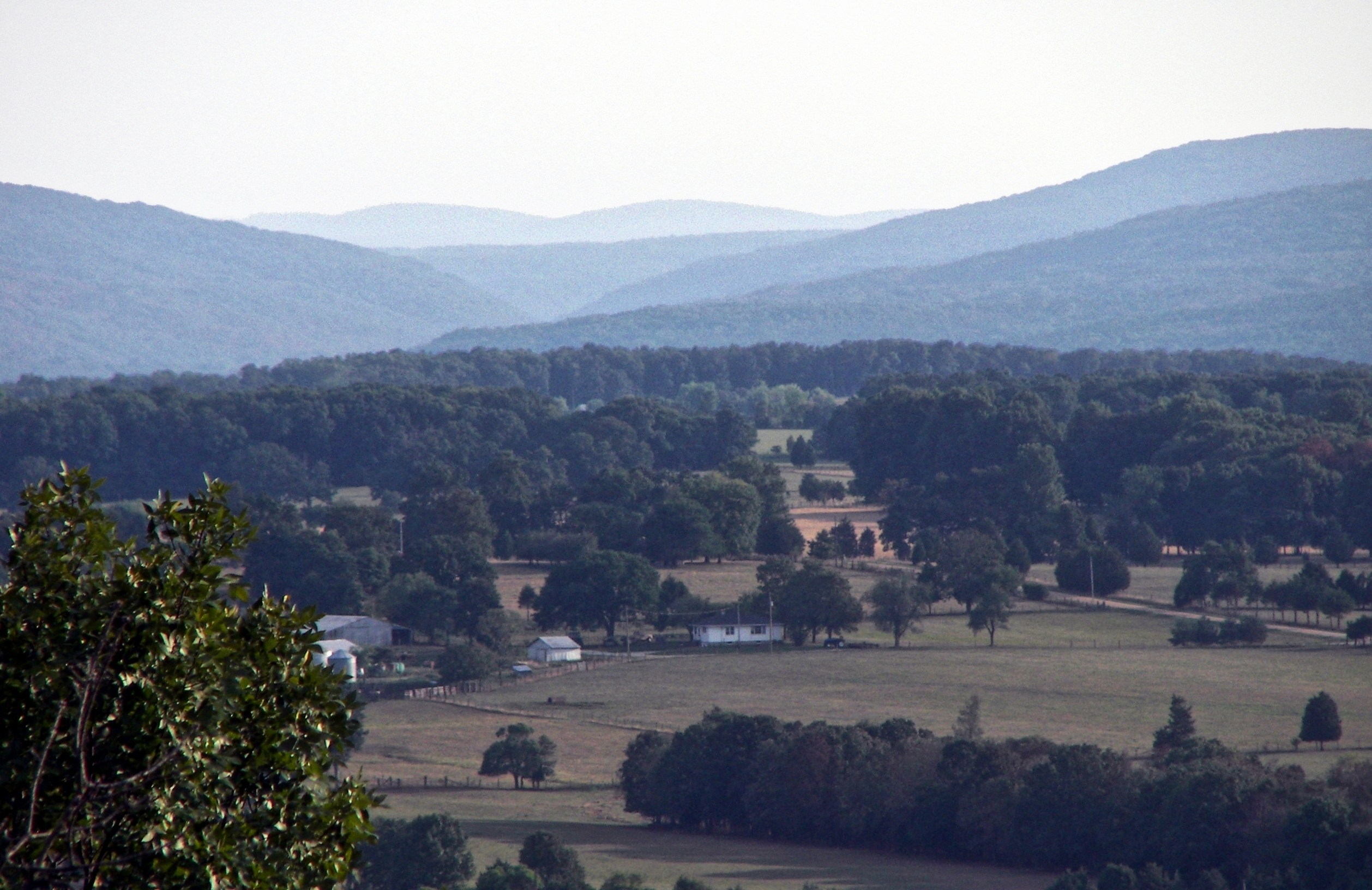
- A view towards the St. Francois range from Knob Lick Mountain, a granite and rhyolite knob on the edge of the range

Highest point
- Peak: Taum Sauk Mountain
- Elevation: 1,772 ft (540 m)
- Coordinates: 37°34′13″N 90°43′40″W

Geography
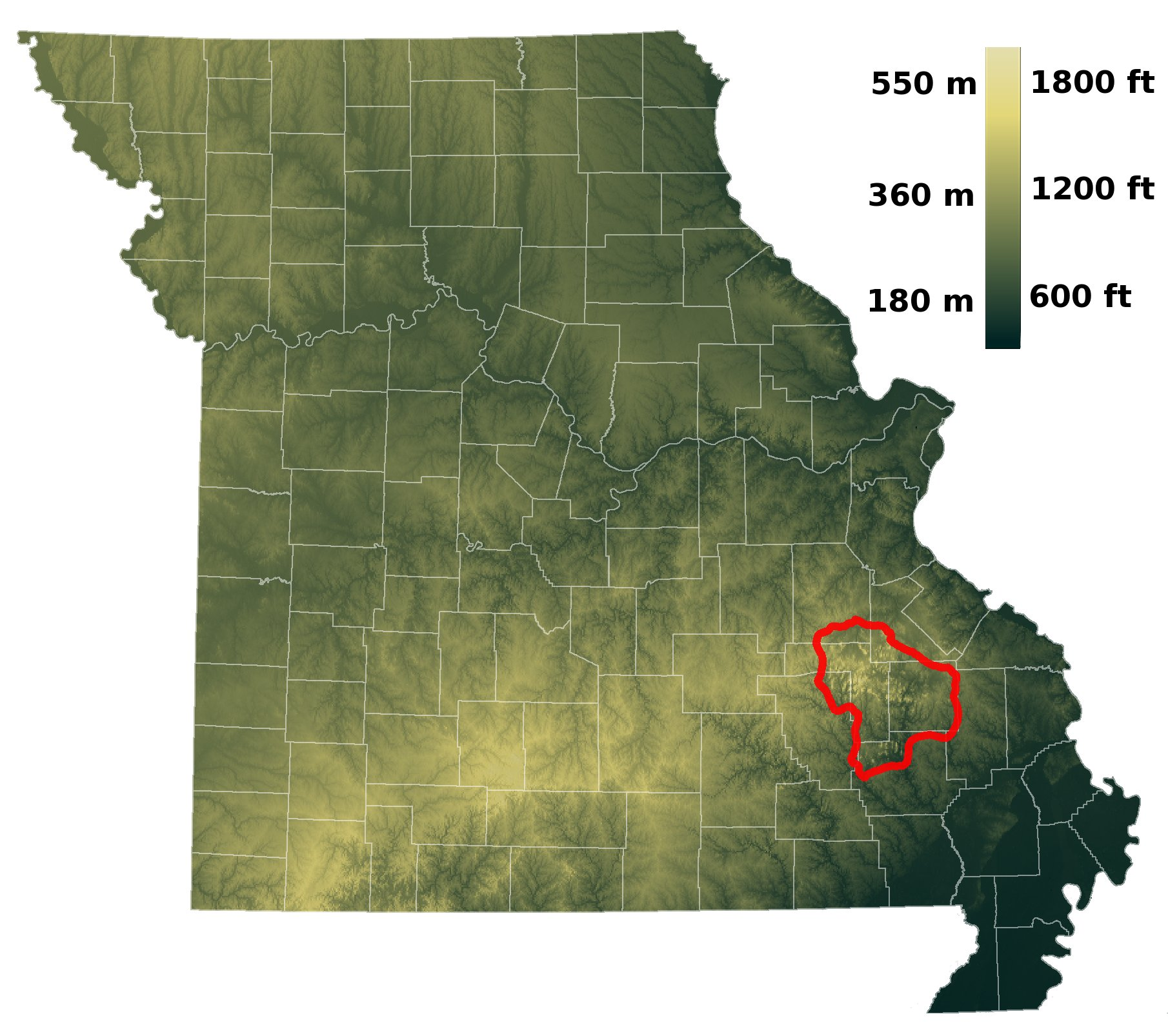
- A relief map of Missouri showing the St. Francois Mountain region (red)
- Country: United States
- State: Missouri

Geology
- Rock age: Precambrian
- Rock type: igneous

The St. Francois Mountains in southeast Missouri are a mountain range of Precambrian igneous mountains rising over the Ozark Plateau. This range is one of the oldest exposures of igneous rock in North America. The name of the range is spelled out as Saint Francois Mountains in official GNIS sources, but it is sometimes misspelled in use as St. Francis Mountains to match the anglicized pronunciation of both the range and St. Francois County.

== Name ==
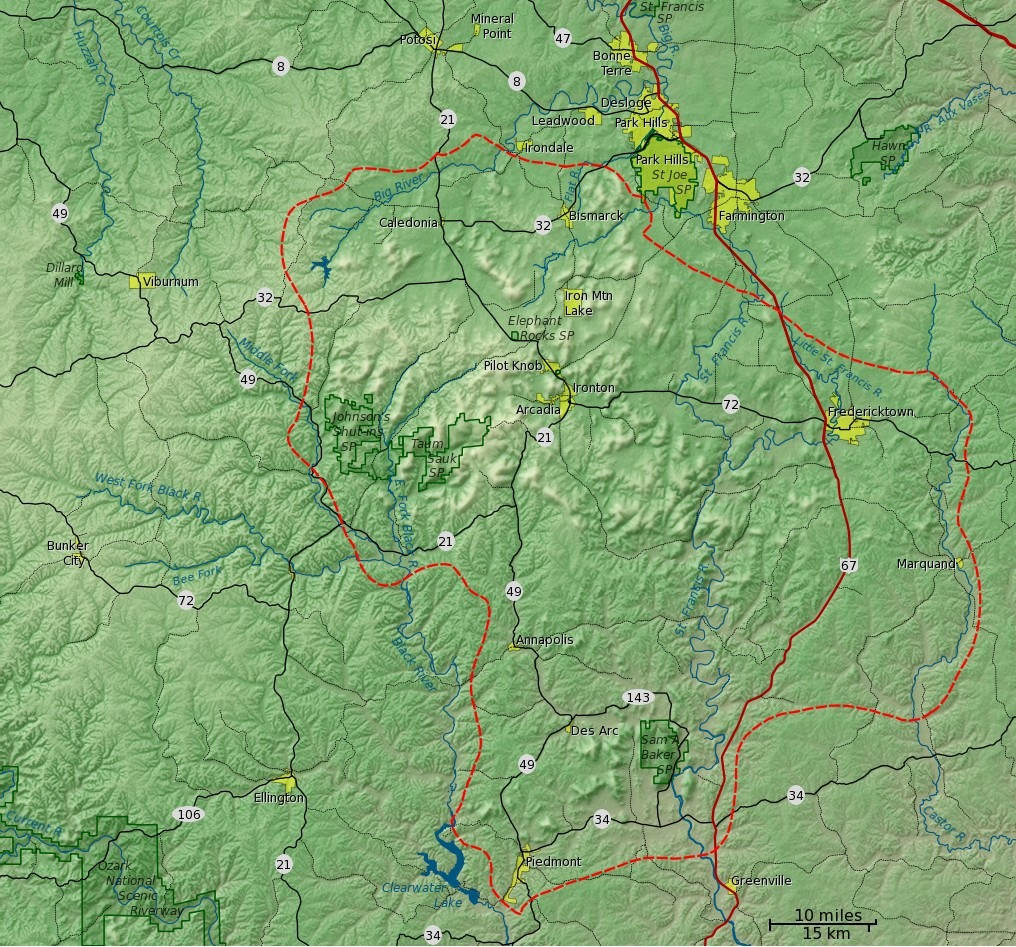
Detail map of the St. Francois Mountain region

The name of the range derives from the St. Francis River, which originates in the St. Francois Mountains. The origin of the river's name, which also was originally spelled "François" in the French manner, is unclear. The area, as part of the Louisiana district of New France, is near some of the earliest French settlements in Missouri, where many French place names survive. Some sources conjecture that the name honors St. Francis of Assisi (1181/1182–1226), the patron saint of the Franciscan order, but none of the region's early explorers were Franciscans. Others propose that Jacques Marquette, a French Jesuit, named the river when he explored its mouth in present-day Arkansas in 1673. Before his voyage down the Mississippi River, Marquette had spent some time at the mission of St. François Xavier, named for the Jesuit missionary Francis Xavier (1506–1552). The spelling of the river's name shifted from "Francois" to "Francis" in the early 20th century.

== Geology ==
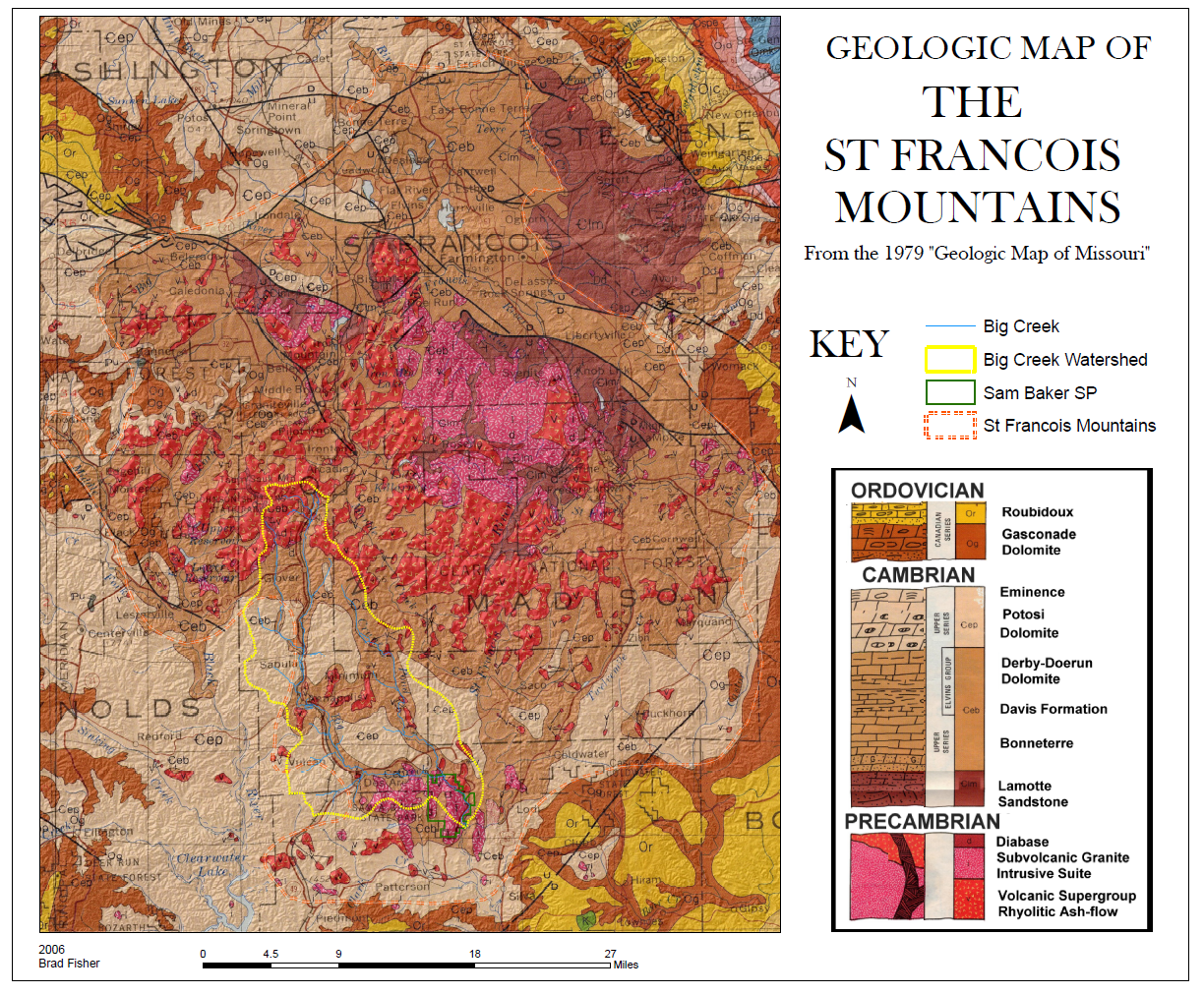
Geologic map of the St. Francois Mountain region

The St. Francois Mountains were formed by volcanic and intrusive activity 1.485 billion years ago.

The intrusive rocks of the area are composed of three types: subvolcanic massifs, ring intrusions and central plutons.

The subvolcanic intrusives are similar in geochemistry to the associated rhyolite volcanics, which they intrude into. They are granite with granophyric quartz, perthitic potassium feldspar, biotite and magnetite. They are intrusive into the rhyolites with development of fine-grained granophyre at the contact. At depth they exhibit a coarse-grained rapakivi texture. The subvolcanic granites are the most widespread igneous rocks and were thought to have been covered with extensive volcanics that have been removed by erosion.

The ring intrusives are high-silica bodies which were intruded along ring faults associated with caldera collapse. Rock types include trachyandesite, trachyte, syenite and amphibole - biotite granite. They are commonly porphyritic.

The central plutons are highly evolved two-mica (contain both biotite and muscovite) granites. Distinctive accessory minerals include: fluorite, topaz, apatite, spinel, allanite, sphene and cassiterite. They are enriched in tin, lithium, beryllium, rubidium, barium, yttrium, niobium, uranium, thorium and fluorine and are referred to as "tin granites'. Their circular to oval shape in plan view is consistent with emplacement within resurgent calderas.

The exposed igneous rocks of the St. Francois are surrounded at depth by the slightly younger (~100 my) widely distributed igneous Spavinaw terrane. The Spavinaw rocks are intersected in drill core across southern Missouri, southern Illinois, northern Arkansas, southern Kansas and northeastern Oklahoma. The Spavinaw rocks occur in outcrop only near Spavinaw, Oklahoma. The rhyolites and ash flow tuffs of the Spavinaw are essentially identical to the volcanics of the St. Francois mountains (the Washington County volcanics).

The Saint Francois Mountains were formed by igneous activity, whereas most of the surrounding Ozarks are developed on Paleozoic sedimentary rocks as a dissected plateau. The localized vertical relief was caused by erosion following uplift during the Pennsylvanian and Permian periods produced by the Ouachita orogeny to the south. Elevations and strata dips in the Ozark structural dome generally radiate downward and outward away from the Saint Francois mountains.

These ancient reef complexes formed the localizing structures for the mineralizing fluids that resulted in the rich ore deposits of the area.

The igneous rocks of the Saint Francois Mountains are interpreted to be a series of caldera complexes, similar in scale to the Yellowstone Caldera complex. However, it is debated whether the igneous activity was related to a hotspot, like Yellowstone, or an ancient subduction zone.

=== Mineral resources ===
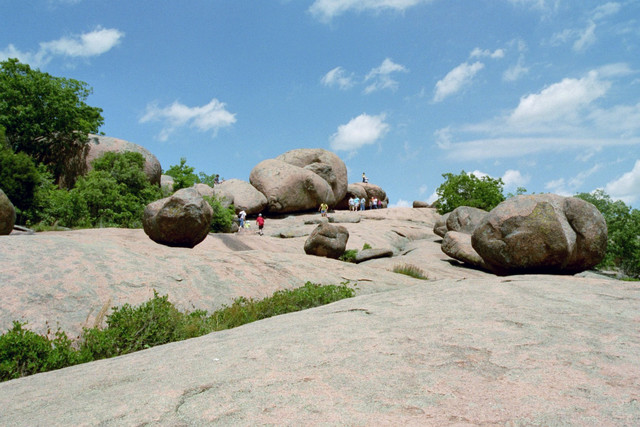
Boulders in Elephant Rocks State Park are residual boulders of weathered Graniteville Granite, a pluton formed 1.4 billion years ago in the Proterozoic by the cooling of magma.

The St. Francois Mountains are the center of the Lead Belt, a mining region yielding lead, iron, baryte, zinc, silver, manganese, cobalt, and nickel ores. Historic Mine La Motte near Fredericktown was the site of lead mining activity by the French as early as 1720. The area today accounts for over 90% of primary lead production in the United States.

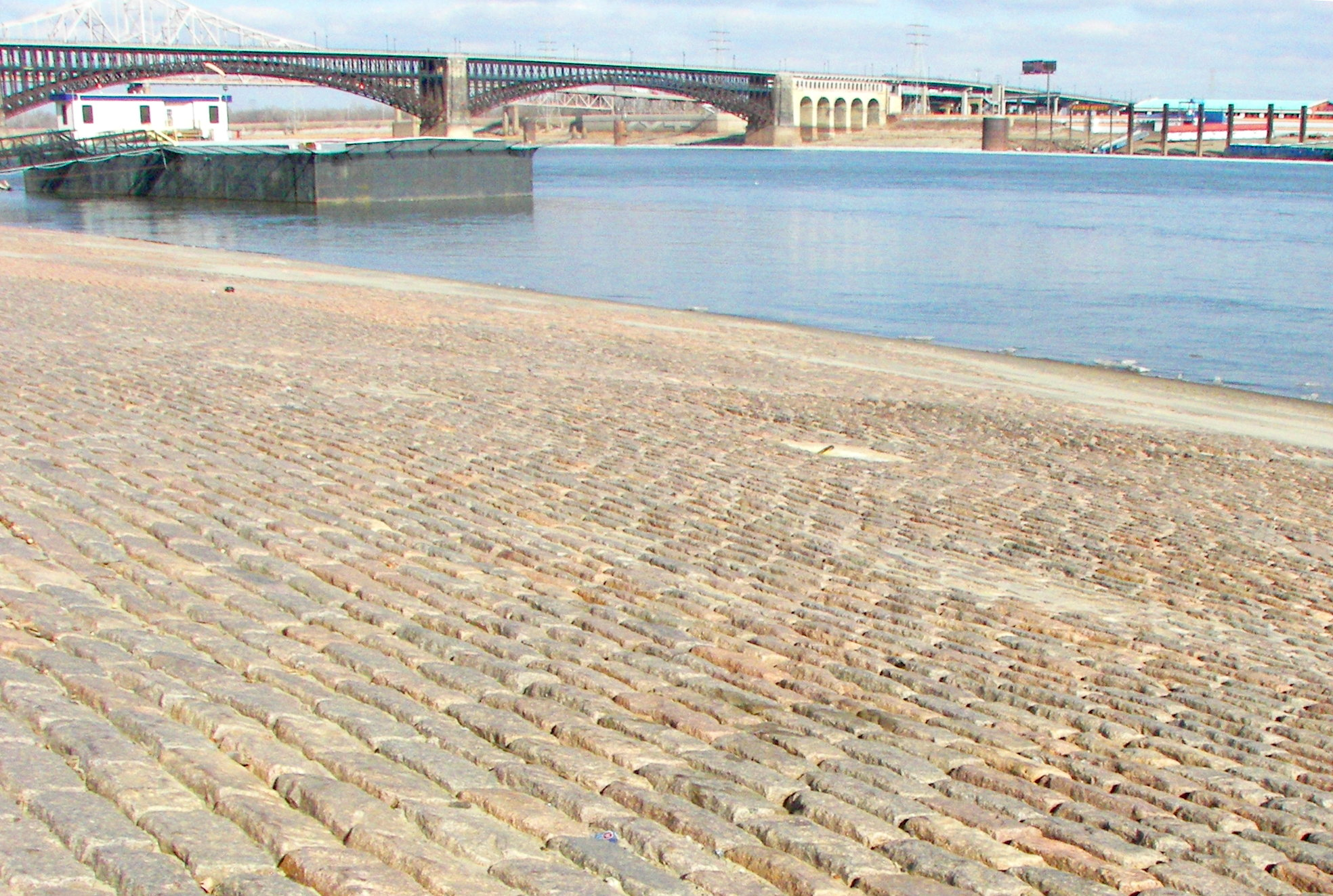
Granite from this region was used for cobblestones on the St. Louis wharf and in the piers of the Eads Bridge (background).

Granite has been commercially quarried since 1869 in the vicinity of Elephant Rocks State Park, a tor with huge weathered granite boulders. The red architectural granite quarried in the area has been used in buildings in St. Louis and other areas in the country. It is currently marketed as Missouri Red monument stone.

=== Structural features ===
Hughes Mountain contains a good example of columnar jointing in igneous rhyolite, the same process that formed Devils Tower in Wyoming and the Giant's Causeway in Ireland. The columnar jointing in this area is called the Devil's Honeycomb.

== Peaks ==
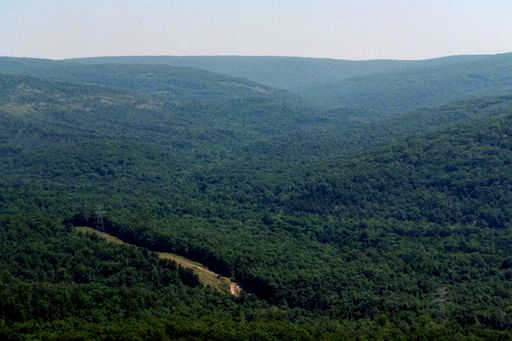
Taum Sauk Mountain is the highest point in Missouri.

Mountains in this range include; Taum Sauk Mountain, Bell Mountain, Buford Mountain, Proffit Mountain, Pilot Knob, Hughes Mountain, Goggin Mountain and Lead Hill Mountain. The elevations range from 500 to 1,772 feet (152 to 540 meters). Taum Sauk Mountain is the highest peak in the range, and the highest point in the state, with an elevation of 1,772 ft (540 m). In the southernmost reaches of the range is Clark's Mountain, elevation 1,450 ft (440 m), with the distinction of being the highest isolated point in the range and in the state; it reaches its top from surrounding terrain of about 900 ft (270 m) in less than two miles (3.2 km). Black Mountain, in Madison County, has the highest rise in elevation from its base, along the St. Francis River (540 feet above sea level) to its summit (1,502 feet above sea level), a rise of just under 1,000 feet in elevation.

Table showing Mountains in the St. Francois Range
Mountain peak	County	Elevation	Prominence	Isolation	Location
Taum Sauk Mountain (Note: Taum Sauk Mountain is the highest summit of Iron County, Missouri, as well as the state overall.)	Iron	1,772 ft 540 m	512 ft 156 m	148.1 mi 238 km	37°34′17″N 90°43′45″W
Buford Mountain	Iron	1,739 ft 530 m	640 ft 195 m	8.74 mi 14.06 km	37°41′49″N 90°41′24″W
Bell Mountain	Iron	1,703 ft 519 m	384 ft 117 m	7.11 mi 11.45 km	37°37′34″N 90°51′58″W
Proffit Mountain (Note: Proffit Mountain is the highest summit of Reynolds County, Missouri.)	Reynolds	1,699 ft 518 m	361 ft 110 m	1.3 mi 2.1 km	37°34′08″N 90°46′53″W
Johnson Mountain	Iron	1,660 ft 506 m	381 ft 116 m	6.84 mi 11.01 km	37°43′37″N 90°53′20″W
Brown Mountain	St. Francois	1,650 ft 503 m	489 ft 149 m	4.73 mi 7.62 km	37°40′57″N 90°35′57″W
Stono Mountain	St. Francois	1,644 ft 501 m	482 ft 147 m	3.6 mi 5.79 km	37°43′03″N 90°33′01″W
Black Mountain	Madison	1,503 ft 458 m	384 ft 117 m	4.24 mi 6.83 km	37°28′09″N 90°29′46″W

== Recreation ==
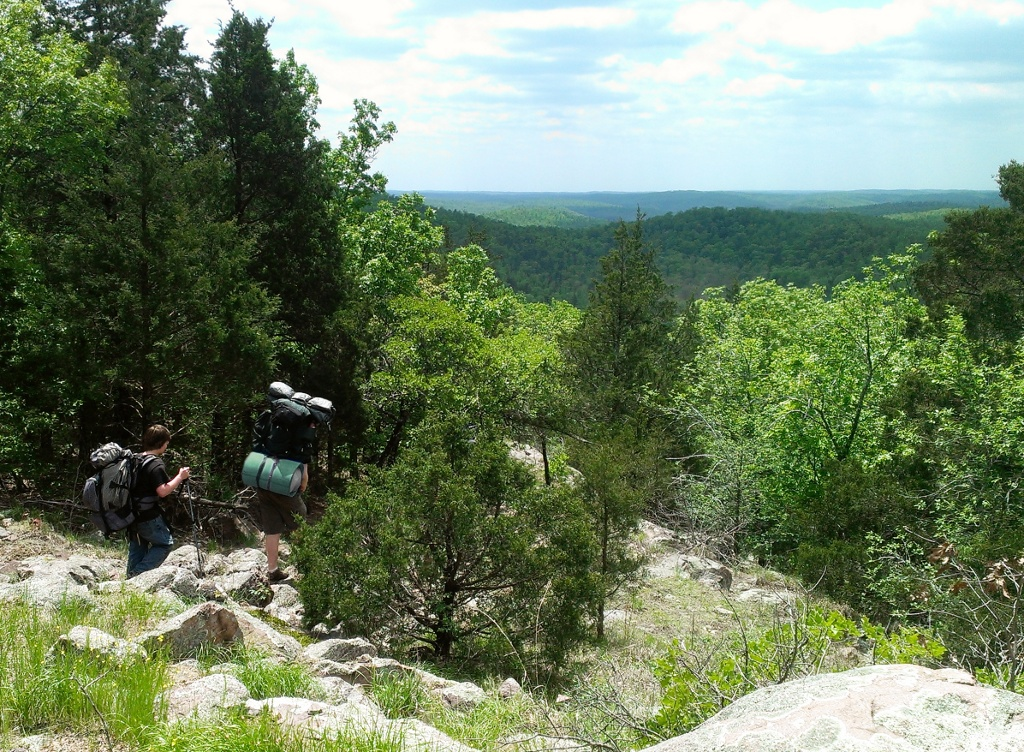
Ozark Trail on Goggins Mountain in Johnson's Shut-Ins State Park

Five Missouri state parks – Johnson's Shut-Ins, Taum Sauk Mountain, St. Joe, Sam A. Baker and Elephant Rocks – are located in this region. Public lands held by the Missouri Department of Conservation provide access for hiking, backpacking, hunting, fishing, canoeing, and boating. The Mark Twain National Forest contains additional public lands, including the Bell Mountain Wilderness. A section of the Ozark Trail winds through parts of the St. Francois Mountains, including a popular segment that crosses Taum Sauk and Proffit mountains.

The St. Francis River in this area is a whitewater stream in the spring when water levels are up, and it has hosted the Missouri Whitewater Championships annually since 1968.

== See also ==
- Geography of Missouri
- Missouri National and State Parks
- Taum Sauk pumped storage plant
