= Taum Sauk Mountain =

Highest natural point in Missouri, United States

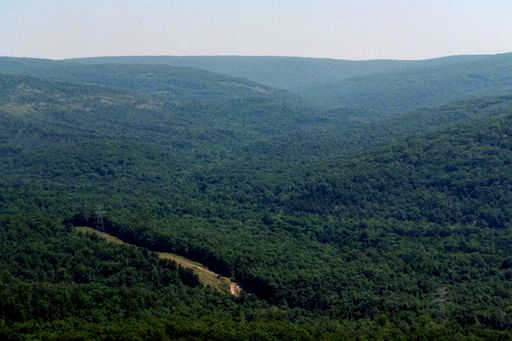
- Taum Sauk Mountain is part of a large parks-and-wilderness area.

Highest point
- Elevation: 1,772 ft (540 m)
- Prominence: 512 ft (156 m)
- Listing: U.S. state high point 41st
- Coordinates: 37°34′13″N 90°43′40″W

Geography
- Location within Missouri
- Location: Iron County, Missouri, U.S.
- Parent range: Saint Francois Mountains
- Topo map: USGS Ironton

Climbing
- Easiest route: Hike

Taum Sauk Mountain /ˈtɔːm ˈsɔːk/ in the Saint Francois Mountains is the highest natural point in the U.S. state of Missouri at 1,772 ft (540 m). The topography of Taum Sauk is that of an elongated ridge with a NNW-SSE orientation rather than a peak.

== Description ==
While relatively low in terms of elevation at 1,772 ft (540 m) compared to other peaks, Taum Sauk and the St. Francois range are true mountains, being the result of a volcanic orogeny. Whereas vertical relief in the rest of the Ozarks region is the result of erosion of sedimentary strata, the St. Francois are an ancient Precambrian igneous uplift several times older than the Appalachians. Geologists believe that Taum Sauk and its neighbors may be among the few areas in the US never to have been submerged in ancient seas. The peaks of the St. Francois range existed as islands in the shallow seaway throughout most of the Paleozoic Era as the sandstones, limestones, and shales typical of the Ozarks were deposited. Weathering and erosion of these ancient peaks provided the clastic sediments of the surrounding rock layers.

Taum Sauk is said to be named for a Piankeshaw chief named Sauk-Ton-Qua.

Though Taum Sauk Mountain is the highest mountain in Missouri, it is not the most prominent. Taum Sauk rises 522 ft (159 m) from an already elevated base. Mudlick Mountain rises 693 ft (211 m) from a lower base to an elevation of 1,313 ft (400 m). Black Mountain, in Madison County, has the highest rise in elevation in Missouri. From its base, along the St. Francis River (540 ft [160 m] above sea level) to its summit (1,502 ft [458 m] above sea level), Black Mountain rises just under 1,000 ft (300 m) in elevation from the valley below.

== State park ==
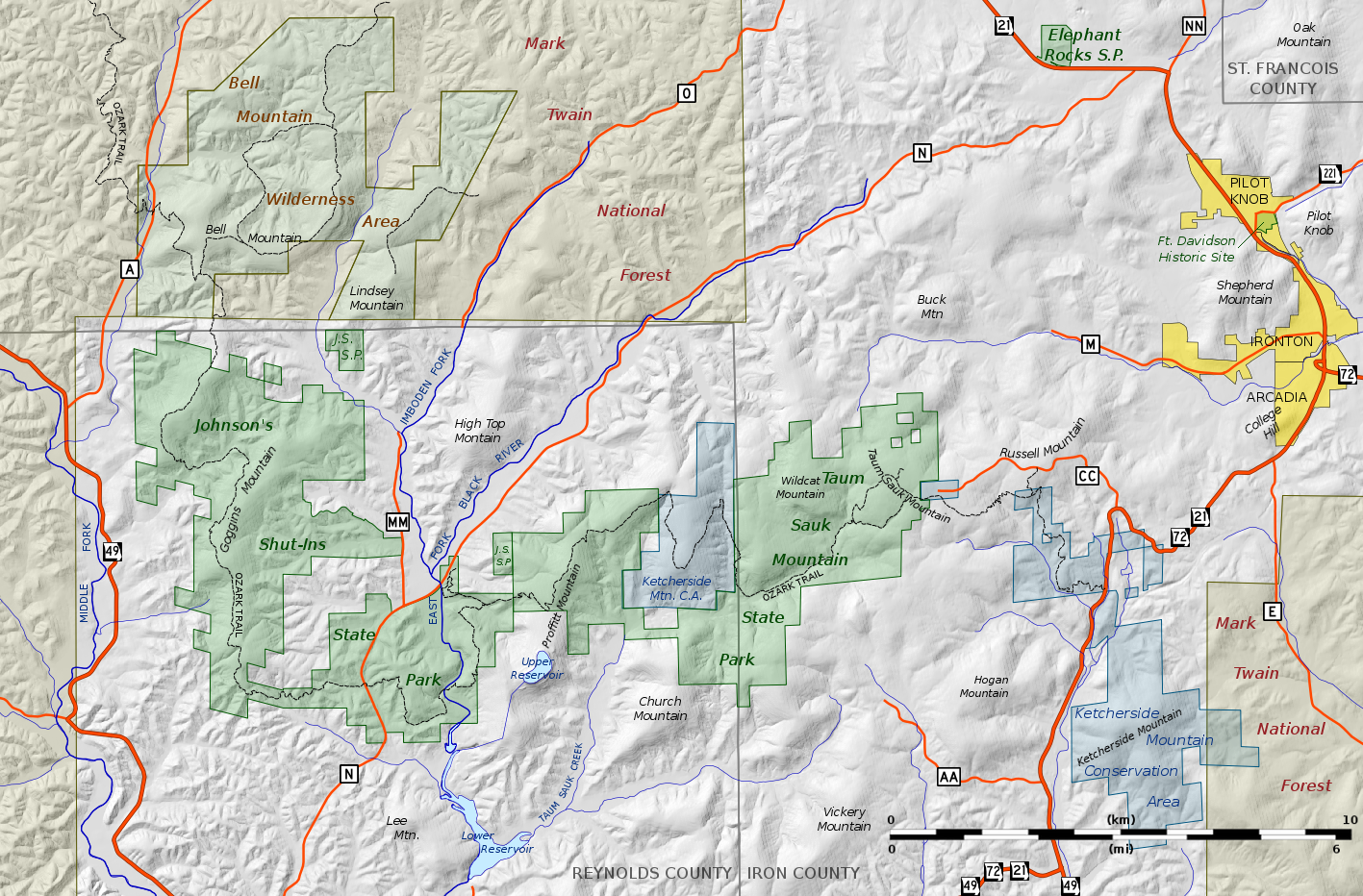
Taum Sauk is located in a large parks and wilderness area.

In 1991 Missouri created Taum Sauk Mountain State Park, a 7,448-acre (30.14 km^{2}) state park on the mountain: it has a rustic campground, a paved trail to the highpoint marked by a polished granite plaque, and a lookout tower from which a good view can be had; the dense forest on the mountain obscures the view from most other vantage points. Taum Sauk State Park is in a common jurisdiction with nearby Johnson's Shut-ins State Park, and together they comprise the second largest state park in Missouri with a total area of 15,961.5 acres (64.594 km^{2}). These parks and the adjacent Bell Mountain Wilderness Area make up part of a large wilderness area that is very popular with hikers and backpackers. The 33-mile (53 km) Taum Sauk section of the Ozark Trail is considered by the Ozark Trail Association to be one of the finest trails in Missouri.

Mina Sauk Falls, the highest waterfall in Missouri, is on Taum Sauk and can be visited by hiking a rugged trail that makes a 3-mile (4.8 km) loop from the highpoint parking area. These falls normally have water cascading over them only during times of wet weather. At other times they are reduced to a trickle or less.

The Taum Sauk pumped storage plant, which failed on December 14, 2005 sending a flash flood 20 feet (6 m) deep down the Black River, is not actually on Taum Sauk Mountain. It is on Proffit Mountain, about five miles (8 km) southwest.

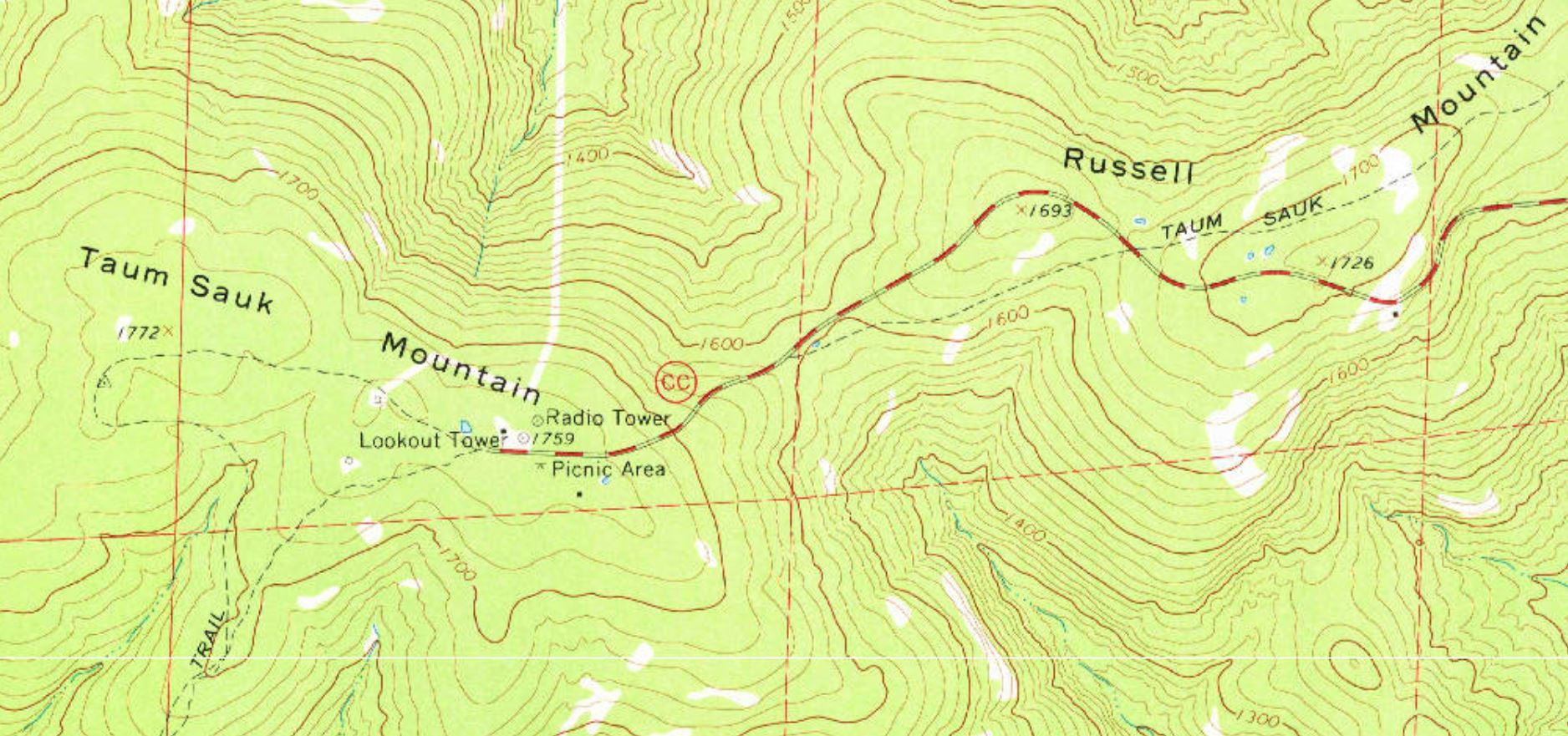
USGS Topographic map of the Taum Sauk area

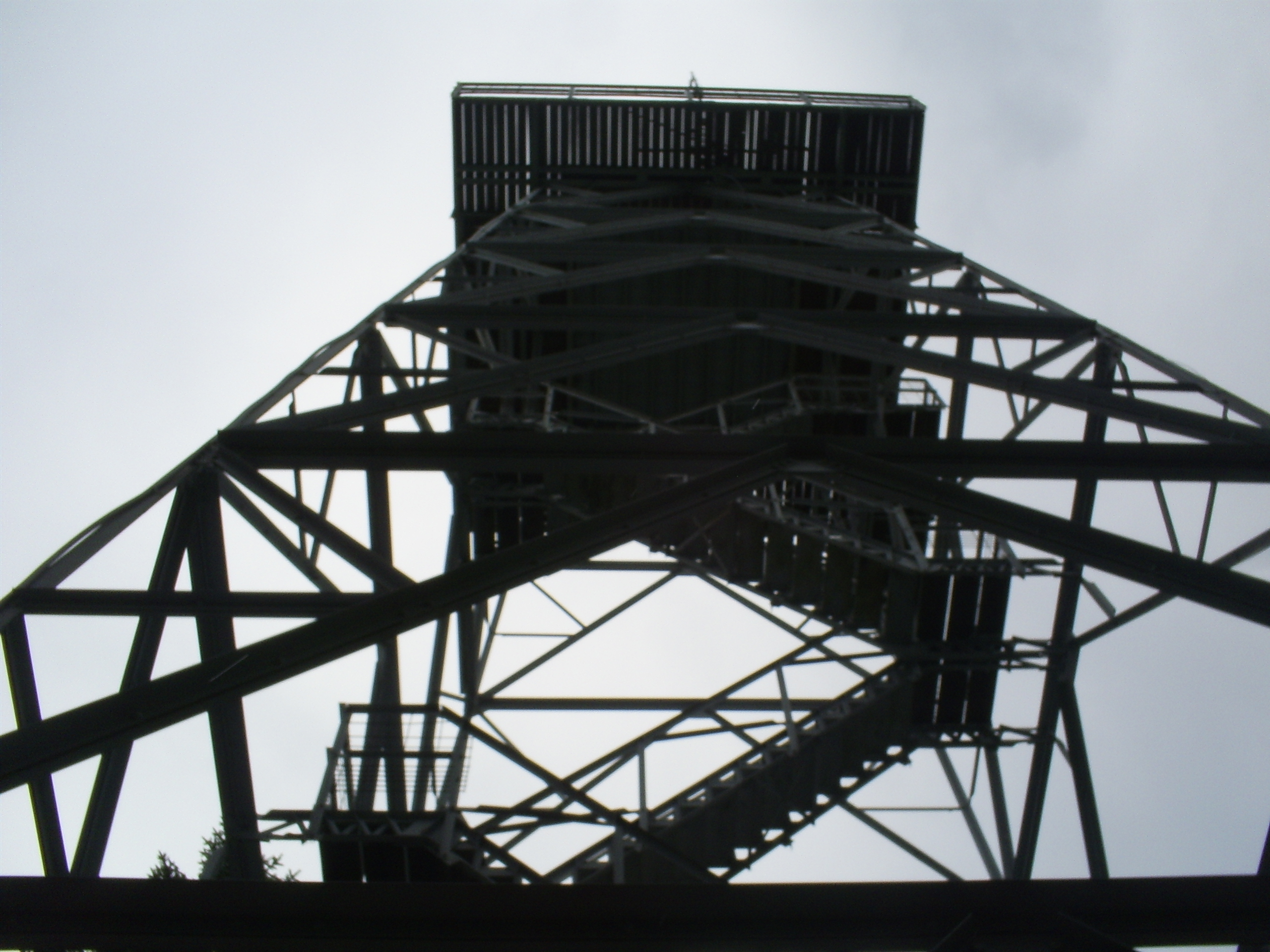
Taum Sauk lookout tower.

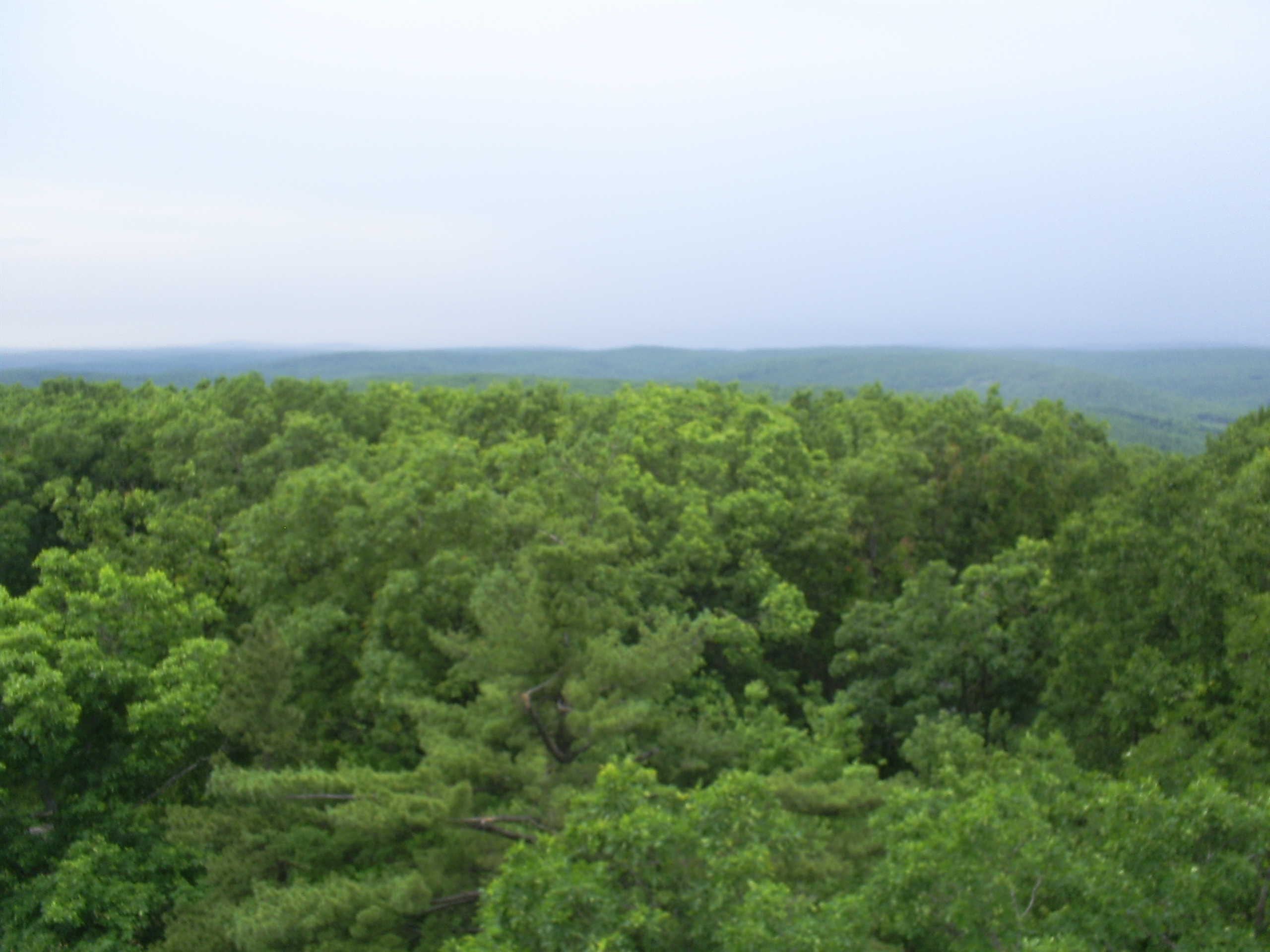
View from lookout tower.

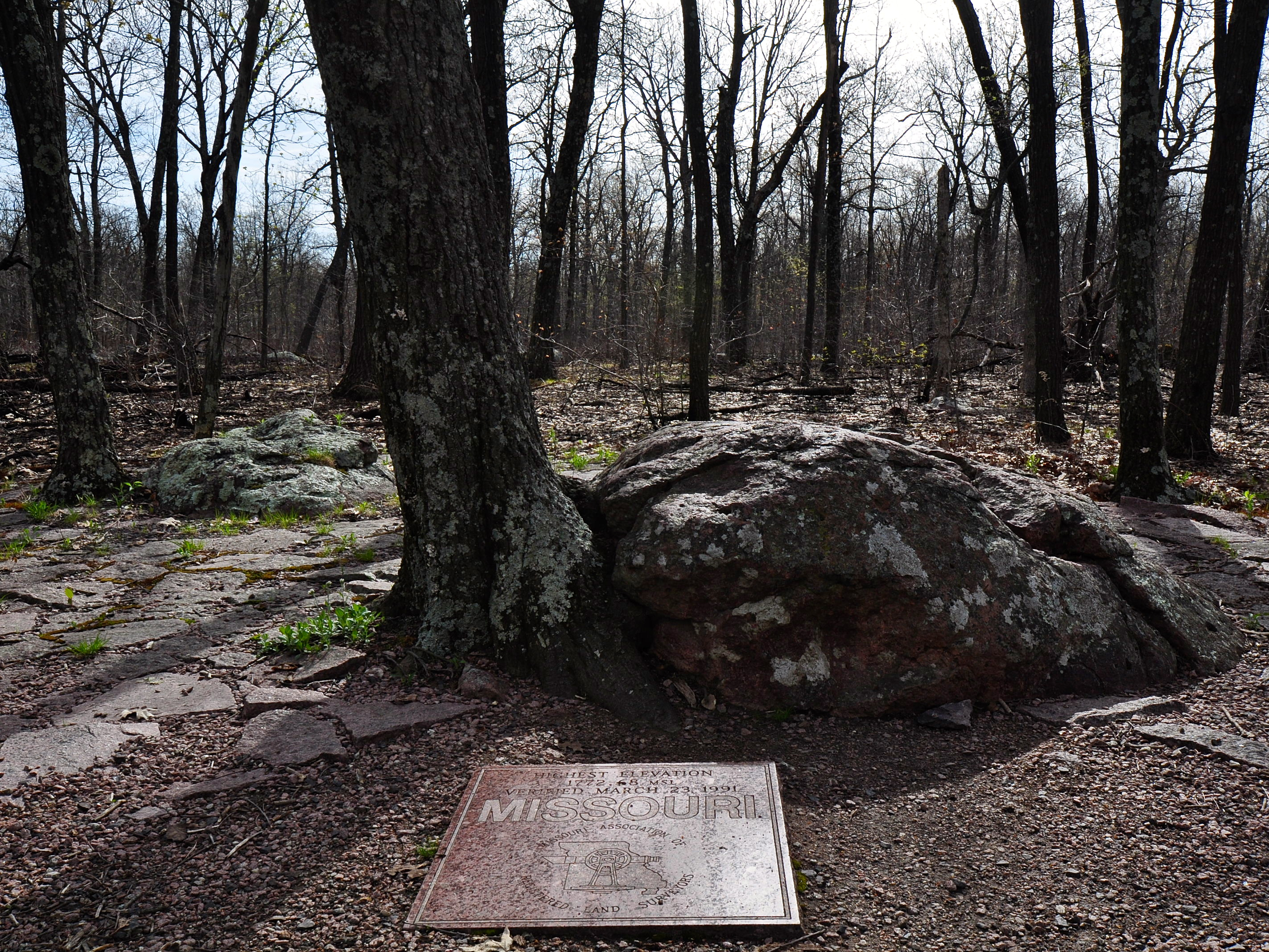
The highest natural point in the U.S. state of Missouri at 1,772 feet.

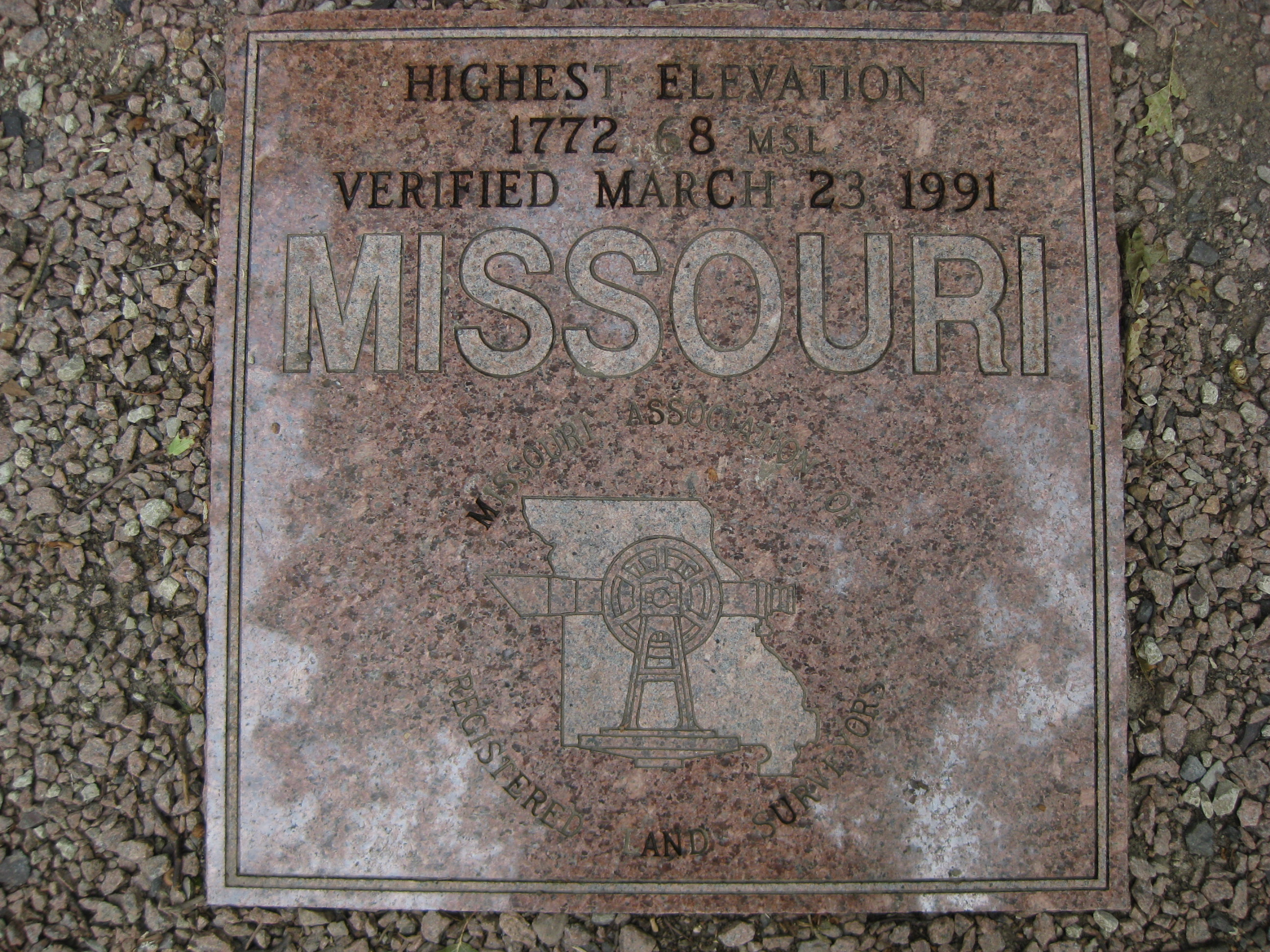
Granite plaque placed by the Missouri Association of Registered Land Surveyors

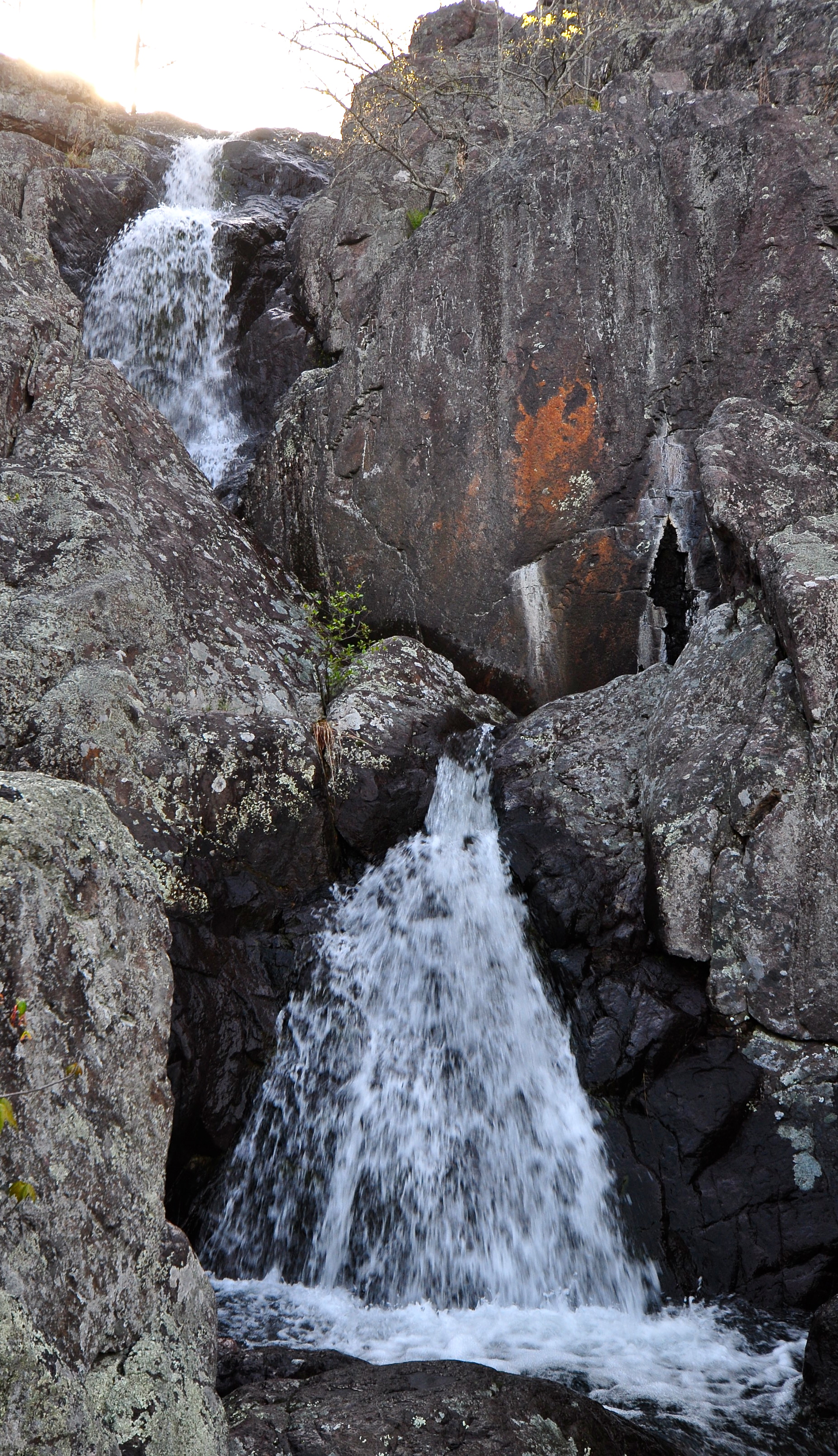
Mina Sauk Falls, the highest waterfall in Missouri.

== See also ==
- List of mountain peaks of Missouri
- List of U.S. states and territories by elevation
