= List of mountain peaks of Missouri =

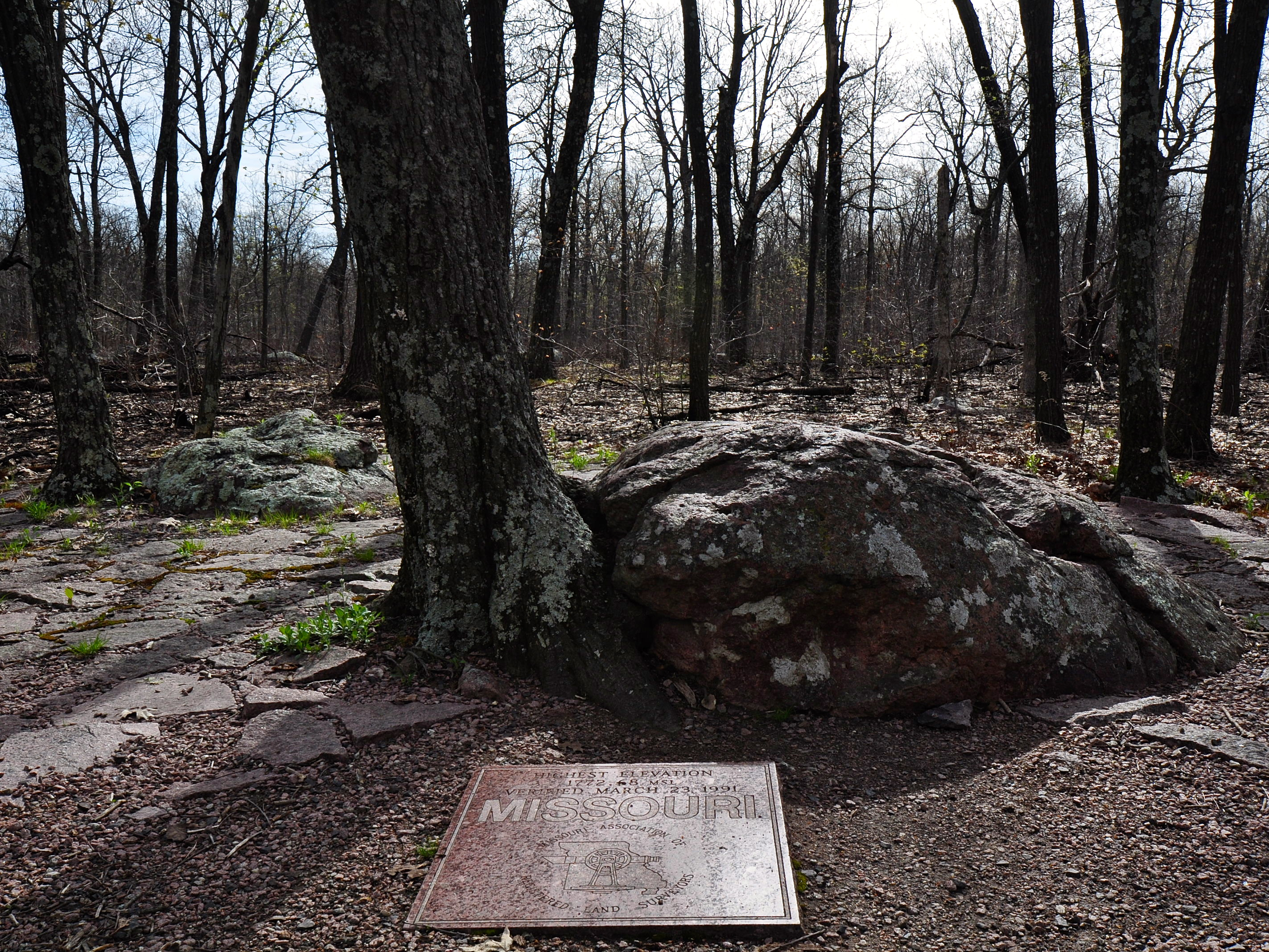
The highest natural point in the U.S. state of Missouri, Taum Sauk Mountain at 1,772 feet (540 m) above sea level.

This article comprises three sortable tables of the significant mountain peaks of Missouri. This article defines a significant mountain peak as a summit with at least 100 meters (328.1 feet) of topographic prominence, and a major summit as a summit with at least 500 meters (1640 feet) of topographic prominence. All summits in this article have at least 100 meters of topographic prominence. An ultra-prominent summit is a summit with at least 1500 meters (4921 feet) of topographic prominence.

The summit of a mountain or hill may be measured in three principal ways:

1. The topographic elevation of a summit measures the height of the summit above a geodetic sea level. The first table below ranks the 20 highest summits of Missouri by elevation.
2. The topographic prominence of a summit is a measure of how high the summit rises above its surroundings. The second table below ranks the 20 most prominent summits of Missouri.
3. The topographic isolation (or radius of dominance) of a summit measures how far the summit lies from its nearest point of equal elevation. The third table below ranks the 50 most isolated major summits of Missouri.

== Highest significant summits ==
Of these 9 peaks, 4 are located in Iron County, 2 in St. Francois County, 1 in Webster County, 1 in Reynolds County, and 1 in Madison County.

The 9 highest summits of Missouri with at least 100 meters of topographic prominence
Rank	Mountain peak	County	Mountain range	Elevation	Prominence	Isolation	Location
1	Taum Sauk Mountain (Note: Taum Sauk Mountain is the highest summit of Iron County, Missouri, as well as the state overall.)	Iron County	St. Francois Mountains	1,772 ft 540 m	512 ft 156 m	148.1 mi 238 km	37°34′17″N 90°43′45″W
2	Webster County High Point (Note: Webster County High Point is the highest summit of Webster County, Missouri.)	Webster County	Ozarks	1,739 ft 530 m	459 ft 140 m	10.49 mi 16.88 km	37°13′44″N 92°44′29″W
2	Buford Mountain	Iron County	St. Francois Mountains	1,739 ft 530 m	640 ft 195 m	8.74 mi 14.06 km	37°41′49″N 90°41′24″W
4	Bell Mountain	Iron County	St. Francois Mountains	1,703 ft 519 m	384 ft 117 m	7.11 mi 11.45 km	37°37′34″N 90°51′58″W
5	Proffit Mountain (Note: Proffit Mountain is the highest summit of Reynolds County, Missouri.)	Reynolds	St. Francois Mountains	1,699 ft 518 m	361 ft 110 m	1.3 mi 2.1 km	37°34′08″N 90°46′53″W
6	Johnson Mountain	Iron County	St. Francois Mountains	1,660 ft 506 m	381 ft 116 m	6.84 mi 11.01 km	37°43′37″N 90°53′20″W
7	Brown Mountain	Saint Francois County	St. Francois Mountains	1,650 ft 503 m	489 ft 149 m	4.73 mi 7.62 km	37°40′57″N 90°35′57″W
8	Stono Mountain	Saint Francois County	St. Francois Mountains	1,644 ft 501 m	482 ft 147 m	3.6 mi 5.79 km	37°43′03″N 90°33′01″W
9	Black Mountain	Madison County	St. Francois Mountains	1,503 ft 458 m	384 ft 117 m	4.24 mi 6.83 km	37°28′09″N 90°29′46″W

== Most prominent summits ==
The 9 most topographically prominent summits of Missouri
Rank	Mountain peak	County	Mountain range	Elevation	Prominence	Isolation	Location
1	Buford Mountain	Iron County	St. Francois Mountains	1,739 ft 530 m	640 ft 195 m	8.74 mi 14.06 km	37°41′49″N 90°41′24″W
2	Taum Sauk Mountain	Iron County	St. Francois Mountains	1,772 ft 540 m	512 ft 156 m	148.1 mi 238 km	37°34′17″N 90°43′45″W
3	Brown Mountain	Saint Francois County	St. Francois Mountains	1,650 ft 503 m	489 ft 149 m	4.73 mi 7.62 km	37°40′57″N 90°35′57″W
4	Stono Mountain	Saint Francois County	St. Francois Mountains	1,644 ft 501 m	482 ft 147 m	3.6 mi 5.79 km	37°43′03″N 90°33′01″W
5	Webster County High Point	Webster County	Ozarks	1,739 ft 530 m	459 ft 140 m	10.49 mi 16.88 km	37°13′44″N 92°44′29″W
6	Bell Mountain	Iron County	St. Francois Mountains	1,703 ft 519 m	384 ft 117 m	7.11 mi 11.45 km	37°37′34″N 90°51′58″W
6	Black Mountain	Madison County	St. Francois Mountains	1,503 ft 458 m	384 ft 117 m	4.24 mi 6.83 km	37°28′09″N 90°29′46″W
8	Johnson Mountain	Iron County	St. Francois Mountains	1,660 ft 506 m	381 ft 116 m	6.84 mi 11.01 km	37°43′37″N 90°53′20″W
9	Proffit Mountain	Reynolds	St. Francois Mountains	1,699 ft 518 m	361 ft 110 m	1.3 mi 2.1 km	37°34′08″N 90°46′53″W

== Most isolated significant summits ==
The 9 most topographically isolated summits of Missouri with at least 100 metres of topographic prominence
Rank	Mountain peak	County	Mountain range	Elevation	Prominence	Isolation	Location
1	Taum Sauk Mountain	Iron County	St. Francois Mountains	1,772 ft 540 m	512 ft 156 m	148.1 mi 238 km	37°34′17″N 90°43′45″W
2	Webster County High Point	Webster County	Ozarks	1,739 ft 530 m	459 ft 140 m	10.49 mi 16.88 km	37°13′44″N 92°44′29″W
3	Buford Mountain	Iron County	St. Francois Mountains	1,739 ft 530 m	640 ft 195 m	8.74 mi 14.06 km	37°41′49″N 90°41′24″W
4	Bell Mountain	Iron County	St. Francois Mountains	1,703 ft 519 m	384 ft 117 m	7.11 mi 11.45 km	37°37′34″N 90°51′58″W
5	Johnson Mountain	Iron County	St. Francois Mountains	1,660 ft 506 m	381 ft 116 m	6.84 mi 11.01 km	37°43′37″N 90°53′20″W
6	Brown Mountain	Saint Francois County	St. Francois Mountains	1,650 ft 503 m	489 ft 149 m	4.73 mi 7.62 km	37°40′57″N 90°35′57″W
7	Black Mountain	Madison County	St. Francois Mountains	1,503 ft 458 m	384 ft 117 m	4.24 mi 6.83 km	37°28′09″N 90°29′46″W
8	Stono Mountain	Saint Francois County	St. Francois Mountains	1,644 ft 501 m	482 ft 147 m	3.6 mi 5.79 km	37°43′03″N 90°33′01″W
9	Proffit Mountain	Reynolds	St. Francois Mountains	1,699 ft 518 m	361 ft 110 m	1.3 mi 2.1 km	37°34′08″N 90°46′53″W
