= Elephant Rocks State Park =

State park in Missouri, United States

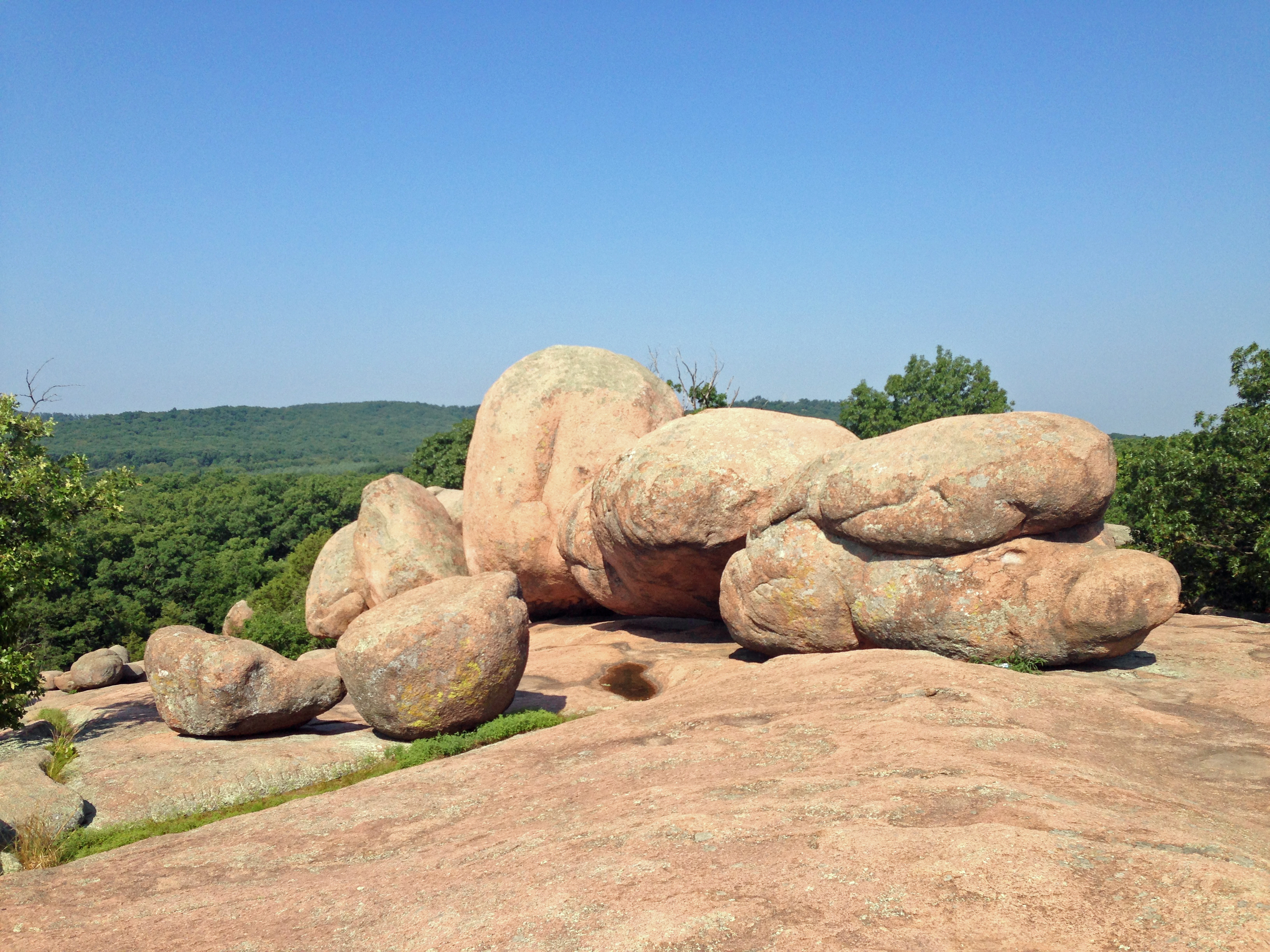

- Location within Missouri Location within the United States
- Location: Iron County, Missouri, United States
- Coordinates: 37°39′16″N 90°41′17″W
- Area: 133.75 acres (54.13 ha)
- Elevation: 1,273 ft (388 m)
- Established: 1967
- Administrator: Missouri Department of Natural Resources
- Visitors: 106,869 (in 2022)
- Website: Official website

Elephant Rocks State Park is a geologic reserve and public recreation area encompassing an outcropping of Precambrian granite in the Saint Francois Mountains in the U.S. state of Missouri. The state park is named for a string of large granite boulders which resemble a train of pink circus elephants. The park was created following the donation of the land to the state in 1967 by geologist Dr. John Stafford Brown. The park is used for picnicking, rock climbing, and trail exploration. It is managed by the Missouri Department of Natural Resources.

== Geology ==
Granite boulders at Elephant Rocks State Park, St. Francois Mountains, Missouri. CC0 photograph by the Public Lands Institute.

The Elephant Rocks, for which Elephant Rocks State Park is named, is a pile of residual boulders of weathered Graniteville Granite. It is a medium- to coarse-grained, muscovite-biotite alkali granite that, on the average, consists of 55 percent alkali feldspar, 40 percent quartz, and less than 5 percent mafic minerals. The Graniteville Granite is a pluton formed 1.4 billion years ago in the Proterozoic by the cooling of magma that intruded into the volcanic strata and country rock associated with a collapsed caldera. Nearly vertical fractures formed in the stone as it cooled, and uplift of the granite enhanced the fracturing. Eventually the overlying strata were removed through erosion, exposing the granite pluton. Before it was exposed, groundwater weathered the granite along fracture joints creating corestones of relatively solid altered granite embedded within friable saprolite. Surface runoff later eroded the saprolite that once surrounded the corestones and left, what are now locally called elephant rocks as boulders perched on the ground surface.

The reddish or pink granite has been quarried in this area since 1869, and two abandoned granite quarries are within the park. These and others nearby have provided red architectural granite for buildings in states from Massachusetts to California, but most particularly in St. Louis, including stone for St. Louis City Hall and the piers of the Eads Bridge. Stones unsuitable for architectural use were made into shoebox-sized paving stones that were used on the streets of St. Louis as well as on its wharf on the Mississippi River. Stone quarried in the area currently is used for mortuary monuments and is known commercially as Missouri Red monument stone.

== Activities and amenities ==
A one-mile (2 km) circular interpretive trail in the Elephant Rocks Natural Area, called the Braille Trail, is the first in Missouri state parks designed specifically for visitors with visual and physical challenges. Spur trails off the main trail include one passing through "Fat Man's Squeeze," a narrow gap between two boulders that leads hikers to an abandoned quarry, and another that goes through "The Maze," a 100-foot (30.48 meter) section of scattered boulders. The park's picnicking area includes ADA-compliant facilities.
