= Taum Sauk Hydroelectric Power Station =

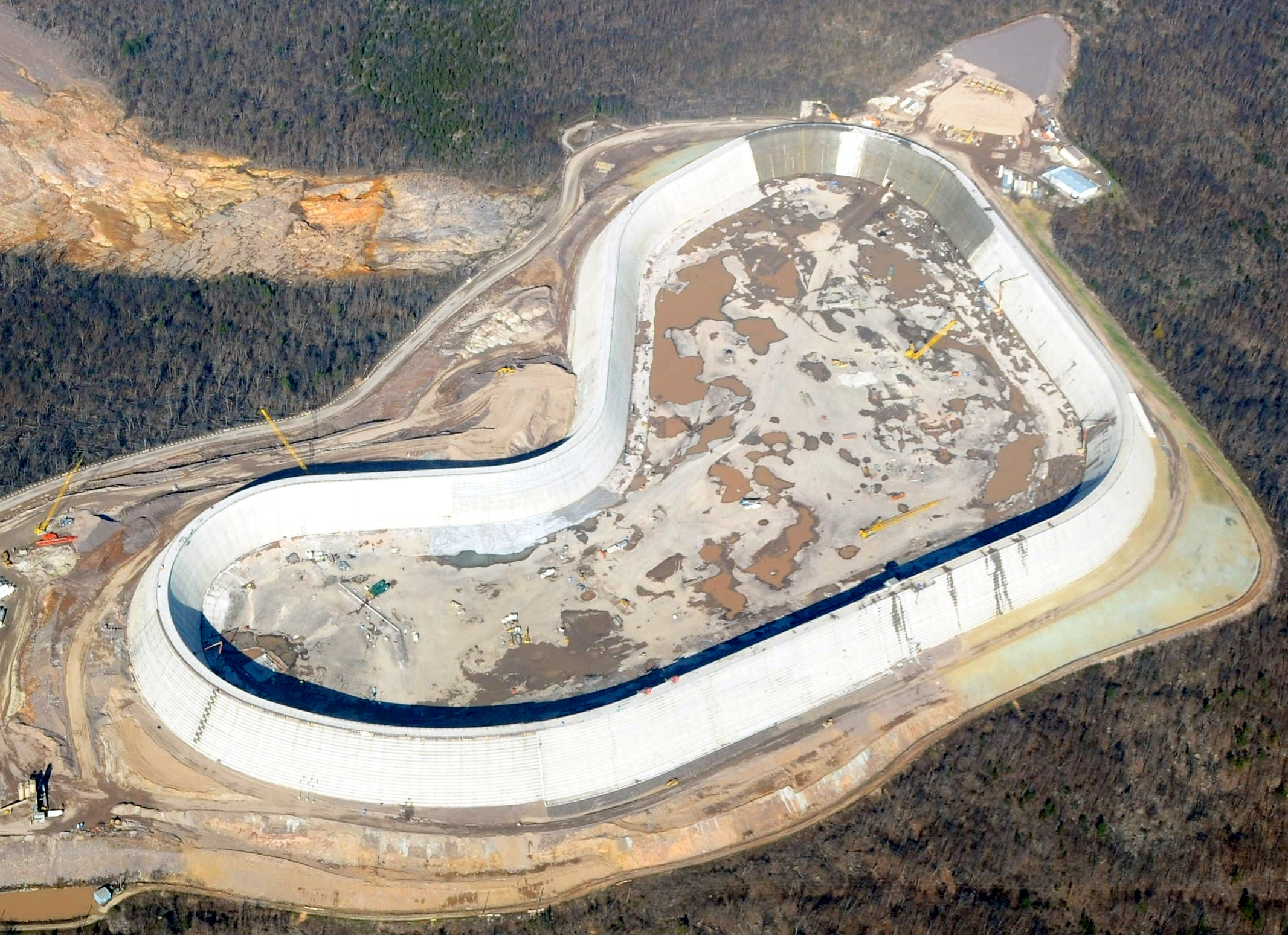
- The rebuilt upper reservoir of the Taum Sauk plant, nearing completion in this photo, is the largest roller-compacted concrete dam in North America.

- Location within Missouri Location within the United States
- Country: United States
- Location: St. Francois Mountains, Missouri
- Coordinates: 37°32′08″N 90°49′05″W
- Purpose: Power
- Status: Operational
- Construction began: 1960
- Opening date: December 20, 1963, April 15, 2010
- Construction cost: US$45.9 million (1963); US$490 million rebuild (2010)
- Owners: Ameren Missouri (previously AmerenUE, formerly Union Electric)
- Operator: Ameren Missouri

Upper dam and spillways
- Type of dam: Gravity dam
- Height (foundation): 125 feet (38 m)
- Length: 6,800 feet (2,100 m)
- Elevation at crest: 1,601 feet (488 m)
- Width (crest): 25 feet (7.6 m)
- Width (base): 150 feet (46 m)
- Dam volume: 3,200,640 cubic yards (2,447,060 m^{3})
- Spillways: 1
- Spillway type: Broad crested weir
- Spillway capacity: 5,358 cubic feet per second (151.7 m^{3}/s)

Upper reservoir
- Total capacity: 4,350 acre-feet (5,370,000 m^{3})
- Surface area: 54.5 acres (22.1 ha)
- Maximum water depth: 120 feet (37 m)
- Normal elevation: 1,597 feet (487 m)

Lower dam and spillways
- Type of dam: Gravity dam
- Impounds: East Fork Black River
- Height (foundation): 60 feet (18 m)
- Height (thalweg): 55 feet (17 m)
- Length: 390 feet (120 m)
- Elevation at crest: 750 feet (230 m)
- Width (base): 75 feet (23 m)
- Spillways: 1
- Spillway type: Ogee crest
- Spillway capacity: 70,000 cubic feet per second (2,000 m^{3}/s)

Lower reservoir
- Creates: Lower Taum Sauk Lake
- Total capacity: 6,350 acre-feet (7,830,000 m^{3})
- Catchment area: 88 square miles (230 km^{2})
- Surface area: 395 acres (160 ha)
- Normal elevation: 749.5 feet (228.4 m)

Power Station
- Coordinates: 37°31′14″N 90°50′04″W
- Operator: Ameren Missouri
- Commission date: December 20, 1963, April 15, 2010
- Type: Pumped-storage
- Hydraulic head: 860 feet (260 m)
- Pump-generators: 2 × 225 MW reversible Francis type
- Installed capacity: 450 MW
- Capacity factor: 5–8%
- Overall efficiency: 70%
- Storage capacity: 8 hours (3600 MW·h)
- 2017 generation: -148 GW·h
- Website; Taum Sauk Energy Center

The Taum Sauk pumped storage plant is a power station in the St. Francois mountain region of Missouri, United States about 90 miles (140 km) south of St. Louis near Lesterville, Missouri, in Reynolds County. It is operated by Southeastern Ameren Missouri.

The pumped-storage hydroelectric plant was constructed from 1960–1962 and was designed to help meet daytime peak electric power demand. It began operation in 1963. Electrical generators are turned by water flowing from a reservoir on top of Proffit Mountain into a lower reservoir on the East Fork of the Black River. At night, excess electricity on the power grid is used to pump water back to the mountaintop.

The Taum Sauk plant is an open-loop pure pumped operation: unlike some other pumped storage sites, there is no natural primary flow into the upper reservoir available for generation. It is therefore a net consumer of electricity; the laws of thermodynamics dictate that more power is used to pump the water up the mountain than is generated when it comes down. However, the plant is still economical to operate because the upper reservoir is refilled at night, when the electrical generation system is running at low-cost baseline capacity. This ability to store huge amounts of energy led its operator to call Taum Sauk "the biggest battery that we have". An unusual feature is the upper reservoir which is constructed on a flat surface, requiring a dam around the entire perimeter.

On December 14, 2005, a catastrophic failure in the upper reservoir dam put the plant out of operation until it was rebuilt, recertified, and reopened on April 21, 2010. The new upper reservoir dam, rebuilt from the ground up, is the largest roller-compacted concrete dam in North America.

== Size and location ==
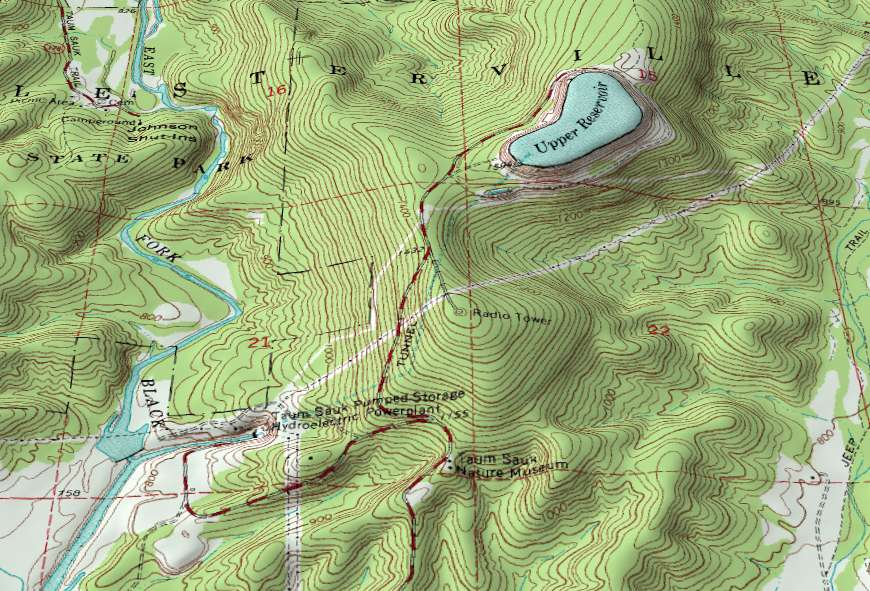
Water stored in the upper reservoir is used to generate electricity during peak demand

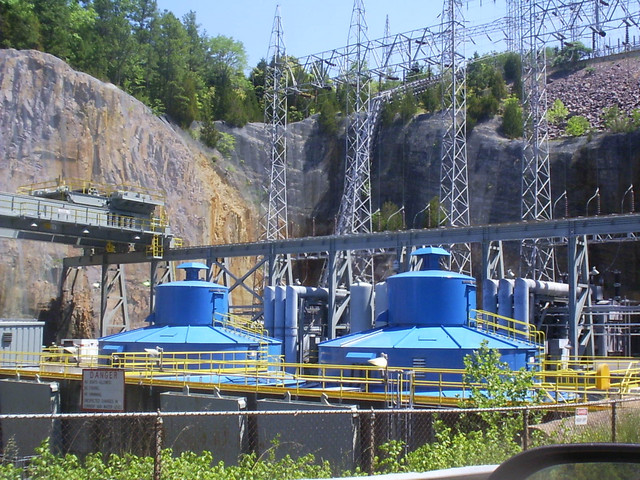
The two generators can each produce up to 225 MW of power

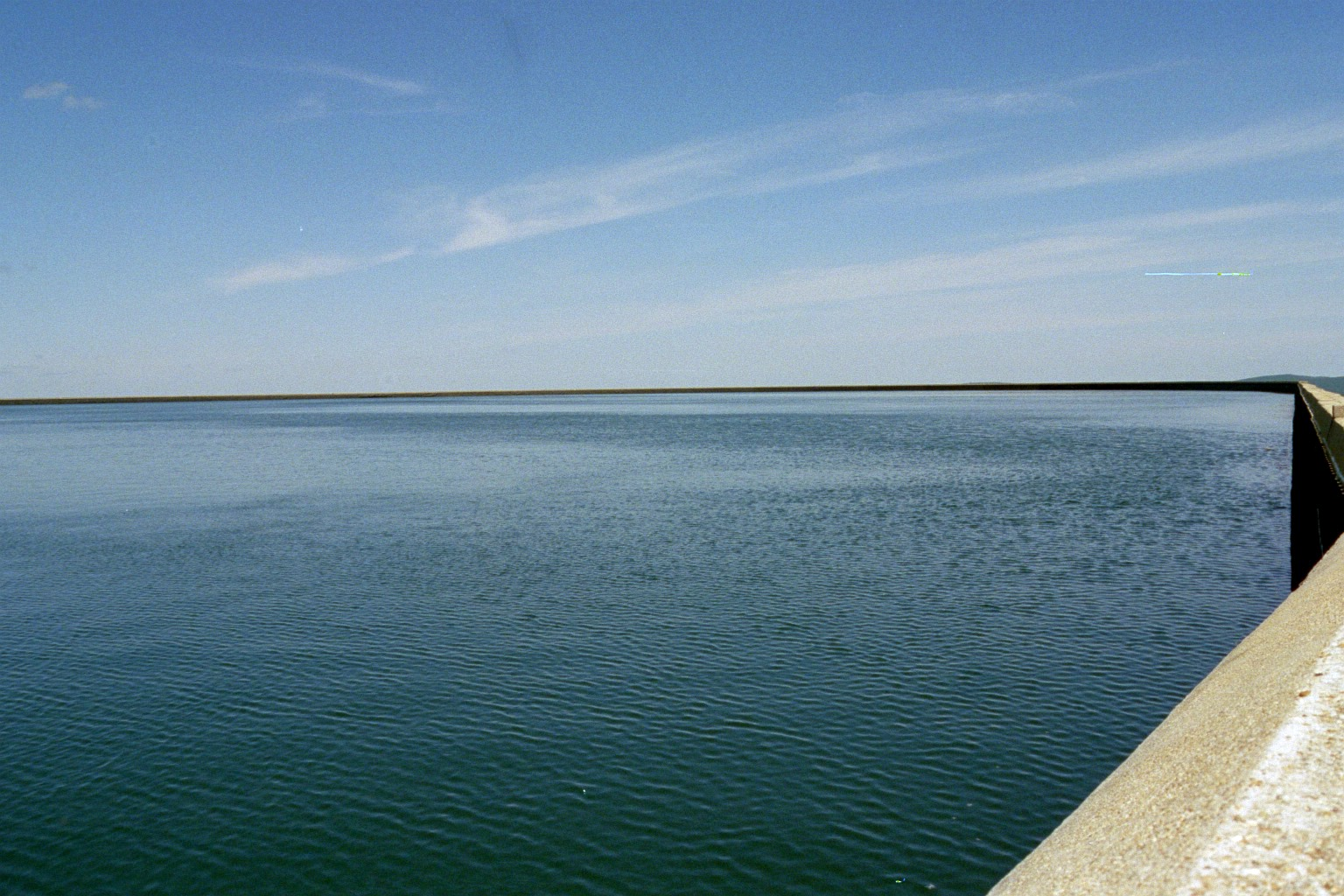
The original upper reservoir, full to within a few feet of the top of the parapet wall

The upper reservoir can hold about 1.5 billion US gallons (4,600 acre-feet; 5.7 million cubic metres) of water behind a wall nearly 100 feet (30 m) tall. It sits 760 feet (230 m) above the 450 MW hydroelectric plant, which gives it a greater head than that of Hoover Dam. The two are connected by a 7,000-foot (2,100 m) tunnel bored through the mountain.

The Taum Sauk upper reservoir sits on a ridge just below the summit of Proffit Mountain, not Taum Sauk Mountain, which is about 5 miles (8 km) to the east. It is visible from Route 21 north of Centerville and from Route N approaching Johnson's Shut-ins State Park from the south.

Before the failure of the upper reservoir, visitors could drive to the top of Proffit Mountain and walk to an observation deck above the reservoir. Ameren operated a museum at the entrance gate highlighting the geologic and natural history of Missouri. The power plant was frequently visited by geology students because of a striking example of Precambrian/Cambrian unconformity in the rock layers exposed by the plant's construction.

== History ==
=== Site selection ===
In 1953, the Union Electric Company began to look for a site on which to build a new pumped storage plant. By 1958, company officials had decided to focus on sites with at least 300 feet (100 m) of vertical head, which would allow them to use a smaller storage reservoir. Union Electric hired Sverdrup-Parcel & Associates to evaluate potential sites in the St. Francois Mountains, which were chosen for their relative proximity to St. Louis (where Union Electric was based) and the favorably large elevation differentials (some approaching 1,000 feet (300 m)).

Sverdrup-Parcel & Associates intended to recommend Taum Sauk Mountain as the site, in part because it was the highest point in Missouri at 1,752 feet (534 m), but strong political opposition to development of the scenic mountain (which was later incorporated into a state park) ruled it out. The nearby Proffit Mountain ended up being an excellent alternative thanks to its comparable elevation (1,720 feet (520 m), the 6th-highest point in Missouri), its close proximity to the East Fork of the Black River, and the reasonably short distance of 27 miles (43 km) to the existing power transmission grid.

=== Construction ===
Construction on Taum Sauk began in 1960. The construction team consisted of Fruin-Colnon Construction and the Utah Construction and Mining Company. It went into operation in 1963 with two reversible pump-turbine units that could each generate 175 megawatts (235,000 hp) of power. It was not licensed by the US Federal Power Commission (the predecessor of the Federal Energy Regulatory Commission) because Union Electric contended that the FPC did not have jurisdiction over the non-navigable headwaters where the power station was constructed. In FPC v. Union Elec. Co., 381 U.S. 90 (1965), the United States Supreme Court held that the FPC did have jurisdiction and that Taum Sauk did require a FPC license. Although designed and built without federal supervision, a license was retroactively granted.

At its completion, the Taum Sauk plant was by far the largest pumped storage plant in North America in a number of measures, and was considered a major milestone in the development of pumped storage technology. Its pump-turbines were the largest ever produced at the time of construction, it had an unusually high head (the highest in the US at the time, far surpassing all previous US pumped storage projects), a large storage capacity (it has been described as "the first of the large capacity pumped-storage stations to begin operation in the United States"), black start capability, and had the unique ability to be operated either remotely by remote human operators in off-site facilities located 90–120 miles away (at St. Louis or Osage Power Plant/Bagnell Dam) or even fully automatically with zero human intervention. Taum Sauk was also the first pure pumped storage plant in the United States.

=== Upgrades ===
The pump-turbine units were uprated in July 1972 from their initial rating of 175 MW each to 204 MW each, increasing the plant's overall rating from 350 MW to 408 MW.

From 1998–1999, the turbine runners for both units were upgraded, resulting in improved flow rates and another power uprate to 225 MW per unit (450 MW total).

Minor leaks in the reservoir led to the construction of a collection pond and pumpback station to collect and return leaked water to the reservoir. Later, to reduce leakage, Geo-Synthetics installed lining material in the reservoir itself from September 13 to November 15, 2004.

The plant was named an IEEE Milestone in October 2005, just months before the upper reservoir failed. It was subsequently rededicated as an IEEE Milestone in 2010 after the new upper reservoir dam was completed.

=== 2005 upper reservoir failure ===
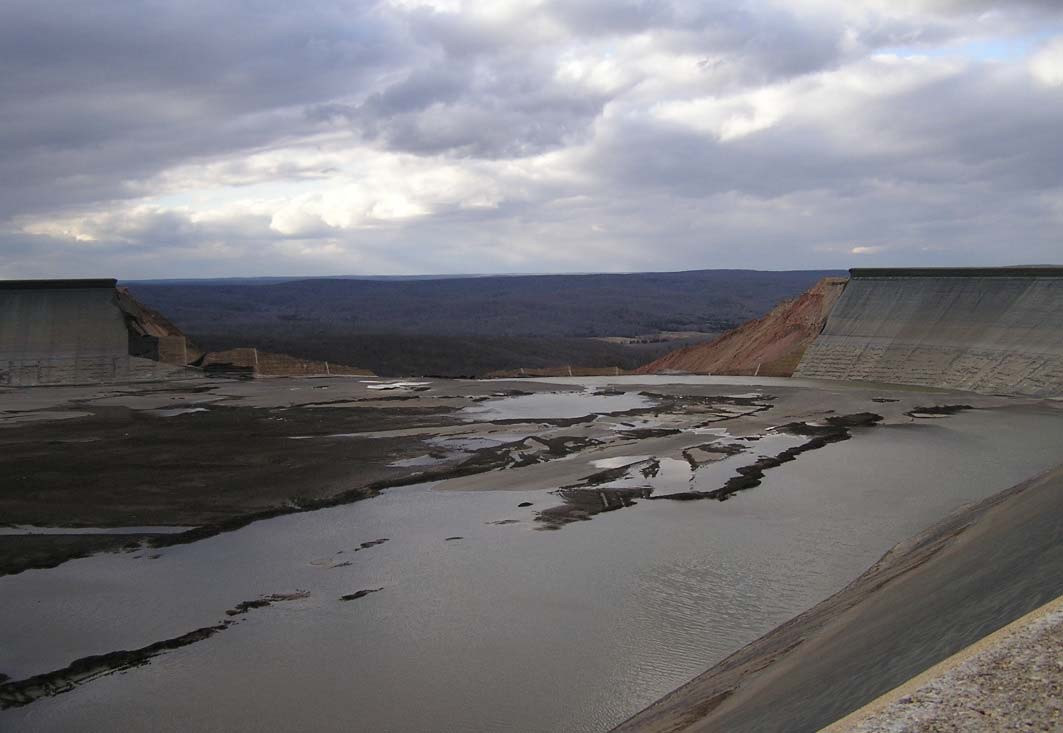
In 2005, a large section of the upper reservoir failed, draining over 1 billion US gallons (3.8 gigalitres) of water in less than half an hour.

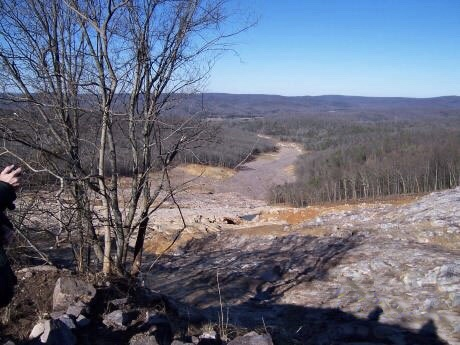
A broad swath of dense forest was washed away and scoured to bedrock by the escaping flow.

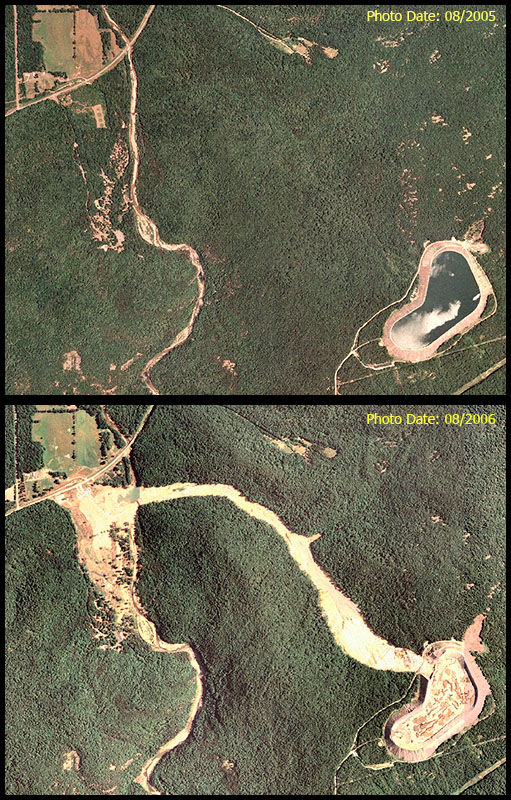
Aerial photos show the upper reservoir before and after its failure.

At 5:12 a.m. on December 14, 2005, the northwest side of the upper reservoir was overtopped when water continued to be pumped from the lower reservoir after the upper was full. This led to the catastrophic failure of a triangular section of the reservoir wall and the release of 1 billion US gallons (3,800,000 m^{3}) of water in 12 minutes. The sudden release sent a 20-foot (6 m) crest of water northwest of the reservoir about 1.75 mi (3 km) down the ridge to the East Fork of the Black River inside the north upstream side of Johnson's Shut-Ins State Park. The river at the park is normally very shallow with rapids running over granite boulders. The flood destroyed many of the structures in the park and forced the closing of the trail connecting it to Taum Sauk Mountain.

A combination of design and construction flaws, continuing to operate the dam when the primary system for gauging the water level was known to be inaccurate (gauge pipes had become detached), moving the "failsafe" secondary gauging system above the actual height of the dam to avoid false positives, and operating the dam in an unsafe manner by routinely overfilling the reservoir caused the upper reservoir dam to overtop. There was no overflow spillway in the original reservoir.

A memo from Richard Cooper, superintendent of hydroelectric plant, indicated that the reservoir had a "Niagara Falls" style overflow on September 27 at the same spot that was breached (caused by wave action related to winds from Hurricane Rita). Another Cooper memo had also indicated that Cooper had warned that gauges used to monitor the water height in the reservoir were malfunctioning in October.

No one was killed by the failure. The superintendent of Johnson's Shut-Ins and Taum Sauk State Parks, Jerry Toops, his wife and three children were swept away when the wall of water obliterated their home. They survived, suffering from injuries and exposure. The children were transported to a hospital in St. Louis and later released. One child was treated for severe burns which resulted from heat packs applied by rescue workers as treatment for hypothermia.

The flood continued downstream 4.3 miles (6.9 km) on the East Fork of the Black River to the dam on the river supplying the Lower Reservoir for plant. The dam of the lower reservoir, which by design is able to hold much of the capacity of the upper reservoir, withstood the onslaught of the flood. By storing most of the deluge it spared towns downstream, including Lesterville and Centerville, from a damaging flood. A voluntary evacuation order was issued for those areas, but there was no damage. The high water was totally stopped at Clearwater Lake 29 miles (47 km) below the Lower Reservoir, the dam of which was not damaged by the rising waters.

==== Litigation and investigations ====
The US Federal Energy Regulatory Commission (FERC) fined Ameren US$15 million pursuant to a settlement for the breach at Taum Sauk—a US$10 million civil penalty combined with the requirement to pay US$5 million into interest-bearing escrow in order to fund a variety of "project enhancements at or near the Taum Sauk project". The US$15 million fine was the largest fine in FERC's history, 30 times larger than the previous record fine of US$500,000.

The State of Missouri sued Ameren for "actual and punitive damages" alleging Ameren was reckless in its operation of the plant.

In 2006, Ameren settled with the Toops family, stating it would pay restitution to the injured family while withholding the terms of the settlement.

The Missouri Highway Patrol delivered a report of its criminal investigation to the Missouri Attorney General in June 2007 which "did not name any suspect" and the attorney general made a statement that there would be no criminal charges. According to press reports, the report states that Ameren failed to provide the identity of the person who raised the gauges meant to prevent overtopping and also states that the gauges were moved before investigators were on the scene.

KMOX radio in St. Louis reported that the US Environmental Protection Agency assisted by the US Attorney's Office for the Eastern District of Missouri had begun an investigation into violations of the Clean Water Act and has requested the Missouri Highway Patrol's report.

The Missouri Public Service Commission (PSC) reopened its investigation and subsequently found the accident to be a failure of Ameren management, stating:

...the Commission can only conclude that the loss of the Taum Sauk plant was due to imprudence on the part of UE (Ameren's AmerenUE Subsidiary). UE was well aware of the catastrophic results likely to occur if the UR (Upper Reservoir) was overtopped by over-pumping. UE knew, or should have known, that storing water against the parapet wall of a rockfill dam was 'unprecedented'. UE knew, or should have known, that operating with a freeboard of only one or two feet left no margin for error and required particularly accurate control of the UR water level. Given that circumstance, UE's decision to continue operating Taum Sauk after the discovery of the failure of the gauge piping anchoring system and the consequent unreliability of the piezometers upon which the UR control system was based is frankly beyond imprudent – it is reckless. UE also knew or should have known that the upper Warrick probes had been reset above the lowest point at the top of the UR." (PSC Report page 71, definitions of Acronyms added)

Ameren had 90 days from the date of the report to tell the PSC how it will meet the recommendations of the report, which include a whistleblower rule, changes in safety management structure, financial accounting for the rebuild of the upper reservoir, and single point of management for the rebuild.

As of 2011, Ameren was reported to have paid a total of close to US$200 million in settlements related to the 2005 breach.

=== Reconstruction ===
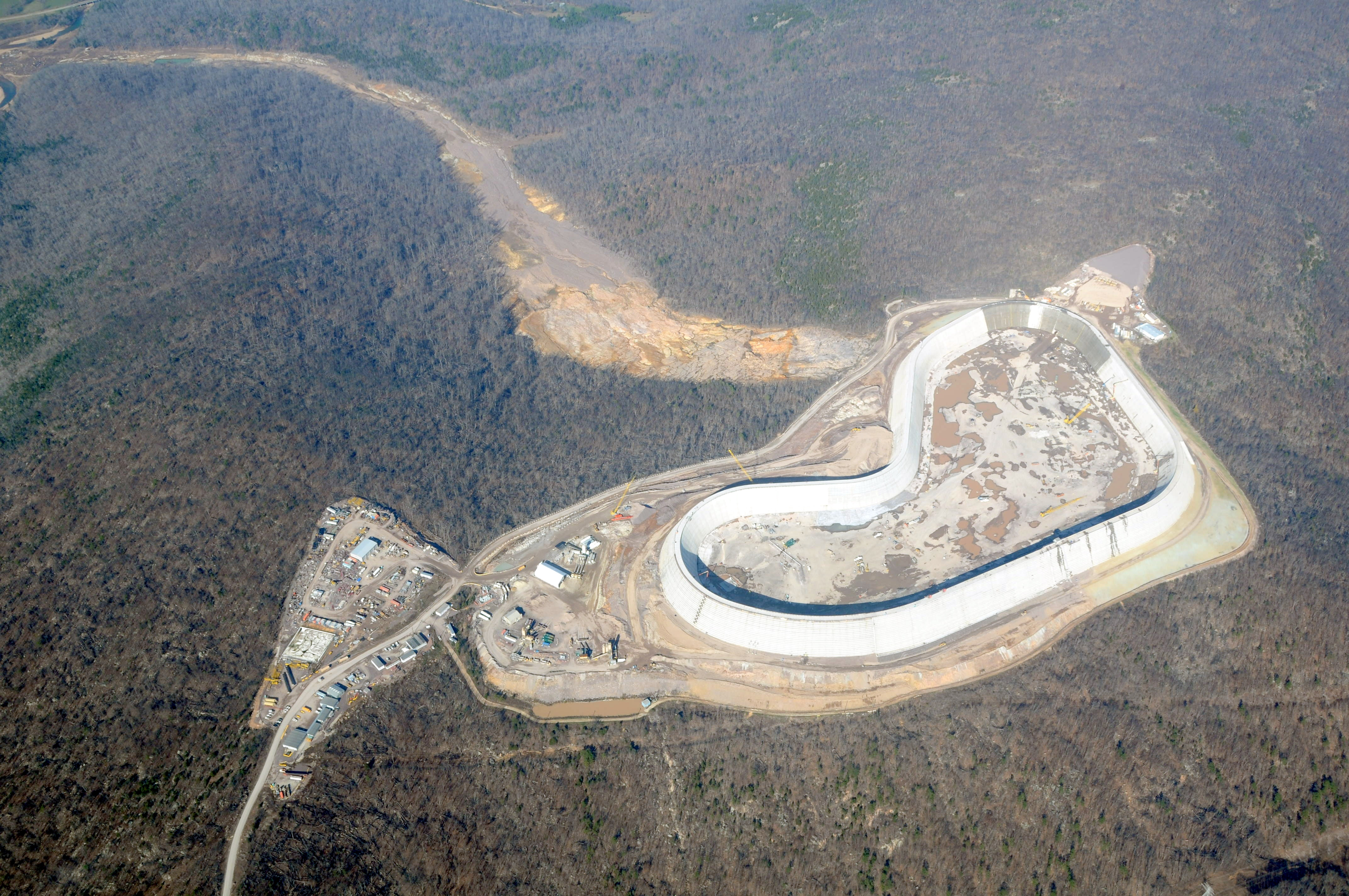
Aerial photo shows reconstruction progress in late November 2009

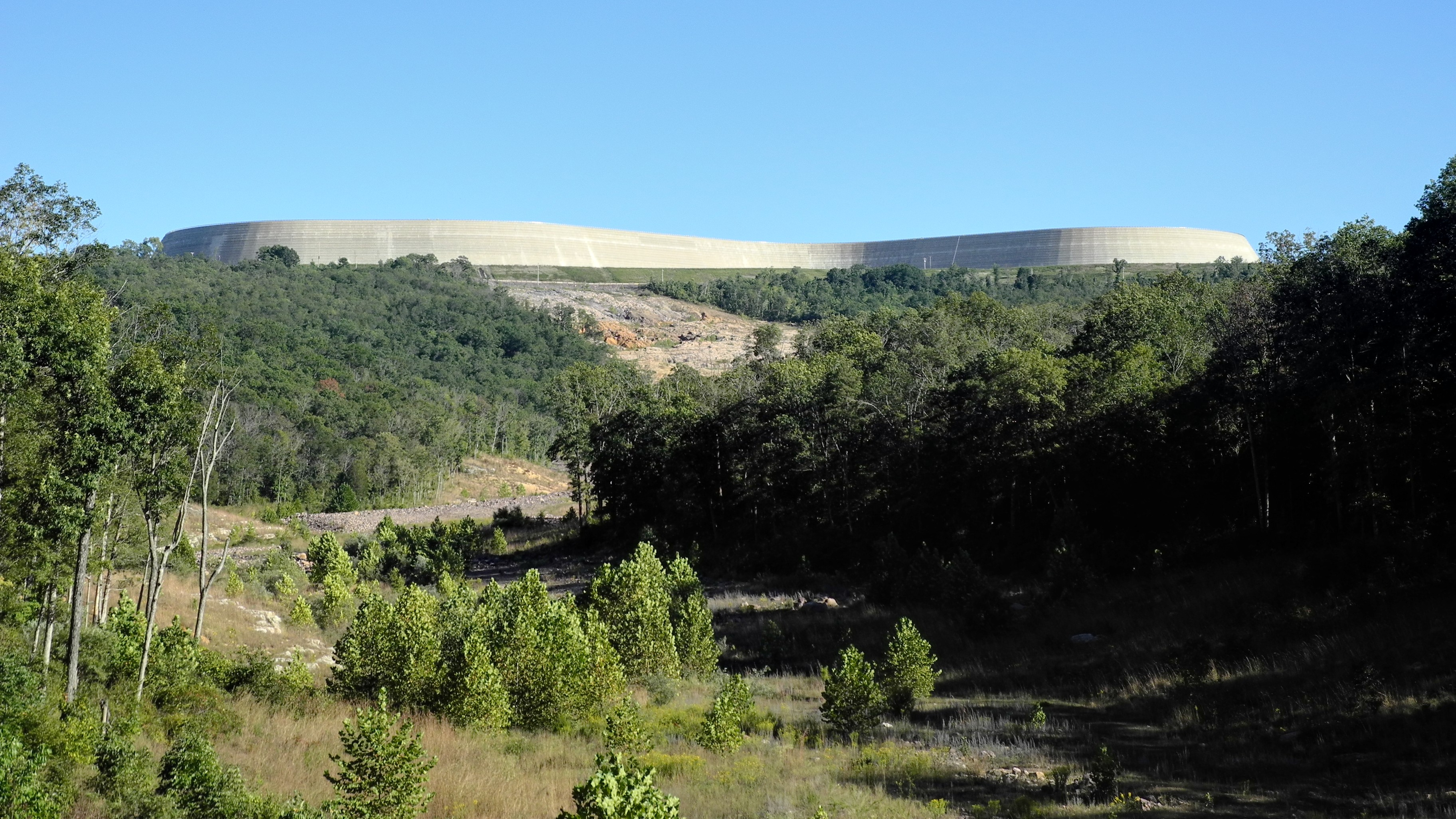
The completed replacement reservoir, viewed from the scour created by the collapse of the original

Water was pumped into the rebuilt reservoir for the first time on February 27, 2010, and engineers monitored the response of the new structure as the water level was repeatedly raised and lowered. The final approval required from the FERC for "return to normal project operations" was received on April 1, 2010. The utility met the Missouri Public Service Commission’s in-service criteria for operations on April 15, and electricity was first generated from the new structure on April 21, 2010. The new dam was recognized by the United States Society on Dams with its "Award of Excellence in the Constructed Project". On September 27, 2010, IEEE rededicated the plant as an IEEE Milestone.

== See also ==
- List of hydroelectric power station failures

== General references ==
- Southeast Missourian (Cape Girardeau, Missouri): Taum Sauk Reservoir fails
- Ameren Press Releases: Media Release Detail, Media Release Detail
- Daily Journal (Park Hills, Missouri): Taum Sauk Dam Fails
- National Weather Service, St. Louis Office: Taum Sauk Dam Failure
- Photos from the USGS Mid-Continent Geographic Science Center
- Johnson's Shut-Ins State Park damage update page
- Ameren web pages on Taum Sauk and Johnson's Shut-ins restoration
