= Proffit Mountain =

Mountain in Missouri, United States

- Location within Missouri

Highest point
- Elevation: 1,700 ft (520 m)
- Prominence: 361 ft (110 m)
- Coordinates: 37°34′8″N 90°46′53″W

Geography
- Location: Reynolds County, Missouri
- Parent range: St. Francois Mountains

Proffit Mountain is a mountain located in Reynolds County, Missouri, the highest in the county. It is the location of the upper reservoir for the Taum Sauk Hydroelectric Power Station.

== See also ==
- List of mountain peaks of Missouri
