= Taum Sauk Mountain State Park =

State park in Missouri, United States

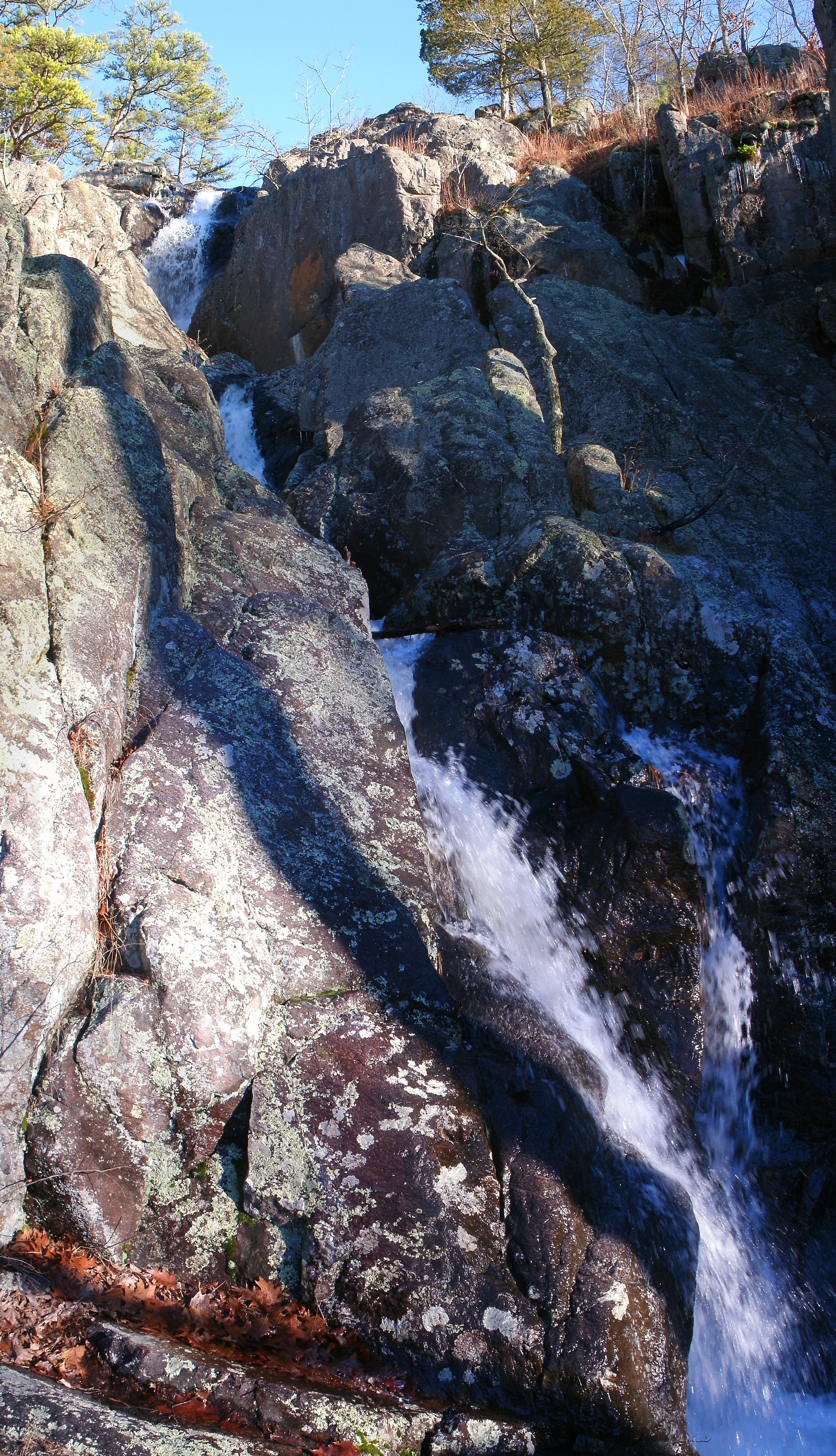
- Mina Sauk Falls during wet weather

- Location within Missouri Location within the United States
- Location: Iron and Reynolds counties, Missouri, United
- Coordinates: 37°34′17″N 90°43′45″W
- Area: 8,395.07 acres (3,397.36 ha)
- Elevation: 1,772 ft (540 m)
- Established: 1991
- Administrator: Missouri Department of Natural Resources
- Visitors: 42,042 (in 2023)
- Website: Official website

Taum Sauk Mountain State Park is a Missouri state park located in the St. Francois Mountains in the Ozarks. The park encompasses Taum Sauk Mountain, the highest point in the state. The Taum Sauk portion of the Ozark Trail connects the park with nearby Johnson's Shut-ins State Park and the Bell Mountain Wilderness Area, which together are part of a large wilderness area popular with hikers and backpackers.

== History ==
In 2005, a mountain top reservoir burst, sending a billion gallons of water through parts of the park and other nearby areas including Johnson's Shut-Ins State Park.

== Activities and amenities ==
The park has a rustic campground, a paved trail to the highpoint, picnic facilities, and a lookout tower providing a view of the dense mountain forest obscured from other vantage points.

=== Mina Sauk Falls ===
Mina Sauk Falls, the highest waterfall in Missouri, is reached via a rugged trail that makes a three-mile (5 km) loop from the highpoint parking area. The falls have cascading waters only during times of wet weather; at other times they are reduced to a trickle or less.

== Gallery ==
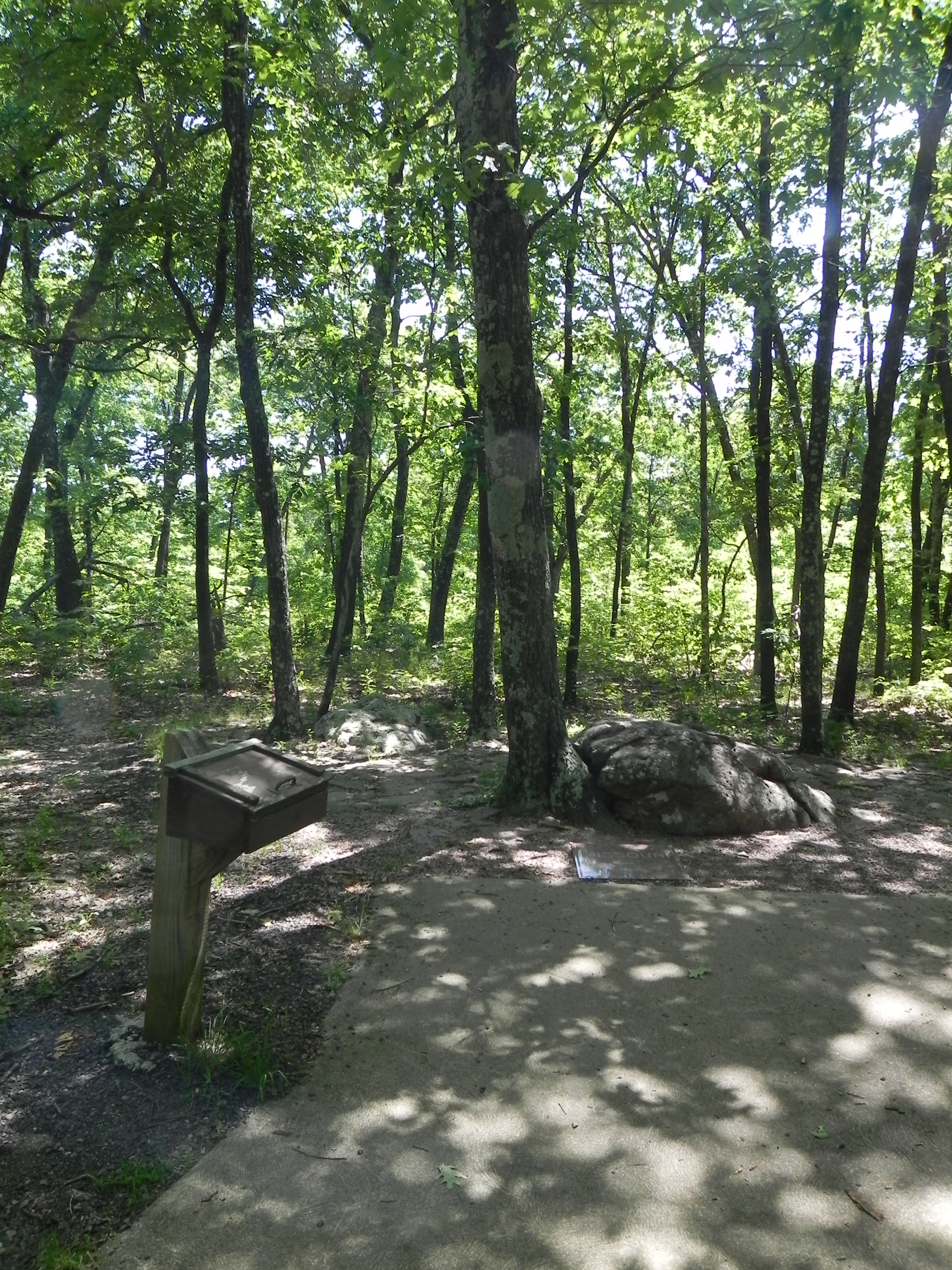
Taum Sauk summit, the highest point in Missouri

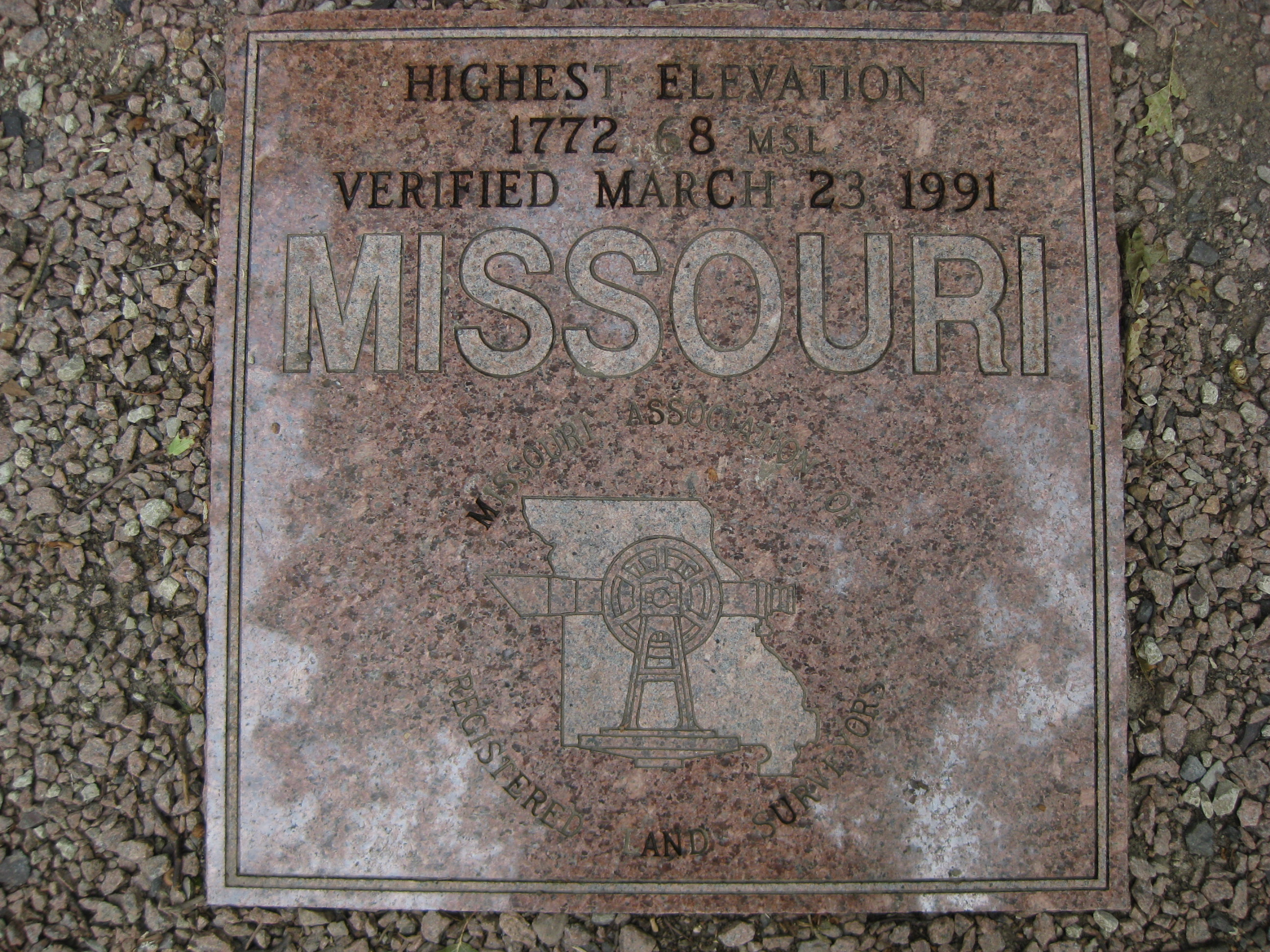
High point plaque on Taum Sauk

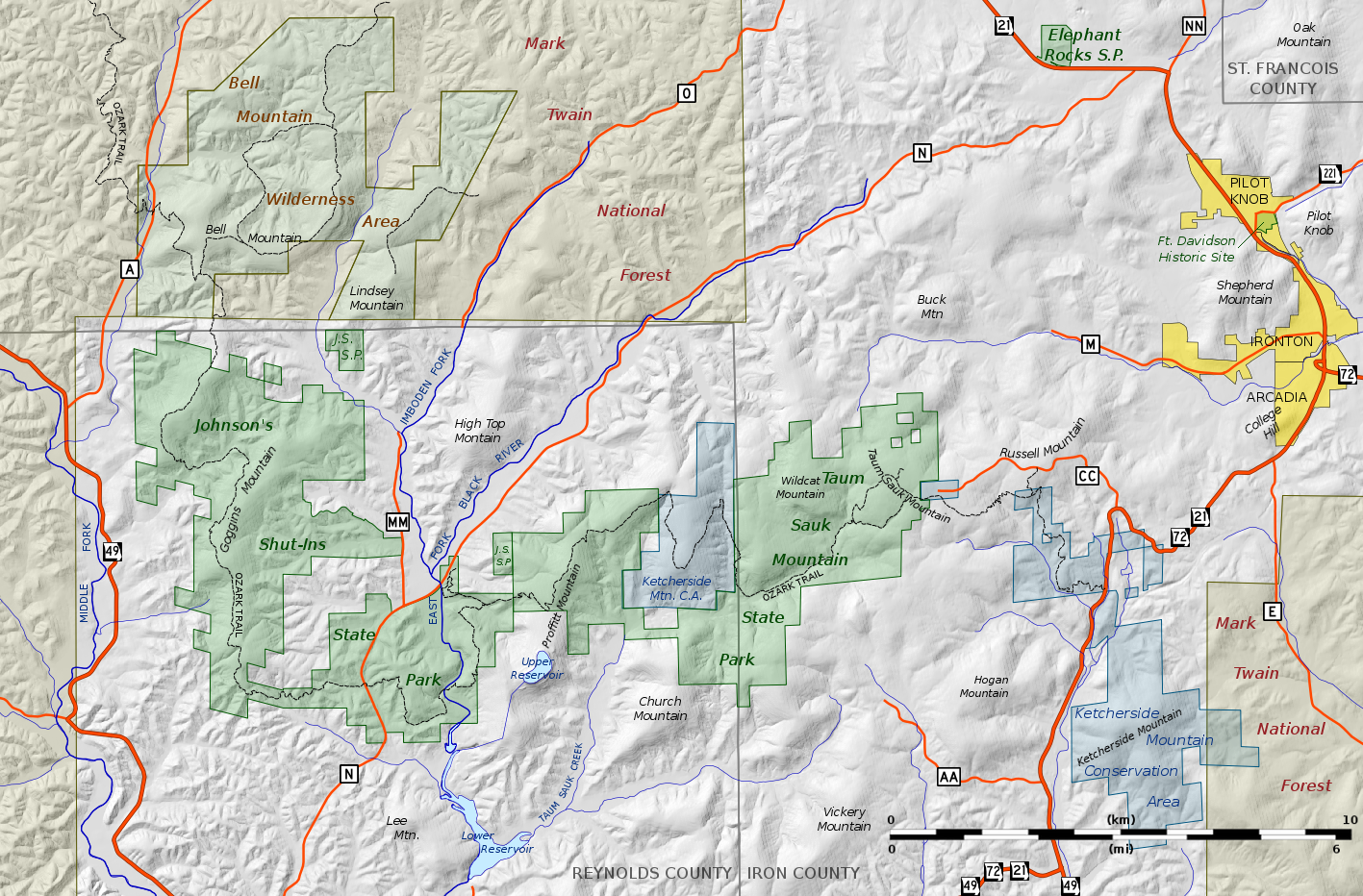
The contiguous Taum Sauk Mountain and Johnson's Shut-ins state parks consist of 16,050 acres (65.0 km^{2}) in the
Missouri Ozarks

== See also ==
- List of waterfalls
