= Spavinaw terrane =

Intrusive and volcanic rocks in the mid-continent region of the United States

The Spavinaw terrane is an occurrence of Proterozoic (1.40–1.35 Ga) intrusive and volcanic rocks in the mid-continent region of the United States. The terrane extends across southern Missouri, southern Kansas, northern Arkansas and much of Oklahoma. The rocks are almost entirely known from drill core and only exposed in outcrop near Spavinaw, Mayes County, Oklahoma and parts of the Saint Francois Mountains in Washington County, Missouri. The terrane is composed almost exclusively of essentially unaltered intrusive granites and volcanic rhyolite and rhyolite tuffs.

The terrane is 100 m.y. younger than the Saint Francois terrane of southeast Missouri, but older than tholeiitic basalts and rhyolites of Middle Proterozoic Midcontinent Rift System.
