= Buford Mountain Conservation Area =

Protected land in Missouri, U.S.

- IUCN category IV (habitat/species management area)
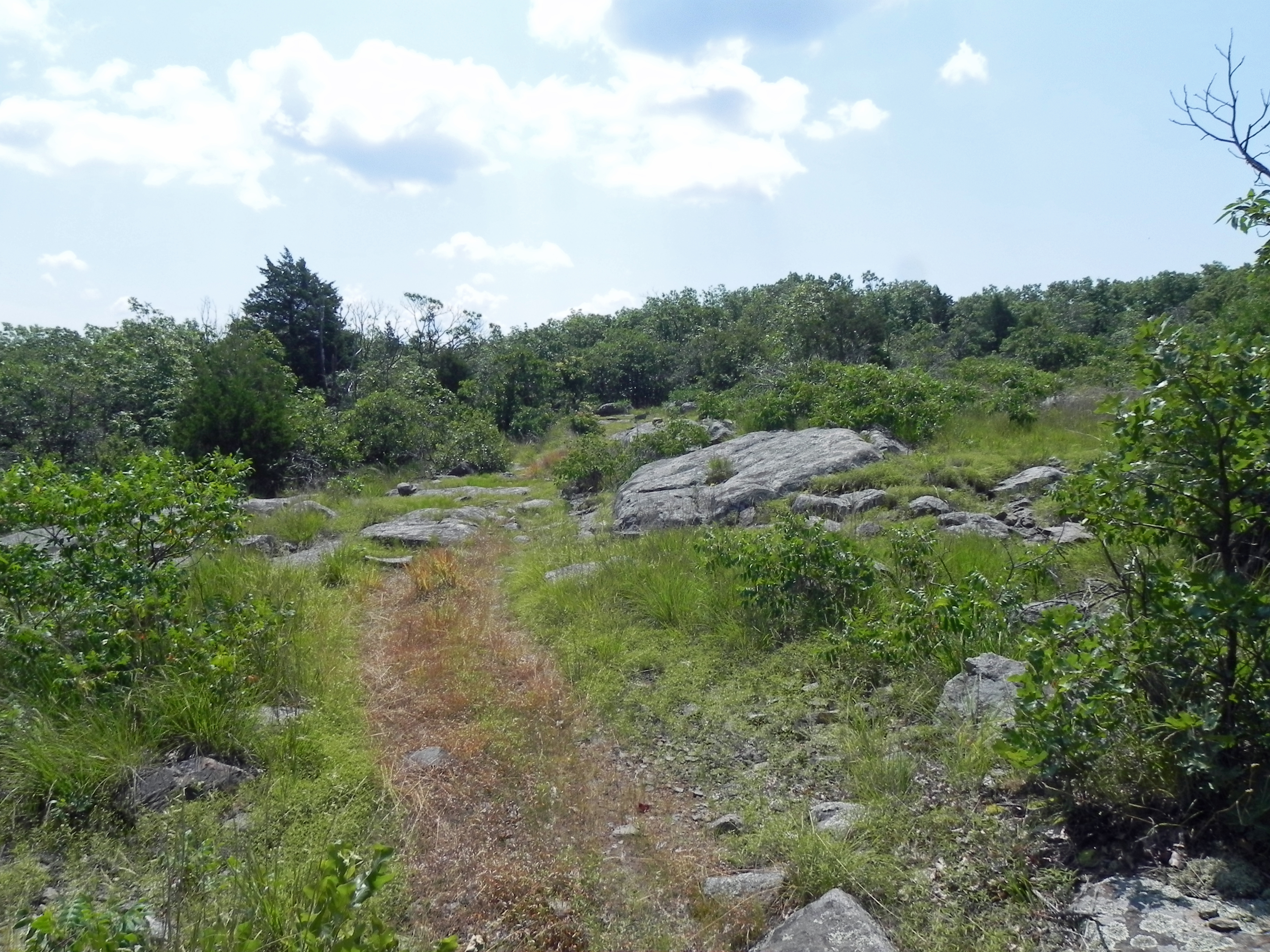
- Buford Mountain Trail on Bald Knob

- Location within Missouri
- Location: Iron and Washington counties, Missouri, United States
- Nearest city: Bismarck, MO
- Coordinates: 37.714339°N 90.703133°W
- Area: 3,824 acres (15.5 km^{2})
- Established: 1983
- Governing body: Missouri Department of Conservation
- Website: Official website

Buford Mountain Conservation Area consists of 3,824 acres (15.48 km^{2}) north of Ironton and southwest of Bismarck, Missouri. The area includes Buford Mountain at 1,740 feet (530 m) above sea level. The mountain consists mostly of rhyolite, with few permanent water sources. However, there are eight fishless ponds each about 0.25 acres (0.10 ha) in size.

The central feature, Buford Mountain, has the name of the local Buford family who settled the area. The Missouri Department of Conservation purchased the area from the Nature Conservancy in 1979. There is a hiking trail that traverses the area for 10.5 miles (16.9 km) and crosses the summit of Buford Mountain. Hunting is permitted in the area in the appropriate season with permits.

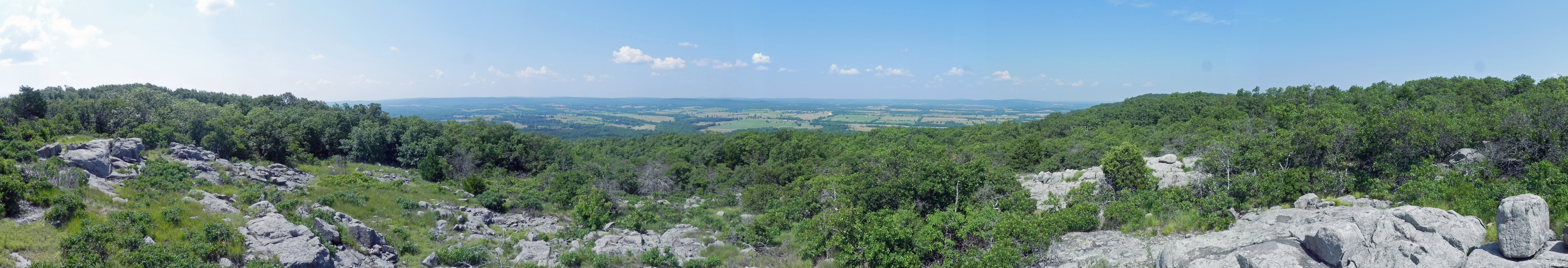
View west from Bald Knob
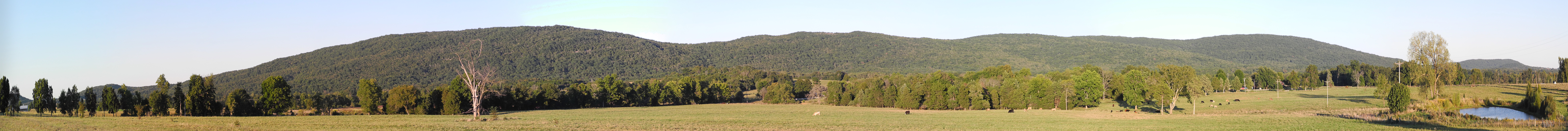
Buford Mountain viewed from Belleview Valley looking east

== See also ==
- List of mountain peaks of Missouri
