= Bell Mountain Wilderness =

Protected area in Missouri, US

- IUCN category Ib (wilderness area)
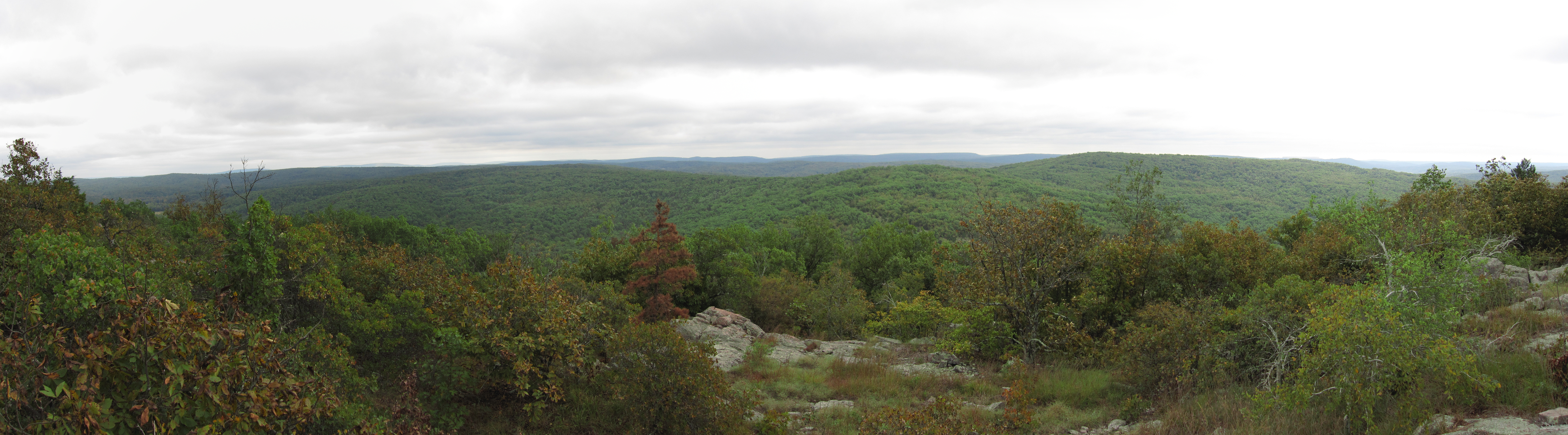
- View east to Lindsey Mountain from glade on Bell Mountain, November 2010

- Location within the United States
- Location: Iron County, Missouri, United States
- Nearest city: Potosi, Missouri
- Coordinates: 37°37′53″N 90°52′37″W
- Area: 9,143 acres (3,700 ha)
- Established: 1980
- Governing body: U.S. Forest Service

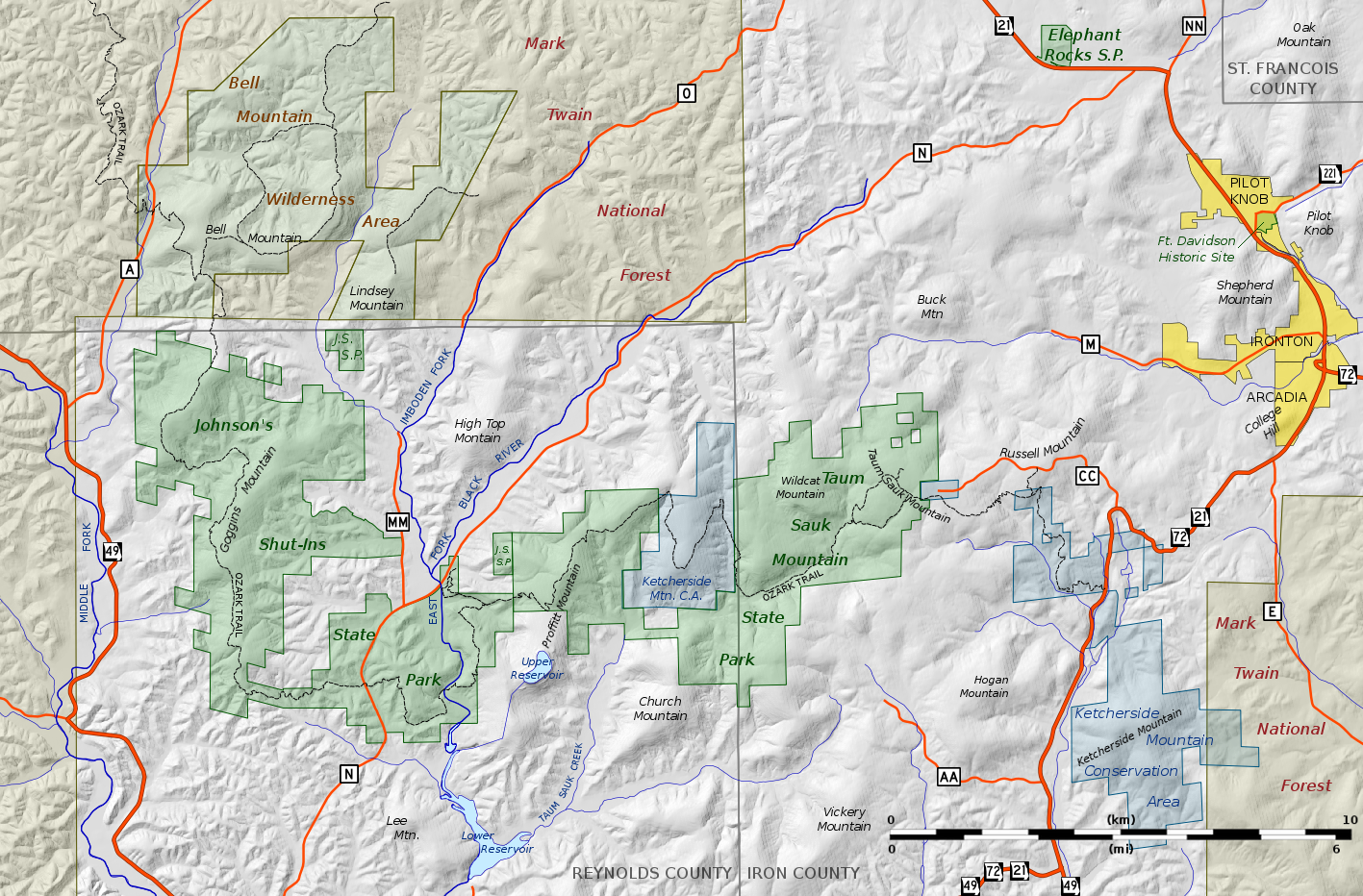
Bell Mountain Wilderness is northwest of Johnsons Shut-Ins and Taum Sauk state parks.

Bell Mountain Wilderness is a protected area in Missouri that is maintained by the United States Forest Service and was designated as such by the United States Congress in 1980. The wilderness area now has a total of 9,143 acres (3,700 ha). Bell Mountain is located within the Potosi-Fredericktown Ranger District of the Mark Twain National Forest, south of Potosi, Missouri in the United States. The Bell Mountain Wilderness is one of eight wilderness areas protected and preserved in Missouri. The area is popular for hiking, including a section of the Ozark Trail.

== Etymology ==
The namesake Bell Mountain has the name of Henry Bell, a pioneer settler.

== Description ==
Bell Mountain Wilderness lies in the Saint Francois Mountains and it was named after its highest point, Bell Mountain, which is 1,702 ft (519 m) tall. Several state lands are designated in this parks-and-wilderness area which includes Johnson's Shut-Ins State Park, Taum Sauk Mountain State Park, and several conservation areas.

== Geography ==
Bell Mountain Wilderness is situated in the northern portion of Iron County, along the Reynolds County border. It is in the northeastern portion of the Ozarks. Two permanent streams flows southwesterly through the area, Joes Creek and Shut-in Creek. The other named mount in the wilderness area is Lindsey Mountain, which is 1,663 ft (507 m) tall, and is located in the southeast portion of Bell Mountain.

== Recreation ==
Hiking is the most notable recreation activity available at Bell Mountain Wilderness; part of the nationally recognized Ozark Trail is located in the southwestern portion of the area. There are 11.9 miles (19.2 km) of trails present. Wildlife viewing is unique in this area of the Missouri Ozarks due to the relatively limited tree clearing for this old growth forest.

== See also ==
- List of U.S. Wilderness Areas
- List of mountain peaks of Missouri
