= Brown Mountain (St. Francois County, Missouri) =

Mountain in Missouri, United States of America

Coordinates: 37°40′57″N 90°35′56″W

Brown Mountain is a summit in western St. Francois County in the U.S. state of Missouri. The peak has an elevation of 1,650 feet (500 m). The community of Iron Mountain Lake lies just west of the mountain. The mountain is named after Mr. Brown, a businessperson in the local charcoal producing industry.

== See also ==
- List of mountain peaks of Missouri
