= Black Mountain (Missouri) =

Landform in Missouri, U.S.

Coordinates: 37°28′09″N 90°29′46″W

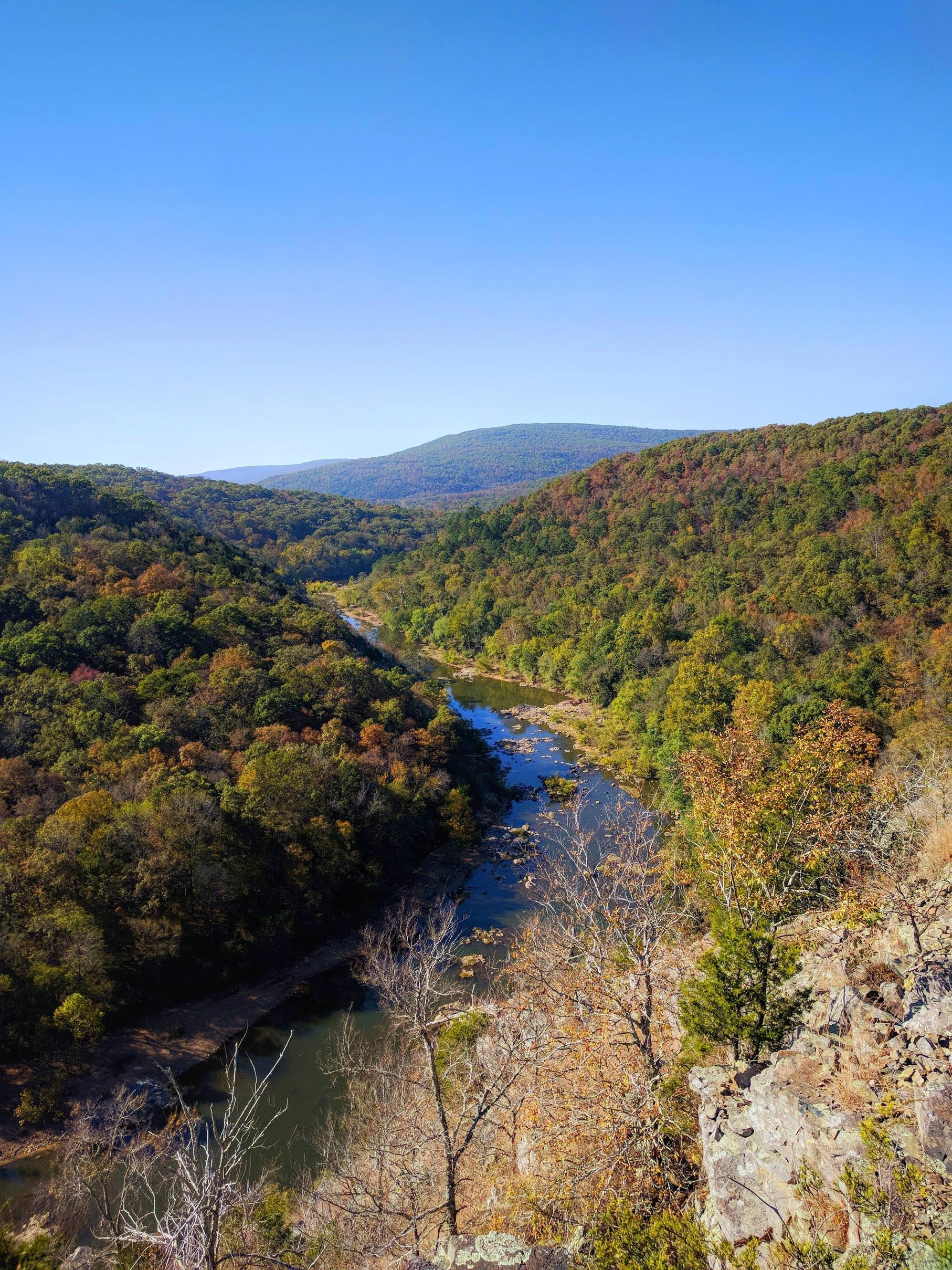
Black Mountain, with the St. Francis River in the foreground

Black Mountain is a summit in western Madison County in the U.S. state of Missouri. The peak has an elevation of 1,503 feet (458 m). The St. Francis River flows past the east side of the mountain at an elevation of about 560 feet. Missouri Route E passes the east and south side of the mountain. The community of French Mills lies adjacent to the St. Francis just to the south of the mountain.

Black Mountain has the name of the local Black family.

== See also ==
- List of mountain peaks of Missouri
