= List of Missouri state parks =

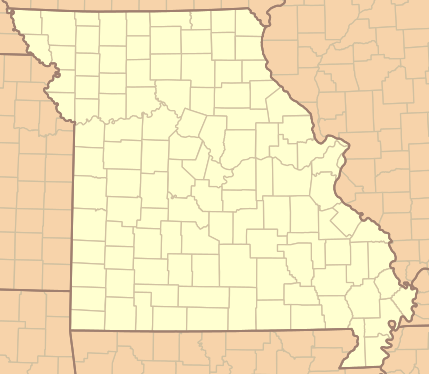
Map of Missouri State Parks (red) and
State Historic Sites (blue)

This is a list of state parks and state historic sites in Missouri. In the U.S. state of Missouri both state parks and state historic sites are administered by the Division of State Parks of the Missouri Department of Natural Resources. As of 2026 the division manages a total of 93 parks and historic sites plus the trails at Roger Pryor Pioneer Backcountry, which together total more than 160,000 acres (65,000 ha). According to the state, its parks system includes approximately 3,500 campsites, 194 cabins, and 1,000 miles (1,600 km) of trails, including the longest developed rails-to-trail project in the nation.

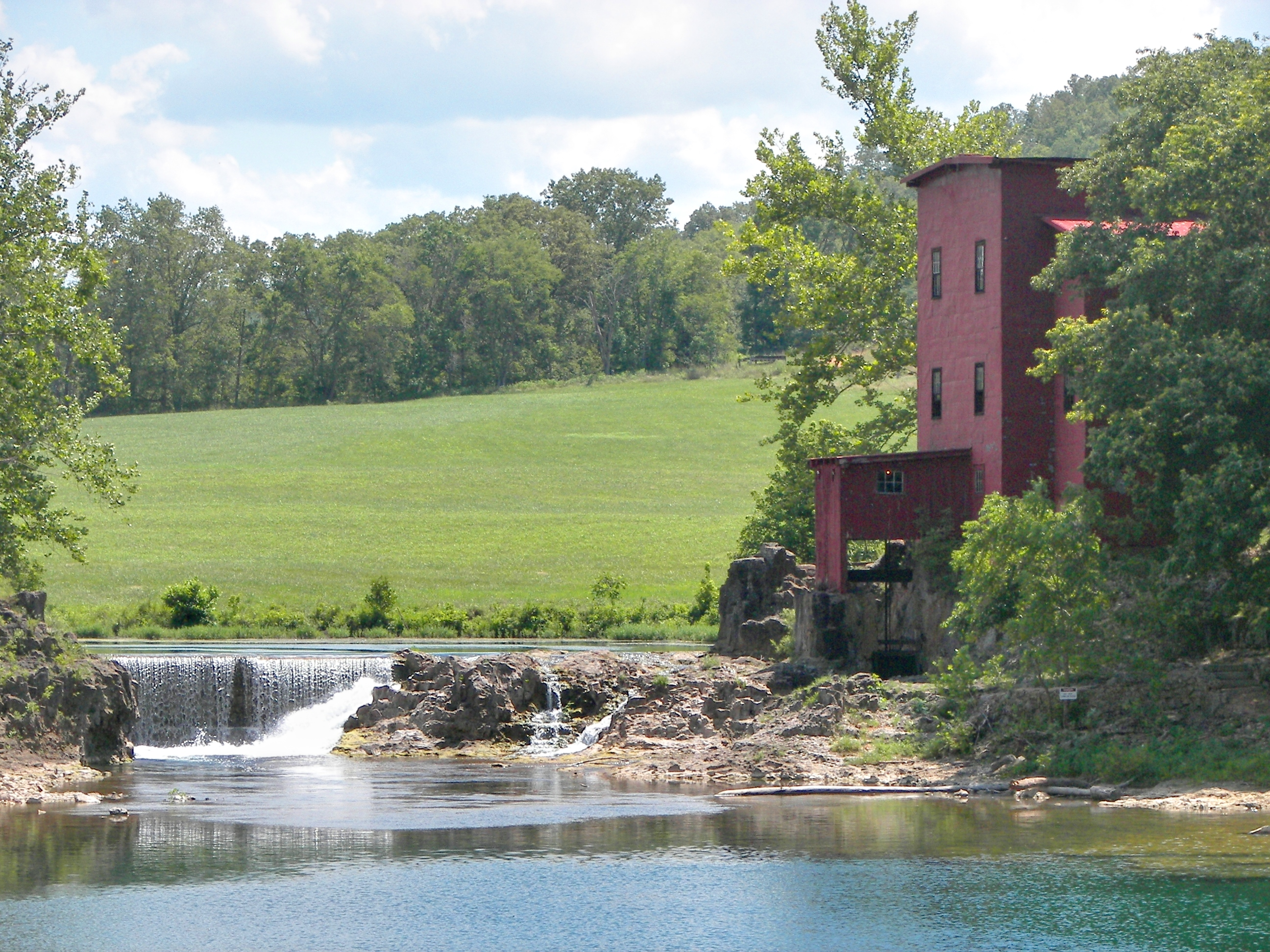
Dillard Mill

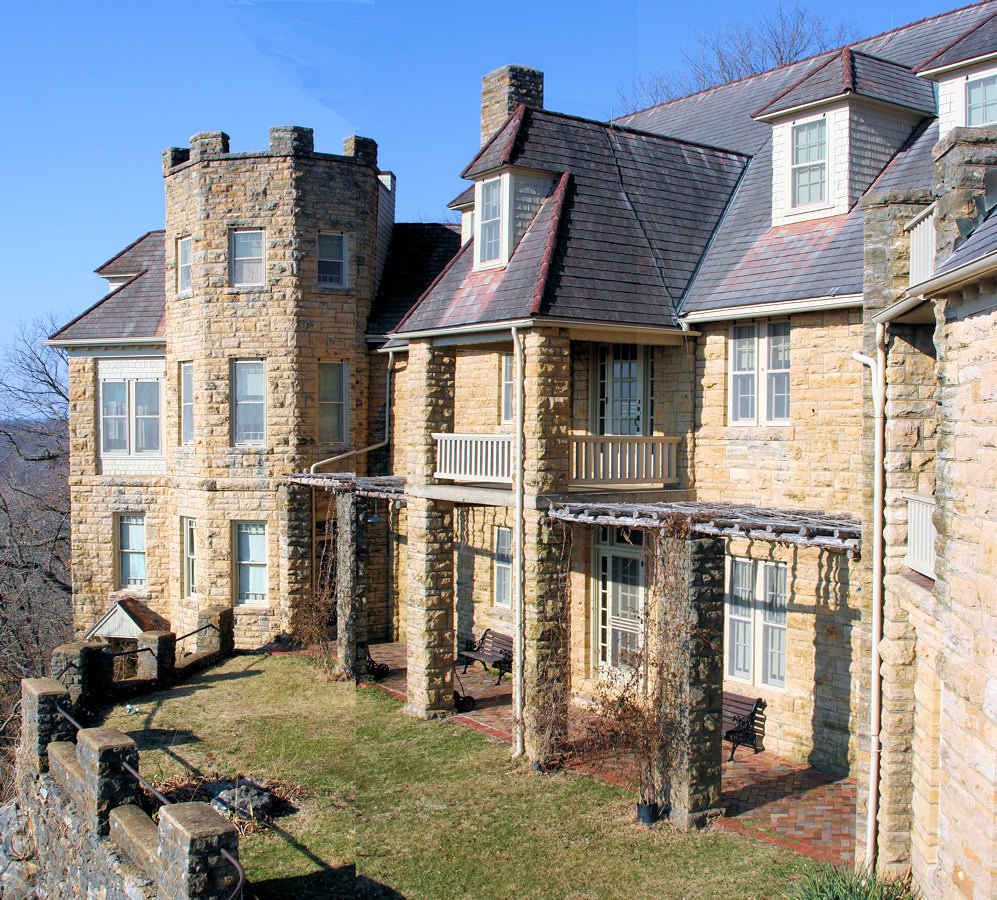
Bothwell Lodge

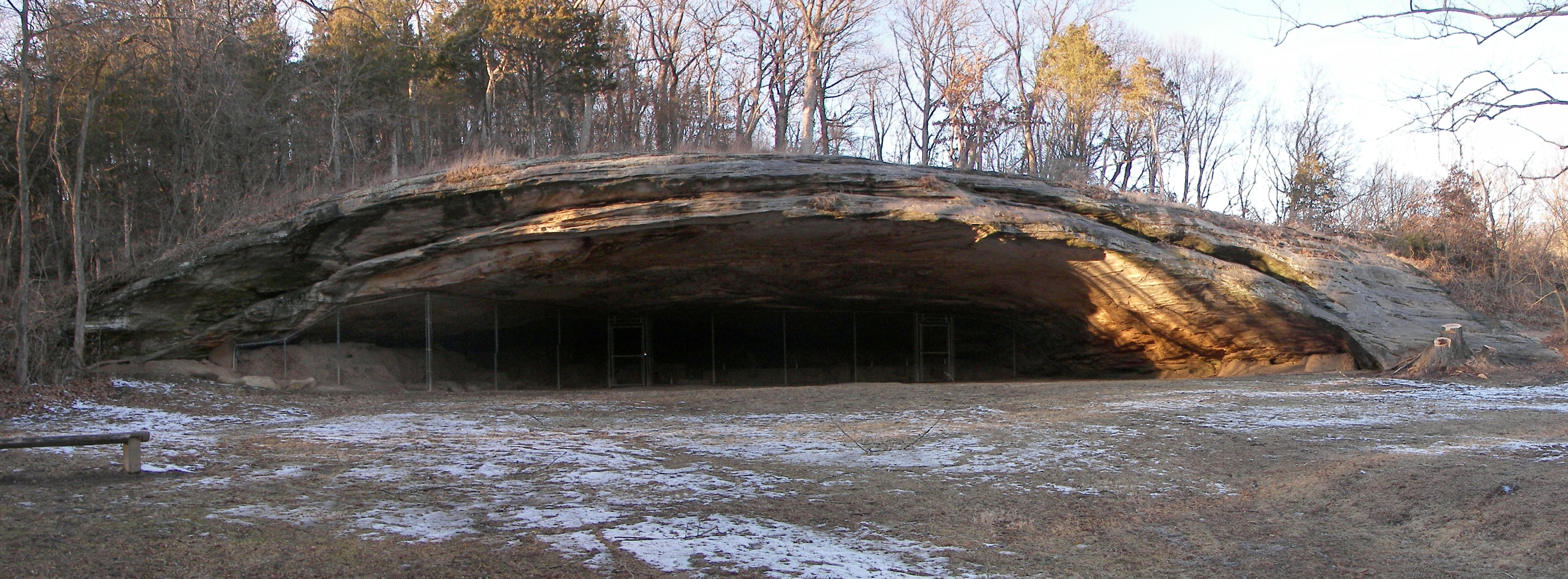
Graham Cave

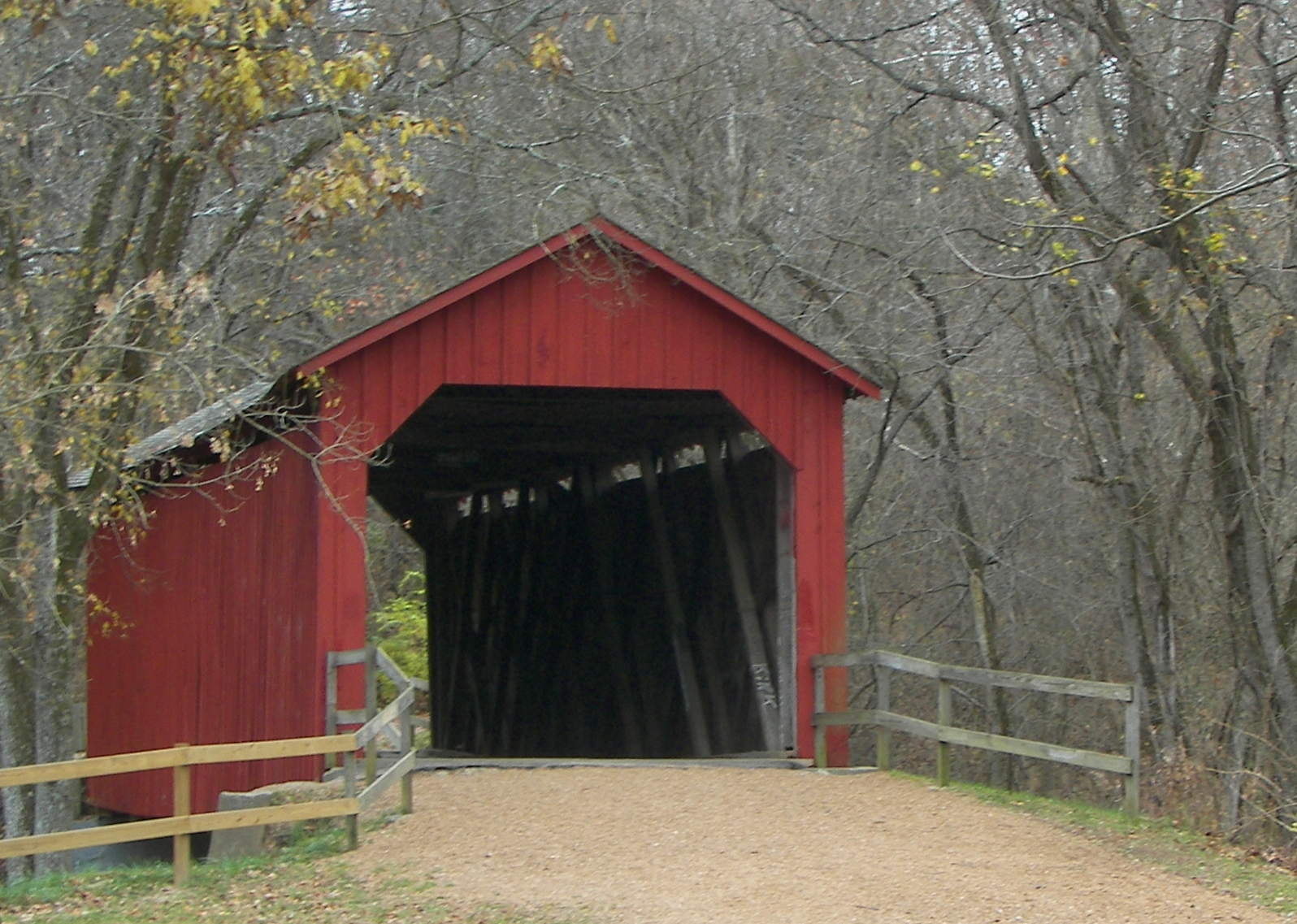
Sandy Creek Covered Bridge

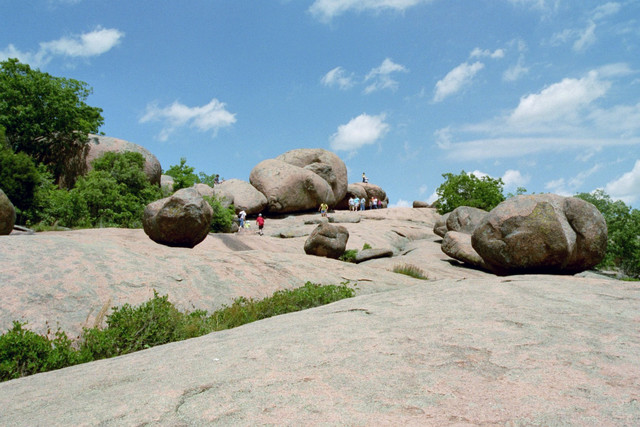
Elephant Rocks

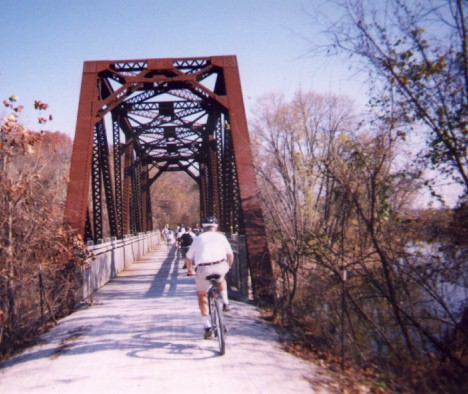
Katy Trail

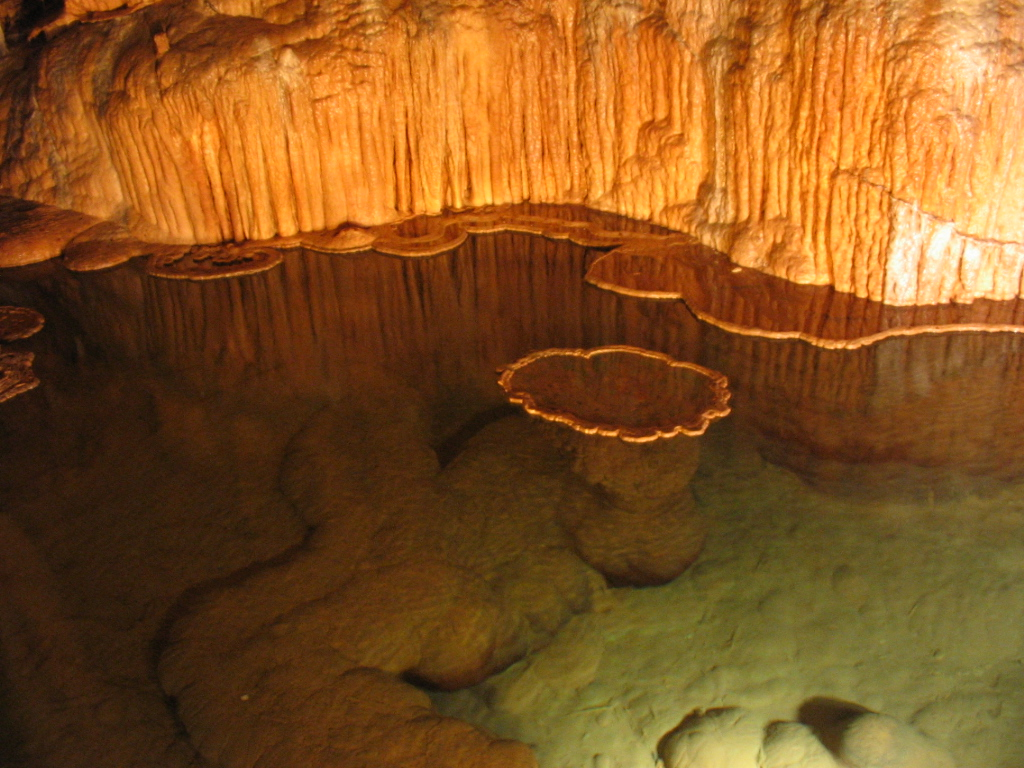
Onondaga Cave

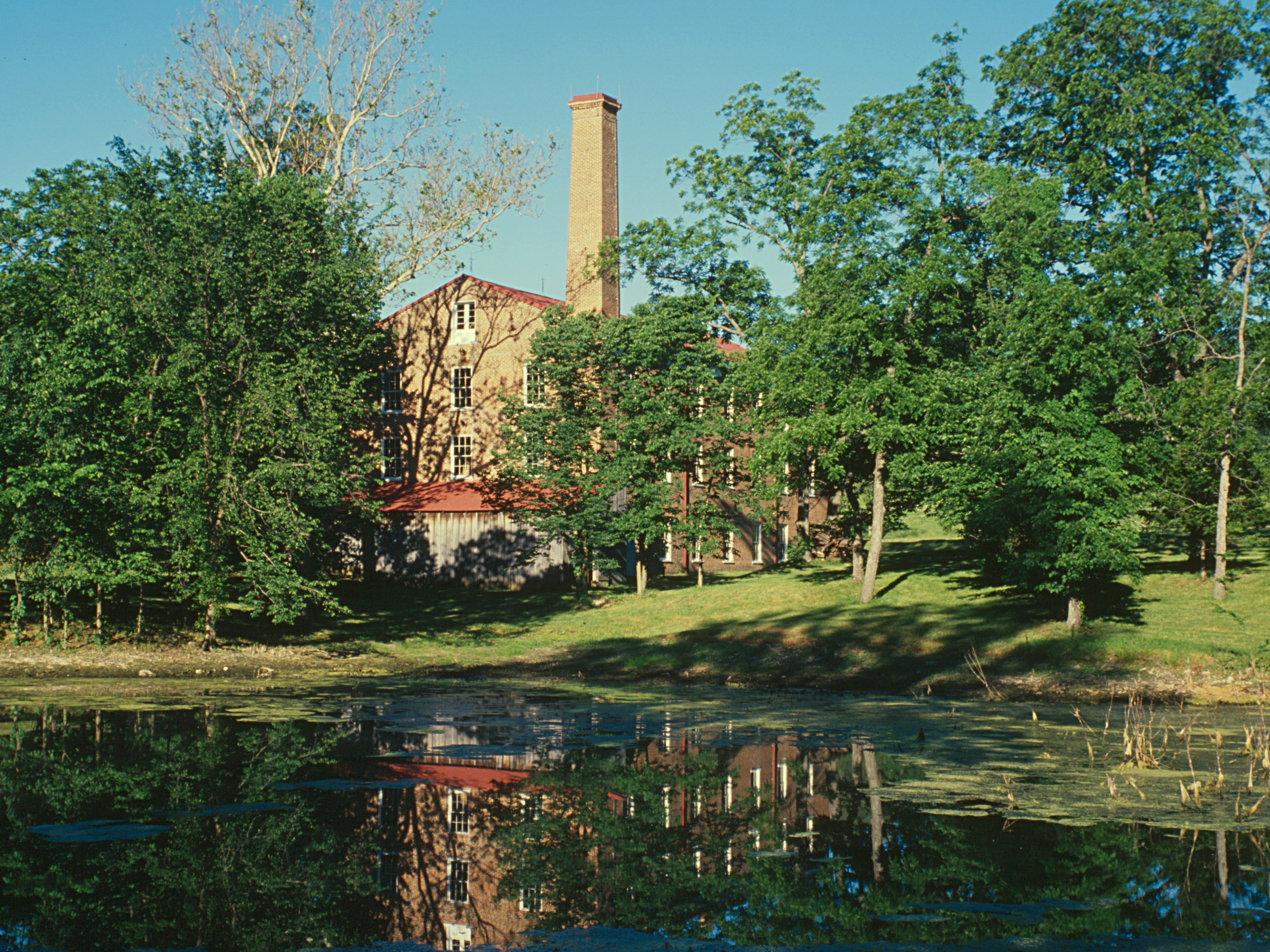
Watkins Woolen Mill

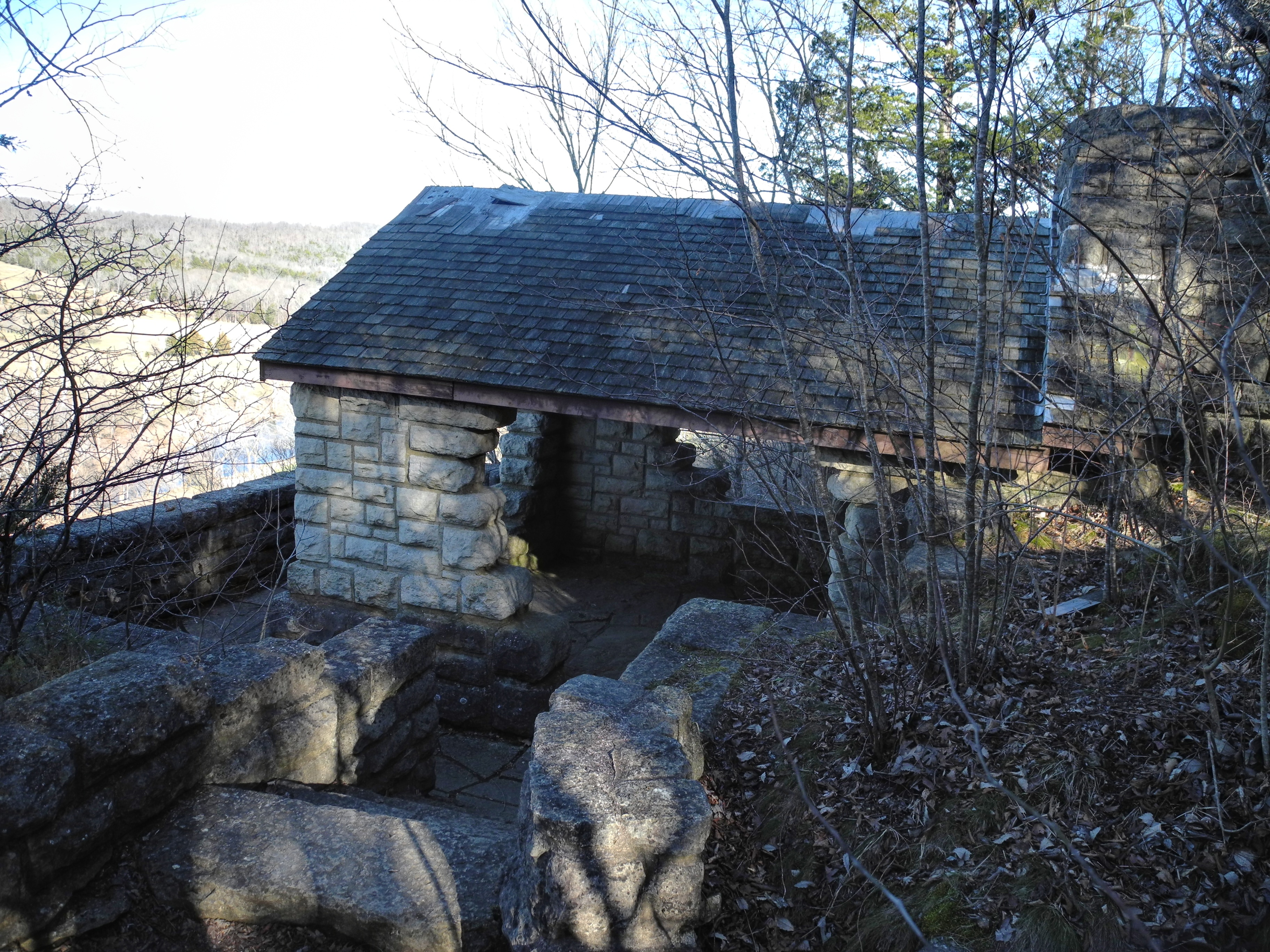
Washington State Park

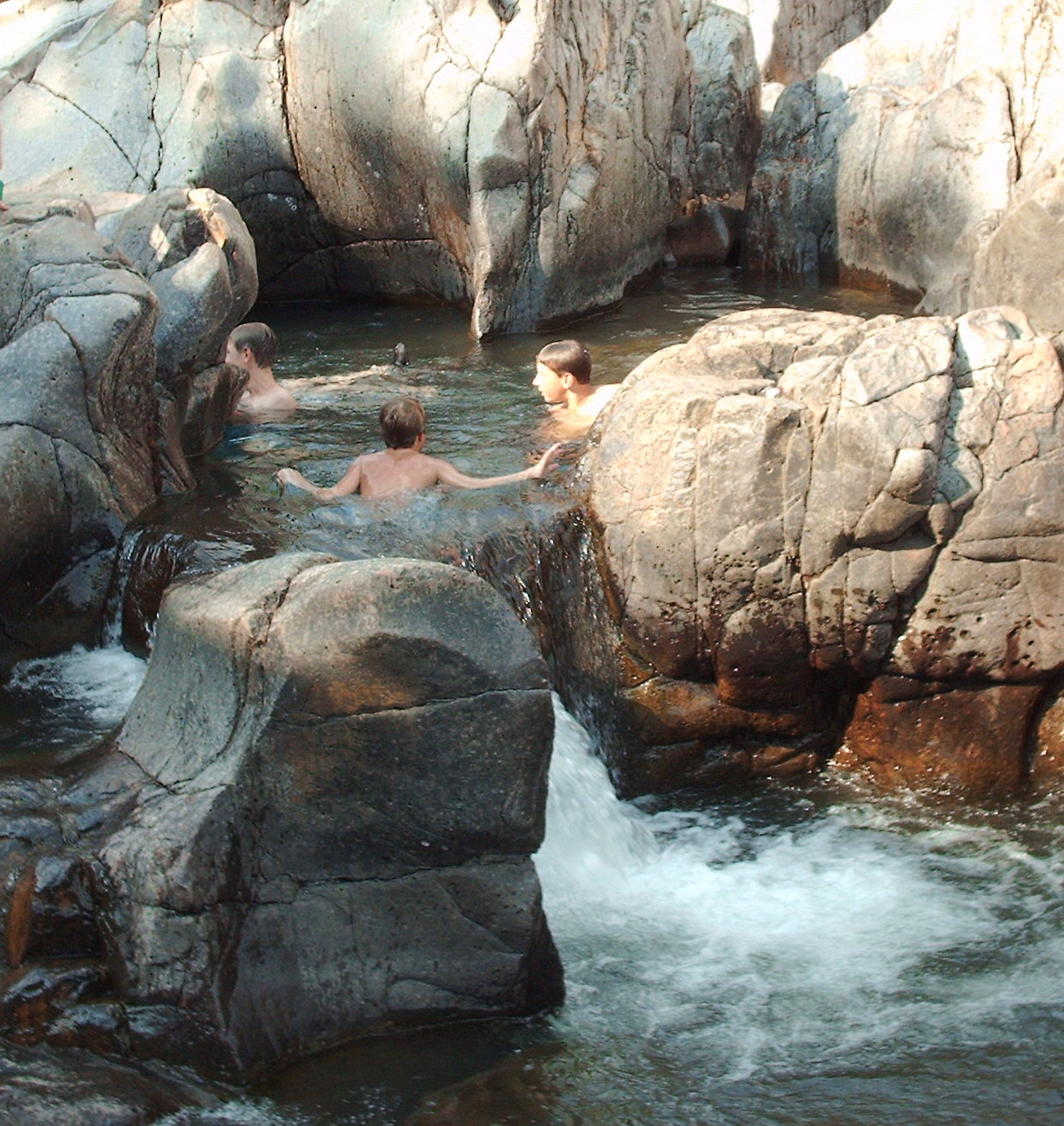
Johnson's Shut-ins

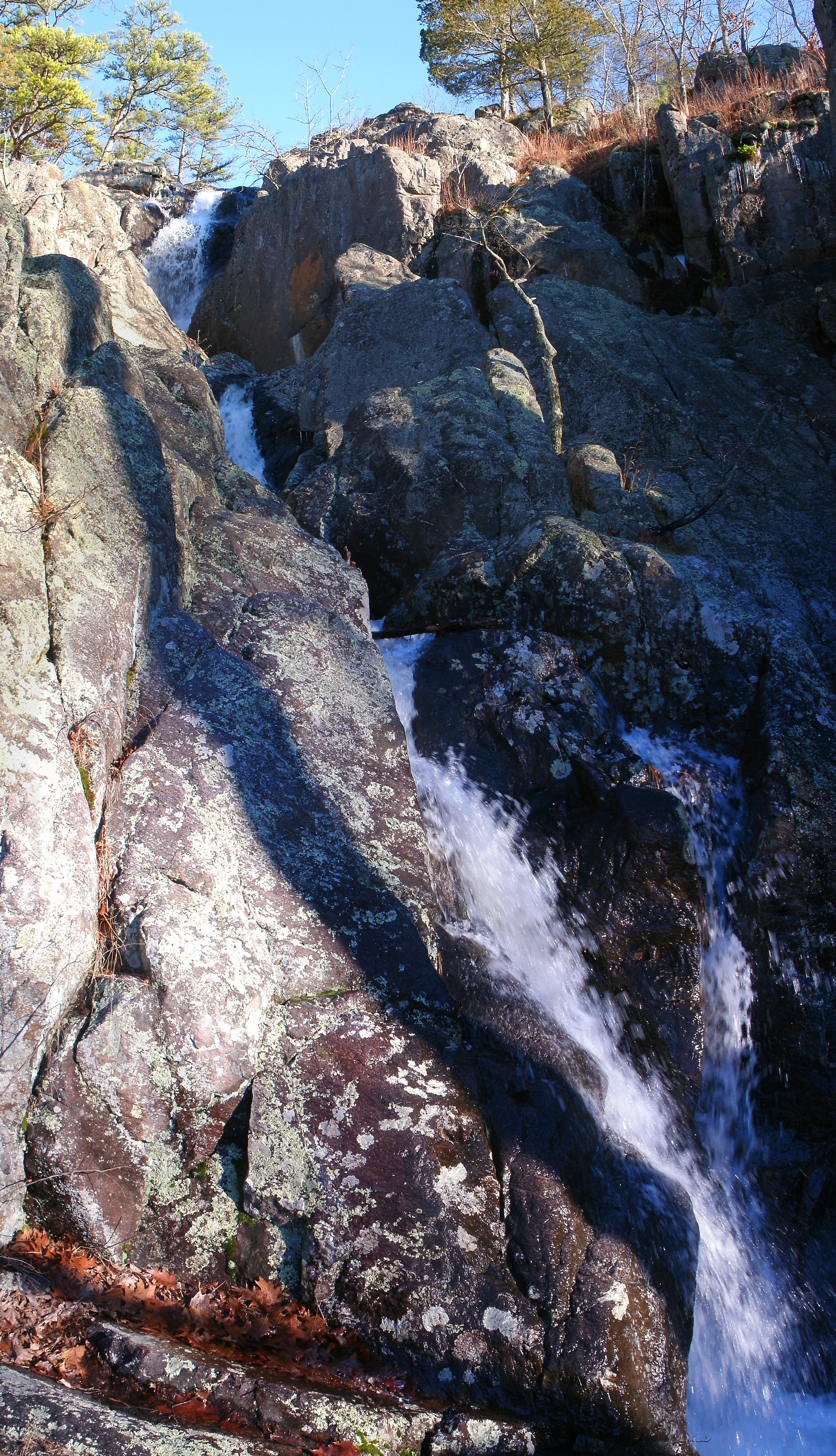
Taum Sauk Mountain State Park

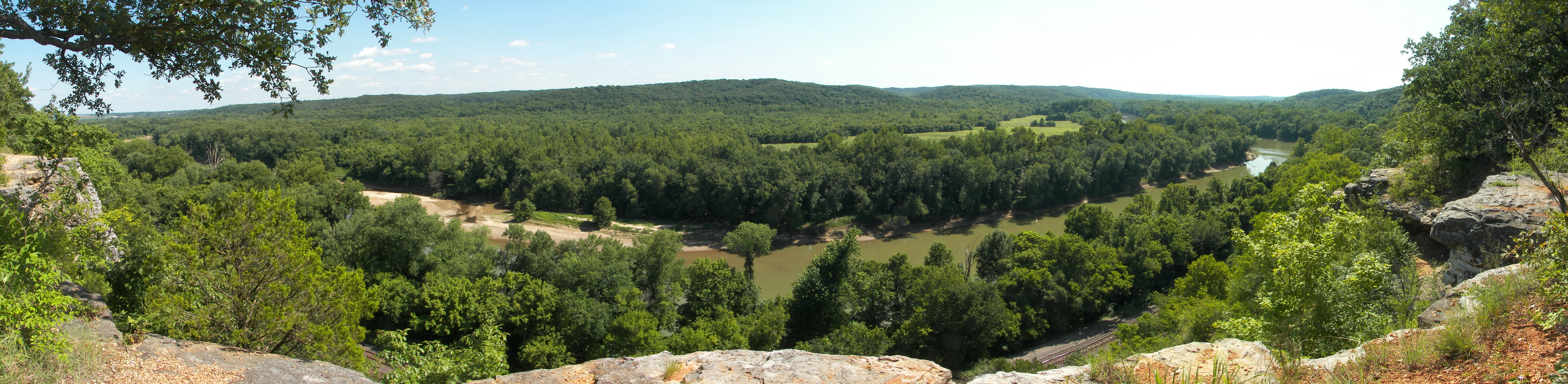
Castlewood State Park

== State parks ==
Name	County	Size		Estab- lished
Dr. Edmund A. Babler Memorial State Park	St. Louis	2,441 acres	988 ha	1937
Sam A. Baker State Park	Wayne	5,323.62 acres	2,154.39 ha	1926
Bennett Spring State Park	Dallas, Laclede	3,216.74 acres	1,301.77 ha	1923
Big Lake State Park	Holt	407.41 acres	164.87 ha	1932
Big Oak Tree State Park	Mississippi	1,028.68 acres	416.29 ha	1937
Big Sugar Creek State Park	McDonald	2,082.54 acres	842.77 ha	1992
Bryant Creek State Park	Douglas	2,917 acres	1,180 ha	2016
Castlewood State Park	St. Louis	1,818.3 acres	735.8 ha	1974
Crowder State Park	Grundy	1,912.10 acres	773.80 ha	1938
Cuivre River State Park	Lincoln	6,393.94 acres	2,587.54 ha	1946
Current River State Park	Shannon	780 acres	320 ha	2008
Echo Bluff State Park	Shannon	410 acres	170 ha	2016
Elephant Rocks State Park	Iron	131.74 acres	53.31 ha	1967
Eleven Point State Park	Oregon	4,167 acres	1,686 ha	2016
Finger Lakes State Park	Boone	1,128.69 acres	456.76 ha	1973
Graham Cave State Park	Montgomery	369.51 acres	149.54 ha	1964
Grand Gulf State Park	Oregon	321.96 acres	130.29 ha	1984
Ha Ha Tonka State Park	Camden	3,709.74 acres	1,501.28 ha	1978
Hawn State Park	Ste. Genevieve	4,953.66 acres	2,004.68 ha	1955
Johnson's Shut-Ins State Park	Reynolds	8,549.51 acres	3,459.86 ha	1955
Edward "Ted" and Pat Jones-Confluence Point State Park	St. Charles	1,121.43 acres	453.83 ha	2001
Katy Trail State Park	Boone, Callaway, Cooper, Henry, Howard, Montgomery, Pettis, St. Charles, Warren	239.6 mi	385.6 km	1990
Knob Noster State Park	Johnson	3,934.38 acres	1,592.19 ha	1946
Lake of the Ozarks State Park	Camden, Miller	17,626.55 acres	7,133.21 ha	1946
Lake Wappapello State Park	Wayne	1,854.23 acres	750.38 ha	1956
Lewis and Clark State Park	Buchanan	189.13 acres	76.54 ha	1934
Long Branch State Park	Macon	1,828.47 acres	739.96 ha	1983
Meramec State Park	Crawford, Franklin, Washington	6,896.33 acres	2,790.85 ha	1927
Montauk State Park	Dent	1,396.12 acres	564.99 ha	1926
Morris State Park	Dunklin	161.22 acres	65.24 ha	2000
Jay Nixon Backcountry	Reynolds	1,230 acres	500 ha	2017
Onondaga Cave State Park	Crawford	1,317.70 acres	533.25 ha	1982
Pershing State Park	Linn	3,565.66 acres	1,442.97 ha	1937
Pomme de Terre State Park	Hickory	734.44 acres	297.22 ha	1960
Prairie State Park	Barton	3,942 acres	1,595 ha	1980
Roaring River State Park	Barry	4,093.38 acres	1,656.53 ha	1928
Robertsville State Park	Franklin	1,224.65 acres	495.60 ha	1979
Don Robinson State Park	Jefferson	843 acres	341 ha	2012
Rock Bridge Memorial State Park	Boone	2,272.83 acres	919.78 ha	1967
Rock Island Trail State Park	Cass, Henry, Johnson	47.5 mi	76.4 km	2016
Route 66 State Park	St. Louis	418.61 acres	169.41 ha	1997
St. Francois State Park	St. Francois	2,734.97 acres	1,106.80 ha	1964
St. Joe State Park	St. Francois	8,242.98 acres	3,335.82 ha	1976
Shepherd of the Hills State Park	Taney	1,011 acres	409 ha	2016
Stockton State Park	Cedar	2,175.90 acres	880.56 ha	1969
Table Rock State Park	Stone, Taney	356.03 acres	144.08 ha	1959
Taum Sauk Mountain State Park	Iron, Reynolds	7,501.09 acres	3,035.58 ha	1991
Thousand Hills State Park	Adair	3,079.70 acres	1,246.31 ha	1952
Trail of Tears State Park	Cape Girardeau	3,415.39 acres	1,382.16 ha	1957
Harry S Truman State Park	Benton	1,440 acres	580 ha	1976
Mark Twain State Park	Monroe	2,775.14 acres	1,123.06 ha	1924
Annie and Abel Van Meter State Park	Saline	1,104.63 acres	447.03 ha	1932
Wakonda State Park	Lewis	1,053.87 acres	426.49 ha	1960
Wallace State Park	Clinton	501.61 acres	202.99 ha	1932
Washington State Park	Washington	2,147.57 acres	869.09 ha	1932
Watkins Mill State Park	Clay	1,500.22 acres	607.12 ha	1964
Weston Bend State Park	Platte	1,133.08 acres	458.54 ha	1980

== State historic sites ==
Name	County	Size		Estab- lished
Arrow Rock State Historic Site	Saline	167.39 acres	67.74 ha	1923
Battle of Athens State Historic Site	Clark	408.50 acres	165.31 ha	1975
Battle of Carthage State Historic Site	Jasper	7.4 acres	3.0 ha	1990
Battle of Island Mound State Historic Site	Bates	40 acres	16 ha	2012
Battle of Lexington State Historic Site	Lafayette	92.25 acres	37.33 ha	1958
Battle of Pilot Knob State Historic Site	Iron	77.19 acres	31.24 ha	1968
Thomas Hart Benton Home and Studio State Historic Site	Jackson	0.32 acres	0.13 ha	1977
Bollinger Mill State Historic Site	Cape Girardeau	43 acres	17 ha	1967
Nathan and Olive Boone Homestead State Historic Site	Greene	400.20 acres	161.96 ha	1991
Boone's Lick State Historic Site	Howard	51.17 acres	20.71 ha	1960
Bothwell Lodge State Historic Site	Pettis	246.91 acres	99.92 ha	1974
Clark's Hill/Norton State Historic Site	Cole	13.4 acres	5.4 ha	2002
Confederate Memorial State Historic Site	Lafayette	135.22 acres	54.72 ha	1952
Deutschheim State Historic Site	Gasconade	0.69 acres	0.28 ha	1978
Dillard Mill State Historic Site	Crawford	131.77 acres	53.33 ha	1977
Gov. Daniel Dunklin's Grave State Historic Site	Jefferson	1.37 acres	0.55 ha	1965
First Missouri State Capitol State Historic Site	St. Charles	0.66 acres	0.27 ha	1960
Hunter-Dawson State Historic Site	New Madrid	19.80 acres	8.01 ha	1967
Iliniwek Village State Historic Site	Clark	127.49 acres	51.59 ha	1992
Jefferson Landing State Historic Site	Cole	1.27 acres	0.51 ha	1976
Jewell Cemetery State Historic Site	Boone	0.45 acres	0.18 ha	1970
Scott Joplin House State Historic Site	St. Louis	3.86 acres	1.56 ha	1983
Locust Creek Covered Bridge State Historic Site	Linn	32.22 acres	13.04 ha	1968
Mastodon State Historic Site	Jefferson	425 acres	172 ha	1976
Missouri Mines State Historic Site	St. Francois	25 acres	10 ha	1976
Missouri State Museum	Cole	n/a	n/a	1923
Osage Village State Historic Site	Vernon	100 acres	40 ha	1984
Gen. John J. Pershing Boyhood Home State Historic Site	Linn	2.69 acres	1.09 ha	1952
Sandy Creek Covered Bridge State Historic Site	Jefferson	205.78 acres	83.28 ha	1968
Sappington African American Cemetery State Historic Site	Saline	2 acres	0.81 ha	2021
Sappington Cemetery State Historic Site	Saline	2 acres	0.81 ha	1970
Towosahgy State Historic Site	Mississippi	64 acres	26 ha	1967
Harry S Truman Birthplace State Historic Site	Barton	2.51 acres	1.02 ha	1957
Mark Twain Birthplace State Historic Site	Monroe	13 acres	5.3 ha	1924
Union Covered Bridge State Historic Site	Monroe	1.24 acres	0.50 ha	1967
Felix Vallé House State Historic Site	Ste. Genevieve	10.13 acres	4.10 ha	1970
Watkins Woolen Mill State Historic Site	Clay	1,442 acres	584 ha	1964

== Other facilities ==
Name	County	Size		Estab- lished
Trails of the Roger Pryor Pioneer Backcountry	Dent, Shannon	60,000 acres	24,000 ha	2001
Bruce R. Watkins Cultural Heritage Center	Jackson	n/a	n/a	1989

== See also ==
- List of Missouri state forests
- Lists of state parks by U.S. state
- List of national parks of the United States
