= Bryant Creek State Park =

State park in Missouri, United States

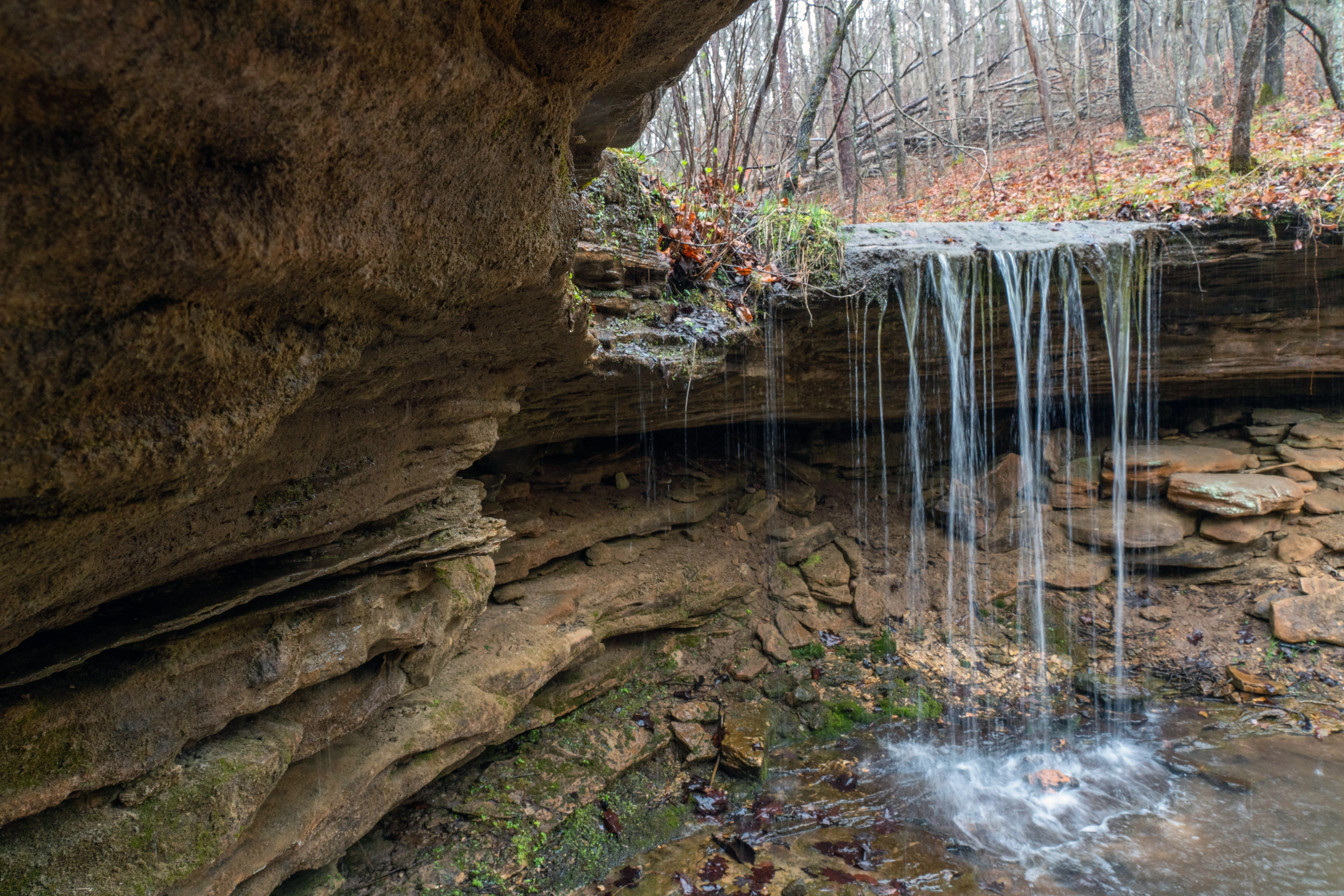

- Location within Missouri Location within the United States
- Interactive map of Bryant Creek State Park
- Location: Douglas County, Missouri, United States
- Coordinates: 36°49′07″N 92°25′20″W
- Area: 2,917 acres (1,180 ha)
- Established: 2016
- Administrator: Missouri Department of Natural Resources
- Visitors: 9,415 (in 2022)
- Website: Official website

Bryant Creek State Park is a 2,917-acre (1,180 ha) public recreation area located along Bryant Creek in south central Douglas County, 22 miles (35 km) southeast of Ava in the Ozarks of southern Missouri. The state park includes some two miles of the meandering channel of Bryant Creek, the dolomite and sandstone bluffs along the river, and the oak and pine forested land adjacent to the river. The park's two hiking trails offer 5.1 miles of trail. The park opened with a ribbon-cutting ceremony in September 2022. It was one of three new Missouri state parks announced in 2016.

On December 31, 2024, Bryant Creek Hills Wild Area was designated as the thirteenth wild area in the Missouri State Parks system. It is located in the state park's northeast quadrant.
