= Watkins Mill =

Watkins Mill may refer to three things in the United States:

- Watkins Woolen Mill State Park and State Historic Site in Missouri
- Watkins Mill High School in Montgomery County, Maryland
- Watkins Mill Town Center, a proposed development in Gaithersburg, Maryland
