= Babler State Park =

State park in Missouri, United States

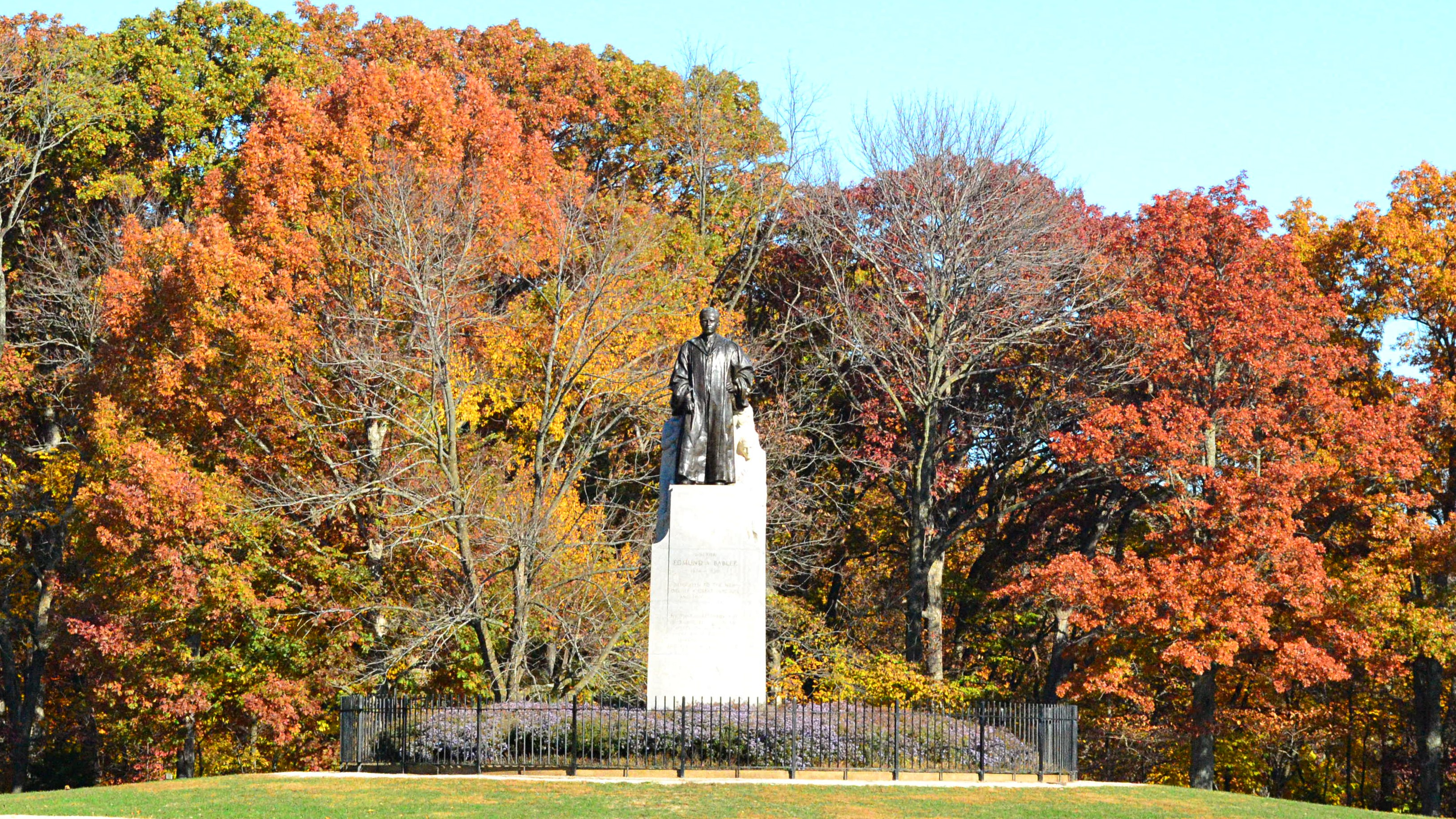
- Statue of Dr. Babler

- Location within Missouri Location within the United States
- Location: Wildwood, Missouri, United States
- Coordinates: 38°37′14″N 90°41′45″W
- Area: 2,441 acres (988 ha)
- Elevation: 587 ft (179 m)
- Established: 1937
- Administrator: Missouri Department of Natural Resources
- Visitors: 533,833 (in 2023)
- Website: Official website
- Dr. Edmund A. Babler Memorial State Park Historic District
- U.S. National Register of Historic Places
- U.S. Historic district
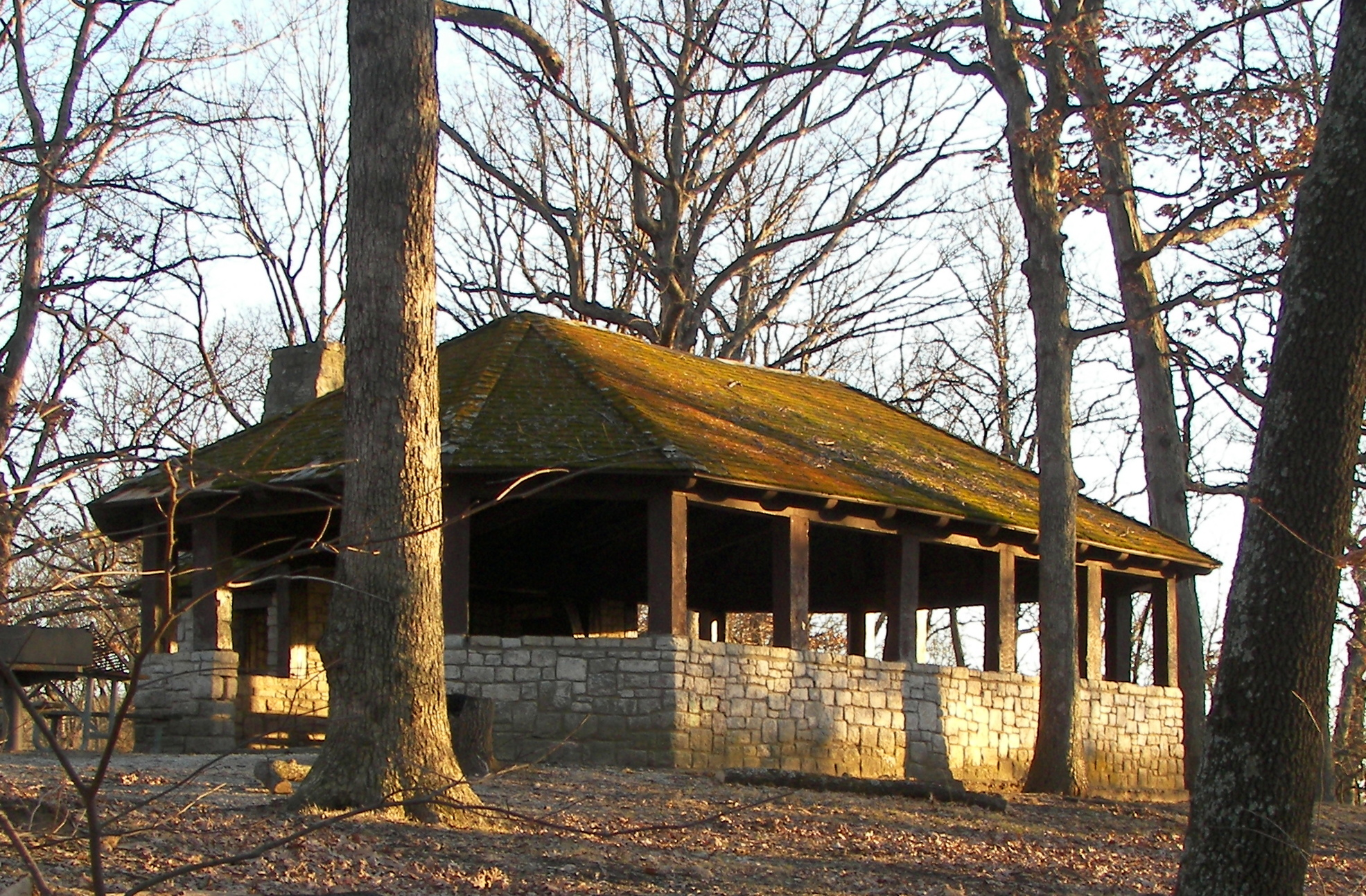
- CCC-constructed pavilion
- Location: Wildwood, Missouri
- Area: 2,325 acres (941 ha)
- Built: 1935
- Architect: CCC
- Architectural style: Rustic
- MPS: ECW Architecture in Missouri State Parks 1933-1942 TR
- NRHP reference No.: 85000539
- Added to NRHP: February 27, 1985

Babler State Park (formally, Dr. Edmund A. Babler Memorial State Park) is a public recreation area located in the northwest section of the city of Wildwood, Missouri. A large bronze statue of Dr. Babler greets park visitors. The state park's 2,441 acres (988 ha) offer opportunities for hiking, picnicking, bicycling, horseback riding, and camping. The park is managed by the Missouri Department of Natural Resources. It was added to the National Register of Historic Places in 1985 as a Historic District.

== History ==
The park was created in memory of Edmund A. Babler, who was born on October 11, 1874, in Appleton City, Missouri. He graduated from Missouri Medical College, now known as Washington University School of Medicine, in 1898, became a general surgeon, developed a large private practice in St. Louis. The stories say that he spent the majority of his time devoting himself to charity cases and took much pride in his work for the unfortunate. His premature death at age 55 from pneumonia was a source of great sadness for his admirers and family. His funeral was one of the largest ever held in St. Louis.

Moved by the public sympathy and respect, Edmund's brother Jacob L. Babler began searching for a way to preserve his brother's memory. Being a successful business graduate from St. Louis Law School, known today as Washington University in St. Louis, he had extensive investments in farm land and real estate. On August 20, 1930, Jacob Babler and his younger brother Henry Babler gave 868 acres of land to the State of Missouri, to be named the Dr. Edmund A. Babler Memorial State park. These were difficult and trying times in the world, and although they continued to give more land to the state between 1934 and 1936, Jacob had to seek the help of friend John J. Cochran, Congressman, in order to obtain federal aid for the state in order to develop the park. This aid came in the form of designating two Civilian Conservation Corps (CCC) camps to be stationed within the park to develop the property. With the help of Conrad Wirth, Director of the National Park System, plans were developed to establish a trust fund that would support construction, maintenance, and operations at the park. A state bill was passed to formally accept the land and was signed by Governor Lloyd Stark on June 23, 1937. The park was formally dedicated on October 1, 1938, at a ceremony in which Harold Ickes, Secretary of the Interior, spoke before an assembly of 3,500 guests. This was when the statue of Dr. Babler was unveiled in its current location.

Jacob Babler continued throughout the rest of his life to support the park dedicated to his brother, and the Missouri State Park System as a whole. He sponsored a proposal before the Constitution Convention of 1944, resulting in a fund developed to earmark $400,000 a year for 15 years to be used to acquire and develop additional land in the Missouri State Park System. Overcoming the lull of park development during the Great Depression and World War II, some of the most popular Missouri State Parks were acquired and developed between 1946 and 1960. Jacob L. Babler's support of the park system earned him the title of "Father of Missouri's State Parks".

== Activities and amenities ==
The park includes hiking trails of varying lengths and difficulty, as well as a campground with 75 sites, 35 of which have been newly renovated with full hookups, and picnic areas. A visitor center houses an exhibit hall presenting local natural and cultural history. Seasonal programs conducted by a park naturalist provide educational opportunities, including guided hikes, wildlife demonstrations, and interpretive talks. The park also supports wildlife observation, photography, and study of its geological and forest habitats.

The Babler Outdoor Education Center, a 300-acre facility located within the park, is operated by the Parkway-Rockwood Community Education through a partnership with Missouri State Parks. It offers outdoor and environmental education programs for youth, families, and adults, including nature-based classes, guided activities, and group learning experiences. The center includes cabins, meeting and recreation spaces, and outdoor facilities designed to support educational programming year-round, with accessibility features and priority given to groups with disabilities.

The park includes three open picnic shelters, one enclosed shelter, and two meeting or event spaces within the visitor center, all of which are reservable for group gatherings, educational programs, or private events.

Trail Information
Trail Name	Length in miles	Difficulty	Description
Dogwood Trail	2.1	Rugged	Dogwood Trail, located in the central portion of the park, is a loop trail with several spurs and a shared trailhead with Woodbine Trail. The trail travels north from the trailhead and features multiple steep inclines, with an elevation change of approximately 300 feet, the greatest in the park. It passes through a variety of habitats, including dry ridges with exposed chert and moist, forested valleys. The trail intersects Equestrian Trail multiple times and includes spur connections to Bates Picnic Area, the historic stables, and Babler Spring and a small cave. Dogwood and Woodbine trails can be combined for a longer hike.
Equestrian Trail	6.2	Rugged	Equestrian Trail forms a loop through a variety of forest habitats, including dry mesic oak-hickory ridges and lower, more mesic valleys. The trail crosses multiple park roads, passes picnic areas, and intersects with several hiking-only trails, including Hawthorne and Dogwood, as well as connector routes and the Paved Path. It includes notable features such as views of Wildhorse Creek, a very large sycamore tree, wet-weather creek crossings, and structures built by the Civilian Conservation Corps, including stone tunnels, a bridge, and historic stables. Vegetation along the trail ranges from cedar and sumac patches to pawpaw, spicebush, and seasonal wildflowers, with areas of notable fall color and limestone outcroppings .
Hawthorn Trail	1.2	Moderate	Hawthorn Trail is a short loop, one of the easiest trails in the park outside of the Paved Trail, highlights notable geological and ecological diversity. It follows a narrow ridge, traveling along the northeast side before returning along the southwest side. The contrasting aspects of the ridge support distinctly different habitats, with drier, rockier, glade-like conditions on the southwest slope and denser, more mesic vegetation, including pawpaw groves, on the northeast side. The area is actively managed with prescribed fire to help maintain its biological diversity.
Paved Trail	3.4	Easy	Paved Trail runs from the campground to the central portion of the park. From the campground, it travels northwest, passing a small cemetery and descending through a tunnel constructed by the Civilian Conservation Corps in the 1930s. The trail continues downhill past Crystal Spring, where moist conditions support vegetation such as pawpaw, spicebush, jack-in-the-pulpit, and trillium. It passes a trailhead and parking area, then continues north to intersect with Woodbine Trail, which it briefly follows before ending near another trailhead parking lot. Campground access is available near site #11, though no formal trailhead is located there.
Virginia Day Memorial Nature Trail	1.5	Moderate	Virginia Day Memorial Trail, located across from the visitor center, is named for Virginia Day, a volunteer naturalist who encouraged appreciation and study of the natural environment. The trail features both a short loop and a longer loop through predominantly oak-hickory forest. It descends into a valley, passing a pawpaw patch and a cedar stand, with the short loop remaining in the valley and returning to the trailhead. The longer loop continues farther south and west, climbs to a ridge, and includes a spur and connector to the Paved Path and Woodbine Trail before descending along a creek bed back toward the trailhead. The trail showcases variations in forest composition and moisture conditions from ridge to valley.
Woodbine Trail	1.8	Moderate	Woodbine Trail is located in the central portion of the park and briefly shares segments with both the Paved Bicycle Path and Equestrian Trail. Beginning at a shared trailhead with Dogwood Trail (which travels north), Woodbine Trail heads south through a valley, crossing a small footbridge and passing a stand of sweet gum trees. The trail follows the Paved Path near Crystal Spring, where moist conditions support vegetation such as pawpaw, spicebush, jack-in-the-pulpit, and trillium. It then joins the Equestrian Trail briefly before turning onto a sunnier ridge known for early fall color. Woodbine and Dogwood trails can be combined for a longer hike.
