= Jay Nixon State Park =

State park in Missouri, United States

Jay Nixon Backcountry
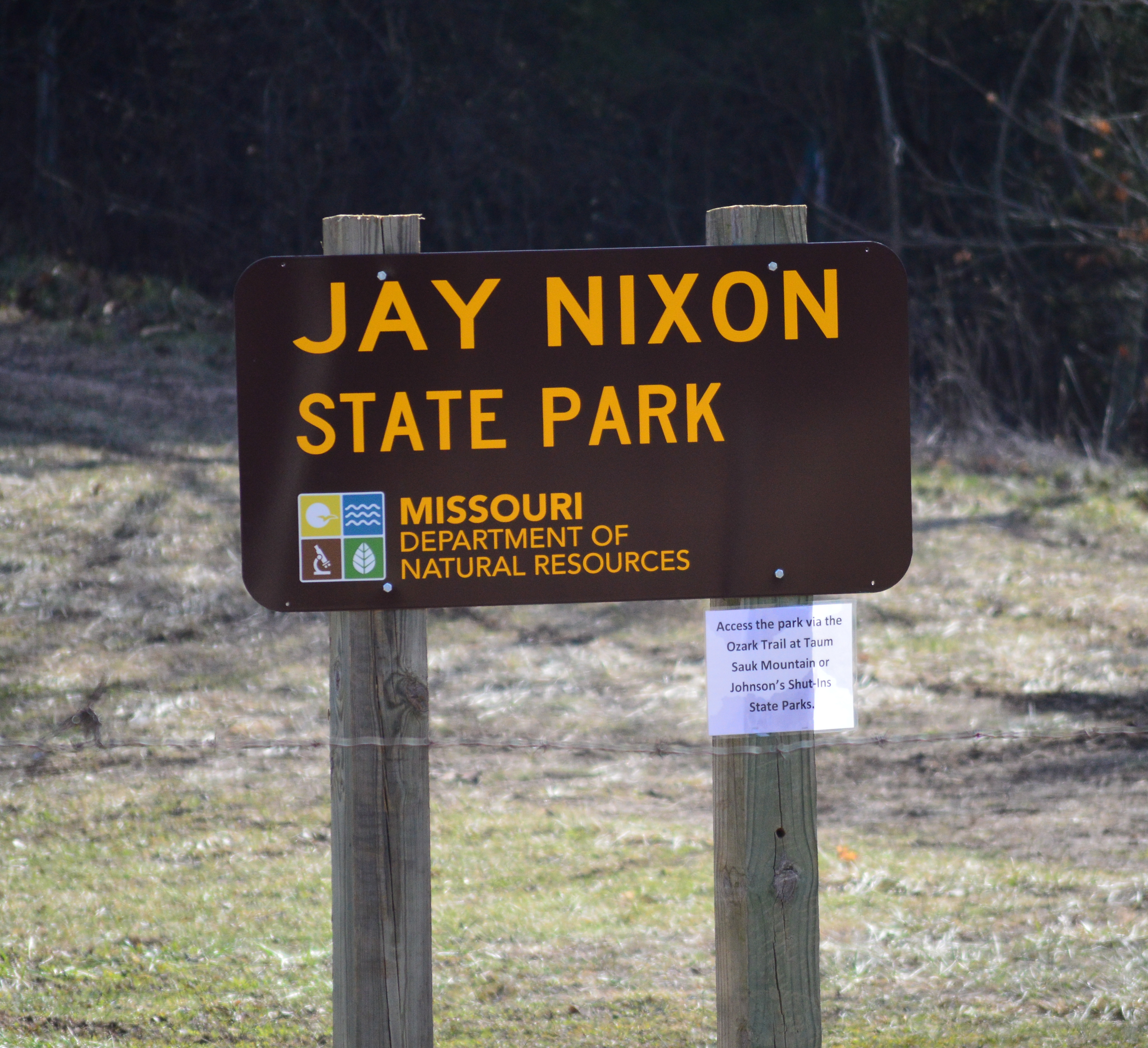
- Park sign on Missouri Route N

- Location within Missouri Location within the United States
- Location: Reynolds County, Missouri, United States
- Coordinates: 37°35′28″N 90°46′39″W
- Area: 1,231 acres (498 ha)
- Established: 2017
- Administrator: Missouri Department of Natural Resources
- Named for: Governor Jay Nixon
- Website: Official website

Jay Nixon Backcountry is an undeveloped state park primarily located in Reynolds County, Missouri, with a 100-acre segment in Iron County. The property lies adjacent to Taum Sauk Mountain State Park and borders Ketcherside Conservation Area. The property is not open to the public. The park is named for governor Jay Nixon under whom several new Missouri state parks were added.

== History ==
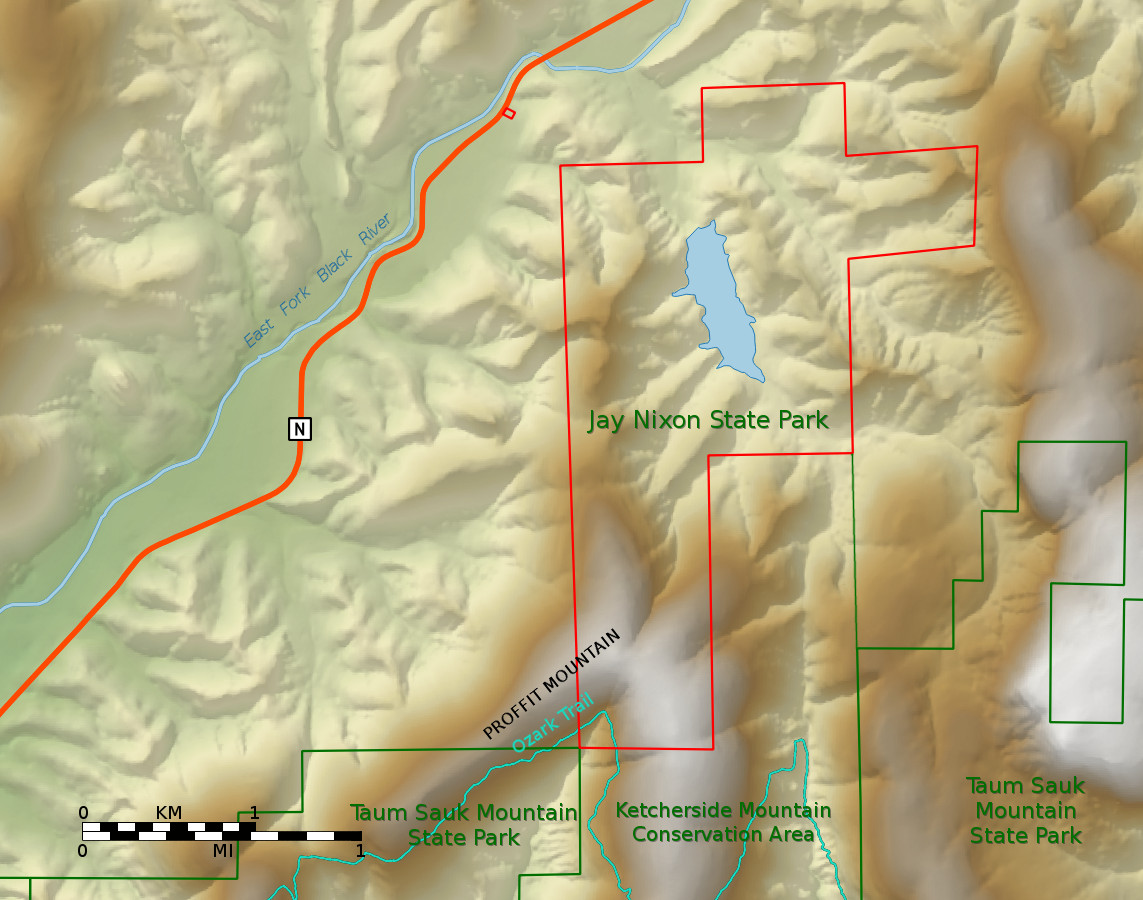
Relief map of the park and the immediate area

Creation of the park was announced by the Missouri Department of Natural Resources in January 2017. At the time of the park's announcement there were no facilities in the park, and it could only be accessed via the Ozark Trail. After initially announcing the park open, though largely inaccessible, the park's website was updated to say that as of February 2017, it is closed with no access.

The name of the new park has been controversial, and on January 12, 2017, Missouri state senator Gary Romine and state representative Paul Fitzwater filed bills in their respective chambers to rename the park Proffitt Mountain State Park.
