= Morris Park =

Morris Park may refer to:

- Morris Park, Bronx, a neighborhood in the Bronx borough of New York City
- Morris Park Racecourse, an American thoroughbred horse racing facility from 1889 until 1904 that was once home to the Belmont Stakes
- Morris Park Aerodrome, located from 1908 to 1909 at the site of the racecourse.
- Morris Park Facility, a maintenance facility of the Long Island Rail Road in Queens, New York
- Morris Park, Minneapolis, a neighborhood in the Nokomis community in Minneapolis, Minnesota
- Morris Park, Philadelphia, a city park in Overbrook, Philadelphia
- Morris State Park, a state park in the US state of Missouri
- Mount Morris Park Historic District, a historic district in New York City around Marcus Garvey Park
- Panther Park, a ballpark in Fort Worth, Texas, originally called Morris Park, home of the Fort Worth Panthers

== See also ==
- Marcus Garvey Park, formerly Mount Morris Park, a park in Harlem in the New York City borough of Manhattan
