= Bothwell Lodge State Historic Site =

Historic house in Sedalia, Missouri

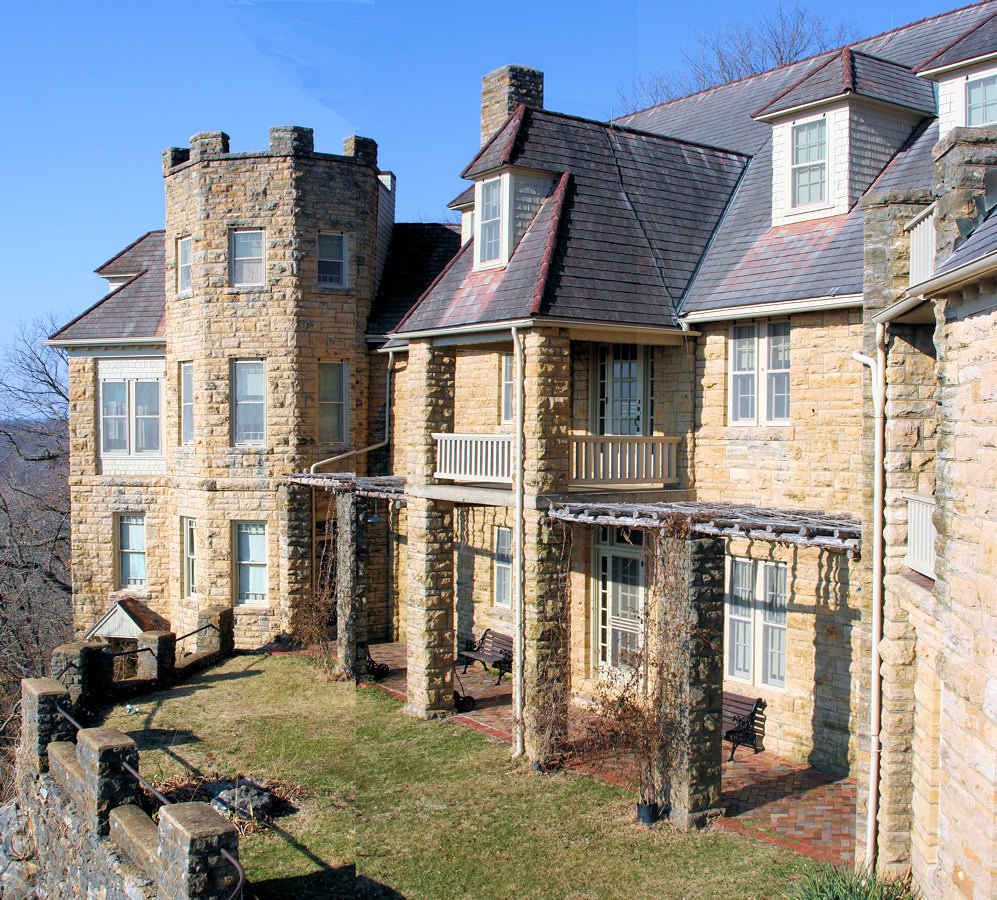
- West front of Bothwell Lodge

- Location within Missouri Location within the United States
- Location: Cedar Township, Pettis County, Missouri, United States
- Coordinates: 38°47′29″N 93°12′58″W
- Area: 246.91 acres (99.92 ha)
- Established: 1974
- Visitors: 41,259 (in 2022)
- Governing body: Missouri Department of Natural Resources
- Website: Bothwell Lodge State Historic Site

Bothwell Lodge State Historic Site is a state-owned property located north of Sedalia, Missouri, United States, preserving the 31-room, 12,000-square-foot summer home, Bothwell Lodge, built for Sedalia attorney John Homer Bothwell. The site offers tours and trails for hiking and mountain biking. It is administered by the Missouri Department of Natural Resources.

== History ==
John Bothwell purchased the property in 1896, naming it Stonyridge Farm. From 1897 to 1928, Bothwell built the lodge in four phases on top of a rock bluff overlooking a valley. The lodge was intended to be a summer home and is an eclectic combination of various styles with Craftsman influences. One of the eccentricities of the home was an attempt to use a natural cave discovered during construction as a source of natural air conditioning. The limestone used in the home's construction was quarried on site.

A widower for most of his life, Bothwell often invited family and friends to stay at the lodge. It was to this group of individuals that he left the lodge upon his death. The group was named the Bothwell Lodge Club, and the lodge was placed under its control so long as more than five members remained alive. Upon the death of the sixth member (reducing the membership to five), the lodge would be offered to the state. In 1969, the property was officially offered to the state, which accepted the home five years later.

== Activities and amenities ==
In addition to the lodge, the grounds include a garage/home, another separate home, hiking trails, picnicking facilities, and a playground.
