= Hunter-Dawson State Historic Site =

Historic house in New Madrid, Missouri

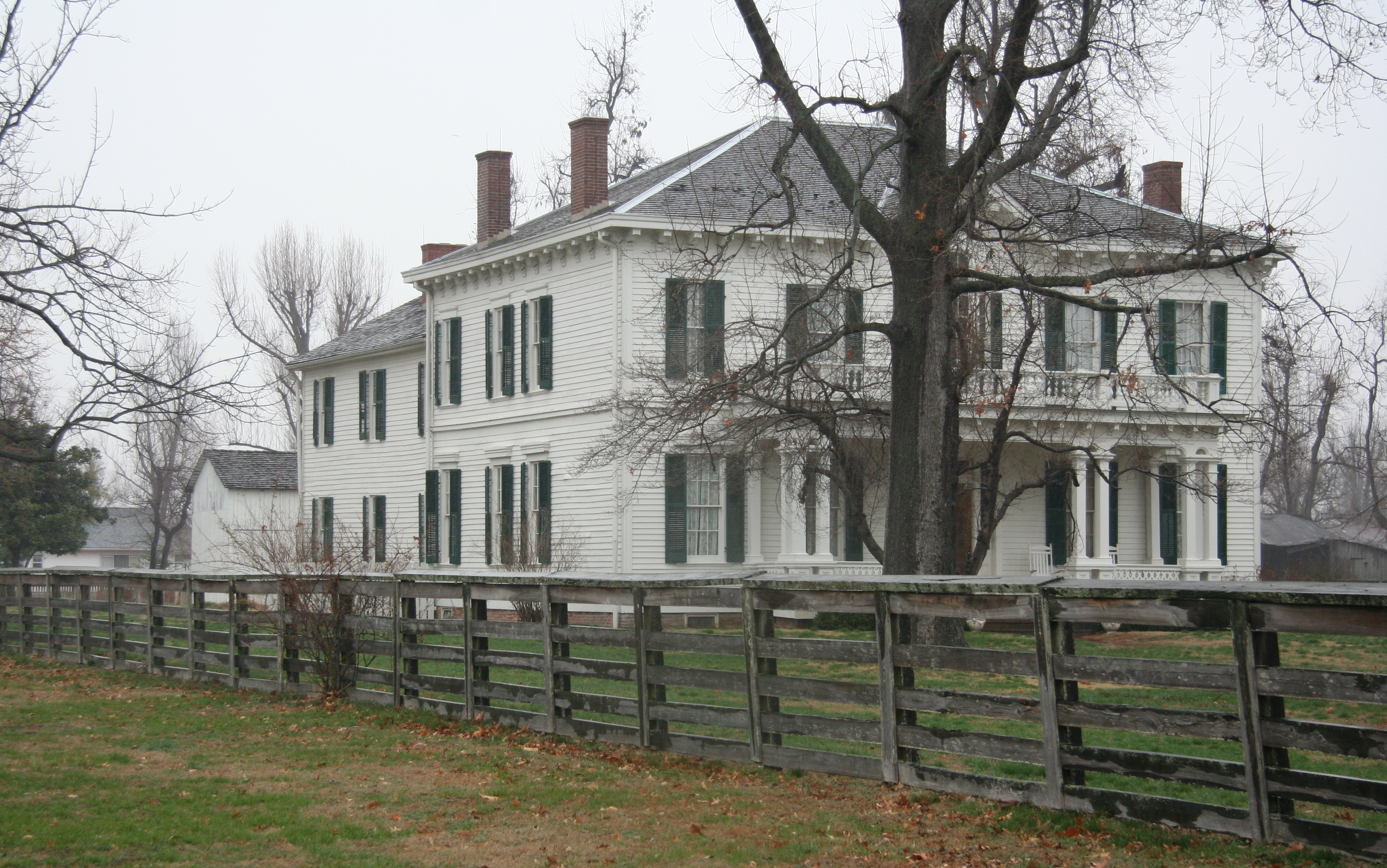

- Location within Missouri Location within the United States
- Location: New Madrid, New Madrid County, Missouri, United States
- Coordinates: 36°35′45″N 89°31′26″W
- Area: 19.8 acres (8.0 ha)
- Established: 1967
- Visitors: 3,304 (in 2022)
- Governing body: Missouri Department of Natural Resources
- Website: Hunter-Dawson State Historic Site
- Hunter-Dawson House
- U.S. National Register of Historic Places
- Nearest city: New Madrid, Missouri
- Area: 19 acres (7.7 ha)
- Built: 1859
- Built by: Newhouse, William (carpenter)
- Architectural style: Greek Revival, Italianate
- NRHP reference No.: 12000563
- Added to NRHP: August 28, 2012

The Hunter-Dawson State Historic Site is a state-owned property in New Madrid, Missouri, maintained by the Missouri Department of Natural Resources as a historic house museum and state historic site. The Hunter-Dawson House was added to the National Register of Historic Places in 2012.

== History ==
The 15-room Hunter-Dawson House was constructed between 1859 and 1860 for the wealthy and influential family of William Washington Hunter and his wife Amanda. William Hunter was a Virginian by way of Potosi, Missouri. Mr. Hunter was a merchant, farmer, and real estate investor. He died from yellow fever shortly before construction started, and his wife Amanda completed the project. Local craftsmen and at least some of the Hunter family's slaves constructed the house. Amanda's daughter Ella and her husband William Dawson inherited the house in 1876. The house remained in the family until 1958, and was purchased by the city in 1966 before being donated to the state of Missouri. The museum retains an estimated 80% of Amanda Dawson's original furniture.
