= Ozark Trail (hiking trail) =

Multi-use trail in Missouri and Arkansas, United States

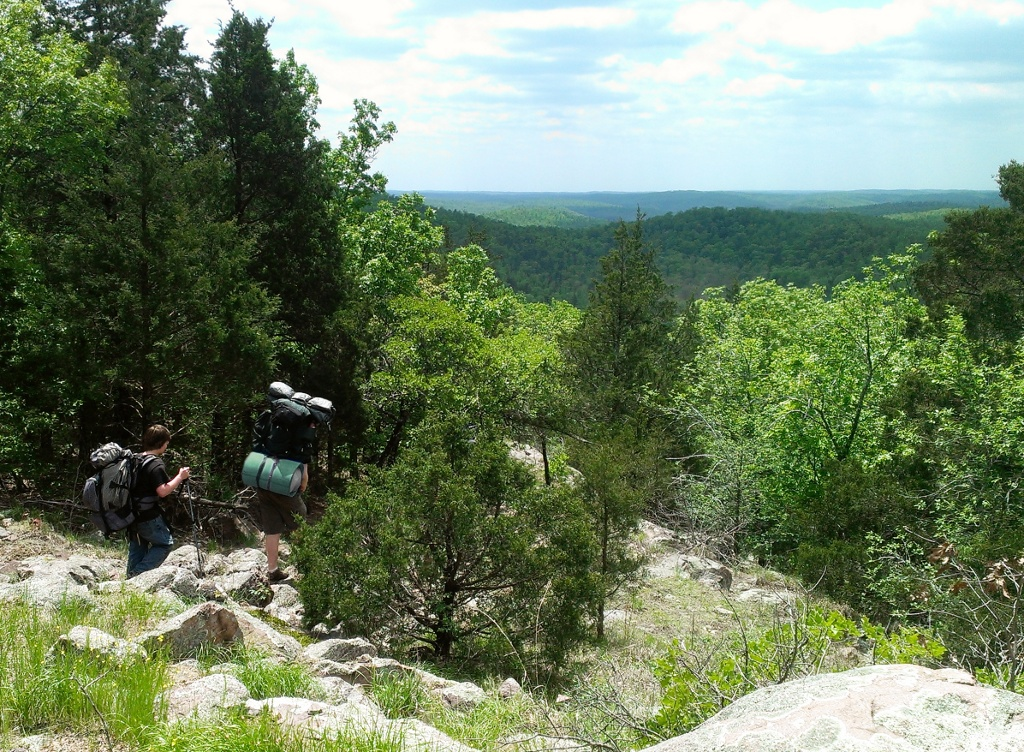
- View of the Taum Sauk section of the trail on Goggins Mountain
- Website: Ozark Trail Association

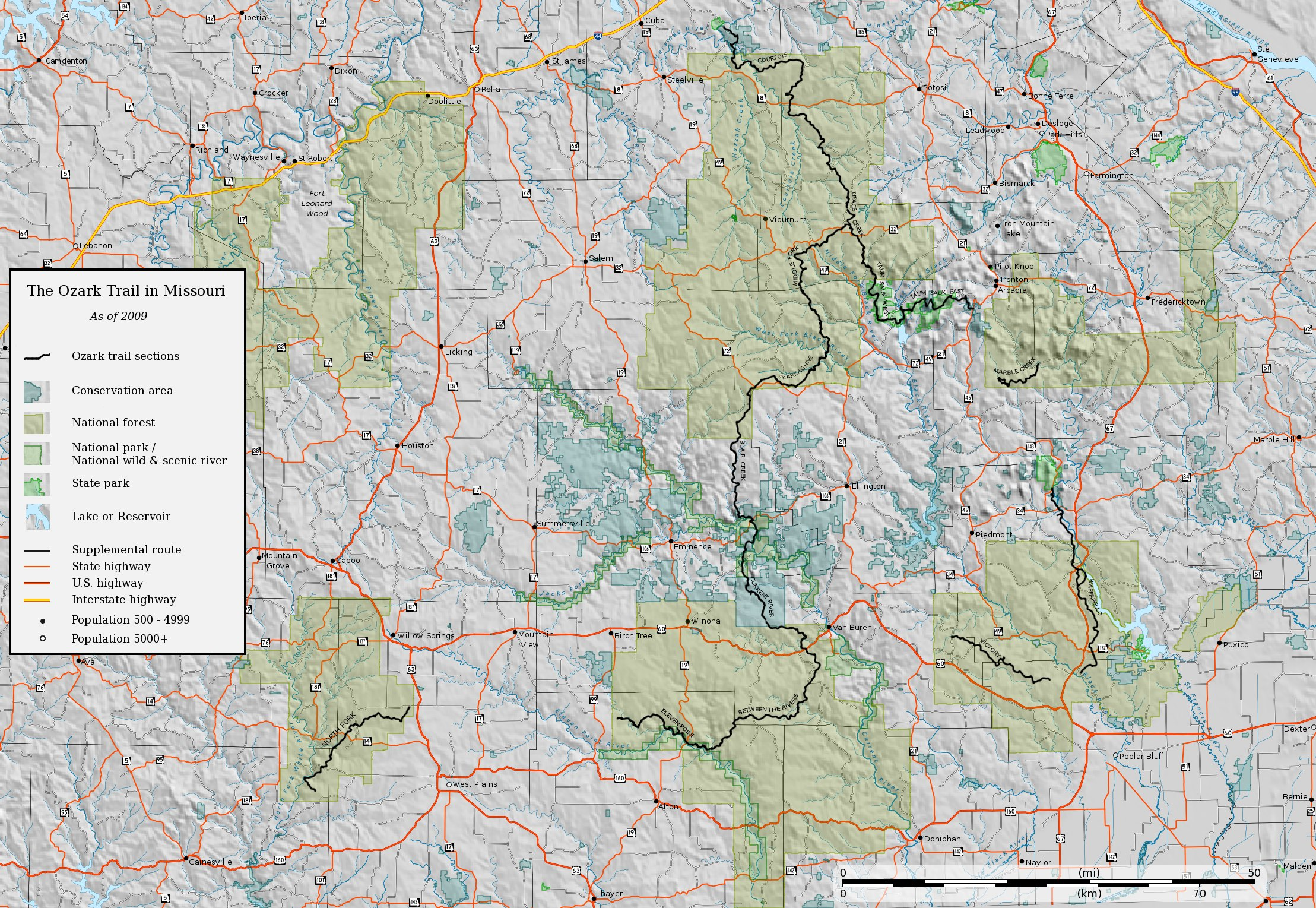
Completed sections of the Ozark Trail

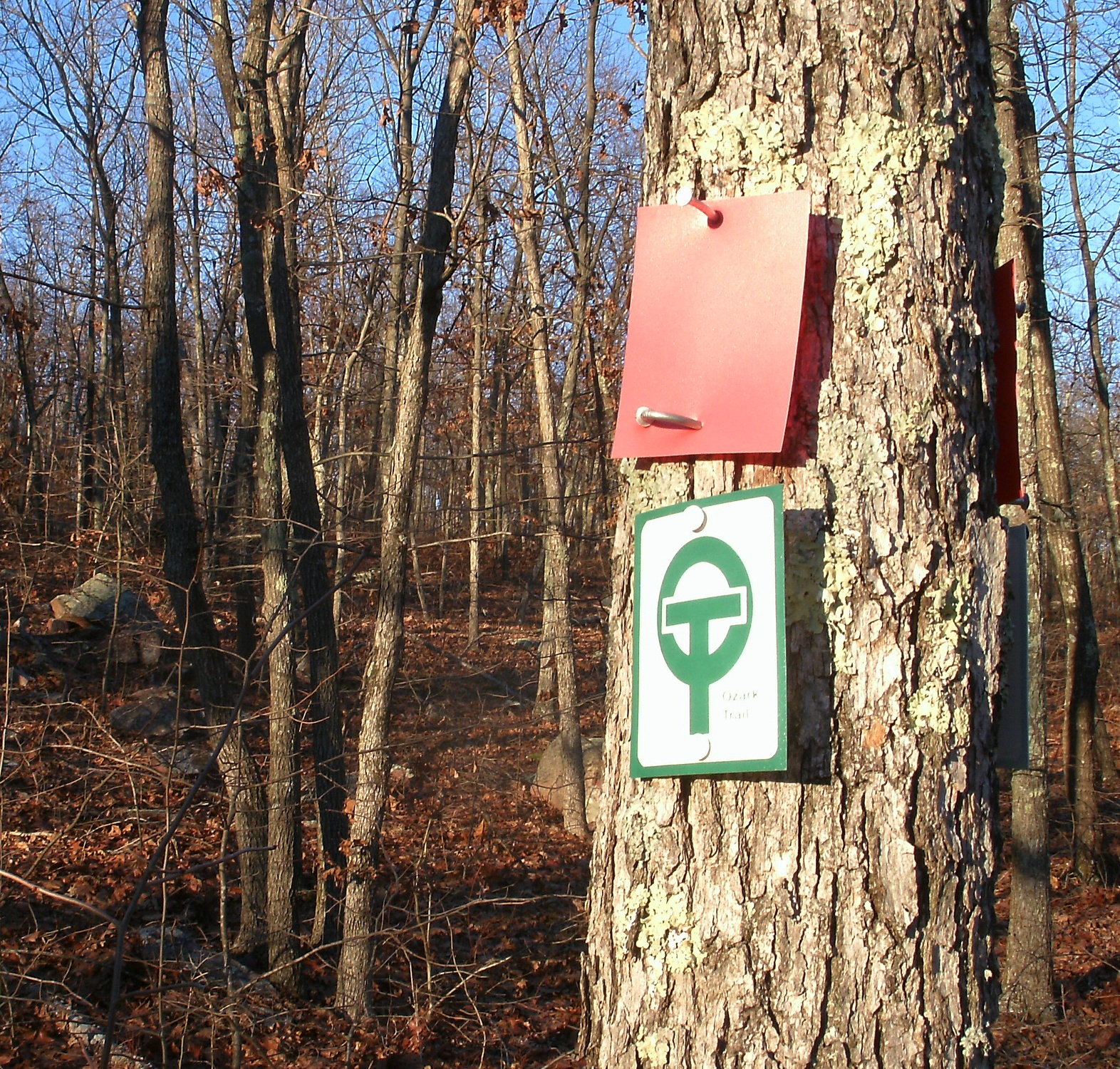
The green and white blaze for the Ozark Trail

The Ozark Trail is a hiking, backpacking, and, in many places, biking and equestrian trail under construction in the Missouri Ozarks in the United States. It is intended to reach from St. Louis to Arkansas. Over 350 miles (563 km) of the trail have been completed as of 2008, and the estimated length when finished will be at least 500 miles (805 km). When joined to the Ozark Highlands Trail in Arkansas, the full hiking distance from end to end will be at least 700 miles (1,127 km), not including a large loop through the St. Francois Mountains in Missouri.

== Description ==
The trail is currently composed of thirteen sections, most of which are joined to other sections, though some gaps exist. The sections vary in length from 8 to 40 miles (13 to 64 km). The longest continuous stretch available for hiking in as of 2008 is 225 miles (362 km), from Onondaga Cave State Park to the Eleven Point River. The exact routes for incomplete sections have not been established, so the total length of the trail when completed remains undetermined.

Some sections have restrictions on their use in order to be compatible with the goals and purposes of the various public and private landholders whose property the trail crosses. Horseback riding, mountain biking, or trail side camping may be restricted in certain environmentally sensitive areas.

== Development ==
The Ozark Trail had its beginnings in the 1970s when a group of public land managers, land owners, and trail users met to discuss the concept of a long-distance hiking trail. A comprehensive state outdoor recreation plan prepared by the state of Missouri in 1975 showed a need for an addition of 500 to 900 miles (805 to 1,448 km) of hiking trails. It was determined that a trail spanning the Ozarks from suburban St. Louis southwest to Arkansas could be routed over mostly existing public lands with a minimum amount of right-of-way needing to be obtained from private landowners. A first meeting in 1976 at Meramec State Park lead to the first draft of the trails proposal in February 1977 and in 1981 the first sections of the trail were under construction.

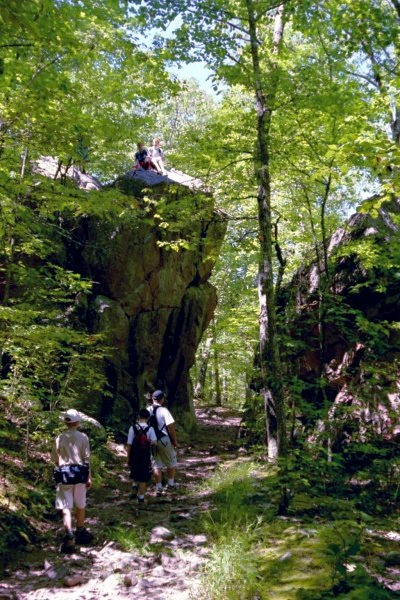
The trail passes through the Devil's Tollgate formation below Taum Sauk Mountain.

The general route of the Ozark Trail is determined by the Ozark Trail Council, which was formed by seven governmental agencies including the United States Forest Service, the Missouri State Parks Department, the Missouri Conservation Commission, et al., plus several environmental groups and a private landowner with significant holdings. The land manager for each parcel held by these constituents is responsible for the trail within its holdings.

This unique decentralized arrangement is conducive to work progressing on many fronts at once and is partly responsible for the rapid initial progress in building the trail — 170 (275 km) miles within the first decade and over 200 miles (322 km) by 1991. In 2008, the mileage stands at over 350 miles (563 km). As the route over contiguous public lands is completed further progress will likely be slowed by the arduous process of acquiring private land and easements.

Volunteers formed the Ozark Trail Association in 2002 to work with the Ozark Trail Council to develop and maintain the Ozark Trail. The Ozark Trail was designated a National Recreation Trail in 2008

== Damage ==
=== Taum Sauk reservoir failure ===
The upper reservoir of the Taum Sauk pumped storage plant failed in December 2005, causing a flood that devastated Johnson's Shut-ins State Park and destroyed a part of the Taum Sauk section of the Ozark Trail at the shut-ins. The Ozark Trail Association and the Missouri Department of Natural Resources mapped out a new route to replace the damaged section, which was completed in mid-2009.

=== May 2009 storms ===
An unusually strong May 2009 windstorm devastated 44 miles of the trail within the Mark Twain National Forest, and all or parts of several sections of the Ozark Trail were closed because of downed trees. Within months several sections were repaired and reopened through the work of both volunteer and paid forest service crews. All access was eventually restored, though as of May, 2013, conditions on some sections of trail may be of concern to bikers or to those on horseback.

== See also ==
The trail crosses parts of these public lands:

- Eleven Point National Wild and Scenic River
- Johnson's Shut-ins State Park
- Mark Twain National Forest
- Onondaga Cave State Park
- Ozark National Scenic Riverways
- Roger Pryor Pioneer Backcountry
- Sam A. Baker State Park
- Taum Sauk Mountain State Park
- Bell Mountain Wilderness Area
- Devils Backbone Wilderness Area
- Numerous holdings of the Missouri Department of Conservation
