= Wakonda State Park =

State park in Missouri, United States

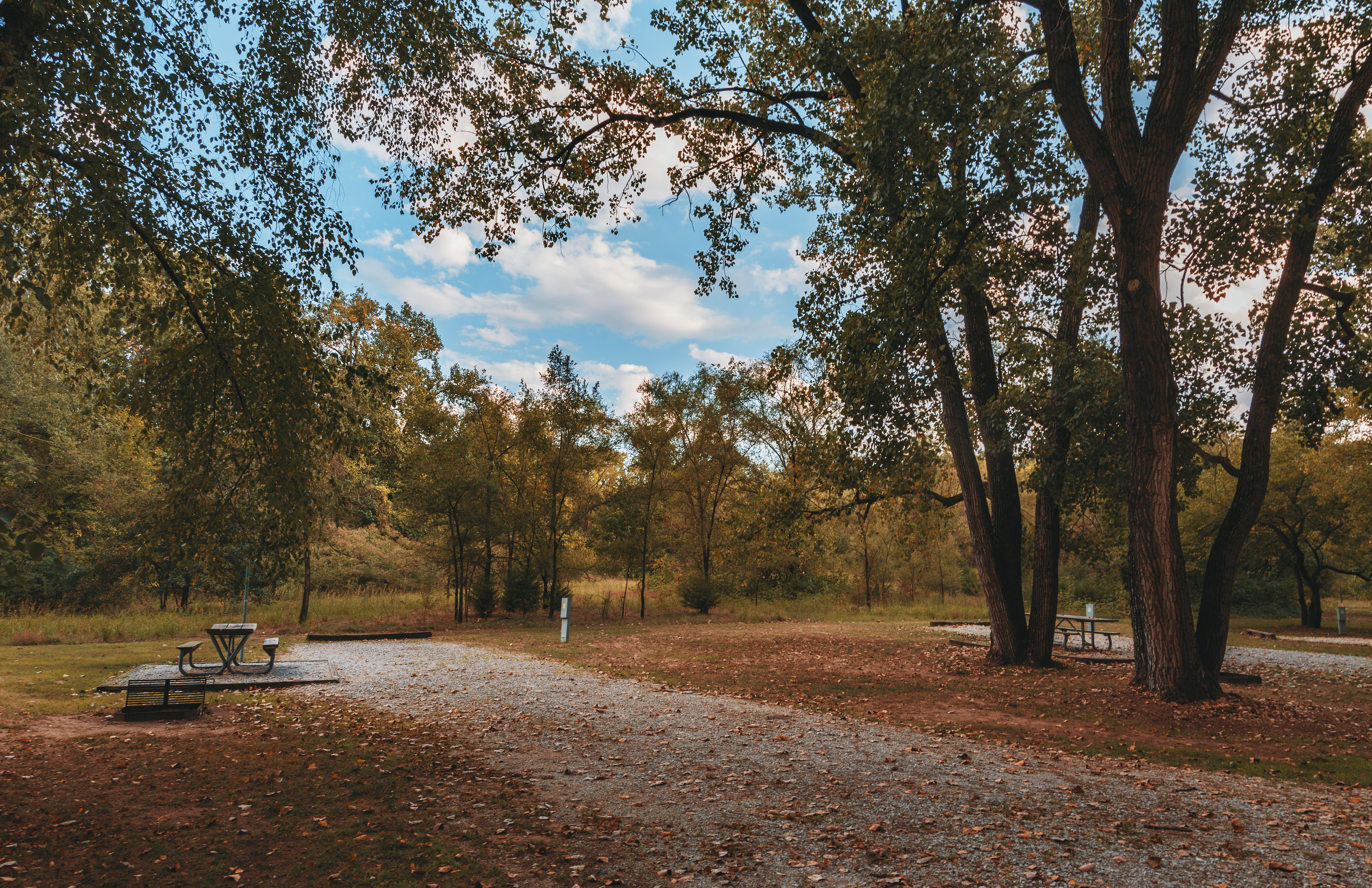
- A campsite at Wakonda State Park

- Location within Missouri Location within the United States
- Location: Lewis County, Missouri, United States
- Coordinates: 40°00′23″N 91°31′26″W
- Area: 1,053.87 acres (426.49 ha)
- Elevation: 814 ft (248 m)
- Established: 1960
- Administrator: Missouri Department of Natural Resources
- Visitors: 225,683 (in 2023)
- Website: Official website

Wakonda State Park is a public recreation area covering 1,054 acres (427 ha) near La Grange in Lewis County, Missouri. The state park features water recreation on six small lakes.

== History ==
The park occupies one of the few remaining sand prairie areas found along the central and northern Mississippi River. During the last Ice Age, the glacial movement left large deposits of high-quality gravel and sand. Beginning in 1924, the Missouri Highway Commission contracted with private companies to remove gravel deposits for use in road surfacing. The depth of the gravel required open-pit mining techniques which eventually led to the creation of the six lakes that dot the park's landscape. By the 1980s, some 26 million tons of sand and gravel had been removed from the area.

The park was established in 1960 on 273 acres (110 ha) transferred from the Missouri Highway Commission. Its name "Wakonda" was taken from an Osage Indian word meaning something consecrated or spiritual. Further land purchases by the state included a 777-acre (314 ha) tract added to the park in 1992.

== Activities and amenities ==
The park's lakes are used for fishing, swimming, and small-motor and non-motorized boating. There are two campgrounds with a total of more than 100 campsites and trails for hiking and bicycling.
