= Battle of Carthage State Historic Site =

Historic battlefield in Missouri, United States

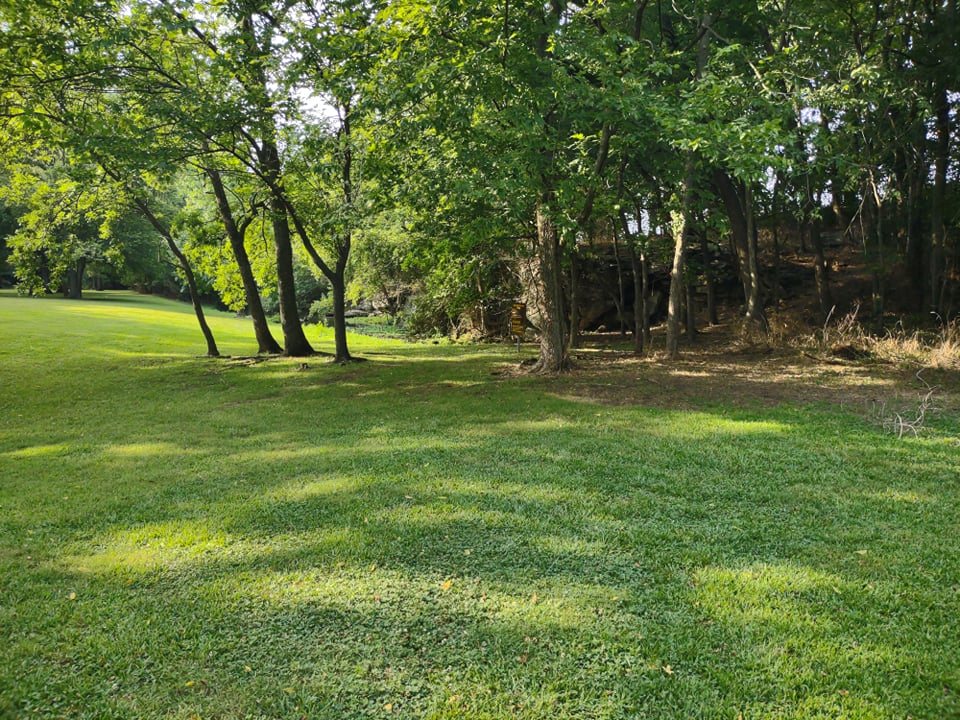
- Photo of the site

- Location within Missouri Location within the United States
- Location: Carthage, Missouri, United States
- Coordinates: 37°10′24″N 94°17′50″W
- Area: 7.4 acres (3.0 ha)
- Established: 1990
- Visitors: 22,175 (in 2023)
- Administrator: Missouri Department of Natural Resources
- Website: Official website

The Battle of Carthage State Historic Site is a state-owned property located in the city of Carthage, Missouri. The 7.4-acre (3.0 ha) site preserves one of the skirmish sites of the Battle of Carthage which took place in 1861 as one of the first battles of the American Civil War. The site was acquired by the state in 1990 and is managed by the Missouri Department of Natural Resources.
