= Sam A. Baker State Park =

State park in Missouri, United States

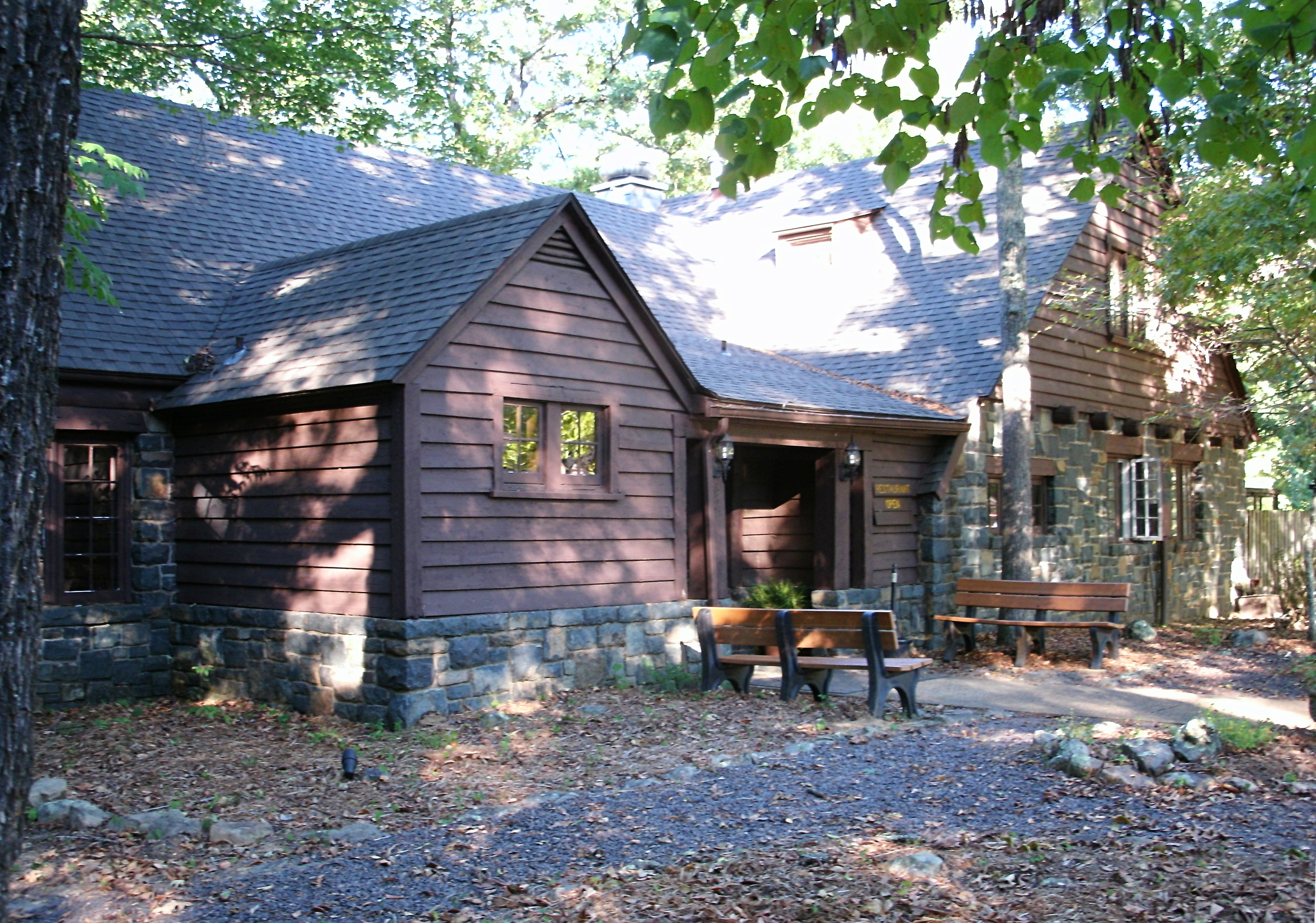
- Dining lodge made of native stone and wood

- Location within Missouri Location within the United States
- Location: Wayne County, Missouri, United States
- Coordinates: 37°15′12″N 90°31′34″W
- Area: 5,323 acres (2,154 ha)
- Elevation: 922 ft (281 m)
- Established: 1926
- Administrator: Missouri Department of Natural Resources
- Visitors: 1,200,116 (in 2023)
- Website: Official website
- Sam A. Baker State Park Historic District
- U.S. National Register of Historic Places
- U.S. Historic district
- Nearest city: Patterson, Missouri
- Area: 4,860 acres (1,970 ha)
- Built: 1933
- Built by: Civilian Conservation Corps; Works Progress Administration
- Architectural style: Rustic
- MPS: ECW Architecture in Missouri State Parks 1933-1942 TR
- NRHP reference No.: 85000540
- Added to NRHP: February 27, 1985

Sam A. Baker State Park is a public recreation area encompassing 5,323 acres (2,154 ha) in the Saint Francois Mountains region of the Missouri Ozarks. The state park offers fishing, canoeing, swimming, camping, and trails for hiking and horseback riding. The visitor and nature center is housed in a historic building that was originally constructed as a stable in 1934. Twenty-five buildings and five structures comprise the Sam A. Baker State Park Historic District, a national historic district listed on the National Register of Historic Places in 1985.

== History ==
The state park was acquired in 1926 and is named for Missouri governor Sam Aaron Baker who encouraged the development of the park in his home county. In the 1930s, the Civilian Conservation Corps added many structures to the park including the park office and visitors center, which was originally used as a stable, the stone dining lodge, most of the park's cabins, and the backpacking shelters on the Mudlick Trail.

== Activities and amenities ==
- The park offers access to the St. Francis River and Big Creek for fishing, canoeing, and swimming.
- Camping: The park has 187 campsites, half of them electric and 18 rustic, plus air-conditioned cabins. A separate campground with 21 sites is available for use by equestrians.
- Trails: The 14-mile (23 km) Mudlick Trail is available for hiking, backpacking, and horseback riding. The Mudlick has three stone shelters available for backpackers, and views of the 4,420-acre (1,790 ha) Mudlick Mountain Wild Area and the 1,370-acre (550 ha) Mudlick Natural Area. There is also the 1.5-mile (2.4 km) Shut-Ins Trail, the Hollow Pass Trail, and the nearby Wappapello Section of the Ozark Trail. The park also has a 2-mile (3.2 km) paved bicycle trail open to cyclists, hikers, skateboarders, and roller skaters.

== Access ==
Missouri Route 143 passes through the park. From the west access is via Route 143 from DesArc in southern Iron County. Access from the east and US Route 67 is via Missouri Route 34 north of Silva to the Route 143 junction east of Patterson.
