= Eleven Point State Park =

State park in Missouri, United States

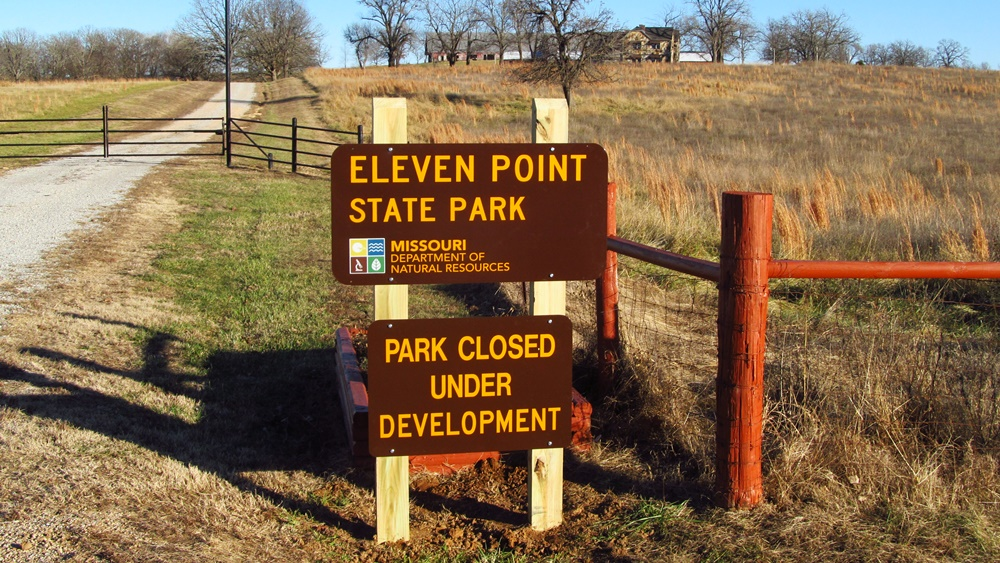
- Sign at park entrance

- Location within Missouri Location within the United States
- Location: Oregon County, Missouri, United States
- Coordinates: 36°37′01″N 91°10′27″W
- Area: 4,167 acres (1,686 ha)
- Established: 2016
- Administrator: Missouri Department of Natural Resources
- Website: Official website

Eleven Point State Park is a public recreation area comprising 4,167 acres (1,686 ha) located mostly on lands of the historic Pigman Ranch near Riverton in Oregon County on Eleven Point River in the Ozarks of southern Missouri. The park is closed awaiting development. Development plans call for facilities for hiking and walking, camping, fishing, picnicking, birdwatching, and nature study. It was one of three new Missouri state parks announced in 2016. The Missouri Department of Natural Resources conducted a one-day open house and guided hike of the unopened park in May 2023.
