= Iliniwek Village State Historic Site =

Historic site in Missouri, United States

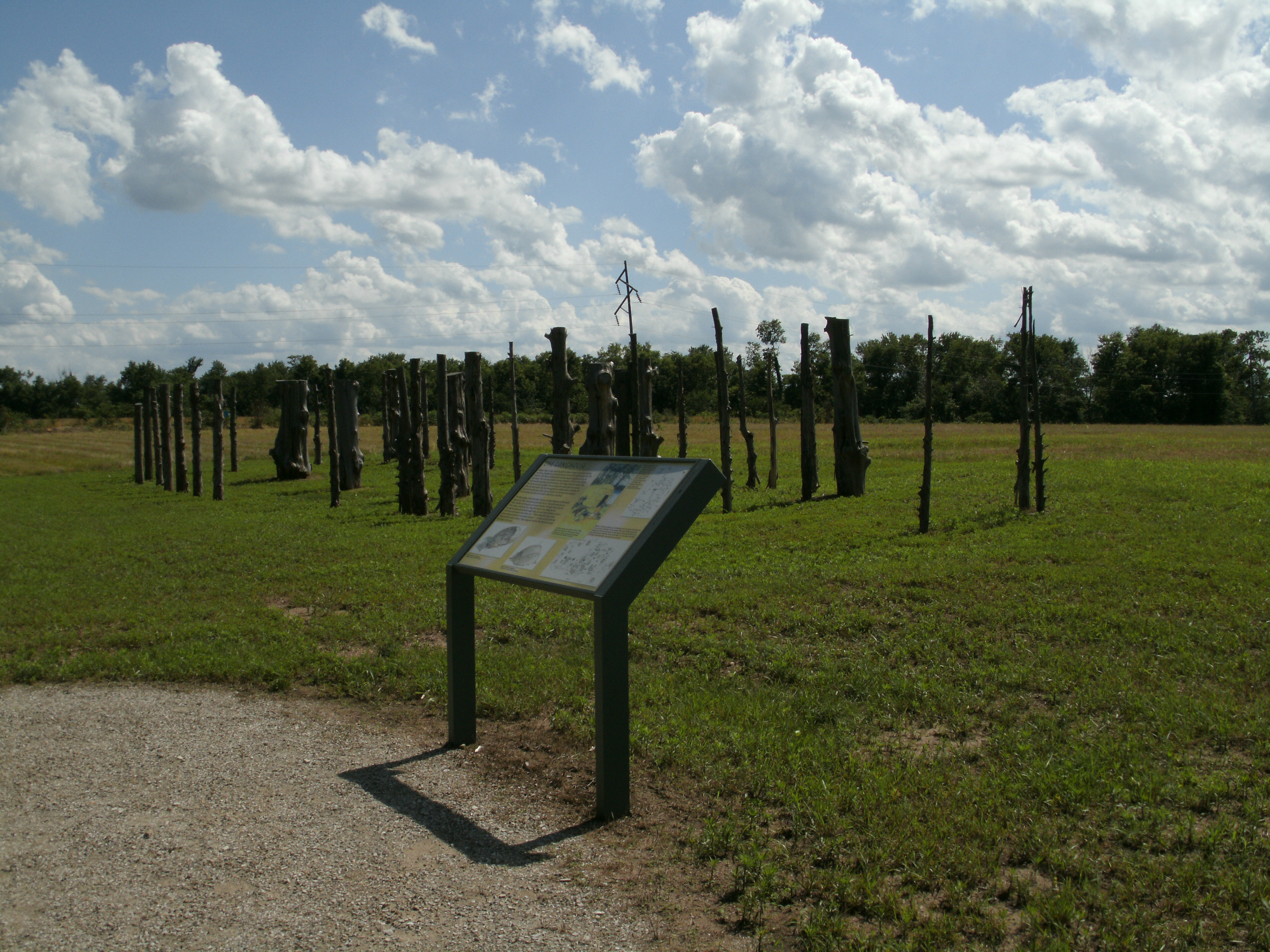

- Location within Missouri Location within the United States
- Location: Clark Country, Missouri, United States
- Coordinates: 40°25′51″N 91°33′17″W
- Area: 127.49 acres (51.59 ha)
- Established: 1992
- Visitors: 11,454 (in 2022)
- Governing body: Missouri Department of Natural Resources
- Website: Iliniwek Village State Historic Site

The Iliniwek Village State Historic Site is a state-owned property in Clark County, Missouri, maintained by the Missouri Department of Natural Resources, preserving the only known Illinois Indian village discovered in Missouri.

== History ==
Acquired by the state of Missouri in 1992, the 127-acre historic site has proved to be an important archaeological discovery due to its size and quality of preservation. It is considered the largest and best preserved of any Illinois Indian village. The village was occupied from approximately 1640 to 1683. During that time the village contained at least three hundred (300) lodges with an estimated population in excess of eight thousand (8,000) tribe members. Archaeological digs in the 1990s discovered numerous house foundations, storage pits and evidence of a palisade fortification. The remains of at least one tribal member were also recovered at the site, in 1998. Among smaller items found was evidence of contact with early European explorers and traders, including glass beads, metal objects, and Jesuit trade rings. The Illinois Indian tribe were the first Native Americans encountered in present-day Missouri by Louis Joliet and Father Jacques Marquette, who visited the village in 1673.

== Site details ==
The site is located on a high sand terrace above the Des Moines River floodplain off Clark County Road 188 two miles south-southeast of St. Francisville, Missouri. A walking trail of one and a quarter miles has interpretive signage, the remains of a typical Illinois Tribe–style long house, an oxbow lake, and an example of an Illinois round house. Limited picknicking and restroom facilities are available. The site is open year-round from sunrise to sunset, with a gate blocking vehicle traffic from November through March.
