= Roger Pryor Pioneer Backcountry =

Recreation area in Missouri, United States

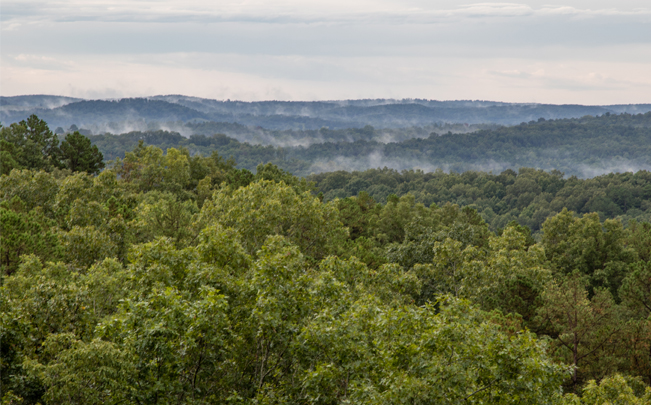

- Location within Missouri Location within the United States
- Location: Shannon County, Missouri, United States
- Coordinates: 37°20′37″N 91°25′20″W
- Area: 95 sq mi (250 km^{2})
- Established: 2001
- Administrator: Missouri Department of Natural Resources
- Website: Official website

The Roger Pryor Pioneer Backcountry is a 60,000-acre (243 km^{2}) area of private land that is managed by the Missouri Department of Natural Resources for hiking and backpacking by the public. The land is part of the largest private forest in the state, the Pioneer Forest, owned by the L-A-D Foundation, an endowment of the late Missouri timber magnate, conservationist, and philanthropist Leo Drey (1917–2015).

Two significant wilderness areas are included in the managed area: the Current River Natural Area which contains 400-year-old trees, and the Pioneer Natural Area adjacent to the Current River, which is home to old-growth cedar and hardwood trees.

The area is crossed by 27 miles (43 km) of trails: the 13-mile (21 km) Blair Creek Section of the Ozark Trail, the 12-mile (19 km) Brushy Creek Trail, and a 2-mile (3.2 km) Laxton Hollow Trail, which connects to the Ozark Trail. An additional trail under construction, the Current River Trail, will eventually connect Round Spring, a few miles west of the backcountry area, to the Brushy Creek Trail.

Map of Roger Pryor Pioneer Backcountry and neighboring protected areas
