= Stockton State Park =

State park in Missouri, United States

- Location within Missouri Location within the United States
- Location: Cedar County, Missouri, United States
- Coordinates: 37°36′21″N 93°44′45″W
- Area: 2,175.9 acres (880.6 ha)
- Elevation: 948 ft (289 m)
- Established: 1969
- Administrator: Missouri Department of Natural Resources
- Visitors: 245,754 (in 2023)
- Website: Official website

Stockton State Park is a public recreation area occupying 2,176 acres (881 ha) on the shore of Stockton Lake, nine miles (14 km) south of Stockton, Missouri. The state park occupies a northward jutting peninsula between the Big Sac and Little Sac arms of the 25,000-acre (10,000 ha) lake, which was created when the U.S. Army Corps of Engineers dammed the Sac River in 1969.

== Activities and amenities ==
The park provides recreation that includes fishing, swimming, skiing, scuba diving, and sailing. The park's marina has two boat ramps and more than 300 stalls, some assigned exclusively to sailboats. There are also picnicking areas, campgrounds, and camper cabins.
