= Clark's Hill/Norton State Historic Site =

Historic site in Missouri, United States

- Location within Missouri Location within the United States
- Location: Cole County, Missouri, United States
- Coordinates: 38°33′29″N 92°1′40″W
- Area: 13.4 acres (5.4 ha)
- Established: 2002
- Visitors: 7,334 (in 2022)
- Governing body: Missouri Department of Natural Resources
- Website: Clark's Hill/Norton State Historic Site

Clark's Hill/Norton State Historic Site is located on the eastern edge of Jefferson City Missouri, United States. The park preserves one of the campsites used by the Lewis and Clark Expedition as well as a lookout point from which William Clark viewed the confluence of the Osage and Missouri rivers. American Indian burial mounds may also be seen at the site. The site was donated to the state by Jefferson City residents William and Carol Norton in 2002 and opened to the public in 2004.
