= Cedar Township, Pettis County, Missouri =

Inactive township in the US state of Missouri

Coordinates: 38.7636°N 93.2244°W

Cedar Township is an inactive township in Pettis County, in the U.S. state of Missouri.

Cedar Township was so named on account of cedar bushes within its borders.
