= Watkins Woolen Mill State Park and State Historic Site =

State park in Missouri, U.S.

Watkins Mill State Park and Watkins Woolen Mill State Historic Site
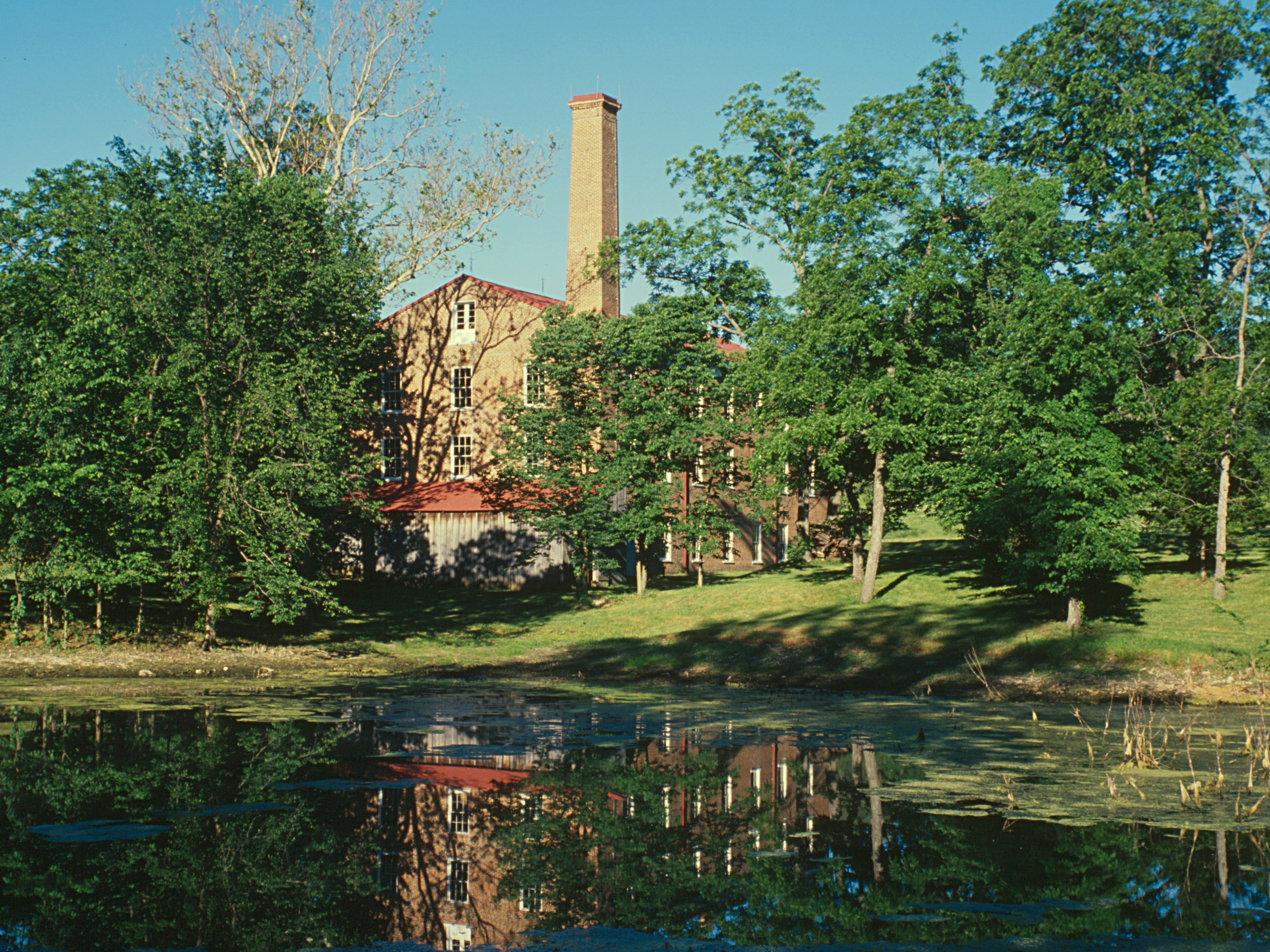
- Watkins Mill

- Location within Missouri Location within the United States
- Location: Clay County, Missouri, United States
- Coordinates: 39°23′52″N 94°15′38″W
- Area: 1,500.22 acres (607.12 ha)
- Elevation: 896 ft (273 m)
- Established: 1964
- Administrator: Missouri Department of Natural Resources
- Visitors: 307,136 (in 2023)
- Website: Official website
- Watkins Mill
- U.S. National Register of Historic Places
- U.S. National Historic Landmark
- U.S. National Historic Landmark District
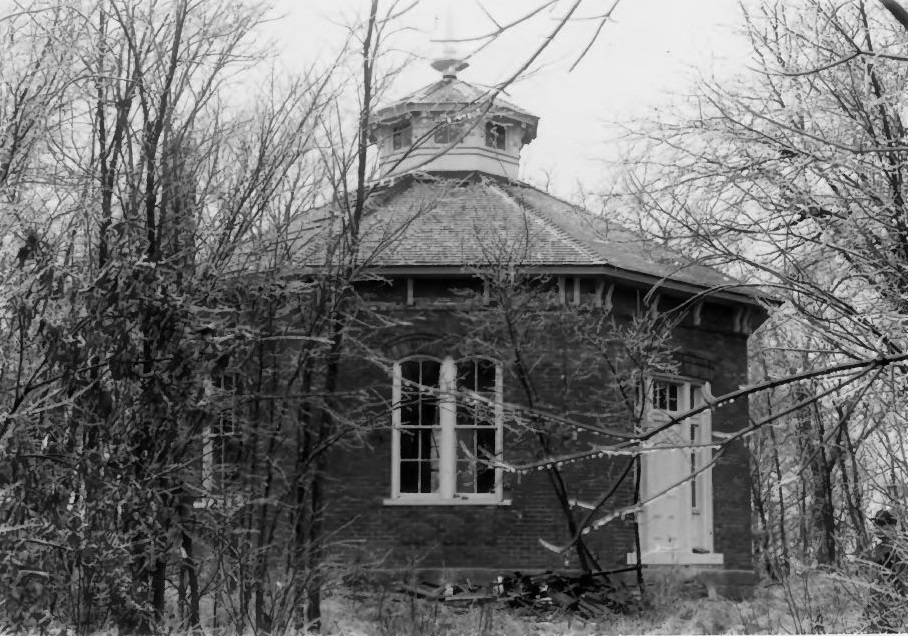
- The Octagonal Schoolhouse at Watkins Mill
- Nearest city: Excelsior Springs, Missouri
- Area: 560 acres (230 ha)
- Built: 1860
- Architect: Waltus Watkins
- NRHP reference No.: 66000416

Significant dates
- Added to NRHP: November 13, 1966
- Designated NHL: November 13, 1966
- Designated NHLD: September 28, 1983

Watkins Mill is a preserved woolen mill dating to the mid-19th century, located near Lawson, Missouri, United States. The mill is protected as Watkins Woolen Mill State Historic Site, which preserve its machinery and business records in addition to the building itself. It was designated a National Historic Landmark and added to the National Register of Historic Places in 1966 in recognition for its remarkable state of preservation. The historic site is the centerpiece of Watkins Mill State Park, which is managed by the Missouri Department of Natural Resources.

== History ==
Waltus L. Watkins established the 80-acre livestock farm he called Bethany Plantation in 1839. Watkins Mill was built in 1859-1860. Watkins built housing for the mill workers nearby, creating one of the first planned communities in North America. The community was effectively self-sufficient, the mill producing yarn and wool cloth. The mill operated at capacity until 1886, two years after Watkins' death. From 1886 to the turn of the twentieth century production declined. Nearly all of the mill machinery has been preserved, including a 65-horsepower steam engine that powered the factory.

The site also includes the Watkins house, dating to 1850. The twelve-room, 2½-story house includes three staircases, the main stair detailed in carved walnut. It remained a Watkins family home until 1945.

The Franklin School, or Octagonal School, is an octagonal schoolhouse built in 1856 and used by the Watkins family and their employees until the mid-1870s, when it became a residence for mill workers. The unusual octagonal building was built of locally manufactured brick on Watkins land.

The Watkins family also donated the land for Mt. Vernon Baptist Church, built in 1871 to replace a log church dating to the 1850s. Of the $5000 construction cost, more than half was donated by Watkins.

After going through several changes in ownership, the state of Missouri took possession of the property, creating a 1,442-acre (584 ha) state park in 1964. It was named a National Mechanical Engineering Historic Landmark in 1980.

== Gallery ==
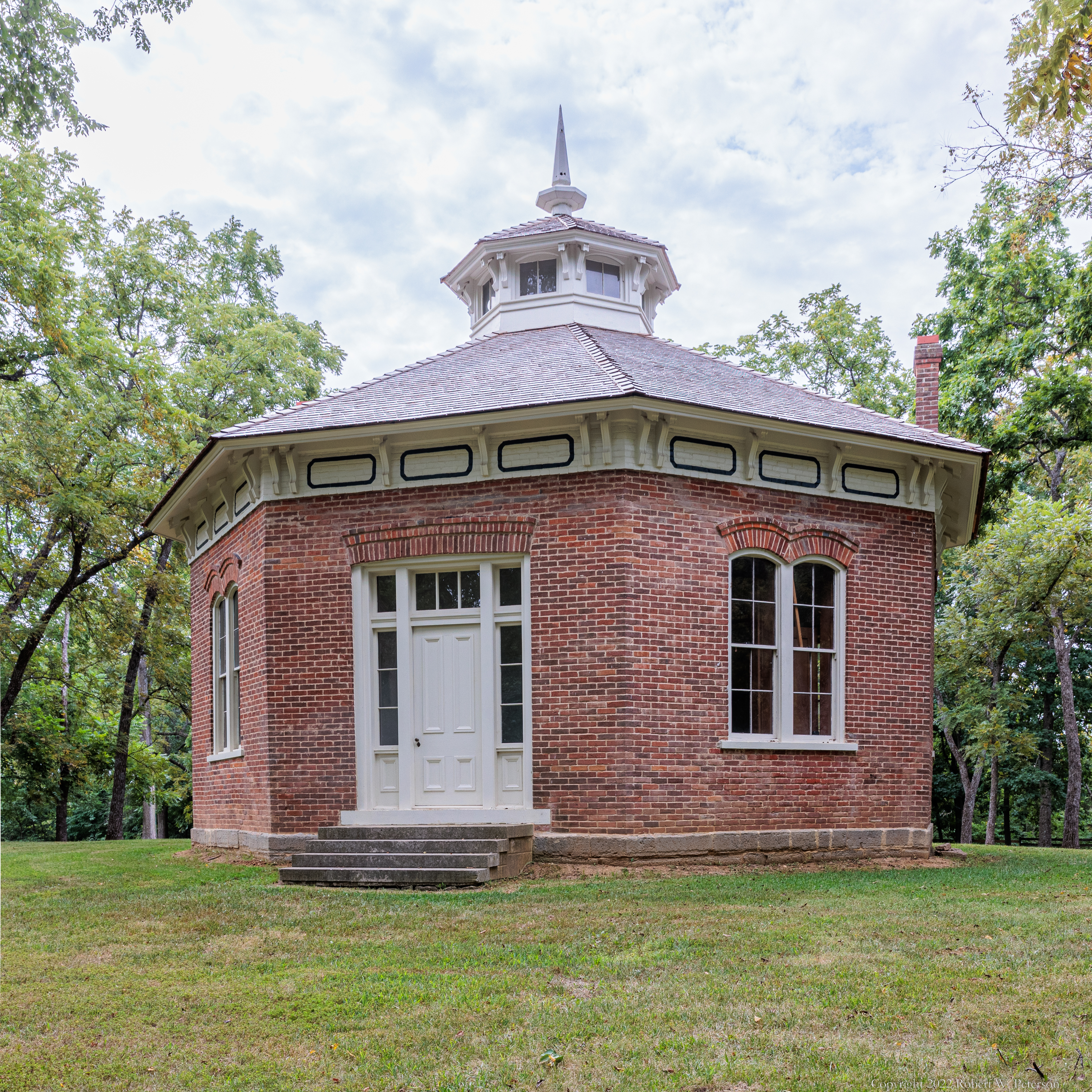
The octagonal Franklin School building. In 1842 the Franklin School District was established. Around 1856 this 8-sided building replaced a log schoolhouse. Franklin Academy became a public school in 1870 when a public school system was established in the area.

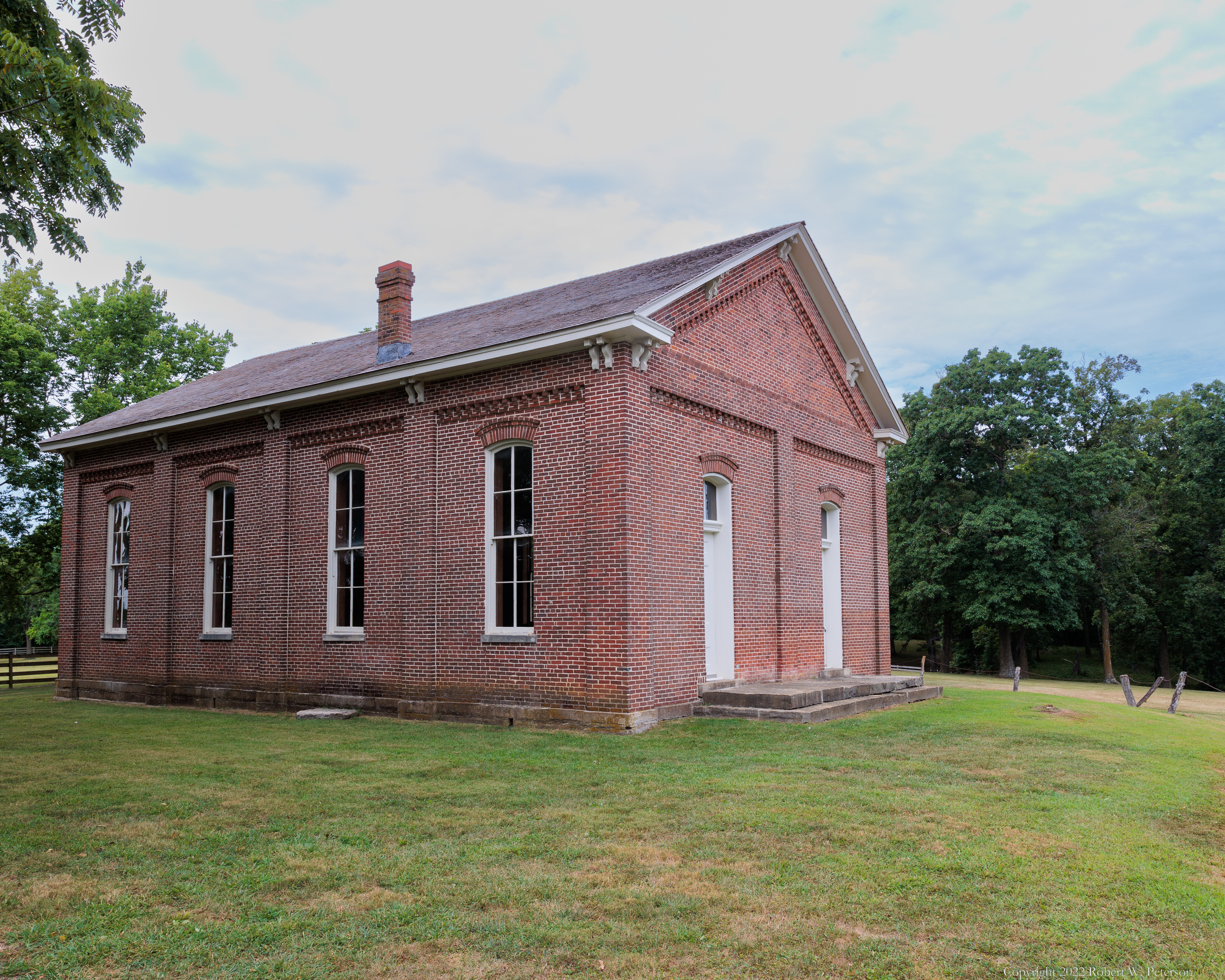
Located on the Watkins property, the Mt. Vernon Missionary Baptist Church was established in 1857. In 1871 at a cost of $6,000 this building replaced a building destroyed by fire.

== Activities and amenities ==
The state parks offers camping, a 100-acre (40 ha) lake for fishing and swimming, a 3.8-mile (6.1 km) asphalt bicycling and walking trail that follows the shoreline of the lake, and a separate 3.5-mile (5.6 km) equestrian trail.
