= Morris State Park =

State park in the US state of Missouri

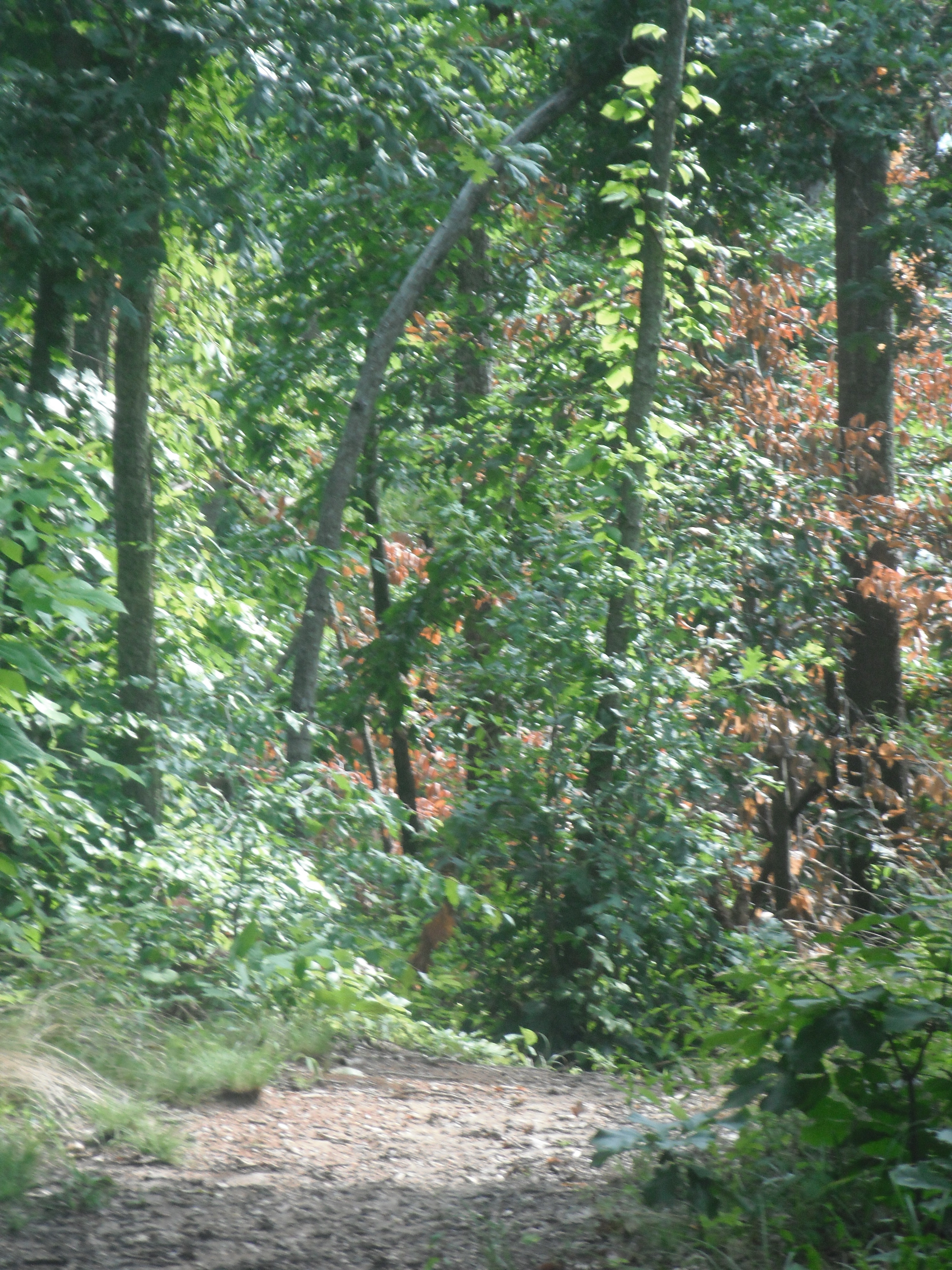

- Location within Missouri Location within the United States
- Location: Dunklin County, Missouri, United States
- Coordinates: 36°33′13″N 90°2′41″W
- Area: 161.22 acres (65.24 ha)
- Established: 2000
- Administrator: Missouri Department of Natural Resources
- Visitors: 5,244 (in 2023)
- Website: Official website

Morris State Park is a public recreation area consisting of 161 acres (65 ha) in Dunklin County, Missouri. The state park preserves a section of Crowley's Ridge, a unique geologic feature of southeast Missouri and northeast Arkansas. The state park offers a two-mile hiking trail along a portion of the "geologic oddity." The park is named for businessman Jim D. Morris, who donated the parcel to the state in 1999.
