= Missouri Department of Natural Resources =

Agency of the state of Missouri, United States

Agency overview
- Formed: 1974
- Headquarters: Jefferson City, Missouri
- Agency executive: Kurt Schaefer, Director
- Website: dnr.mo.gov

The Department's Division of State Parks manages parks and historic sites throughout the state.

The Missouri Department of Natural Resources (MoDNR) is a state department of Missouri responsible for protecting, managing, and interpreting the state's natural, cultural, and energy resources. The department consists of multiple divisions including the Division of Environmental Quality, the Division of Geology and Land Survey, the Division of State Parks, the Environmental and Energy Resources Authority, and the Field Services Division. Through its State Parks Division, the department oversees and operates Missouri state parks and historic sites.

== Divisions ==
- Division of Administrative Support
- Division of Energy
- Division of Environmental Quality
- Missouri Geological Survey
- Missouri State Parks
