= Missouri Mines State Historic Site =

Historic mining complex located in Park Hills, Missouri

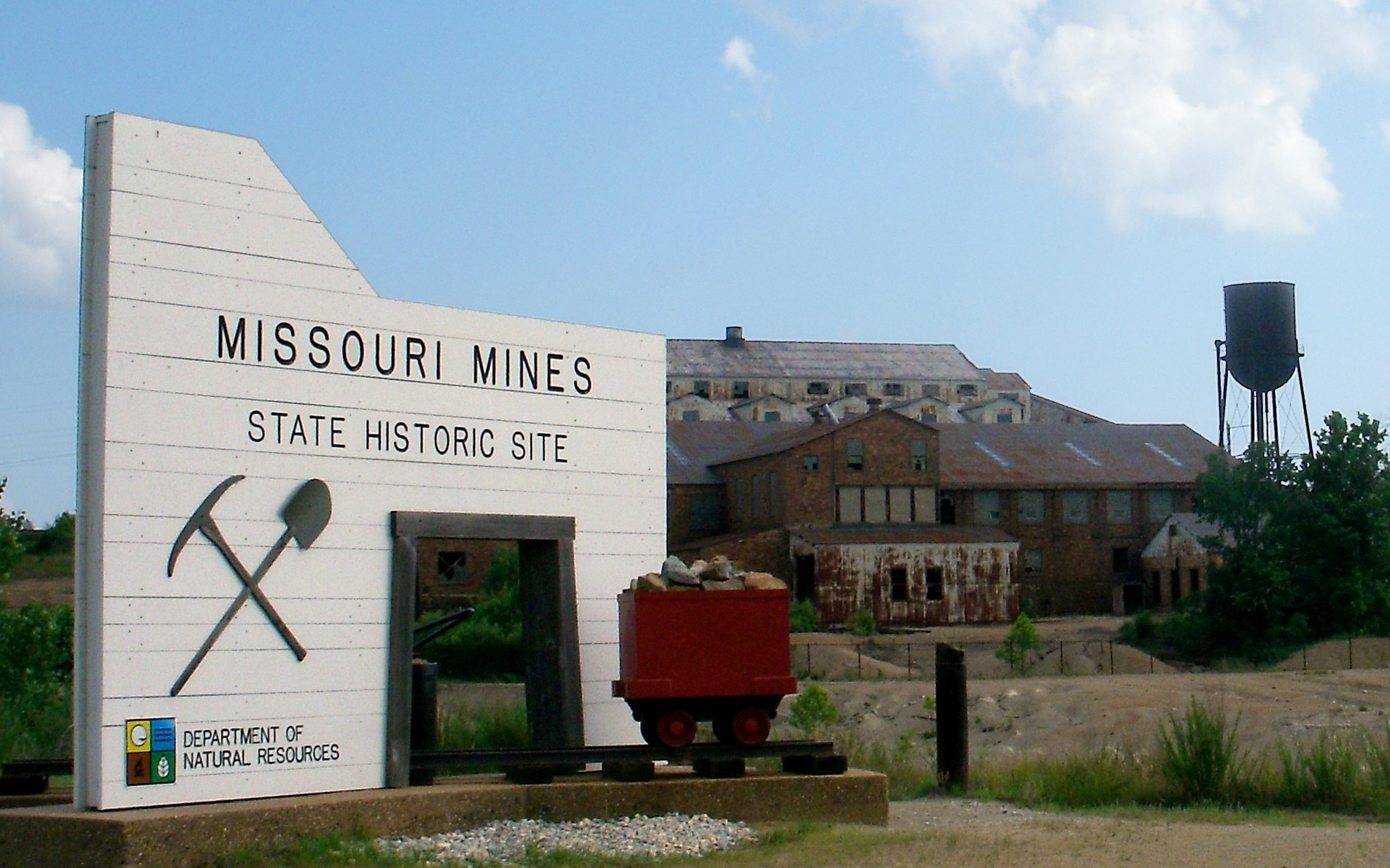

- Location within Missouri Location within the United States
- Location: Park Hills, St. Francois County, Missouri, United States
- Coordinates: 37°50′18″N 90°30′33″W
- Area: 64.59 acres (26.14 ha)
- Established: 1976
- Visitors: 19,819 (in 2022)
- Operator: Missouri Department of Natural Resources
- Website: Missouri Mines State Historic Site

Missouri Mines State Historic Site occupies Federal Mill No. 3 in Park Hills, Missouri, United States, which processed the lead and zinc ore that was mined in the immediate area for many decades. The site's old power building features a geological and mining history museum and interpretive center focusing on the state's historic Old Lead Belt.

The plant was built by the Federal Lead Co. in 1906-1907 and subsequently bought by competitor St. Joseph Lead Company in 1923. The mill was retired in 1972 as much of the ore in the area had been mined and major operations were moving west. In 1975, the land was donated to the state of Missouri for recreational use. Much of the land was considered too damaged for return to a natural state and so became set aside for off-roading vehicles as St. Joe State Park, while the mill site was designated an interpretive center.

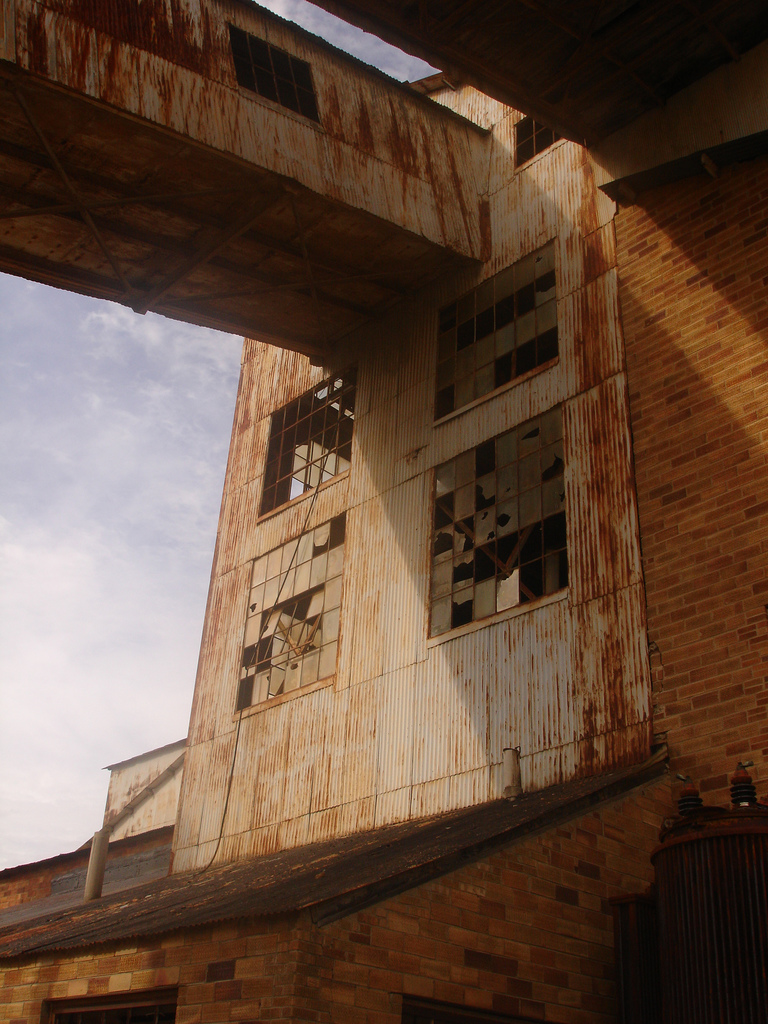
Building and conveyor

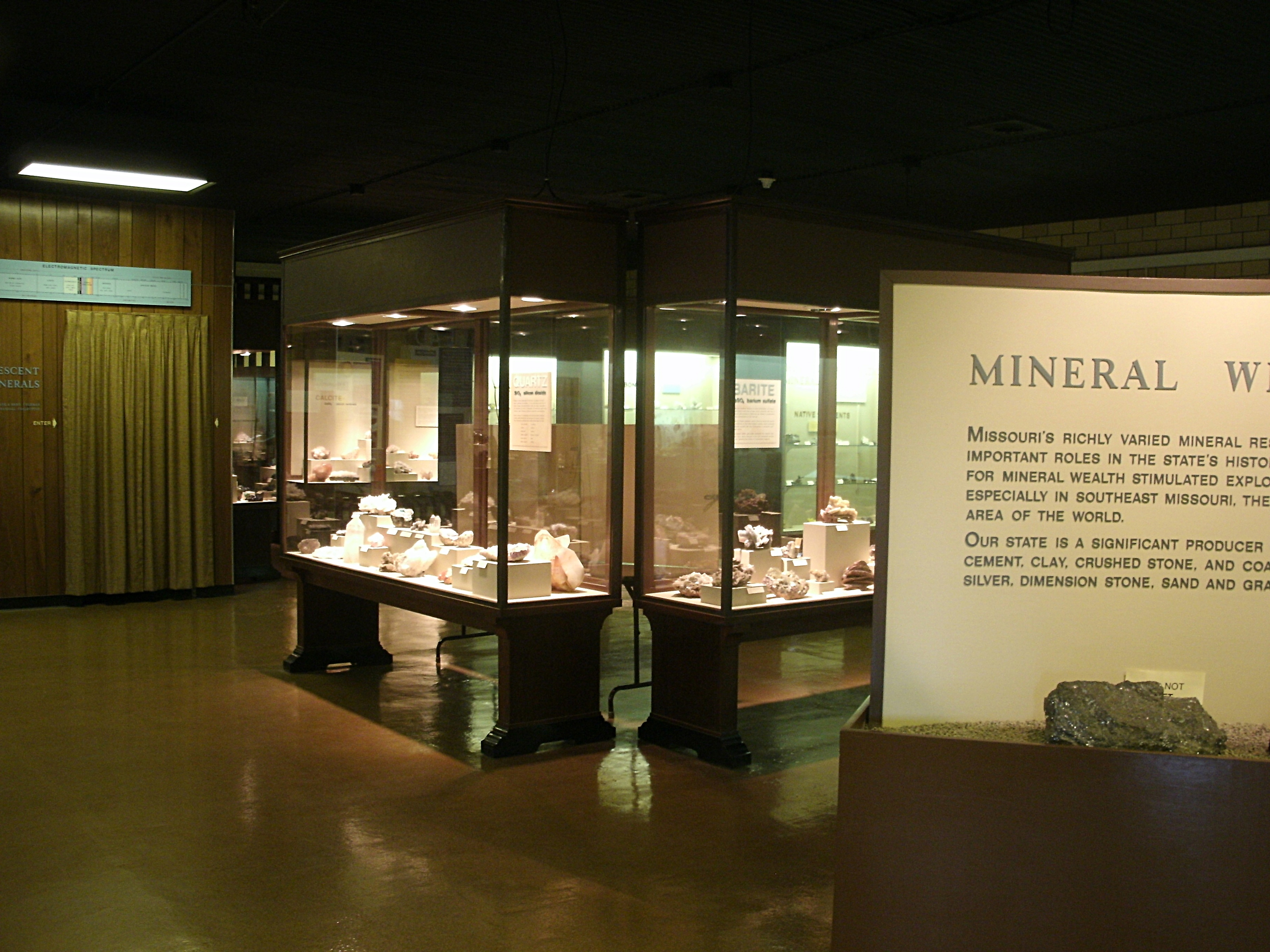
Mineral museum

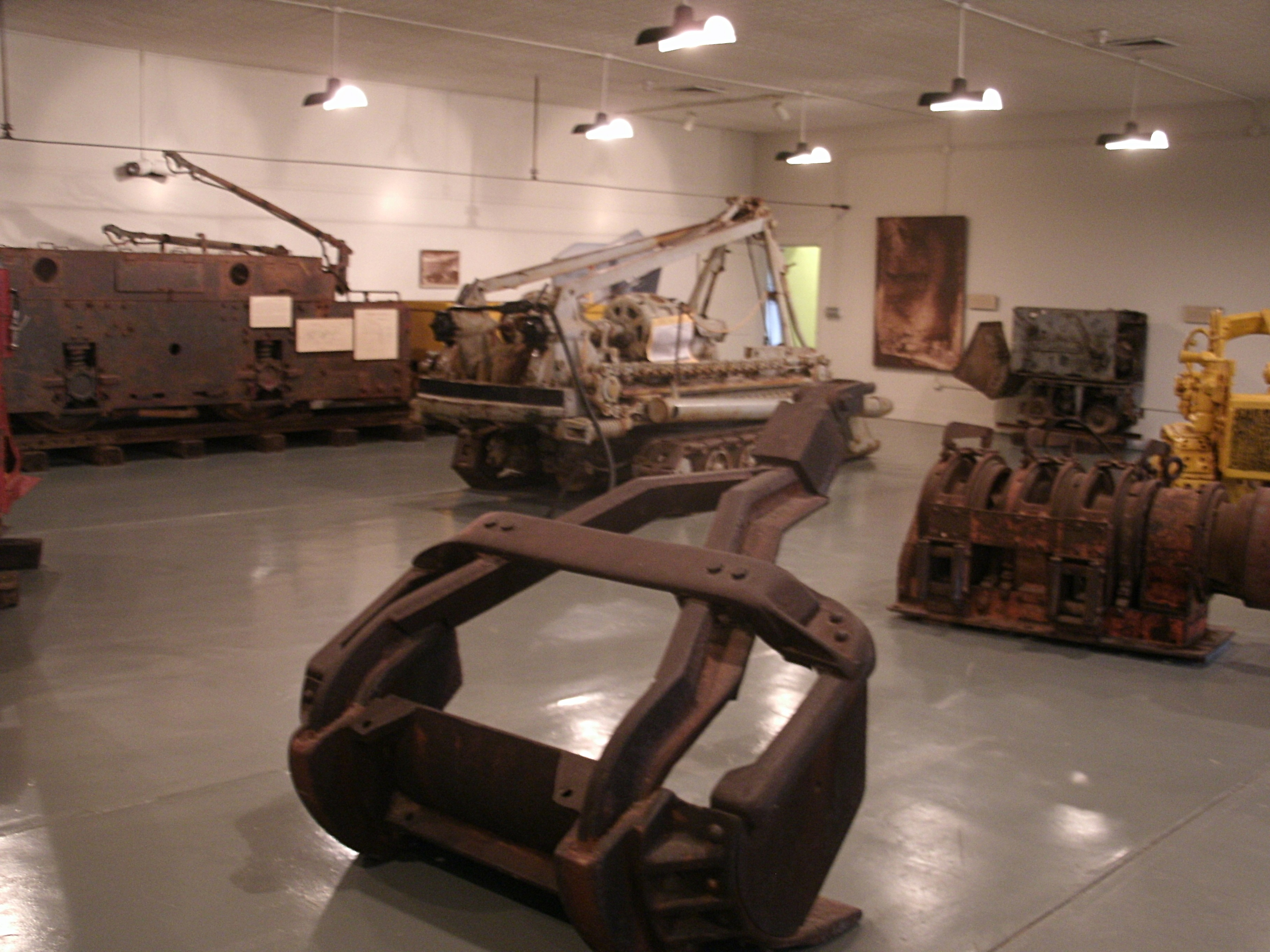
Mining equipment on display

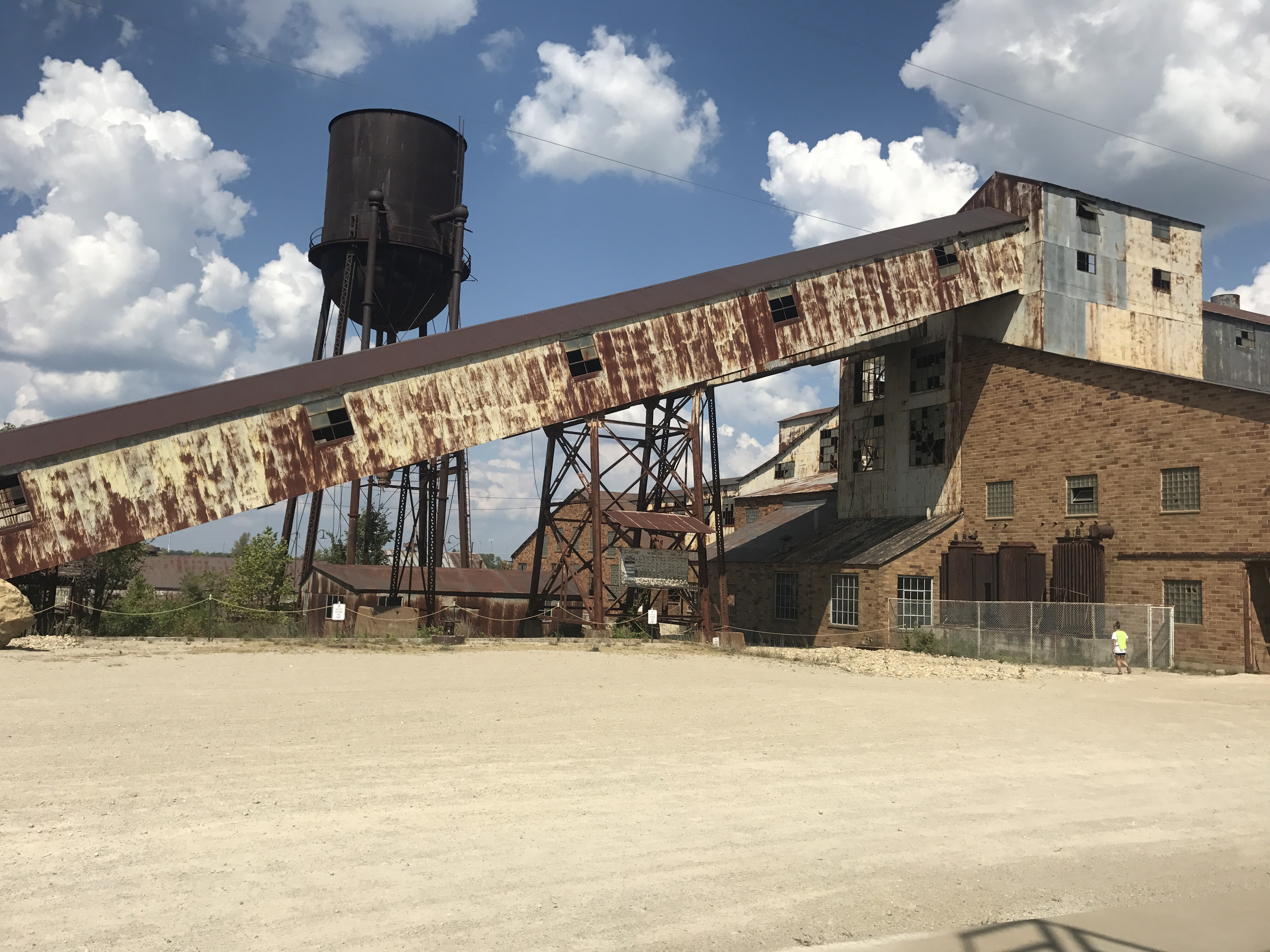
One of the large buildings next to the museum.

== See also ==
- Mining in the United States
- Desloge Consolidated Lead Company
