= Mineral Area College =

Community college in Park Hills, Missouri, U.S.

Coordinates: 37°50′45″N 90°28′55″W

- Other name: MAC
- Former name: Flat River Junior College
- Type: Public community college
- Established: 1965; 61 years ago
- Accreditation: Higher Learning Commission
- President: Joe Gilgour
- Students: 2,640 (Fall 2020)
- Location: Park Hills, Missouri, United States
- Colors: Red, Black, and White
- Sporting affiliations: NJCAA Division I
- Mascot: Kirby the Cardinal
- Website: www.mineralarea.edu

Mineral Area College is a public junior college in Park Hills, Missouri. Students can participate in the 2+2 programs offered on campus by Central Methodist University or University of Missouri-St. Louis. The college enrolled 2,640 students in 2019.

== History ==
Founded in 1922 as Flat River Junior College, the original college was created by the Flat River Board of Education to train teachers and offer two year college education to graduating high school students. In the 1960s, enrollment had increased and a need for a larger facility was assessed. Through a popular vote by residents in six public school district in 1965, the Flat River Junior college was transitioned to Mineral Area College. In 1966 the career and technical education division was formed and nursing programs were then added in 1967. The current main campus outside of Leadington, MO was purchased in 1967 and operations moved to the larger campus in 1970. The college grew throughout the 80s and 90s, adding more buildings and programs to better meet the needs of the area. College Park was added in 2000 and the Fredericktown Outreach Center was built in 2010. Now, MAC has over 11,000 alumni and has graduated students from many different states and countries.

Mineral Area College Presidents
no.	Name	Term
1	H. Tudor Westover	1965-1966
2	Richard Caster	1966-1982
3	Dixie Kohn	1982-2001
4	Terry Barnes	2001-2006
5	Steven Kurtz	2007-2018
6	Joseph Gilgour	2019–Present

== Locations ==
=== Main Campus ===
The main campus is located within St. Francois County in Park Hills, MO, 86 miles north of Cape Girardeau, MO and 66 miles south of St. Louis, MO.

The 226-acre main campus has a quadrangle design encompassing a courtyard for student activities. The building layout is composed of the C.H. Cozean Library, "The Bob" Robert E. Sechrest Sr. Field House, Fine Arts building, and Academic Hall. Other Park Hills campus buildings include the Early Learning Academy, the Law Enforcement Academy, the Industry and Technology Center, the North College Center, TRiO building, and welding building.

=== Fredericktown Outreach Center ===
The Fredericktown Outreach Center is located off of Hwy 67 South next to Black River Electric Co-op offices.

=== Perryville Higher Education Center ===
The Perryville Higher Education Center is located in the former library building of St. Mary's of the Barrens campus.

=== Potosi Outreach Center ===
The Potosi Outreach Center is located within the Potosi High School.

=== Cape Girardeau Outreach Center ===
Mineral Area College Cape Girardeau is located next to Cape Central High School.

== Taxing district and service region ==
Mineral Area College was founded and developed as a college to support students from six school districts: North County R-1, Central R-3, Farmington R-7, Bismarck R-5, West County R-4, and Fredericktown R-1. Mineral Area College has a broad service region, but is primarily supported through portions of the voter-approved property tax revenue in the smaller taxing district. School districts have voted to join the taxing district since 1965 and students living in these districts receive reduced tuition benefits. Due to the extensive west-to-east size of the service district, voter rejections, or other economic issues, not every public school in the service district supports MAC through tax revenue, but still receive service benefits from the college.

The college is supported by taxing districts in St. Francois County, Madison County and portions of Ste. Genevieve, Washington, Jefferson and Perry counties. The service region consists of all of St. Francois, Ste. Genevieve, Perry, Madison, Iron, Washington, Shannon and Texas counties. Since 2022, the service area also includes Cape Girardeau County.

== Academics ==
Mineral Area College offers several associate degree and certificate programs for students, including Associate of Arts, Associate of Science, Associate of Applied Science, and Associate of General Studies degrees.

The college and its outreach centers are accredited by the Higher Learning Commission. Mineral Area College degrees and programs are approved by the Missouri Coordinating Board for Higher Education.

== Mineral Area Fine Arts Academy ==
The Mineral Area Fine Arts Academy was created in 2021 in a response to a void in higher education fine arts after declines in enrollment and subsequent fine arts program cancellations at Mineral Area College. The Fine Arts Academy operates on the Mineral Area College main campus and will provide classes and productions in theatre, music, and visual art.

== Mineral Area Council on the Arts (MACOA) ==
Mineral Area Council on the Arts (MACOA) began in 1982 as Mineral Area College Arts Council, a committee formed by Dixie Kohn at Mineral Area College. The group brought cultural events and a broader exposure of fine arts to the college campus. The independent Mineral Area Council on the Arts was established in 1989 and in 1990 registered its Articles of Incorporation with the State of Missouri in 1990.

In addition to the executive director, the council is led by a Board of Directors of 8 men and women. The main MACOA office is located in the Fine Arts building on the main campus of Mineral Area College.

== Athletics ==
The Mineral Area College Cardinals are represented by the mascot "Kirby the Cardinal".

Mineral Area College is a member of the National Junior College Athletic Association Division I, NJCAA Region XVI and the Missouri Community College Athletic Conference.

Athletic teams include Men and Women's Basketball, Soccer, Track & Field; Men's Baseball and Golf; Women's Softball and Volleyball; Coed E-Gaming and Cheerleading.

=== Robert E. Sechrest Sr. Field House ===
The field house on the main campus is colloquially referred to as "the Bob" by student athletes and faculty. The gym is named after Missouri Sports Hall of Fame inductee Robert "Bob" Sechrest to honor his lifetime accomplishments.

== Student life ==
=== College Park ===
College Park Residences provide independent living for students of Mineral Area College and Central Methodist University on the Park Hills campus.

=== Disc Golf ===
Mineral Area College has a large 18 hole disc golf course beginning directly off of the main parking lot. The course was designed by Al Kennon and constructed through a partnership with the college and the Boy Scouts of America.

=== Quarry Pond ===
The 2.0 acre quarry pond is located behind the baseball field off of Dixie Kohn drive. The Missouri Department of Conservation managed pond can be accessed by students and the public during daylight hours to enjoy jogging along the paved path, lounging between courses, or fishing for black bass, catfish, and sunfish.

=== Sgt. Darrell S. Cole Memorial Shooting Range ===
The Sgt. Darrell S. Cole Memorial Shooting Range is a part of the overall St. Joe State Park/Mineral Area College Shooting Range program. The shooting range's primary purpose is to provide a controlled environment for the novice to the experienced shooter that allows them to feel safe and obtain answers and assistance.

== Campus ==
=== Library ===
The building is named in honor of C. H. Cozean. Mr. Cozean was a prominent Farmington, Missouri, businessman in a family-owned business dating back to 1864. The C. H. Cozean Library now contains historical data on the Cozean family and some of the connecting families. The Library also has a display that highlights some of the rich history of the Cozean family.

=== Academic Resource Center ===
Located on the second floor of the library providing tutoring and proctoring services for MAC students.

=== TriO Programs ===
Mineral Area College hosts three TRiO programs: Upward Bound, EXCEL/Student Support Services (SSS) and Educational Talent Search. These programs, funded by the Department of Education, help eligible students overcome barriers to successfully participating in higher education. All services offered by the TRiO programs are provided at no cost to participants.

== Administration and organization ==
In 2020, the Career & Technical Education college and Arts & Sciences college were merged into one academic body under a Provost of Instruction.

The college has seven academic divisions:

- Allied Health
- Sciences
- Arts & Communication
- Business, Computers, and Mathematics
- Industry and Technology
- Human Services
- Criminal Justice and Law Enforcement

The Mineral Area College Board of Trustees is made up of locally elected individuals from the five sub-districts within the greater taxing district of the college.
