= Eugene Field School =

Eugene Field School may refer to the following places:

- Eugene Field Elementary School, in Park Ridge, Cook County, Illinois, and Park Ridge-Niles School District 64
- Eugene Field School (Park Hills, Missouri), in St. Francois County and listed on the National Register of Historic Places
- Eugene Field School (St. Louis, Missouri), listed on the National Register of Historic Places
