= Dunehampton, New York =

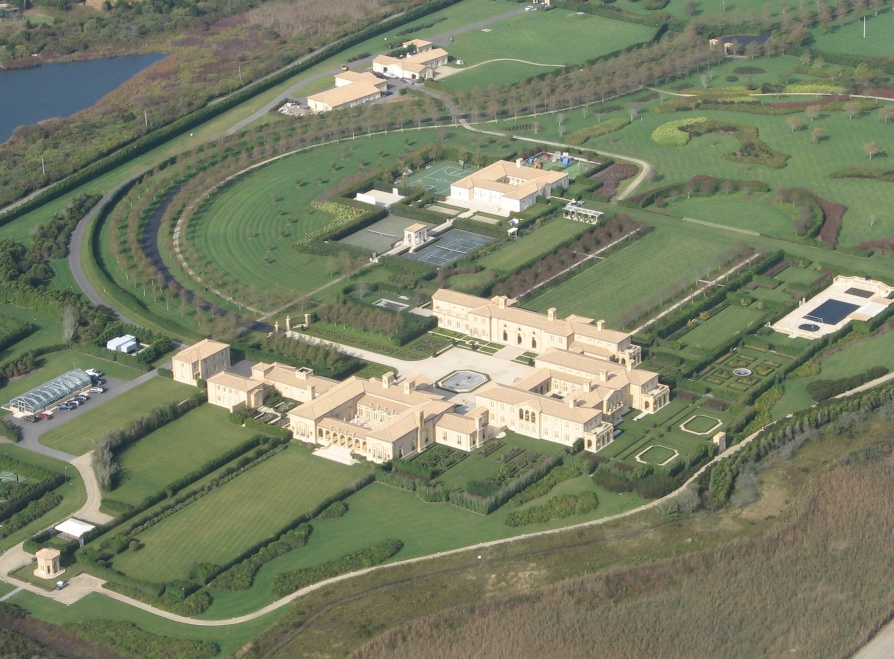
- Ira Rennert's mansion would have been in Dunehampton. It remains in Sagaponack.

- Location on Long Island Location within the state of New York
- Coordinates: 40°54′6.61″N 72°18′23.47″W
- Country: United States
- State: New York
- County: Suffolk
- Town: Southampton
- Time zone: UTC−5 (Eastern (EST))
  - Summer (DST): UTC−4 (EDT)
- Area codes: 631, 934

Dunehampton is the name of a formerly proposed village in the Town of Southampton, in Suffolk County, on the South Fork of Long Island, in New York, United States. It was proposed in 2003 to be incorporated along 5 miles (8.0 km) of Atlantic Ocean beach between Village of Southampton and the hamlet of Wainscott. The attempts to incorporate were unsuccessful.

== Overview ==
In the early 2000s, residents proposed incorporating the community as a village to maintain home rule – and out of dissatisfaction with the Town of Southampton's laws, including those pertaining to erosion and property regulations.

One of the most prominent residents along the narrow strip is Humvee tycoon Ira Rennert.

The petition to form the village was filed with the Southampton Town Supervisor Patrick A. Heaney on July 3, 2003, while residents of Sagaponack filed incorporation papers with the clerk on October 2, 2003. The two villages overlapped on the eastern portion of Dunehampton. Healy ultimately ruled that Dunehampton's application was not valid because it lacked the necessary number of signatures.

The Heaney Administration ultimately blocked Dunehampton's incorporation petition on September 16, 2003. Sagaponack's incorporation, meanwhile, moved forward; it incorporated on September 2, 2005.

The proposal also met stiff resistance from the nearby communities of Water Mill, Bridgehampton, and Sagaponack because they feared the village would impose strict parking rules on the beaches cutting them off from the ocean.

Residents of Dunehampton filed suit following the town's rejection of the incorporation proposal. Subsequent court cases have upheld the town's decisions.

== Geography ==
It would have had an area of 1,730 acres (7.0 km^{2}), and would have taken in Julie and Channel Ponds at the western edge of Southampton Village and much of Sagg Pond to its eastern end at the border with the Town of East Hampton.

== Demographics ==
The village would have included 1,079 residents and roughly 260 houses.

== See also ==
- Half Hollow Hills, New York – Another Suffolk County community which unsuccessfully attempted to incorporate as a village.
