= Doe Run Company =

American natural resources company

The Doe Run Company
- Type: Subsidiary
- Industry: Mining
- Predecessor: St. Joseph Lead Company
- Founded: 1864; 162 years ago in New York, United States
- Founders: Lyman W. Gilbert, John E. Wylie, Edmund I. Wade, Wilmot Williams, James L. Dunham and James L. Hathaway
- Headquarters: St. Louis
- Key people: Jerry L. Pyatt, Chief Executive Officer and President
- Products: Lead, copper, and zinc concentrates and lead metal and alloys
- Number of employees: 1,278
- Parent: The Renco Group, Inc.
- Website: www.doerun.com

The Doe Run Resources Corporation, known by the trade name The Doe Run Company, is a privately held natural resources company and global producer of lead, copper, and zinc concentrates. It owns four mills, six mines and a lead battery recycling plant, all in southeast Missouri, United States, and a subsidiary Fabricated Products Inc. with locations in Arizona and Washington. It also owns two former primary lead smelter sites in the U.S. that are currently being remediated. It is wholly owned by The Renco Group, Inc

== History ==
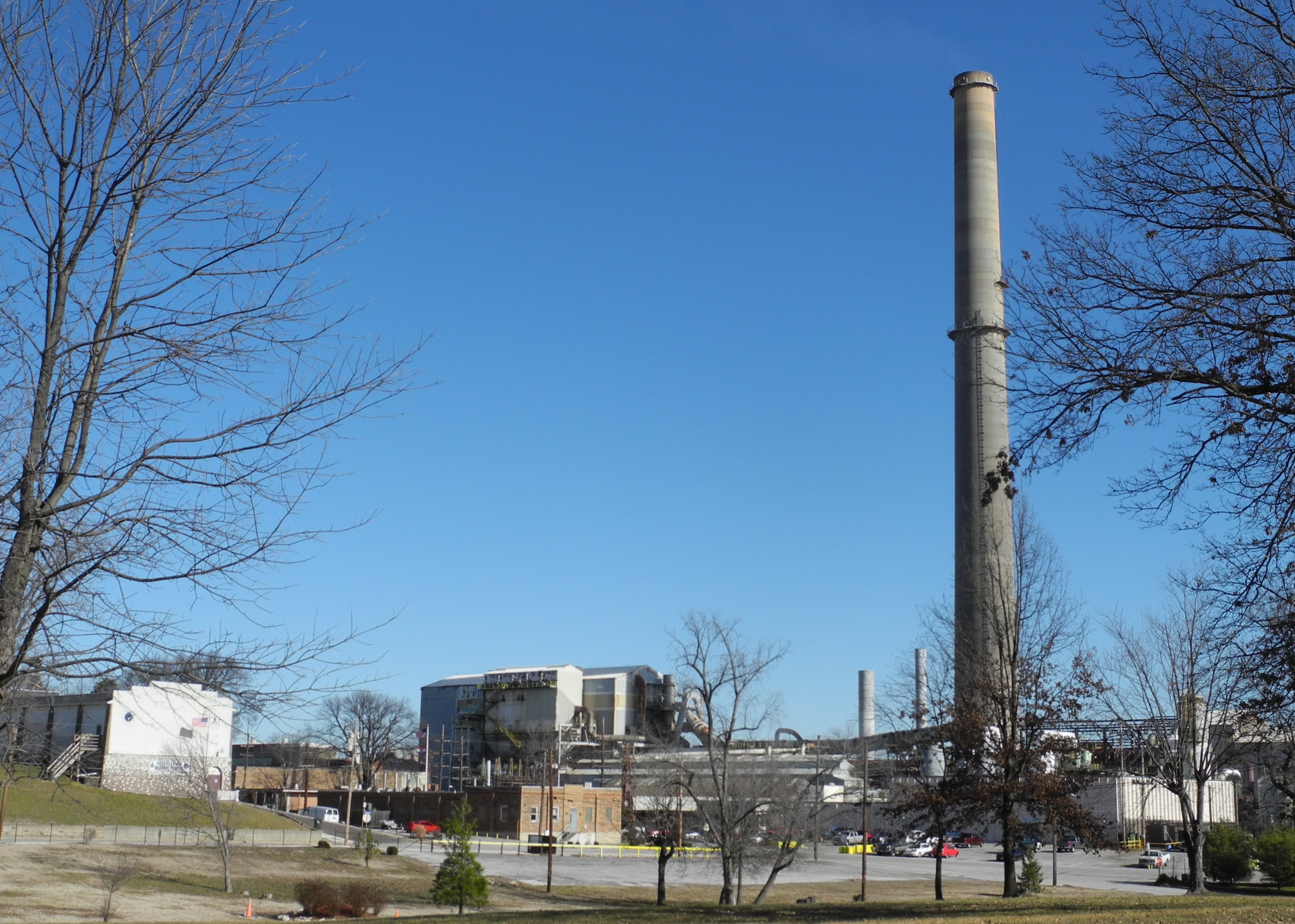
The now closed Doe Run lead smelter in Herculaneum, Missouri

The company that would become The Doe Run Company was founded as St. Joseph Lead Company in New York in 1864. In the "Old Lead Belt" of Southeast Missouri where the company operated, it was the dominant mining group. In 1887, the company purchased land to build a smelter in Herculaneum, Missouri. The lead processing smelter was built on 540 acres by the Mississippi River and began operations in 1892.

During its early history, St. Joseph Lead Company developed many tools, techniques, and safety processes that became widely adopted by the mining industry. Notable accomplishments included the roof bolt in the 1920s, and the St. Joe Shovel in 1922, which replaced hand shovels and increased daily employee productivity from 21 tons of rock to nearly 300 tons. St. Joe was also the first mining company to employ a dedicated researcher, starting in 1930, which expanded into a department.

With the gradual exhaustion of the Old Lead Belt after World War II, St. Joe explored other areas in southeastern Missouri and in 1955 found extensive deposits in an area that became known as the Viburnum Trend. The company owns six mines and four mills along the trend. Other companies also developed the area, but Doe Run owned all the mines and mills in the district by 1992.

The company changed its name to St. Joe Minerals in 1970, and was acquired by the Fluor Corporation in 1981. In 1986, St. Joe and another mining company, Homestake Lead, formed The Doe Run Company Partnership, which added Homestake's Buick mine, mill and smelter to St. Joe's operations. The Buick smelter was later converted to the Buick Resource Recycling Division for lead recycling in 1991.

The Renco Group, Inc., acquired The Doe Run Company from Fluor and renamed the company The Doe Run Resources Corporation in 1994 (although it continued to be registered to do business as "The Doe Run Company"). In 1996, Doe Run established Fabricated Products, Inc., a wholly owned subsidiary, and acquired lead fabricating facilities. The following year, Doe Run more than doubled in size with the purchase of the La Oroya smelter and Cobriza copper mine in Peru from state-controlled Centromin for $247 million. Doe Run's Peruvian holdings would eventually be separated into a separate subsidiary of the Renco Group in 2007.

In 2001, regulators reported high levels of lead around Doe Run's Herculaneum lead smelter as well as in the blood of local children. Following this finding, Doe Run undertook a large-scale cleanup effort, purchasing approximately 160 homes and replacing soil for over 700 properties to bring the site back into compliance with the U.S. Clean Air Act. In 2010, Doe Run agreed to close the Herculaneum smelter and pay $65 million for past violations of federal Clean Air and Clean Water acts. The same year, Doe Run announced plans to replace the Herculaneum smelter with an electrowinning plant. However, in 2012 these plans were put on hold indefinitely. In December 2013, Doe Run closed the Herculaneum smelter, retaining just a small operation for refining specialty alloys and maintaining the site.

After the closure of the Herculaneum primary lead smelting facility in 2013, the company altered its business model to focus on its mining and recycling operations. In 2016, citing falling prices and environmental regulations, Doe Run downsized its lead production by approximately 10 percent and eliminated 75 jobs in its Missouri facilities. In 2016, the company sold 18 acres of its former lead smelter site in Herculaneum to Riverview Commerce Park LLC for redevelopment as a commercial port. Doe Run began demolition on the five main buildings of the Herculaneum smelter in 2017 as part of its redevelopment announced in 2012.

== Operations ==
=== Overview ===
The Doe Run Company manages various parts of the lead lifecycle, including mining, milling, fabrication, and recycling, and provides lead metals, alloys and lead concentrates to companies globally. The company's headquarters are in St. Louis, Missouri, and Doe Run has holdings in Missouri, Washington and Arizona. Jerry Pyatt has been president and CEO of The Doe Run Company since 2012.

Doe Run employs approximately 1,100 people, and it invests in locals schools and infrastructure both financially and through employee community service.

=== Holdings and products ===
In the Southeast Missouri Lead District, Doe Run's mines are all on the Viburnum Trend, a 64 km long mineralized shoot with an average width of 150 meters, thickness of 3 to 30 meters and average depth of 300 meters. It is a classic Mississippi Valley type lead/zinc deposit in Cambrian carbonate rocks though it contains an unusually high proportion of lead. The principal minerals are galena (lead, PbS) and sphalerite (zinc, ZnS) with lesser amounts of chalcopyrite (copper, CuFeS_{2}). Lead concentrates from the area contain more than 75 percent lead, versus an industry average of 45 to 50 percent lead.

Doe Run owns five mines on the Viburnum Trend: Brushy Creek, Casteel, Fletcher/West Fork, Sweetwater and Mine No 29. These mines produce ore that is milled at the company's four mills to extract lead, zinc, and copper concentrates. Approximately 90 percent of the primary lead supply in the United States has been derived from the ore from these mines over the years. Following the closure of the Herculaneum smelter, metal concentrates from the mines are shipped overseas for smelting.

Doe Run's other Missouri holdings include a recycling smelter in Boss, Missouri. The secondary smelter recycles metal from old lead batteries and scrap lead. The process creates secondary lead that can be manufactured into new products.

The smelter processes about 13.5 million lead-acid batteries annually, recovering lead from the batteries for reuse. Doe Run is one of only a few North American facilities capable of removing lead from glass in cathode ray tubes that were once common in televisions and computer monitors. Safety precautions at Doe Run lead facilities include washing trucks that come into contact with lead, as well as having exposed workers shower and change clothes after each shift.

In addition to mining operations and its secondary smelter, The Doe Run Company has a wholly owned subsidiary called Fabricated Products, Inc., that has locations in Vancouver, Washington and Casa Grande, Arizona. These facilities manufacture and market fabricated metal products, including lead oxide for batteries, lead shielding used for radiation protection in hospitals, extruded shapes used in plating and pollution control, lead-lined drywall and plywood, and sheet lead for roof flashing.

Doe Run also owned a primary lead smelting facility in southeastern Missouri in the unincorpated region of Glover. The company acquired the facility in 1998 from ASARCO, but it was closed in 2003.

== Environmental issues ==
=== La Oroya, Peru ===
In 1997, Doe Run purchased a smelter and copper mine in La Oroya, Peru from the Peruvian state-controlled company Centromin during a privatization scheme. In doing so, Doe Run agreed to reduce emissions at the heavily polluted site to acceptable levels within 10 years. Despite substantial investment in site improvements and local infrastructure, health and environmental problems persisted. Studies conducted by the Director General of Environmental Health in Peru in 1999 showed that ninety-nine percent of children living in and around La Oroya have blood-lead levels that exceed acceptable amounts. The drinking water of La Oroya has been shown to contain 50 percent more lead than the levels recommended by the World Health Organization. These studies also showed high levels of air pollution, with 85 times more arsenic, 41 times more cadmium and 13 times more lead than amounts considered safe.

A 2005 study found that the town was facing a serious environmental health crisis. Not only were there elevated lead levels in children, the study also found above-normal levels of cadmium, arsenic, and antimony throughout the population. Exposure to these toxic heavy metals is associated with kidney failure, cancer, and other problems. In an interview, the author of the study said he was "scandalised" by the breadth and depth of the contamination because he "found levels of lead in children that you don't even see in the USA in adults who work with lead."

Because Doe Run Company is a major employer in the city, union leaders and the mayor were often persuaded to side with the industry and circumvent government attempts to address the pollution, but the political tide finally started to shift in the mid-2000s In 2006, the Peruvian government granted Doe Run a three-year extension to meet emission level standards. In February 2007 Doe Run's Peruvian assets were spun out as an independent subsidiary of Renco Group, Doe Run Peru. In a 2007 press release, Doe Run Peru announced that it would appeal a fine levied on it by Peruvian regulators for surpassing emissions standards in La Oroya. Jose Mogrovejo, Doe Run Peru's vice president for environmental affairs, said that infractions were not of a magnitude that could harm the environment: "Our concern is that people could infer from reading the resolution that it says we have damaged the environment, and that is not the case."

In September 2007, environmental health organization Blacksmith Institute listed La Oroya as one of the World's Worst Polluted Places because of pollution generated at Doe Run Company's poly-metallic smelting plant:

From 2007 to 2013 nearly one thousand individuals who had been exposed to toxic metals in La Oroya as minors initiated ongoing civil lawsuits in St. Louis against "Renco, Doe Run Resources Corporation (DRRC), and other companies and officers associated with Renco for injuries caused by poisonous emissions." In 2009, Doe Run Peru shut down the smelter after the Peruvian government cited the company for environmental violations. In April 2011, Renco Group filed an $800 million lawsuit against Peru, alleging Peru had violated the US-Peru Free Trade Agreement. The case was dismissed in 2016.

A settlement on behalf of 1,373 Peruvian plaintiffs was finally reached in a 19-year lawsuit on 24 June 2026, when it was announced that the firm that ran the La Oroya smelter, the Doe Run Company, a subsidiary of Rennert’s Renco Group, would pay $150m to the Peruvians, who had allegedly been subjected to lead poisoning and other toxic injuries as children.

The agreement, which was one of the longest-running transnational toxic tort cases litigated in US courts, came just before four trials in the case were due to begin.

Cardinal Pedro Barreto, who received death threats when he challenged the firm behind the smelter, told the Guardian: “This is a historic milestone. But this long-awaited justice doesn’t solve the problem faced by many children who were personally affected, especially neurologically. The money will not compensate for the harm they have suffered, but it is a sign that justice has been served.”

Jerome Schlichter, founder of the St Louis-based plaintiffs' litigation firm Schlichter Bogard, said: "This resolution is the culmination of 19 years of relentless work to obtain justice for children who were innocent victims of one of the most severe environmental disasters of the modern era.”

=== Herculaneum, Missouri ===
In 2001, the Missouri Department of Natural Resources found that street dust in the town of Herculaneum contained 30% lead. Testing the same year by the United States Environmental Protection Agency found high levels of air pollution. Test results also showed elevated levels of lead among more than half of pre-school age children who were tested living near the smelter in Herculaneum.

In 2002, Doe Run undertook a voluntary buyout of homes in the area and over the next few years purchased approximately 160 homes. In addition to the buyout, Doe Run invested $14 million in the removal of lead-contaminated soil. It replaced soil for more than 700 properties, including residences, schools, public parks, and other land. By the end of the year, Doe Run was in compliance with the Clean Air Act lead standard. According to a company representative, another $12 million was spent in 2007 in an effort to further reduce air pollution from the smelter.

In 2010, after issuance of new stricter EPA lead standards, Doe Run agreed to close the Herculaneum smelter and pay $65 million to correct past violations of the federal Clean Air and Clean Water acts. The same year, the company announced plans to replace the Herculaneum smelter with an electrowinning plant, which would replace smelting with a contained wet chemical process, reducing emissions by nearly 99 percent. The plans were a result of research the company had been conducting for decades to find a new way to produce lead. Doe Run invested $30 million in developing new technology until the plan was put on hold in 2012.

In December 2013, Doe Run closed the Herculaneum smelter, though refining operations of specialty alloys continue. The company allocated more than $8 million for cleanup of the property following its closure. Between 2010 and 2015, Doe Run spent $289 million on environmental expenditures across its various holdings. The funds have been used in part for remediating old mining sites and for the construction of water treatment plants to treat waste from mining operations.
