= Ira Rennert =

American businessman

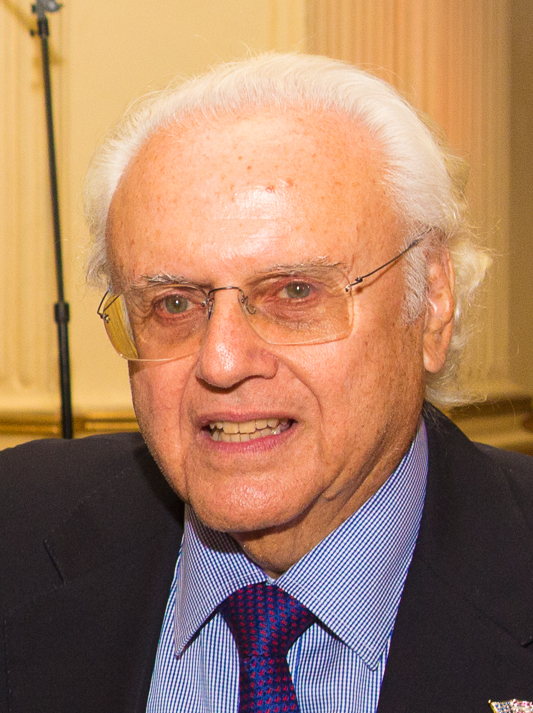
- Born: May 31, 1934 (age 92); New York City, US
- Education: Brooklyn College; New York University
- Occupations: Chairman and CEO, Renco Group
- Spouse: Ingeborg Hanna
- Children: 3

Ira Leon Rennert (born May 31, 1934) is an American billionaire businessman, and the chairman and CEO of Renco Group. As of November 2024, Forbes estimated his net worth at US$3.8 billion.

== Early life ==
Rennert's parents were Jewish immigrants from Poland and Romania. He graduated from Brooklyn College in 1954, and earned his master's degree from New York University Stern School of Business in 1956, where he later was on the board of overseers.

== Early career ==
Rennert started his career as a credit analyst on Wall Street in 1956. He also was a partner at Rubin, Rennert & Co. before launching his own business, I. L. Rennert & Co., in 1962. At this time he was censured by the National Association of Securities Dealers for operating with insufficient capital. It occurred again in 1963, and as a result, his license was revoked on November 29, 1964, effectively banning him from the securities industry. According to a company spokesman, Jon Goldberg: "Due to market conditions, the firm found itself in violation of the net capital rule and Rennert raised capital and put it into the firm to bring it into compliance. However, the firm once more fell beneath the net-capital requirements and he shut the company down."

== Junk bond financing ==
Michael Milken—as a bond trader for Drexel Burnham Lambert—was successful in selling high-risk, high-yield bonds issued by struggling or undercapitalized companies. Integrated Resources raised $2 billion in junk bonds financed by Milken but ultimately collapsed amid scandal and defaulted on $1 billion of bond debt in May 1989 (see the 1991 book Den of Thieves about the junk bond scandal). As an outside board member, Rennert was not dragged down by the collapse and began to raise junk bonds on his own behalf to finance acquisitions for the Renco Group.

Rennert's strategy for building Renco was to acquire all the shares of struggling companies and to finance the acquisition by issuing junk bonds. Along the way, he paid substantial dividends out of the business to himself. In a series of junk bond issues since 1995, Renco's subsidiaries have borrowed an estimated $1.1 billion and transferred $322 million (29 percent) to Renco Group, according to documents filed with the U.S. Securities and Exchange Commission (SEC). Backed by blue-chip mutual funds and hedge funds such as John Hancock Funds LLC and Putnam Investment Management LLC, Rennert now didn't have to invest much of his own money. His purchase of AM General in 1992 was made with a down payment of just $10 million. In 1994, Fluor Corp. of Los Angeles sold the Doe Run Company to Renco, with the latter paying $52 million in cash, and approximately $60 million in debt payable over an eight-year period. In 1997, Doe Run went on to pay $247 million for a similarly environmentally troubled lead smelting complex from the Peruvian government, as well as borrowing more money to service its Fluor Corporation debt. And in 1998, Doe Run sold $305 million in junk bonds for financing its Peruvian acquisition as well as more lead mines in Missouri (according to Doe Run filings with the SEC). Since 1998 most Renco financings have been bank debt.

== Transactions and subsidiaries ==
=== WCI Steel ===
In 1988, Renco bought a Warren (Ohio) steel company from its bankrupt parent, LTV Steel Co., for a price tag of $140 million. This company then became WCI Steel Inc., and Rennert was able to ultimately sell bonds totaling $300 million, paying $108 million of the proceeds as a dividend to Renco. In 1998, Renco Steel Holdings Inc. was created as a holding company for WCI. The holding company then sold $120 million in junk bonds, this time paying an additional $100 million dividend to Renco.

At the time of the bankruptcy, if the pension plan had been terminated, the Pension Benefit Guaranty Corporation calculated a $117 million shortfall. Despite losing the company, Renco agreed to assume responsibility for the existing pension plan, with ongoing support from WCI. Newspaper reports speculated that the Pension Benefit Guaranty Corporation had threatened to put a lien on Rennert's personal estate in order to ensure the steelworkers' benefits. Harbinger sold the business to Severstal, a steelmaker based in Russia.

=== MagCorp/US Magnesium ===
In 1989, Renco acquired the U.S.'s largest magnesium producer in Utah. Removing minerals from the water of the Great Salt Lake, Magnesium Corp. uses chemicals to refine the magnesium used in products ranging from bombs to bicycles. In 1996, Renco established Renco Metals, Inc. as a holding company for Magnesium Corp. and issued $150 million in bonds. Just like WCI, the company paid Renco $90 million in dividends by the year end.

In 2001, the Department of Justice filed suit against Magnesium Corp. for multiple violations of hazardous waste law, and also it cited Rennert's removal of money from Magnesium Corp. through the bond issue, "leaving the companies insolvent and unable to pay their bills". The suit went on until 2007, when a judge ruled in favor of Renco and against the DOJ.

On August 17, 2010, a 10th Circuit Court of Appeals ruling overturned a District Court judge's October 17, 2007, decision that the U.S. Magnesium facility in Rowley, Utah was not illegally disposing five wastes. The initial lawsuit DOJ filed on behalf of EPA in 2001 claimed U.S. Magnesium was not following regulations promulgated under the Resource Conservation and Recovery Act of 1976, which dictates how waste byproducts must be disposed. Renco continues to operate the business under the name US Magnesium. At this point, US Magnesium is the only magnesium producer in the United States.

The EPA published its proposal to place the US Magnesium facility on the National Priorities List (NPL, a "Superfund site" under CERCLA) in the Federal Register on September 3, 2008. The National Priorities List (NPL) is a list of places, commonly known as "superfund sites," considered national priorities for environmental remediation because of known or threatened releases of hazardous substances. USM filed its petition for review of the listing in the United States Court of Appeals for the District of Columbia Circuit on November 5, 2009. On January 14, 2011, the United States Court of Appeals sided with the EPA and upheld placing the site on the National Priority List.

=== AM General ===
In 1993, Renco acquired AM General from the LTV Corporation which helped LTV emerge from bankruptcy. Terms included a $67.5 million cash payment with the remainder to be paid in various forms over a 10-year period. AM General produced vehicles for industrial, military and government use, including the Humvee. On August 20, 2004, it was announced that Ronald Perelman's MacAndrews & Forbes Holdings company would buy 70% of AM General from Renco. The deal reportedly cost close to US$1 billion.

== Environmental track record ==
=== United States ===
The Renco Group's environmental record in the U.S. related to Doe Run provides a good example of this development. In 1998, the EPA placed Renco Group business holdings 10th on the nation's largest polluter list primarily because of emissions from US Magnesium in Utah (formerly MagCorp). (US Magnesium was purchased by Renco in 1989 in the year in which its emissions peaked at 119,000 tons per year.) By 1998, the year the Renco was placed on the EPA list, it had reduced emissions at US Magnesium by 50%. By 2005, the most recent year of data released by the EPA, emissions had been reduced 97%.

In 2001, the Justice Department and EPA filed suit against Renco. They demanded nearly $1 billion in fines, alleging MagCorp (a Renco Metals Inc. subsidiary) dumped toxic waste in ditches and ponds on the Great Salt Lake. The suit claimed PCB-laced sludge and dust choked the plant's plumbing, wastewater ponds, landfill and ditches, where contaminants were 12 times the allowed limit for accidental release. MagCorp maintained it was exempt from the federal Resource Conservation and Recovery Act, which requires companies to monitor certain kinds of hazardous waste. Magcorp declared Chapter 11 bankruptcy shortly after the lawsuit began and a federal judge allowed Rennert to restructure MagCorp—now U.S. Magnesium—which exempted it from previous legal liability. The EPA suit, however, remained outstanding until October 2007 when a federal judge ruled against the EPA and the Justice Department and in favor of Renco and MagCorp / US Magnesium.

Today, US Magnesium is the third-largest magnesium producer in the world. Its environmental improvements and recent track record have been substantial and include a reduction of emissions by 90% since 2000 (97% since 1989). The EPA data recognizes this as the single largest reduction in air emissions in the category of hazardous air pollutants since the TRI began in 1987 at any single facility. The energy improvements in US Magnesium's manufacturing process have also caused a net reduction of 100,000 tons per year of carbon dioxide emissions. US Magnesium was the recipient of a 2004 Climate Protection Award from the EPA and won an MEP award in 2006 for Environmental Consciousness.

Another US unit of Renco also faced environmental issues in Herculaneum, Missouri and has made substantial improvements. Locals in Herculaneum claimed their children were suffering from lead poisoning traceable to toxic emissions coming from Renco's Doe Run lead smelting plant, which had been in operations locally since 1892. In 2000, the EPA and the Missouri Department of Natural Resources tested area lead levels and ordered Doe Run to clean up locations where lead levels exceeded EPA standards. A 2002 study showed more than half of the children living within a quarter mile of the smelter had high blood-lead levels. Doe Run agreed to buy 160 homes in the contaminated area around the smelter at a cost of more than $10 million. An EPA fact sheet noted the following: "Since 2001, EPA, MDNR and The Doe Run Company have addressed lead contamination in Herculaneum through a series of actions which have included residential soil replacements, home interior cleanups, and a voluntary residential buyout program. EPA and MDNR continue to work with Doe Run to address stabilization, erosion control, flood protection, stormwater collection and treatment, and wetland mitigation related to the slag pile area at the site. EPA and MDNR are also working with Doe Run to address soil recontamination of residences near the smelter and contamination along city haul routes." In the first quarter of 2007, Doe Run met all of the National Ambient Air Quality Standards (NAAQS). By 2008, the conditional approval proposed, which covered air dispersion model selection as well as meteorological and emissions inventory data, among others, for the operation of the smelter was incorporated to the 2007 Consent Judgment between the company and the state of Missouri. In 2013, Doe Run shut down its lead smelter, entirely discontinuing emissions in Missouri.

=== Peru ===
Doe Run, Peru, (a Renco Group holding) operated a smelting plant in La Oroya, Peru until 2010, that had similar types of environmental challenges to those faced in Herculaneum, but on a larger scale. The La Oroya smelter began operations in 1922 and was operated for many years by Centromin, a Peruvian government agency, without any environmental controls.

The smelter was sold to Doe Run in 1997 primarily because the Peruvian government passed a law that required environmental improvement at the business. This improvement was beyond the economic and technical capability of Centromin. As part of the sale to Renco, Centromin agreed to pay to remediate pre-existing (pre-1997) environmental problems and Doe Run Peru agreed to make substantial environmental investments. These investments were estimated to be approximately $100 million at the time of the deal.

In the end, Doe Run ended up investing more than $300 million in environmental remediation during its ownership and was not able to clean up the site to achieve the standards required by Peruvian law. La Oroya was and remains a very polluted site. The Blacksmith Institute placed La Oroya on its list of ten most polluted places in the world, along with Chernobyl, Ukraine. In August 2007, it was reported that air levels of arsenic were 85 times more than the "safe" level, cadmium 41 times, and lead 13 times more. A study by St. Louis University scientists found that 97 percent of children in La Oroya suffer from mental and physical deficiencies related to their exposure to polluted air.

Ultimately, Doe Run Peru was a bad investment for Renco on many counts. Renco received substantial negative publicity regarding its ownership and the environmental problems in La Oroya. The environmental problems were not solved despite huge investment by Renco, and Renco never made any financial profit from its investment.

Doe Run Peru is currently in a dispute with the Peruvian government which in part relates to Doe Run's claims that Centromin did not live up to its obligations with regard to cleaning up the pre-existing pollution.

A settlement on behalf of 1,373 Peruvian plaintiffs was finally reached in a 19-year lawsuit on 24 June 2026, when it was announced that the firm that ran the La Oroya smelter, the Doe Run Company, a subsidiary of Rennert’s Renco Group, would pay $150m to the Peruvians, who had allegedly been subjected to lead poisoning and other toxic injuries as children.

The agreement, which was one of the longest-running transnational toxic tort cases litigated in US courts, came just before four trials in the case were due to begin.

Cardinal Pedro Barreto, who received death threats when he challenged the firm behind the smelter, told the Guardian: "This is a historic milestone. But this long-awaited justice doesn't solve the problem faced by many children who were personally affected, especially neurologically. The money will not compensate for the harm they have suffered, but it is a sign that justice has been served".

Jerome Schlichter, founder of the St Louis-based plaintiffs' litigation firm Schlichter Bogard, said: "This resolution is the culmination of 19 years of relentless work to obtain justice for children who were innocent victims of one of the most severe environmental disasters of the modern era".

== Philanthropy ==
Ira Rennert ranks #818 on Forbes magazine's list of the world's billionaires. He also ranks #29 on The Jerusalem Post list of the World's 50 Richest Jews.

Rennert and his wife Ingeborg have made many charitable donations to various organizations. They donated $5 million to establish the Wiesel Center at Boston University and $250,000 to the Lincoln Center. They also gave over $1 million to the World Trade Center Memorial and established the Rennert Entrepreneurial Institute of Sy Syms School of Business at Yeshiva University. They have endowed chairs at several different universities, including a chair in Jewish studies at Barnard College, a chair in Aging Research at Albert Einstein College of Medicine, a chair in Stem Cell Biology at Albert Einstein College of Medicine, and the Ira Rennert Professorship of Business at Columbia University. They also established the Ira Leon Rennert Professor of Entrepreneurial Finance at New York University and founded the Ingeborg Rennert Center for Jerusalem Studies at Bar-Ilan University.

The Rennerts also helped to fund the construction of The Western Wall Heritage Foundation in Jerusalem (the visitor center is called The Ingeborg and Ira Leon Rennert Hall of Light). Rennert's wife and children are named as the donors of The Jonas Mendel (Yonah Menachem Ben Mendel) Rennert Memorial Chapel at the Center for Jewish History. The Rennerts are known to have donated to Rabbi Aharon Bina's new yeshiva in Israel, Yeshivat Netiv Aryeh, and are additionally honored with a plaque as well as their family upon entrance into the building. They also donated hundreds of Torah scrolls to communities in Israel. The family also funded the construction for a new mikvah at the Fifth Avenue Synagogue, which was completed in May 2010.

== Political activity ==
Rennert is a major Republican donor. He has contributed money to John McCain, Rudy Giuliani and other candidates.

Together with his spouse, Rennert contributed $900,000 to Donald Trump's 2020 presidential campaign.

== Personal life ==
=== Family ===
Rennert is married to Ingeborg Hanna Rennert, a former airline ticket agent who is a convert to Judaism. She is the director of Lincoln Center for the Performing Arts, Inc. They have three children:

- Tamara Rennert Winn, married to Randall Winn, co-founder of Capital IQ (now S&P Capital IQ)
- Yonina Rennert Davidson
- Ari Rennert

Rennert is a member of the Fifth Avenue Synagogue, an Orthodox synagogue where he is also honorary chairman.

=== Houses ===
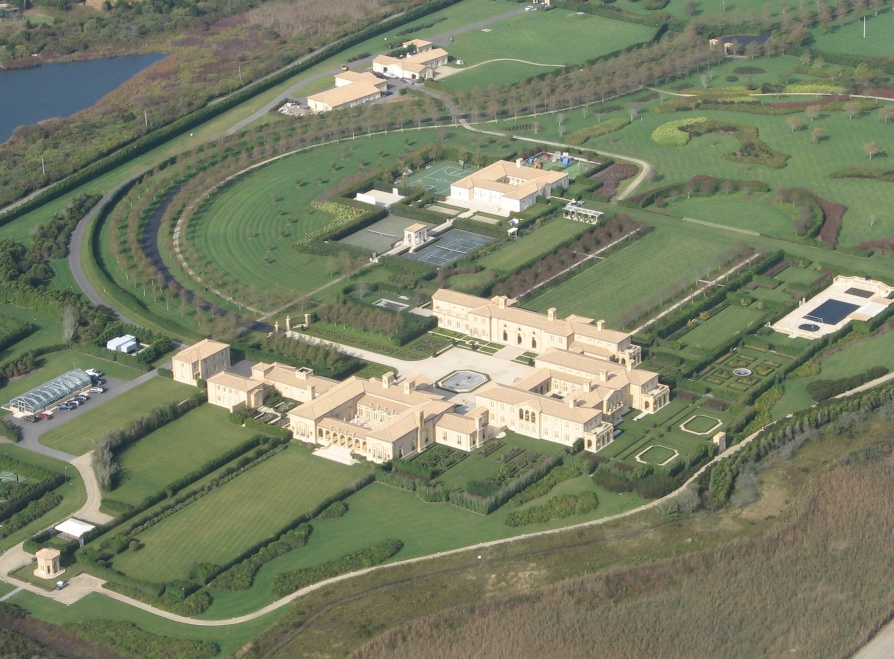
Photograph of Ira Rennert's compound in Sagaponack, New York, as viewed from above

Rennert caused controversy among his neighbors by building a beach front home in Sagaponack, New York, considered one of the largest occupied residential compounds in the United States. The house outraged locals, who claimed Rennert originally planned to use it as a spa, a hotel, or a religious retreat. He denied such allegations, and the local paper later issued an apology. He named his home after the adjoining body of water, Fairfield Pond.

The house faces the Atlantic Ocean and its grounds measure 63 acres (250,000 m^{2}). The buildings, which total over 110,000 square feet (10,000 m^{2}), including the 66,000-square-foot (6,100 m^{2}) main house, have an Italianate facade, 29 bedrooms, and 39 bathrooms. The house has a dozen chimneys and a Mediterranean-style tile roof as well as a 91-foot (28 m) long formal dining room, a basketball court, a bowling alley, two tennis courts, two squash courts, a carousel, a large swimming pool, a large round kiddie pool, and a $150,000 hot tub, surrounded by another pool. Its property taxes in 2007 were $397,559.00. Based on these taxes, the home is valued at $198 million, making it the most valuable home in the US. Rennert also owns a duplex apartment on Manhattan's Park Avenue, and a home in Israel. He previously lived in Atlantic Beach, New York.

== See also ==
- List of investors in Bernard L. Madoff Securities
