= Half Hollow Hills, New York =

Coordinates: 40°47′07″N 73°22′18″W

- Hamlet
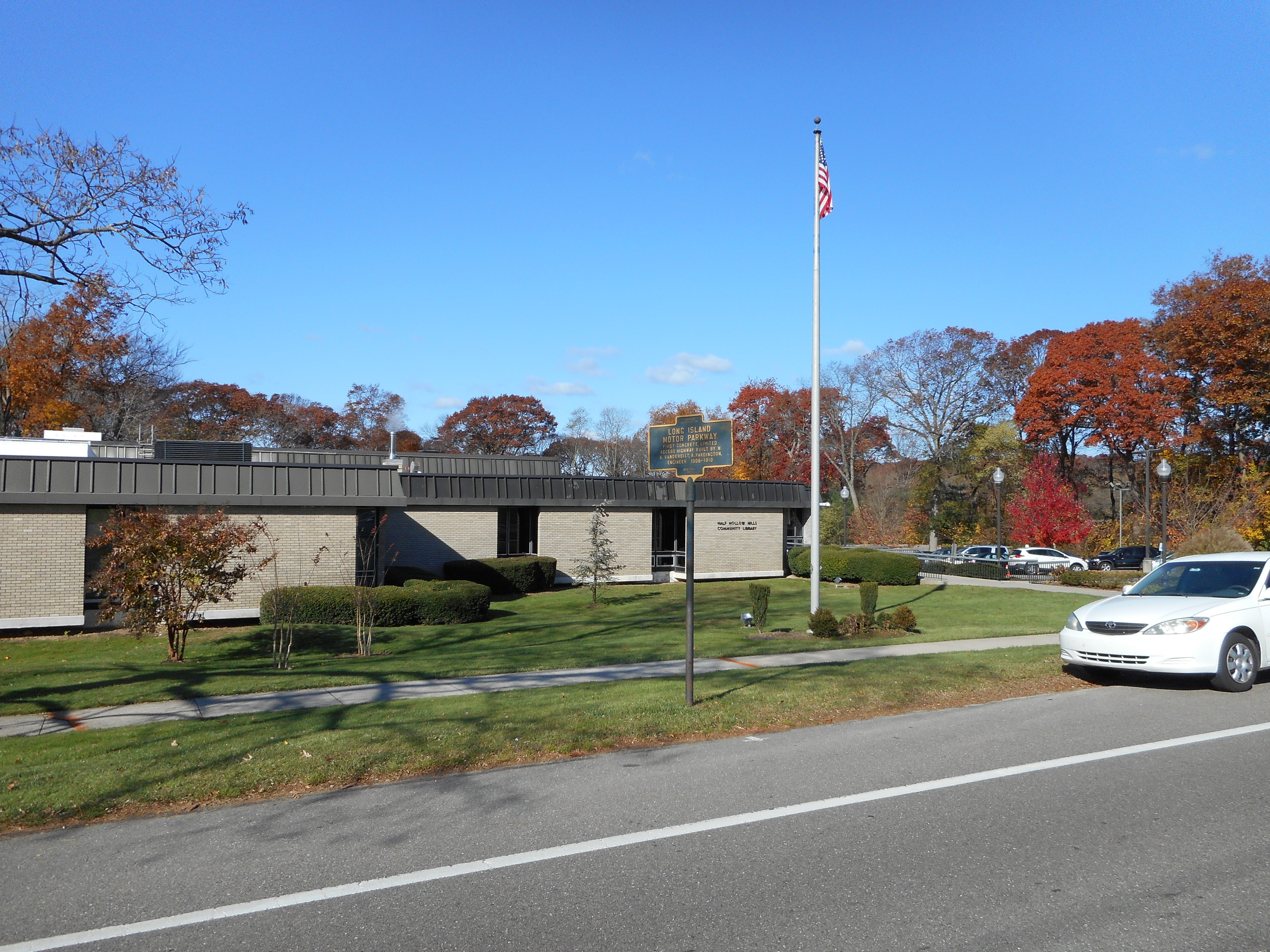
- The Half Hollow Hills Public Library in 2014

- Location on Long Island Location within the State of New York.
- Country: United States
- State: New York
- County: Suffolk
- Town: Babylon; Huntington
- Time zone: UTC−5 (Eastern (EST))
  - Summer (DST): UTC−4 (EDT)
- Area codes: 631, 934

Half Hollow Hills is a large hamlet located within the towns of Babylon and Huntington in Suffolk County, on Long Island, in New York, United States.

Although the area is now frequently associated with portions of Deer Park, Dix Hills, Melville, South Huntington, Wheatley Heights, and Wyandanch, it remains a widely used place-name, which is still used by multiple special taxation districts in the area, including the Half Hollow Hills Central School District and the Half Hollow Hills Community Library District.

There have been multiple proposals made over the years to incorporate the area as the Incorporated Village of Half Hollow Hills.

== History ==
Over the years, multiple attempts to incorporate Half Hollow Hills as a village have been made – most notably in the 1950s and in the early 2000s. The boundaries of the large, proposed village would be coterminous with those of the Half Hollow Hills Central School District's boundaries and those of the Half Hollow Hills Community Library District's.

The reasons frequently cited for the proposals to incorporate are related to planning and zoning laws, as well as home rule. During every major incorporation proposal made – including notable attempts in 1955 and 2003, it had been felt by many in the community that the Towns of Huntington and Babylon were lax in their stances on new developments being constructed in the area, thus allowing the area to become more urbanized.

== Demographics ==
Historical population
Census	Pop.	Note	%±
1960	2,171		—
1970	12,181		461.1%
U.S. Decennial Census

As of the 1970 United States census, the population of the hamlet was 12,181; the totals would be included with those of the Dix Hills CDP's beginning with the 1980 census.

== Education ==
=== School district ===
Half Hollow Hills is located entirely within (and is thus served by) the Half Hollow Hills Central School District.

=== Library district ===
The hamlet is located entirely within (and is thus served by) the Half Hollow Hills Community Library District.

== Transportation ==
The Long Island Motor Parkway passed through the hamlet; portions of this highway survive as a Suffolk County-maintained thoroughfare through the area: County Route 67.

== See also ==
- Dunehampton, New York
- Strathmore, New York
- West Hills, New York
