= Inteva Products =

Global automotive supplier

Inteva Products LLC
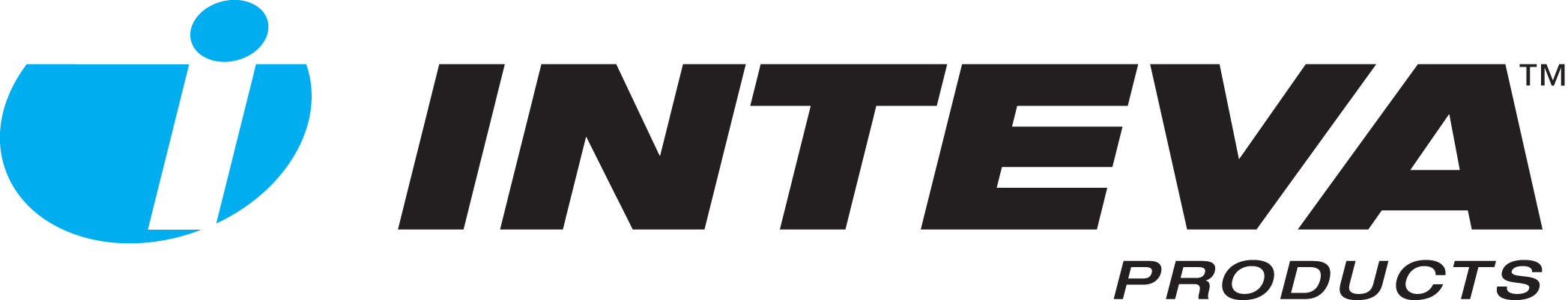
- Type: Limited Liability Company
- Industry: Automotive
- Founded: 2008
- Headquarters: Troy, Michigan, United States
- Key people: Gerard Roose (CEO, President,)
- Products: Vehicle electronics, systems, modules, & components
- Number of employees: 8,000

Inteva Products, LLC (pronounced In-tee-va) is a global automotive supplier. Serving original equipment manufacturers (OEMs) in the automotive industry, Inteva is headquartered in Troy, Michigan and has nearly 30 locations on three continents. The Inteva Products brand name was introduced to the marketplace in 2008 and the company traces its history back to the establishment of German carriage supplier Traugott Golde in 1872.

== History ==
=== 1872–1924 ===
Inteva Products traces its international corporate roots back to the establishment of German carriage supplier Traugott Golde in 1872. However, its brand name was first introduced to the marketplace in 2008. Between 1872 and 1924, four additional automotive suppliers, Inland Manufacturing Company, Fisher Body Company, Guide Lamp and Arvin Heater Company were formed, predecessors to Inteva's four product lines of today.

In 1917, the owners of the Dayton Metal Products Company sought Orville Wright's guidance in their experiments with airplanes, thus creating the Dayton Wright Airplane Company. Over the next five years the company became a General Motors subsidiary and was renamed “Inland,” a name that would suit any of the many products it manufactured. By the end of this era, the Inland Manufacturing Company had replaced all wood materials with rubber and plastic, giving rise to Inteva's long-standing interrelationship with plastics.

Another large supplier, Guide Motor Lamp Manufacturing Company, was formed in Cleveland, Ohio in 1906 to repair carriages and acetylene auto lamps. Two years later, the company produced the first electrical headlamp. Meanwhile, the Fisher Body Company was formed in Detroit in 1908. It found quick success, becoming the world's largest supplier of automotive bodies in the world by 1914. Another native Detroit company, Ternstedt Manufacturing Company, began in 1917 after Alvar K. Ternstedt invented the first practical window regulator. And in 1920, Inteva's last major predecessor the Arvin Heater Company was formed in Indianapolis, after Richard Hood Arvin invented and began producing a new automobile heater.

=== 1924–1946 ===
After Inteva's major predecessors established foundations in the automotive industry, an era of production ensued for the following 20 years. Inteva's European predecessors gave rise to three of its four product lines in this time period. Traugott Golde had begun supplying sunroof components in 1907 but did not begin the production of automotive sunroofs until 1927. The following year, Wilmot Breeden began to produce door latches in Birmingham, England and soon expanded to St. Dié, France, where it became a designer and supplier of door access systems in Europe. These emerging companies were not only the start of Inteva's Roof Systems and Closure Systems but also the start of its global presence. In the 1930s, manufacturing companies found success in producing products in mass quantities. Plastic molding became Inland's most innovative and successful product to date. Due to its durability and variety of colors, the plastic molding material used to produce steering wheels and radio grills was in high demand. During this era the Ternstedt Manufacturing Company had also been consolidated within Fisher Body at GM. By 1940, Inland was producing over 425 products, including the first plastic ice tray.

=== 1946–1975 ===
Regular production of auto parts continued in the United States and innovation became a crucial component to any manufacturing company's success. Fisher Body, which had long since expanded its products beyond solely creating auto bodies, shipped its first latches in 1946. Inland also began selling new products in 1951 when it shipped its first door trim panels and later instrument panels in 1956. The automotive industry in Europe was not far behind the American companies. In 1950, Traugott Golde was renamed Golde GmbH and became the first supplier of sliding sunroofs. The world's first sealed door module was launched in France by the Compagnie Industrielle de Mecanismes SA (CIM) in 1968. Soon, window regulators made the shift from manual to electric operation and CIM became the industry's leader in the investment of electric motors. In 1973, Golde GmbH began the production of the world's first tilt and slide module and in the same year was acquired by Rockwell International, a company with a history in the automotive axle business in Detroit.

=== 1975–2008 ===
Rockwell International's acquisition of Golde GmbH prompted a trend of consolidation that lasted for the next 33 years. Rockwell International continued its acquisition of European suppliers when it purchased both Wilmot Breeden and CIM in 1979, expanding its international footprint and its investment in door module technology. Inteva's three major American predecessors took multiple steps before eventually merging to form a single supplier. In 1984, Guide Lamp and Fisher Body, who had both been divisions of General Motors for almost 60 years, merged their light and hardware activities to create the Fisher Guide Division and shipped its first door module in 1987. In the same year, Inland Manufacturing merged with the seating and interiors activities of Fisher Body to form the Inland Division. Five years after these mergers, the two new divisions consolidated once more to create Inland Fisher Guide. In 1991, General Motors consolidated further by organizing all of its separate parts divisions and creating the Automotive Components Group (ACG). Four years later the group was renamed Delphi Automotive Systems and Inland Fisher Guide section became Delphi Interior and Lighting Systems. In the same year, Rockwell International spun off its automotive business and created Meritor Automotive. In 1999 Delphi Automotive Systems became independent from General Motors and as it began to gain business its different systems became more distinctive. In 2001, Delphi introduced the first full modular door system and in 2002 added cockpit modules to its portfolio. Also in 2002, the company was renamed Delphi Corporation. In 2000, Meritor Automotive merged with Arvin Industries to create ArvinMeritor, Inc. Later in 2007, the company formed its Body Systems business unit, which had combined the former doors business units from Wilmot Breeden and CIM with the sunroofs business of Golde GmbH. In 2008, the Renco Group, Inc. acquired Delphi's global Interiors and Closures businesses from Delphi Corporation and renamed the business Inteva Products, LLC.

=== 2008–Today ===
Inteva established its global headquarters in Troy, Michigan and began operations with 30 global locations. From its start, the company has produced interior and closure systems for several original equipment manufacturers (OEMs) worldwide. In 2011, Inteva acquired the Body Systems unit of ArvinMeritor which expanded its product lines to include roof systems, motors and electronics. Since its foundation in 2008, Inteva has added new sites, reaching a total of 46 locations on 5 continents. It also opened several new technical centers, testing and measurement labs, and design studios to optimize its capabilities. In December 2025, it was announced Inteva had acquired portions of International Automotive Components Group's European business, for an undisclosed amount. IAC supply automotive interior systems and components.

=== Milestones ===
- 2023 – opening of new regional technical center in Queretaro, Queretaro, Mexico
- 2019 – CIE Automotive acquires the Roofs division of Inteva Products
- 2017 – opening of new manufacturing plant in Silao, Guanajuato, Mexico
- 2016 – opening of new manufacturing plant in Oradea, Romania
- 2016 – opening of new manufacturing plant in Zhenjiang, China
- 2016 – opening of new manufacturing plant in Rychnov, Czech Republic
- 2016 – opening of new technical center in Bangalore, India
- 2016 – opening of new corporate office and logistics center in Amsterdam, Netherlands
- 2012 – opening of new manufacturing plant in Pune, India
- 2012 – Expansion of Inteva's Asia-Pacific footprint to Western China with the opening of Roof Systems manufacturing plant in Chengdu
- 2011 – Grand opening of new manufacturing and technical center in Cordeiropolis, Brazil
- 2011 – Acquisition of ArvinMeritor's body systems business, doubling the company's size and presence in Europe, Asia and the Americas
- 2008 – Inteva Products is established from Delphi's Interior & Closure Systems division
- 2005 – Delphi, Inteva's predecessor, develops a powdered form of TPO (Thermoplastic Polyolefin) that can be used in slush molding process
- 1997 – Delphi is first automotive interior supplier to introduce TPO in extruded-sheet form for use in the thermoforming process of instrument panel skins

== Products ==
Inteva's development capabilities include in-house design, rapid prototyping, testing resources and R&D centers on 3 continents. Inteva makes three product lines:

- Closure Systems – Inteva produces door latches, compartment latches, associated strikers and electronic actuators.
- Interior Systems – Inteva's interiors offer components and modules for vehicle interiors from instrument panels, consoles and door trim to cockpits and headliners.
- Motors & Electronics
