= Renco Group =

American holding company

The Renco Group, Inc.
- Type: Private
- Founded: 1975; 51 years ago
- Headquarters: One Rockefeller Plaza, New York, NY, USA
- Key people: Chair, CEO: Ira Rennert; President: Ari Rennert; VP Finance: Roger L. Fay
- Services: Security
- Owner: Ira Rennert
- Subsidiaries: Baron Drawn Steel Corp.; Doe Run Co.; Doe Run Peru S.R.L.; Unarco Material Handling, Inc.; US Magnesium LLC; Inteva Products; AM General (–2020); RG Steel Corp. (defunct)
- Website: rencogroup.net

The Renco Group, Inc. is an American New York City-based holding company controlled by Ira Rennert that invests in other companies across a range of industries.

== History ==
In August 2004, it was announced that Ronald Perelman's MacAndrews & Forbes Holdings company would form a joint venture with AM General's current owner, Renco Group, to give Perelman 70% ownership of AM General. The deal reportedly cost close to US$1 billion. In 2007, Renco Group lost ownership of its bankrupt subsidiary WCI Steel to its lenders. Through subsidiary Inteva Products, LLC, Renco Group purchased Delphi's Global Interiors and Closures businesses in March 2008. In June 2021, Renco Group purchased Renfro Brands, Renfro Brands is a designer, manufacturer, and marketer of socks and legwear products.

In November 2024, the group acquired Coach USA, which had gone in bankruptcy proceedings.

In September 2025, US Magnesium, a Renco Group subsidiary, filed for Chapter 11 bankruptcy protection with more than $200 million in liabilities. In June 2026, a bankruptcy court approved a liquidation plan proposed by the company's unsecured creditors, overruling objections from Renco and Wells Fargo.

== Pollution ==
The Renco Group owns various mills and mines in the United States and South America, and pollution problems at some of the company's properties have sparked public outcries, environmental lawsuits, and hundreds of millions of dollars in environmental penalties and fines. Renco subsidiary, magnesium producer US Magnesium (USM), is accused of polluting the Great Salt Lake in Utah.

Smelting operations by Renco subsidiary Doe Run Company, are responsible for elevated levels of lead, arsenic, and cadmium in Herculaneum, Missouri, and elevated levels of lead, copper, zinc, and sulfur dioxide in La Oroya, Peru. In 2007, La Oroya was listed by Blacksmith Institute as one of the "World's Worst Polluted Places".
