= St. Joe Minerals =

St. Joe Minerals Corporation was an American mining company. It was the United States' largest producer of lead and zinc at the time of its merger with Fluor Corporation in 1981. The St. Joseph Lead Company was founded on March 25, 1864, by Lyman W. Gilbert, John E. Wylie, Edmund I. Wade, Wilmot Williams, James L. Dunham and James L. Hathaway in New York City.

The company acquired a lead mine at Bonne Terre, Missouri. The mine had had numerous problems including Price's Raid by Confederate States Army General Sterling Price. However under first president J. Wyman Jones and new mine manager Charles B. Parsons began using new diamond drilling techniques the business prospered. It nearly went bankrupt February 26, 1883 when a fire destroyed the milling operations. The success of the company prompted many competitors in southeast Missouri including the Doe Run Company and Desloge Consolidated Lead Company which were absorbed by St. Joe. Firmin V. Desloge, patriarch of the Desloge Family in America, remained on the board of directors as well as many of his descendants well into the late 20th Century.

By 1923 the company had 250 miles of underground railroad running under Flat River, Leadwood, Desloge, Rivermines and Elvins, Missouri. In 1925 it expanded operations to lead, zinc and silver mining in South America including the Aguilar mine in Argentina near the Bolivia border.

Its expansion into the zinc operations particularly in the northeastern United States lead it to Northern Ore Company in New York and the New Jersey Zinc Company in New Jersey in 1943. In the 1940s it expanded its Missouri Lead Belt operations to Indian Creek, Viburnum, Meramec Township, and Fletcher.

Its domination of the Southeast Missouri Lead District gave it control of nearly 70 percent of the United States lead production As the company also branched into the coal industry acquiring A.T. Massey in 1974 it was renamed St. Joe Minerals. In 1981 with metal prices running high Fluor Corporation outbid Seagrams to acquire the company. Shortly after the acquisition metal prices collapsed. The Fluor Corporation would spin the components off with zinc going to the Horsehead Corporation in 1987, lead to the Doe Run Company and coal to Massey Energy.

The Bonne Terre Mine and St. Joe Lead Company Administration Building are listed on the National Register of Historic Places.
