= Leadwood, Missouri =

- City
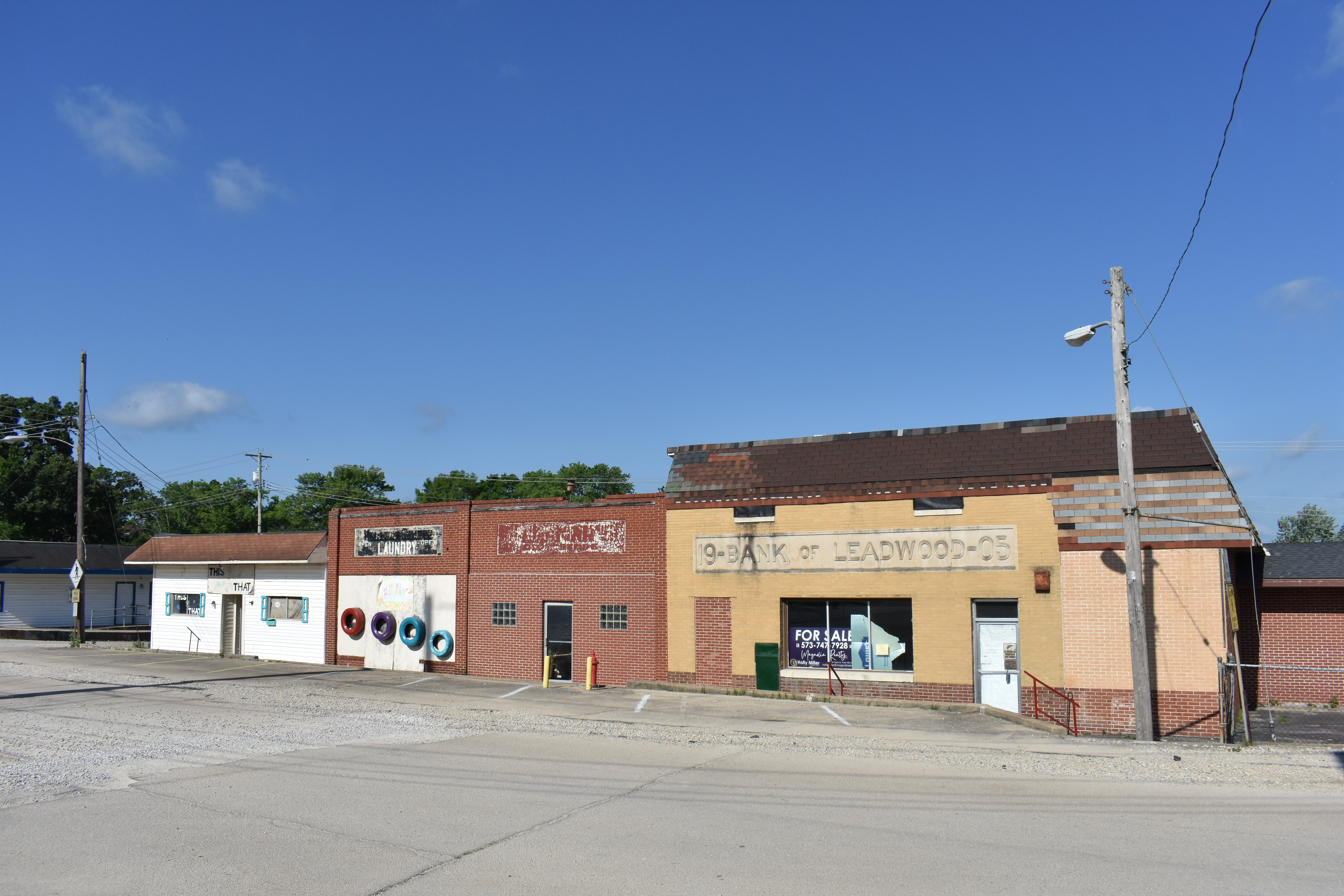
- Leadwood in June 2026

- Location of Leadwood, Missouri
- Coordinates: 37°51′42″N 90°35′21″W
- Country: United States
- State: Missouri
- County: St. Francois
- Incorporated: 1964

Area
  - Total: 1.16 sq mi (3.00 km^{2})
  - Land: 1.16 sq mi (3.00 km^{2})
  - Water: 0 sq mi (0.00 km^{2})
- Elevation: 758 ft (231 m)

Population (2020)
  - Total: 1,178
  - Density: 1,018/sq mi (393.2/km^{2})
- Time zone: UTC-6 (Central (CST))
  - Summer (DST): UTC-5 (CDT)
- Zip code: 63653
- Area code: 573
- FIPS code: 29-41078
- GNIS feature ID: 2395661
- Website: cityofleadwood.com

Leadwood is a city in St. Francois County, Missouri, United States. As of the 2020 census, Leadwood had a population of 1,178.

== History ==
Leadwood was founded in January 1906 as a company town by St. Joe Lead which originally called it Owl Creek. It was situated along the St. Louis, Iron Mountain and Southern Railway. A post office called Leadwood was established in 1905, and remained in operation until 1966.

== Geography ==
According to the United States Census Bureau, the city has a total area of 1.16 square miles (3.00 km^{2}), all land.

== Demographics ==
Historical population
Census	Pop.	Note	%±
1950	1,479		—
1960	1,343		−9.2%
1970	1,397		4.0%
1980	1,371		−1.9%
1990	1,247		−9.0%
2000	1,160		−7.0%
2010	1,282		10.5%
2020	1,178		−8.1%
U.S. Decennial Census

=== 2010 census ===
As of the census of 2010, there were 1,282 people, 456 households, and 353 families living in the city. The population density was 1,105.2 inhabitants per square mile (426.7/km^{2}). There were 530 housing units at an average density of 456.9 per square mile (176.4/km^{2}). The racial makeup of the city was 98.99% White, 0.08% Black or African American, 0.16% Native American, 0.16% Native Hawaiian or Pacific Islander, 0.23% from other races, and 0.39% from two or more races. Hispanic or Latino of any race were 0.86% of the population.

There were 456 households, of which 42.3% had children under the age of 18 living with them, 48.5% were married couples living together, 19.7% had a female householder with no husband present, 9.2% had a male householder with no wife present, and 22.6% were non-families. 18.0% of all households were made up of individuals, and 8.6% had someone living alone who was 65 years of age or older. The average household size was 2.81 and the average family size was 3.13.

The median age in the city was 32.8 years. 28.8% of residents were under the age of 18; 11.9% were between the ages of 18 and 24; 25.6% were from 25 to 44; 23.2% were from 45 to 64; and 10.5% were 65 years of age or older. The gender makeup of the city was 49.6% male and 50.4% female.

=== 2000 census ===
As of the census of 2000, there were 1,160 people, 422 households, and 327 families living in the city. The population density was 1,002.5 inhabitants per square mile (387.1/km^{2}). There were 506 housing units at an average density of 437.3 per square mile (168.8/km^{2}). The racial makeup of the city was 97.76% White, 0.09% African American, 0.86% Native American, and 1.29% from two or more races. Hispanic or Latino of any race were 1.12% of the population.

There were 422 households, out of which 40.5% had children under the age of 18 living with them, 55.0% were married couples living together, 16.6% had a female householder with no husband present, and 22.3% were non-families. 19.9% of all households were made up of individuals, and 10.7% had someone living alone who was 65 years of age or older. The average household size was 2.75 and the average family size was 3.10.

In the city the population was spread out, with 30.7% under the age of 18, 8.2% from 18 to 24, 29.7% from 25 to 44, 19.5% from 45 to 64, and 11.9% who were 65 years of age or older. The median age was 32 years. For every 100 females, there were 93.7 males. For every 100 females age 18 and over, there were 87.9 males.

The median income for a household in the city was $25,391, and the median income for a family was $28,534. Males had a median income of $24,722 versus $16,103 for females. The per capita income for the city was $11,402. About 14.9% of families and 19.6% of the population were below the poverty line, including 28.6% of those under age 18 and 13.6% of those age 65 or over.
