= Leadington, Missouri =

- City
- Leadington in June 2026

- Location of Leadington, Missouri
- Coordinates: 37°50′04″N 90°28′50″W
- Country: United States
- State: Missouri
- County: St. Francois

Area
  - Total: 0.91 sq mi (2.36 km^{2})
  - Land: 0.91 sq mi (2.36 km^{2})
  - Water: 0 sq mi (0.00 km^{2})
- Elevation: 896 ft (273 m)

Population (2020)
  - Total: 764
  - Density: 837.5/sq mi (323.37/km^{2})
- Time zone: UTC-6 (Central (CST))
  - Summer (DST): UTC-5 (CDT)
- FIPS code: 29-41024
- GNIS feature ID: 2395660
- Website: www.leadingtonmo.gov

Leadington is a city in St. Francois County, Missouri, United States. As of the 2020 census, Leadington had a population of 764.

== History ==
Leadington was platted in 1895, soon after lead mining began at the town site. A post office called Leadington was established in 1894, and remained in operation until 1966.

== Geography ==
According to the United States Census Bureau, the city has a total area of 0.90 square miles (2.33 km^{2}), all land. The entirety of the city is within Park Hills borders.

== Demographics ==
Historical population
Census	Pop.	Note	%±
1960	365		—
1970	299		−18.1%
1980	238		−20.4%
1990	201		−15.5%
2000	206		2.5%
2010	422		104.9%
2020	764		81.0%
U.S. Decennial Census

=== 2010 census ===
As of the census of 2010, there were 422 people, 193 households, and 116 families living in the city. The population density was 468.9 inhabitants per square mile (181.0/km^{2}). There were 222 housing units at an average density of 246.7 per square mile (95.3/km^{2}). The racial makeup of the city was 95.73% White, 0.24% Black or African American, 0.24% Native American, 0.71% Asian, 0.47% from other races, and 2.61% from two or more races. Hispanic or Latino of any race were 2.13% of the population.

There were 193 households, of which 29.0% had children under the age of 18 living with them, 37.3% were married couples living together, 16.1% had a female householder with no husband present, 6.7% had a male householder with no wife present, and 39.9% were non-families. 35.2% of all households were made up of individuals, and 14% had someone living alone who was 65 years of age or older. The average household size was 2.19 and the average family size was 2.81.

The median age in the city was 36.8 years. 23.5% of residents were under the age of 18; 8.8% were between the ages of 18 and 24; 27.7% were from 25 to 44; 24.3% were from 45 to 64; and 15.6% were 65 years of age or older. The gender makeup of the city was 49.3% male and 50.7% female.

=== 2000 census ===
As of the census of 2000, there were 206 people, 92 households, and 51 families living in the city. The population density was 302.5 inhabitants per square mile (116.8/km^{2}). There were 101 housing units at an average density of 148.3 per square mile (57.3/km^{2}). The racial makeup of the city was 93.20% White, 4.85% African American and 1.94% Asian. Hispanic or Latino of any race were 0.49% of the population.

There were 92 households, out of which 25.0% had children under the age of 18 living with them, 41.3% were married couples living together, 14.1% had a female householder with no husband present, and 43.5% were non-families. 39.1% of all households were made up of individuals, and 17.4% had someone living alone who was 65 years of age or older. The average household size was 2.24 and the average family size was 2.83.

In the city the population was spread out, with 24.3% under the age of 18, 11.2% from 18 to 24, 23.8% from 25 to 44, 20.4% from 45 to 64, and 20.4% who were 65 years of age or older. The median age was 40 years. For every 100 females there were 104.0 males. For every 100 females age 18 and over, there were 90.2 males.

The median income for a household in the city was $19,722, and the median income for a family was $25,577. Males had a median income of $26,429 versus $30,417 for females. The per capita income for the city was $13,336. About 10.3% of families and 13.9% of the population were below the poverty line, including 12.5% of those under the age of 18 and none of those 65 or over.
