= St. Joe State Park =

State park in Missouri, United States

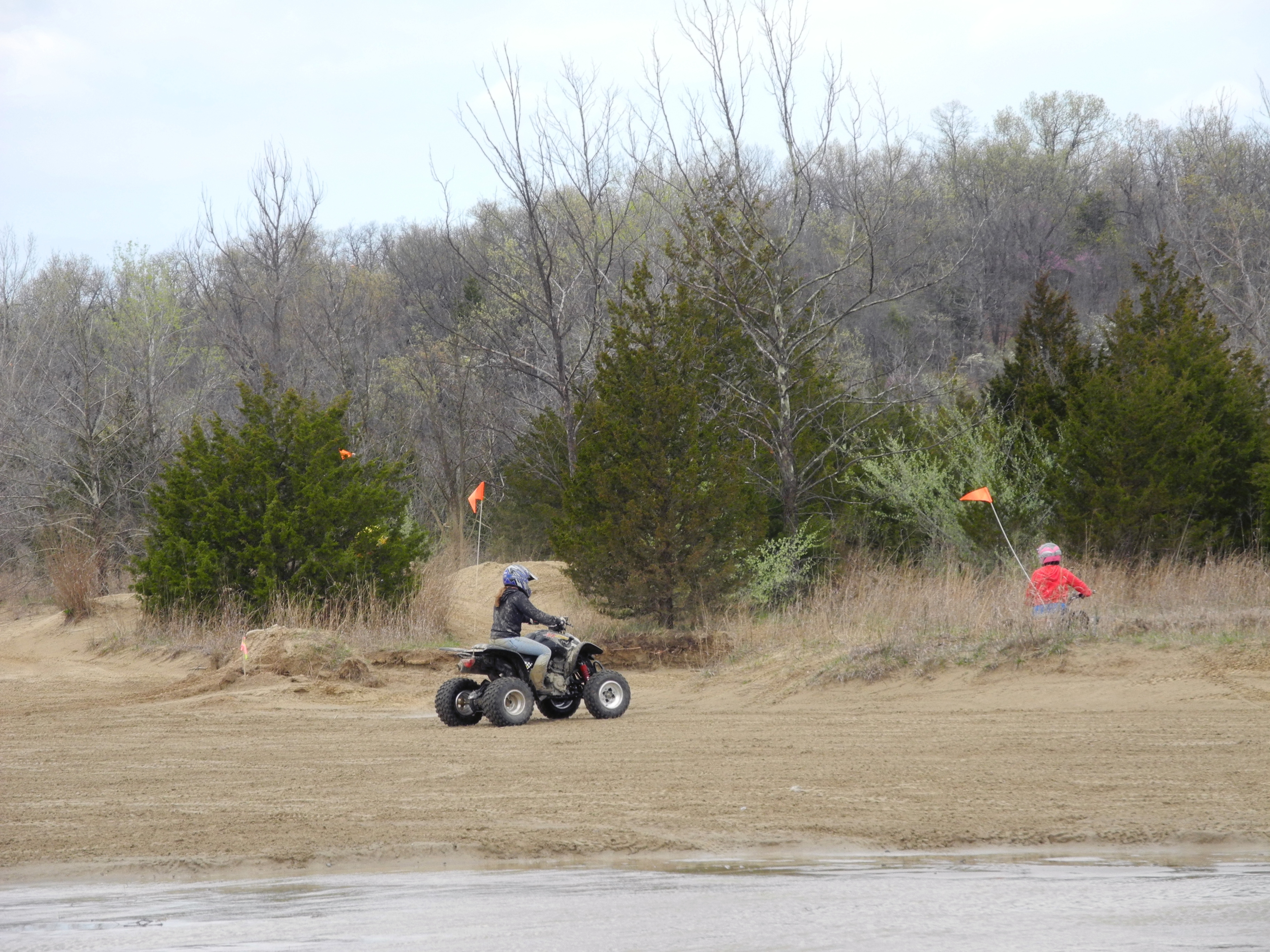
- ORV riders in St. Joe State Park

- Location within Missouri Location within the United States
- Location: Park Hills, Missouri, United States
- Coordinates: 37°48′27″N 90°30′23″W
- Area: 8,242.98 acres (3,335.82 ha)
- Elevation: 928 ft (283 m)
- Established: 1976
- Administrator: Missouri Department of Natural Resources
- Visitors: 871,890 (in 2023)
- Website: Official website

St. Joe State Park is a public recreation area consisting of 8,243 acres (3,336 ha) on the south side of Park Hills, Missouri, along the flanks of the Saint Francois Mountains. The state park includes the Missouri Mines State Historic Site with its former St. Joe Minerals mill buildings and museum of geology and mining. The park features a 2,000-acre (810 ha) off-road vehicle (ORV) riding area located on the old lead mine tailings dumps, camping facilities, and trails for hiking, bicycling, and horseback riding.

== See also ==
- Finger Lakes State Park: another Missouri state park on reclaimed mines.
