= Eugene Field School (Park Hills, Missouri) =

- U.S. National Register of Historic Places
- Location within Missouri Location within the United States
- Location: 403 Glendale St., Park Hills, Missouri
- Coordinates: 37°51′18″N 90°31′9″W
- Area: 2 acres (0.81 ha)
- Built: 1907, 1911
- Architectural style: Late Victorian, Eight Room School
- NRHP reference No.: 05000997
- Added to NRHP: September 6, 2005

Eugene Field School is a historic school building located at Park Hills, St. Francois County, Missouri. It was built in 1907, and is a two-story, "T"-plan, Late Victorian style red brick school building with an addition completed by 1911. It has a low-pitched hipped roof and sits on a raised concrete foundation. It features arched openings and polychromatic brick detailing.

It was added to the National Register of Historic Places in 2005.
