= Boss, Missouri =

- Unincorporated community
- Location within Missouri
- Coordinates: 37°38′35″N 91°11′21″W
- Country: United States
- State: Missouri
- County: Dent
- Elevation: 1,122 ft (342 m)
- Time zone: UTC-6 (Central (CST))
  - Summer (DST): UTC-5 (CDT)
- Area code: 573
- GNIS feature ID: 748967

Boss is an unincorporated rural hamlet in eastern Dent County, Missouri. It is approximately 18 miles east of Salem along Route 32.

The community is named after the nickname of Marion "Boss" Nelson, a lumberman supervisor. A post office at Boss has been in operation since 1901. There is also a residential hotel.
