= Park Hills, Missouri =

- City
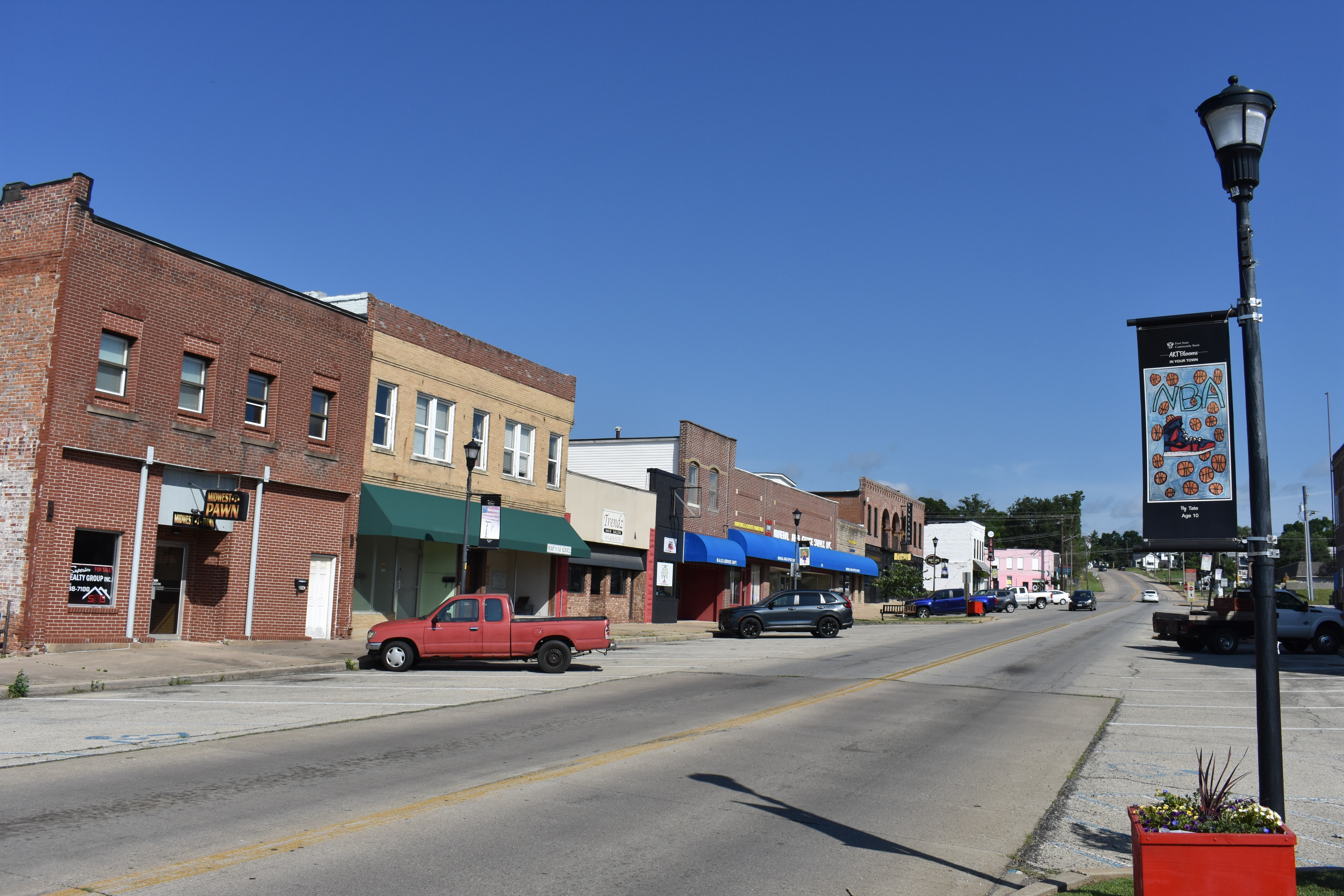
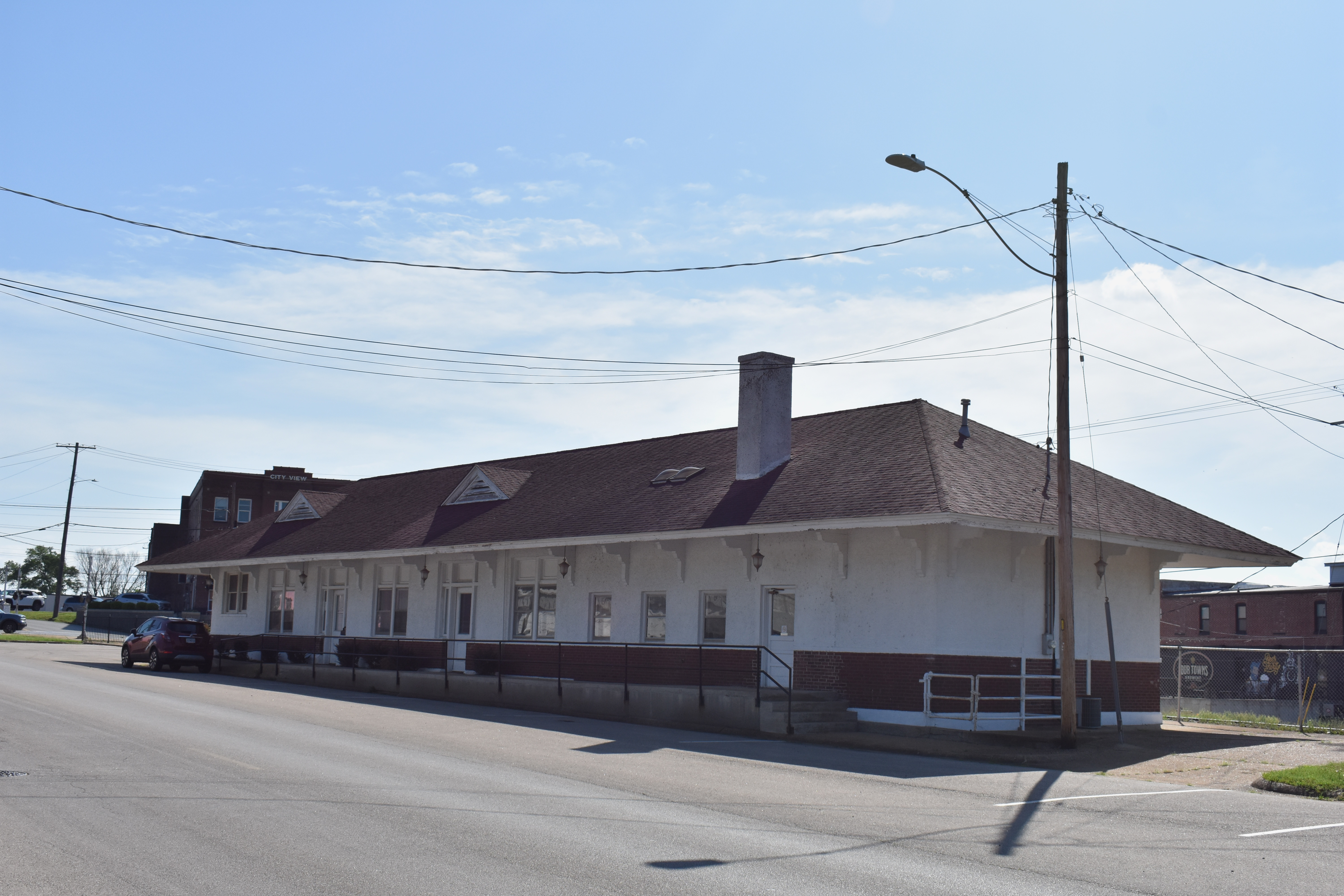
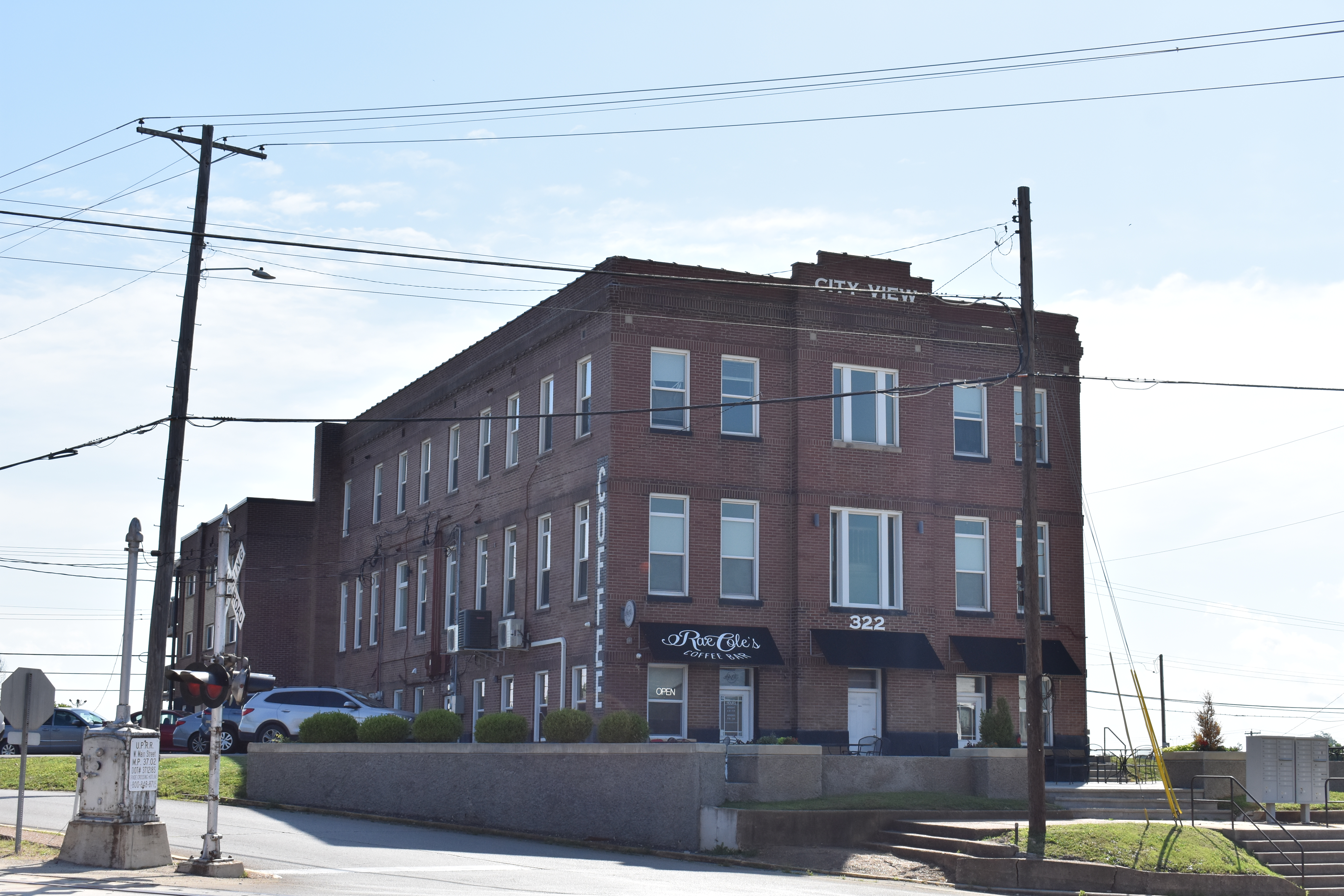
- Main Street Railway Depot City View Building

- Location of Park Hills, Missouri
- Coordinates: 37°50′40″N 90°30′40″W
- Country: United States
- State: Missouri
- County: St. Francois

Area
  - Total: 20.43 sq mi (52.91 km^{2})
  - Land: 20.34 sq mi (52.67 km^{2})
  - Water: 0.089 sq mi (0.23 km^{2})
- Elevation: 758 ft (231 m)

Population (2020)
  - Total: 8,587
  - Density: 422.2/sq mi (163.03/km^{2})
- Time zone: UTC-6 (Central (CST))
  - Summer (DST): UTC-5 (CDT)
- Zip code: 63601
- Area code: 573
- FIPS code: 29-56272
- GNIS feature ID: 1669609
- Website: http://www.parkhillsmo.net/

Park Hills is a city in St. Francois County, Missouri, United States. The population was 8,587 at the 2020 census.

== History ==
The city was formed in an unusual four-way merger that took place in January 1994, in which the cities of Flat River, Elvins, Esther and the village of Rivermines joined to form the new city of Park Hills. The formerly incorporated village of Fairview Acres had previously merged with Flat River on November 8, 1983. The name of the new city was selected by entries submitted to a committee made up of citizens of the four cities. The name Park Hills was submitted by Mildred Lee, a lifelong resident and a former teacher of Flat River. The inspiration came from its hilly terrain in the foothills of the Ozark Mountains and the many parks that surround the area. Park Hills is located 7 miles northwest of Farmington, Missouri and approximately 65 miles south of St. Louis. It is adjacent to St. Joe State Park, and nearby the state parks of St. Francois, Hawn, Elephant Rocks, Johnson's Shut-Ins, Taum Sauk Mountain, and Washington.

Park Hills is home to Mineral Area College, formerly known as Flat River Junior College. The town is located in the Old Lead Belt, formerly a large lead mining district.

The Eugene Field School was added to the National Register of Historic Places in 2005.

== Geography ==
Park Hills is located at 37°50′40″N 90°30′40″W (37.844538, -90.511038).

According to the United States Census Bureau, the city has a total area of 20.42 square miles (52.89 km^{2}), of which 20.33 square miles (52.65 km^{2}) is land and 0.09 square miles (0.23 km^{2}) is water.

== Demographics ==
Park Hills Historical population
Census	Pop.	Note	%±
2000	7,861		—
2010	8,759		11.4%
2020	8,587		−2.0%
U.S. Decennial Census 2020

Fairview Acres Historical population
Census	Pop.	Note	%±
1960	32		—
1970	43		34.4%
1980	31		−27.9%
Missouri Census Data Center

=== 2020 census ===
As of the 2020 census, Park Hills had a population of 8,587. The median age was 34.2 years. 24.9% of residents were under the age of 18 and 12.3% were 65 years of age or older. For every 100 females there were 98.1 males, and for every 100 females age 18 and over there were 94.6 males age 18 and over.

95.4% of residents lived in urban areas, while 4.6% lived in rural areas.

There were 3,362 households and 2,155 families in Park Hills. Of households, 33.2% had children under the age of 18 living in them. Of all households, 37.3% were married-couple households, 20.4% were households with a male householder and no spouse or partner present, and 30.7% were households with a female householder and no spouse or partner present. About 32.4% of all households were made up of individuals and 11.5% had someone living alone who was 65 years of age or older. The average household size was 2.5 and the average family size was 3.0.

There were 3,783 housing units, of which 11.1% were vacant. The homeowner vacancy rate was 4.7% and the rental vacancy rate was 9.2%.

Racial composition as of the 2020 census
Race	Number	Percent
White	7,774	90.5%
Black or African American	163	1.9%
American Indian and Alaska Native	42	0.5%
Asian	23	0.3%
Native Hawaiian and Other Pacific Islander	4	0.0%
Some other race	120	1.4%
Two or more races	461	5.4%
Hispanic or Latino (of any race)	156	1.8%

=== Income and poverty ===
The 2016–2020 5-year American Community Survey estimates show that the median household income was $38,065 (with a margin of error of +/- $7,153) and the median family income was $42,817 (+/- $4,987). Males had a median income of $32,167 (+/- $3,224) versus $21,697 (+/- $2,183) for females. The median income for those above 16 years old was $26,788 (+/- $4,293). Approximately, 23.0% of families and 24.4% of the population were below the poverty line, including 30.1% of those under the age of 18 and 14.2% of those ages 65 or over.

=== 2010 census ===
At the 2010 census there were 8,759 people, 3,551 households, and 2,154 families living in the city. The population density was 430.8 inhabitants per square mile (166.3/km^{2}). There were 3,943 housing units at an average density of 193.9 per square mile (74.9/km^{2}). The racial makeup of the city was 95.34% White, 1.96% Black or African American, 0.47% Native American, 0.41% Asian, 0.13% Native Hawaiian or Pacific Islander, 0.25% from other races, and 1.44% from two or more races. Hispanic or Latino of any race were 1.27%.

Of the 3,551 households 35.3% had children under the age of 18 living with them, 38.7% were married couples living together, 15.8% had a female householder with no husband present, 6.1% had a male householder with no wife present, and 39.3% were non-families. 31.1% of households were one person and 11% were one person aged 65 or older. The average household size was 2.44 and the average family size was 3.04.

The median age was 32.7 years. 26.2% of residents were under the age of 18; 12.1% were between the ages of 18 and 24; 26.8% were from 25 to 44; 23.2% were from 45 to 64; and 11.7% were 65 or older. The gender makeup of the city was 48.4% male and 51.6% female.

=== 2000 census ===
At the 2000 census there were 7,861 people, 3,181 households, and 2,070 families living in the city. The population density was 392.5 inhabitants per square mile (151.5/km^{2}). There were 3,520 housing units at an average density of 175.7 per square mile (67.8/km^{2}). The racial makeup of the city was 97.62% White, 0.32% African American, 0.27% Native American, 0.45% Asian, 0.03% Pacific Islander, 0.41% from other races, and 0.92% from two or more races. Hispanic or Latino of any race were 0.92%.

Of the 3,181 households 32.3% had children under the age of 18 living with them, 45.5% were married couples living together, 15.3% had a female householder with no husband present, and 34.9% were non-families. 28.7% of households were one person and 12.5% were one person aged 65 or older. The average household size was 2.45 and the average family size was 2.99.

The age distribution was 26.6% under the age of 18, 11.2% from 18 to 24, 29.1% from 25 to 44, 19.6% from 45 to 64, and 13.5% 65 or older. The median age was 34 years. For every 100 females there were 89.6 males. For every 100 females age 18 and over, there were 85.0 males.

The median household income was $25,277 and the median family income was $30,663. Males had a median income of $26,900 versus $17,613 for females. The per capita income for the city was $13,048. About 17.6% of families and 21.1% of the population were below the poverty line, including 28.8% of those under age 18 and 12.2% of those age 65 or over.

== Education ==
Public education in Park Hills is administered by Central R-III School District.

Park Hills has a lending library, the Park Hills Public Library.

== Arts and culture ==
Some of the many places that bring people to Park Hills Missouri include Columbia Park located in the center of the city and includes a walking track, playground, an 18-hole disc golf course, and the Park Hills public pool, Park Hills Sports Complex which is home to many softball games; opening in March and closing in November.

== Entertainment and Annual Events ==
=== Cruisin' for a Cause ===
An event tied to Flat River's past of cruising around downtown listening to the radio and having a good time, this event helps raise money for the Meals on Wheels program. Sponsored by the Park Hills Senior Center.

=== Summer Movies at the Park ===
In partnership with the City of Desloge (Desloge, Missouri) and City of Bonne Terre (Bonne Terre, Missouri) and hosted by American Family Insurance - Hanna Mahoney, a free movie is shown at Columbia Park. Two others movies are shown in parks within the two other participating cities.

=== Sauces & Shows ===
With its inaugural kickoff in 2022, this two-day festival is hosted in collaboration with the Downtown Park Hills Association and Park Hills - Leadington Chamber of Commerce and presents several events matching the year's theme. Musical performances, vendors, food trucks, and more make up the core attractions of the festival.

=== Scarecrow Contest ===
Hosted by the Downtown Park Hills Association, businesses, organizations, and residents enter to create scarecrows that are displayed on West Main Street. Awards are given out based on community votes through the Downtown Park Hills Association's Facebook page.

=== Trunk N' Treat ===
Taking place on Halloween, this family friendly event sponsored by the Downtown Park Hills Association, local businesses and organizations fill up West Main Street with tables and decorated cars to provide children with sweets from safe and trusted community members.

=== Annual Community Christmas Parade ===
Hosted by the Park Hills - Leadington Chamber of Commerce, the annual parade kicks off the city's holiday festivities. The parade starts on St. Francois Street and follows West Main Street to Rinke.

The Park Hills Chamber of Commerce also independently hosts several events throughout the year. Listings for these events are available at https://business.phlcoc.net/events

== Notable people ==
- Darrell S. Cole, Medal of Honor recipient and namesake of USS Cole (DDG-67)
- Ferlin Husky, country music singer, member of the Country Music Hall of Fame
- Bill Upton, Major League Baseball player
- Tom Upton, Major League Baseball player
