= Adair Creek =

Stream in Missouri, U.S.

- Location of Adair Creek mouth

Location
- Country: United States
- State: Missouri
- County: Reynolds

Physical characteristics
- Source: Jayhawker Hollow divide
  - location: about 5 miles southeast of Bunker, Missouri
  - coordinates: 37°25′00″N 91°09′44″W
  - elevation: 1,260 ft (380 m)
- Mouth: Logan Creek
  - location: about 3 miles southwest of Corridon, Missouri
  - coordinates: 37°21′26″N 91°07′19″W
  - elevation: 955 ft (291 m)
- Length: 5.74 mi (9.24 km)
- Basin size: 7.44 square miles (19.3 km^{2})
- Discharge
  - location: Logan Creek
  - average: 10.11 cu ft/s (0.286 m^{3}/s) at mouth with Logan Creek

Basin features
- Progression: Logan Creek → Black River → White River → Mississippi River → Gulf of Mexico
- River system: Black River
- Tributaries
  - left: unnamed tributaries
  - right: unnamed tributaries
- Bridges: Unnamed Road, Highway B

Adair Creek is a stream in western Reynolds County in the Ozarks of southeast Missouri. It is a tributary of Logan Creek.

The source area lies just south of the junction of Missouri Route 72 and Missouri Route P about three miles southeast of Bunker. The stream flows south to southeast to its confluence with Logan Creek along Missouri Route B about 3.5 miles southwest of Reynolds. About one mile upstream from its confluence the stream has been blocked with a dam and filled by mine tailings from the Adair Creek Mine (Sweetwater Mine).

Adair Creek has the name of one Mr. Adair, a local judge.

== Course ==
Adair Creek rises about 5 miles southeast of Bunker, Missouri, in Reynolds County and then flows generally southeast to join Logan Creek about 3 miles southwest of Corridon.

== Watershed ==
Adair Creek drains 7.44 square miles (19.3 km^{2}) of area, receives about 46.1 in/year of precipitation, has a wetness index of 404.02, and is about 77% forested.

== See also ==
- List of rivers of Missouri
