= Toms =

Toms, Tom's or TOMS may refer to:

== People ==
- Billy Toms (1895–unknown), Irish footballer
- Carl Toms (1927–1999), British set and costume designer
- David Toms (born 1967), American golfer on the PGA tour
- Edward Toms (1899–1971), British athlete
- Elaine Toms (disambiguation), multiple people

- Elaine G. Toms, Canadian and British information scientist
- M. Elaine Toms (1917–2019), Korean-born American physicist

- Eric Toms (born 1979), American comedian
- Frederick Toms (1885–1965), Canadian rower
- Ivan Toms (1953–2008), South African physician and political activist
- Jeff Toms (born 1974), Canadian ice hockey player
- Kevin Toms, computer game designer
- Peter Toms (painter) (c. 1728-1777), English portrait and drapery painter
- Samuel Toms (c. 1842–1907), founder of Good, Toms & Co, South Australian wholesaler
- Wendy Toms (born 1962), English football referee
- William Henry Toms (c. 1700–1765), English engraver
- Toms Hartmanis (born 1987), Latvian ice hockey player
- Toms Leimanis (born 1994), Latvian basketball player
- Toms (cartoonist) (1929–2016), Indian cartoonist V. T. Thomas

== Geography ==
- Toms River, New Jersey, United States, an estuary
- Toms Lake, Michigan, United States

== Businesses ==
- TOM'S, Tachi Oiwa Motor Sport, a Japanese racing team and engine tuner
- Tom's Hardware, an online publication focused on technology
- Tom's Ice Cream Bowl, an ice cream parlor in Zanesville, Ohio, United States
- Toms International, a European confectionery maker
- Tom's Kitchen, a restaurant in Chelsea, England
- Tom's of Maine, a manufacturer of personal care products
- Tom's Restaurant, Manhattan, New York, United States
- TOMS Shoes, a manufacturer of shoes and glasses
- Tom's Snacks Co., a manufacturer of snack foods

== Other uses ==
- Total Ozone Mapping Spectrometer (TOMS)
- ACM Transactions on Mathematical Software
- Short name for tom drum

== See also ==
- Tom (disambiguation)
- Toms River (disambiguation)
