= Imboden Fork =

Stream in the U.S. state of Missouri

Imboden Fork or Imboden Creek is a stream in Iron and Reynolds counties of southeast Missouri. It is a tributary of the East Fork Black River.

The Imboden Fork headwaters arise in Iron County at 37°38′58″N 90°46′23″W at an elevation of about 1,340 ft (410 m) and the confluence with the East Fork in Reynolds County is at 37°33′17″N 90°50′40″W at an elevation of 833 ft (254 m). The source area lies within the Mark Twain National Forest about three miles southwest of Belleview. The stream flows to the southwest and is followed by Missouri Route O through the forest. At its junction with Shut-in Creek the stream turns south and flows along Missouri Route MM past the community of Monterey and on to its confluence with the East Fork just north of Johnson's Shut-Ins State Park.

The stream was named for an early settler to the area.
