= Bee Fork =

Bee Fork may refer to:

- Bee Fork, Missouri, an unincorporated community
- Bee Fork (Mill Creek tributary), a stream in Missouri
- Bee Fork (West Fork Black River tributary), a stream in Missouri
