= Oates, Missouri =

Unincorporated community in the US state of Missouri

Coordinates: 37°33′46″N 91°03′23″W

Oates is an unincorporated community in northern Reynolds County, in the U.S. state of Missouri. The community is located on Brushy Creek at the intersection of Missouri Route J and county road 836. Nearby communities include Black, approximately seven miles to the east-southeast on the Middle Fork of the Black River and Buick, about six miles to the northwest in Iron County.

== History ==
A post office called Oates was established in 1887, and remained in operation until 1920. The namesake of Oates is unknown.
