= Logan Creek (Black River tributary) =

Stream in Missouri, USA

Logan Creek Tributary to Black River
- Location of Logan Creek mouth Logan Creek (Black River tributary) (the United States)

Location
- Country: United States
- State: Missouri
- County: Reynolds
- City: Ellington

Physical characteristics
- Source: divide of tributary of Logan Creek
  - location: about 2 miles southwest of Number 46 Lake
  - coordinates: 37°24′30.17″N 091°08′29.46″W
  - elevation: 1,220 ft (370 m)
- Mouth: Black River
  - location: about 5 miles west of Piedmont, Missouri
  - coordinates: 37°18′33.18″N 090°46′57.44″W
  - elevation: 495 ft (151 m)
- Length: 44.1 mi (71.0 km)
- Basin size: 264.16 square miles (684.2 km^{2})
- Discharge
  - location: Black River
  - average: 374.26 cu ft/s (10.598 m^{3}/s) at mouth with Black River

Basin features
- Progression: Black River → White River → Mississippi River → Gulf of Mexico
- River system: Black River
- Tributaries
  - left: Adair Creek; Sweetwater Creek; Suses Branch; Webb Creek
  - right: Willie Branch
- Bridges: County Road 737, Highway B (x2), County Road 761, County Road 776, County Road 779, County Road 780, County Road 782, Highway B, Highway F, MO 21, County Road 422

Logan Creek is a stream in western Reynolds County in the Ozarks of southeast Missouri. It is a tributary of the Black River.

The source area of the stream lies just south of Missouri Route 72 northwest of Reynolds. The stream flows south parallel to Missouri Route B and then turns east near the community of Exchange and flows parallel to Missouri Route 106 past northeast Ellington. East of Ellington the stream turns southeast and enters Clearwater Lake and its confluence with the Black River.

Logan Creek has the name of James Logan, a pioneer citizen.

== Tornado ==
On 8 May 2009, a derecho-embedded tornado went through the Logan Creek Conservation Area.

From John Kabrick, one of the people in the area when it happened, "There was a short time when I had no idea that we would actually get through it. It just seemed like a matter of time before trees would fall on us."

The damage can be seen from satellite.

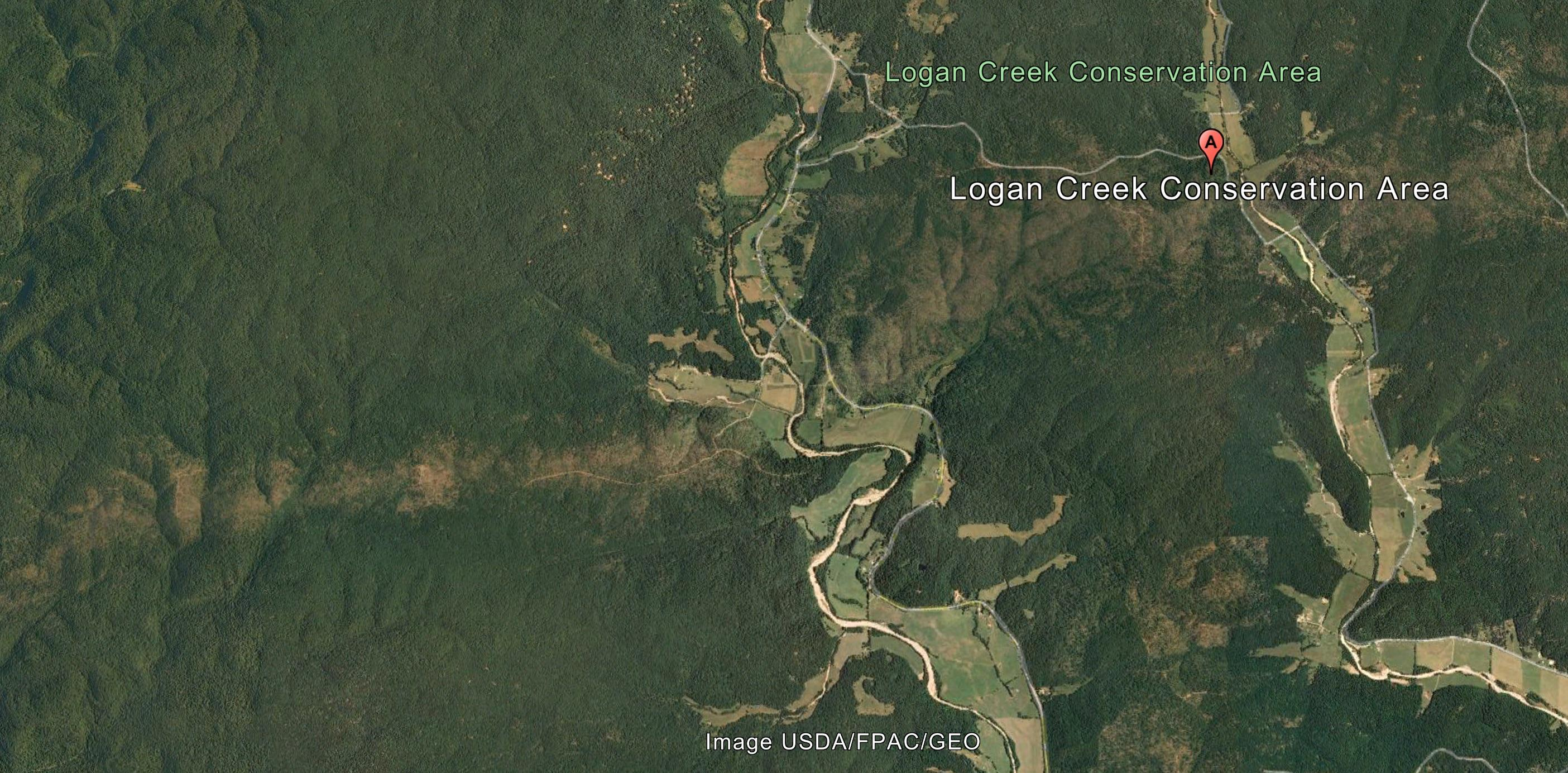
Satellite view of the damage of the 2009 Logan Creek, MO EFU Tornado

The tornado killed zero people and injured three.

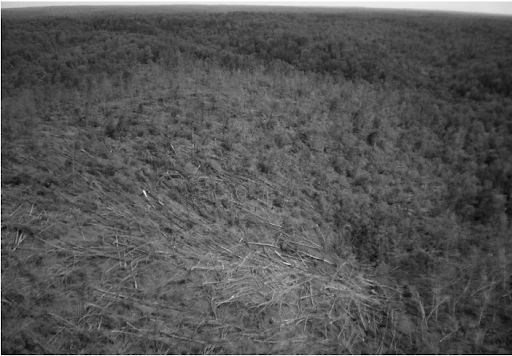
An aerial, black-and-white picture of the tornado damage from the Logan Creek, MO EFU.

== See also ==
- List of rivers of Missouri
