= Dagonia, Missouri =

Unincorporated community in the US state of Missouri

Coordinates: 37°18′44″N 91°07′20″W

Dagonia was an unincorporated community in western Reynolds County, in the U.S. state of Missouri. The community was on the east bank of Logan Creek along Missouri Route B. Reynolds is about seven miles (11 km) to the north along Route B and Ellington lies approximately nine miles (14 km) to the southeast.

== History ==
A post office called Dagonia was established in 1897, and remained in operation until 1917. The community has the name of the local Dagonia family.
