= Strother Creek =

Stream in the U.S. state of Missouri

Strother Creek is a stream in southwest Iron and northern Reynolds counties in the U.S. state of Missouri. It is a tributary to the Middle Fork of the Black River.

The stream headwaters arise in southwestern Iron County just south of Buick and the Buick Mine and east of Missouri Route KK. The stream flows south for about one-half mile then turns to the east to flow adjacent to the Iron-Reynolds county line and crossing the county line a number of times. The stream reaches its confluence with the Middle Fork Black River just south of the county line and west of Missouri Route 49 and about two miles northwest of Edgehill. The upper portion of the stream contains several tailings pond areas from the mines near its source.

The source area is at 37°35′51″N 91°07′54″W and the confluence is at 37°36′07″N 90°57′27″W. The confluence is at an elevation of 843 ft (257 m).

Strother Creek has the name of the local Strother family.

== See also ==
- List of rivers of Missouri
