= Bills Creek (West Fork Black River tributary) =

River in the United States of America

Coordinates: 37°29′52″N 91°08′24″W

Bills Creek is a stream in Iron and Reynolds counties in the U.S. state of Missouri. It is a tributary of the West Fork of the Black River and is located in the Mark Twain National Forest.

The stream headwaters arise in southwest Iron County approximately one mile southwest of Buick at at an elevation of approximately 1350 feet. The stream flows generally to the southwest into Reynolds County and continues on to the south for approximately seven miles to its confluence with the West Fork about 1.5 miles west of the community of West Fork. The confluence is at at an elevation of 942 feet.

Bills Creek has the name of Bill Messer, a pioneer citizen.

== See also ==
- List of rivers of Missouri
