= Bills Creek =

Bills Creek may refer to:

- Bills Creek (Current River tributary), a stream in Missouri
- Bills Creek (West Fork Black River tributary), a stream in Missouri
- Bills Creek (Sugar Creek), a stream in West Virginia
