= Toms Creek (Missouri) =

Stream in the US state of Missouri

Toms Creek is a stream in Reynolds County in the U.S. state of Missouri. It is a tributary of the West Fork Black River.

== Coordinates ==
The stream's headwaters arise just east of Bunker at 37°27′04″N 91°12′03″W and an elevation of approximately 1300 feet. It flows generally north for approximately two miles then turns to the east-northeast for about four miles to its confluence with the West Fork just north of the community of West Fork at 37°29′37″N 91°06′35″W at an elevation of 912 feet.

Toms Creek is named for Thomas Sutterfield, an early settler.

== See also ==
- List of rivers of Missouri
