= Ohlman, Missouri =

Unincorporated community in the US state of Missouri

Coordinates: 37°25′35″N 91°06′55″W

Ohlman is an unincorporated community in western Reynolds County, in the U.S. state of Missouri. The community is located at the intersection of Missouri routes 72 and TT approximately five miles southeast of Bunker and 2.5 miles northwest of Reynolds.

== History ==
A post office called Ohlman was established in 1907, and remained in operation until 1915. The community has the name of James Ohlman, original owner of the site.
