= Redford, Missouri =

Unincorporated community in Missouri, U.S.

Coordinates: 37°19′12″N 90°53′54″W

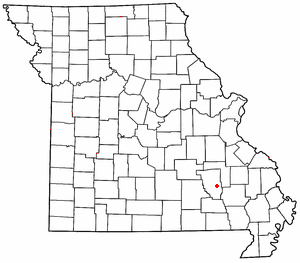

Redford is an unincorporated community in Reynolds County, Missouri, United States. It is located on Misssour Route O approximately eight miles south-southeast of Centerville. Ellington is six miles to the southwest. Sinkin Creek flows past the southwest side of the community.

A post office called Redford has been in operation since 1890. The community has the name of B. Redford, the original owner of the site.

Redford was in the path of the 1925 Tri-State Tornado.
