= Shut =

Shut may refer to:

- Yana Shut (born 1997), Belarusian snooker and pool player.
- Shut (1988 film), directed by Andrei Andreyevich Eshpai.
- Shut (2009 film), starring Lee Baxter.
- Shut or šwt, "shadow", an Ancient Egyptian concept of the soul or spirit.

== See also ==
- Shutdown (disambiguation)
- Shut-in (disambiguation)
- Shut Out (disambiguation)
- Shut up (disambiguation)
