= Black, Missouri =

Unincorporated community in Missouri, U.S.

Coordinates: 37°31′53″N 90°55′59″W

Black is an unincorporated community in northern Reynolds County, Missouri, United States. It is located on Route 49 on the Middle Fork of the Black River, approximately six miles north-northeast of Centerville and southwest of Johnson's Shut-Ins State Park.

== History ==
A post office called Black has been in operation since 1883. The community has the name of George Black, an early settler.

The Buford–Carty Farmstead was listed on the National Register of Historic Places in 2004.

== Education ==
Lesterville R-IV School District operates the Lesterville Ranch Campus at Black.

Black has a public library, a branch of the Reynolds County Library District.
