= Bee Fork (West Fork Black River tributary) =

Stream in the USS state of Missouri

Coordinates: 37°27′36″N 90°59′07″W

Bee Fork is a stream in Reynolds County in the U.S. state of Missouri. It is a tributary of the West Fork Black River.

The stream headwaters arise just southeast of Bunker adjacent to Missouri Route 72 at and it flows east for approximately ten miles to its confluence with West Fork approximately two miles northwest of Centerville at .

Bee Fork was so named due to the presence of honeybees in the area.

== See also ==
- List of rivers of Missouri
