= Shut-in =

Shut-in may refer to:

== People ==
- A shut-in is a person confined indoors, especially as a result of physical or mental disability
  - Agoraphobe
  - Recluse
  - Invalid, or patient
  - Hikikomori, a Japanese term for reclusive adolescents or adults who withdraw from social life

== Geography ==
- Shut-in (river), a river that's naturally confined within a deep, narrow channel
- Shut-in Creek, a creek in Missouri, US

== Film ==
- Intruders (2015 film), a thriller starring Beth Riesgraf, also known as Shut In
- Shut In (2016 film), a thriller starring Naomi Watts
- Shut In (2022 film), a thriller starring Rainey Qualley, Josh Horowitz, and Vincent Gallo

== Other uses ==
- Shut-in (oil drilling), the implementation of a production cap lower than the available output at a particular site
- "The Shut-In!", an episode of Amphibia

== See also ==
- Shut (disambiguation)
- In (disambiguation)
