= Exchange, Missouri =

Unincorporated community in the US state of Missouri

Coordinates: 37°13′34″N 91°02′11″W

Exchange is an unincorporated community in southwest Reynolds County, in the Ozarks of southeast Missouri. The community is located along Missouri Route 106, approximately 3.5 miles west of Ellington. The community sits on the floodplain of Logan Creek.

== History ==
A post office called Exchange was established in 1887, and remained in operation until 1918. The community was so named for the fact commodities were exchanged there.
