= Cornwall, Missouri =

Unincorporated community in Missouri, US

Coordinates: 37°30′44″N 90°12′10″W

Cornwall is an unincorporated community in eastern Madison County, in the U.S. state of Missouri.

The community is on Missouri Route F above Henderson Creek. Henderson is approximately five miles to the northwest and Marquand is six miles to the southeast.

== History ==
Cornwall was platted in 1889 when the railroad was extended to that point. A post office called Cornwall was established in 1870, and remained in operation until 1955.
