= Greeley, Missouri =

Unincorporated community in Missouri, U.S.

Greeley is an unincorporated community in northwest Reynolds County, in the U.S. state of Missouri.

The community is located at the junction of the West Fork of the Black River and McMurtrey Creek. Missouri Route PP connects the community with Missouri Route 72, four miles north of Bunker.

== History ==
A post office called Greeley was established in 1883, and remained in operation until 1956. The community has the name of Thomas Greeley, a businessperson in the local lumber industry.
