= Shut-in Creek =

Stream in the U.S. state of Missouri

Shut-in Creek is a stream in Iron and Reynolds Counties in the U.S. state of Missouri. It is a tributary of Imboden Fork.

The stream headwaters arise in Iron County within the Bell Mountain Wilderness at 37°40′03″N 90°50′15″W at an elevation of about 1,420 feet (430 m). The stream flows south-southwest passing between Bell and Lindsey mountains and enters Reynolds County. The stream turns south and southeast as it continues to its confluence with the Imboden Fork about one mile north of the community of Monterey. The confluence is at 37°34′55″N 90°51′03″W at an elevation of 892 ft (272 m). The confluence is just east of the northwest section of Johnson's Shut-Ins State Park.

Shut-in Creek was named for the fact its course runs through a valley between high peaks.

== See also ==
- List of rivers of Missouri
