= Marcoot, Missouri =

Extinct hamlet in Missouri, U.S.

Coordinates: 37°33′16″N 91°15′30″W

Marcoot is an extinct town in Reynolds County, in the U.S. state of Missouri. The GNIS classifies it as a populated place.

A post office called Marcoot was established in 1905, and remained in operation until 1938. It is unknown why the name "Marcoot" was applied to this community.
