= Bay Hollow =

Valley in Missouri, United States

Coordinates: 37.2311596°N 90.90929°W

Bay Hollow is a valley in Reynolds County in the U.S. state of Missouri.

Bay Hollow took its name from Bay Spring, which most likely has the name of the local Bay family.
