= Henderson Creek =

Henderson Creek may refer to:

- Henderson Creek (Illinois), United States
- Henderson Creek (Neals Creek tributary), a stream in Missouri, USA
- Te Wai-o-Pareira / Henderson Creek, a creek in the suburb of Henderson, in Auckland, New Zealand
