= Buford–Carty Farmstead =

- U.S. National Register of Historic Places
- Location within Missouri Location within the United States
- Location: 0.75 miles south of Highway J on County Road 814, near Black, Missouri
- Coordinates: 37°31′11″N 90°56′11″W
- Area: 0 acres (0 ha)
- Built: 1847
- Architectural style: Hewn-log house
- NRHP reference No.: 04000603
- Added to NRHP: June 16, 2004

Buford–Carty Farmstead, also known as Carty Log Cabin and Thomas Buford Homestead, is a historic home and farm located near Black, Reynolds County, Missouri. The original farmhouse was built in 1847, and is a 1 1/2 story, side-gabled, single-pen hewn log dwelling. It features a dropped-roof porch and a coursed stone exterior chimney. Also on the property are the contributing 40 foot by 60 foot gambrel roof barn and Carty family cemetery.

It was listed on the National Register of Historic Places in 2004.
