= Neals Creek =

Stream in the US state of Missouri

Neals Creek is a stream in southern Iron County in the U.S. state of Missouri. It is a tributary of Strother Creek.

The stream headwaters arise just south of Bixby at 37°39′23″N 91°06′59″W and an elevation of approximately 1310 feet. It flows generally to the southeast to its confluence with Strother Creek at 37°36′19″N 91°00′58″W and an elevation of 909 feet. The confluence is about 1000 feet north of the Iron-Reynolds county line.

Neals Creek has the name of Valentine Neal, a pioneer citizen.

== See also ==
- List of rivers of Missouri
