= Funk Branch =

Stream in the American state of Missouri

Funk Branch is a stream in Iron and Reynolds counties in the U.S. state of Missouri. It is a tributary of the Black River.

The stream headwaters arise in western Iron County (at 37°19′24″N 90°42′19″W) and its confluence with the Black River is in eastern Reynolds County (at 37°17′18″N 90°46′14″W). The source area of the stream lies about two miles south of Annapolis The confluence lies within the waters of the north end of Clearwater Lake.

Funk Branch has the name of a pioneer citizen.

== See also ==
- List of rivers of Missouri
