= Brooks Hollow =

Valley in Missouri, United States

- Location within Missouri

Geography
- Location: Reynolds County, Missouri, United States
- Coordinates: 37°26′04″N 90°57′30″W
- Interactive map of Brooks Hollow

Brooks Hollow is a valley in Reynolds County in the U.S. state of Missouri.

Brooks Hollow has the name of William Brooks, the original owner of the site.

== See also ==
- List of rivers of Missouri
