= McMurtrey Creek =

Stream in the US state of Missouri

McMurtrey Creek is a stream in northwest Reynolds County in the U.S. state of Missouri. It is a tributary of the West Fork Black River.

The stream headwaters arise in northern Reynolds County (at 37°34′29″N 91°12′42″W) at an elevation of about 1,280 feet (390 m) and flows south-southeast for about four miles to its confluence with the West Fork near the community of Greeley (at 37°31′00″N 91°11′11″W) at an elevation of 994 feet (303 m).

A variant spelling was "McMurty Creek". The creek has the name of the local McMurty family.

== See also ==
- List of rivers of Missouri
