= Coleman Hollow =

Valley in Missouri, United States

Coordinates: 37.2333812°N 91.0067921°W

Coleman Hollow is a valley in Reynolds County in the U.S. state of Missouri.

Coleman Hollow has the name of the local Coleman family.
