= Toms River (disambiguation) =

Toms River is a freshwater river and estuary in New Jersey

Toms River may also refer to:

== Communities ==
- Toms River, New Jersey, a township
  - Toms River CDP, New Jersey, a census-designated place and unincorporated area located within the township

== Schools in New Jersey ==
- Toms River Regional Schools, a regional public school district in Toms River, New Jersey
- Toms River High School East
- Toms River High School North
  - Toms River Fest, a festival event held on the campus of Toms River High School North
- Toms River High School South

== Other uses ==
- Toms River Railroad, a defunct New Jersey railroad
- Toms River (book), a 2013 nonfiction book by Dan Fagin

== See also ==
- South Toms River, New Jersey, a borough in Ocean County
- Long Tom River, a tributary of the Willamette River, in western Oregon, USA
- Tom River, a river in Russia, right tributary of the Ob
- Tom River (Amur Oblast), a river in Russia, left tributary of the Zeya
- Toms Creek (Missouri), a creek near Reynolds County, Missouri
- Toms Canyon impact crater, at a submarine canyon that is the drowned glacial-age mouth of Toms River off the coast of New Jersey.
