= Elaine Toms =

Elaine Toms may refer to:

- Elaine G. Toms, Canadian and British information scientist
- M. Elaine Toms (1917–2019), Korean-born American physicist
