= Ruble, Missouri =

Unincorporated community in Missouri, US

Coordinates: 37°08′54″N 90°53′46″W

Ruble is an unincorporated community in southern Reynolds County, in the U.S. state of Missouri. The community is on Missouri Route HH approximately seven miles southeast of Ellington. Webb Creek flows past the south side of the community to enter Clearwater Lake four miles to the east.

== History ==
A post office called Ruble was established in 1897, and remained in operation until 1956. The namesake of Ruble is unknown.
