= Munger (disambiguation) =

Munger is a historical city in Bihar, India, famous for its cigarette & gun factory.

Munger may also refer to:

== Places ==
=== U.S. places ===
- Munger, Minnesota and nearby Willard Munger State Trail
- Munger, Missouri
- A community in Merritt Township, Michigan

=== Other places ===
- Munger district, surrounding the town and forming part of the administrative Munger division in Bihar, India

== Other ==
- Munger (surname)
- Mrs. Munger's Class, television skit
