= Corridon, Missouri =

Unincorporated community in Missouri, US

Coordinates: 37°22′55″N 91°04′20″W

Corridon is an unincorporated community in western Reynolds County, Missouri, United States. It is located approximately one mile south of Reynolds and seven miles southwest of Centerville.

A post office called Corridon was established in 1901, and remained in operation until 1972. The name Corridon was selected by postal officials.
