= Dairyville, Missouri =

Extinct hamlet in Missouri, U.S.

Coordinates: 37.3486583°N 91.0831829°W

Dairyville is an extinct town in Reynolds County, in the U.S. state of Missouri.

The community was named for dairy farms in the area.
