= West Fork, Missouri =

Unincorporated community in the US state of Missouri

- Unincorporated community
- Interactive map of West Fork, Missouri
- Coordinates: 37°29′30″N 91°06′32″W
- Country: United States
- State: Missouri
- County: Reynolds

West Fork is an unincorporated community in Reynolds County, in the U.S. state of Missouri. The community lies on south bank of the West Fork of the Black River adjacent to the confluence of Toms Creek with the Black. The community lies approximately six miles east-northeast of Bunker on Missouri Route KK.

== History ==
The West Fork post office was discontinued in 1954. The community takes its name from West Fork Black River.
