= Munger, Missouri =

Unincorporated community in Missouri, U.S.

Coordinates: 37°35′51″N 90°47′47″W

Munger is an unincorporated community in northeast Reynolds County, in the U.S. state of Missouri.

The community is on Missouri Route N approximately one-third of a mile south of the Reynolds-Iron county line. It is approximately 8.5 miles west of Ironton and 4.5 miles northeast of Johnson's Shut-Ins State Park. The East Fork of the Black River flows past the community.

== History ==
An early variant name was "Mungers Mill". A post office called Munger was established in 1884, and remained in operation until 1932. The community has the name of the local Munger family.
