= Civil War Fortification at Barnesville =

- U.S. National Register of Historic Places
- Location within Missouri Location within the United States
- Location: Deer Run State Forest, near Ellington, Missouri
- Coordinates: 37°13′10″N 90°59′14″W
- Area: less than one acre
- Built: 1863
- NRHP reference No.: 98000817
- Added to NRHP: July 1, 1998

Civil War Fortification at Barnesville, also known as Fort Barnesville, is a historic American Civil War fortification located at Deer Run State Forest near Ellington, Reynolds County, Missouri. It was built in 1863, and consists of a horseshoe shaped redoubt. It measures approximately 150 feet long and 135 feet wide.

It was listed on the National Register of Historic Places in 1998.
