= Bee Fork, Missouri =

Unincorporated community in the US state of Missouri

Coordinates: 37°26′29″N 91°05′04″W

Bee Fork is an unincorporated community in Reynolds County, in the U.S. state of Missouri.

The community is on Bee Fork. Missouri Route TT passes approximately one half mile to the west and Centerville is about 6.5 miles to the east.

== History ==
A post office called Bee Fork was established in 1874, the name was changed to Beefork in 1895, and the post office closed in 1914. The community takes its name from nearby Bee Fork.
