= Christian Hollow =

Valley in Missouri, United States

Coordinates: 37.226159°N 91.0323483°W

Christian Hollow is a valley in Reynolds County in the U.S. state of Missouri.

Christian Hollow bears the name of a pioneer citizen.
