= Mayberry Branch =

Stream in the American state of Missouri

Mayberry Branch is a stream in Reynolds County in the U.S. state of Missouri. It is a tributary of the Black River.

The stream headwaters arise at 37.3°N 90.8°W at an elevation of approximately 920 feet. The stream flows southeast and east for about five miles to its confluence with the Black River at 37°20′10″N 90°47′30″W at an elevation of 577 feet.

Mayberry Branch has the name of the local Mayberry family.

== See also ==
- List of rivers of Missouri
