= Walker Branch =

Stream in Reynolds County, Missouri, U.S.

Coordinates: 37.510326°N 90.840400°W

Walker Branch is a stream in Reynolds County in the U.S. state of Missouri. It is a tributary of the East Fork Black River.

Walker Branch has the name of the local Walker family.

== See also ==
- List of rivers of Missouri
