= Smithboro =

Smithboro may refer to:

- Smithboro, Illinois, United States, a village
- Smithboro, Missouri, United States, an unincorporated community
- Smithboro, a hamlet in Tioga, New York, United States
- Smithborough, County Monaghan, Ireland, a village (also known as Smithboro)
