= Pinkley, Missouri =

Extinct hamlet in Missouri, U.S.

Coordinates: 37.502270°N 90.826511°W

Pinkley is an extinct town in Reynolds County, in the U.S. state of Missouri.

A post office called Pinkley was established in 1920, and remained in operation until 1926. The community has the name of the local Pinkley family.
