= Knox Branch =

Stream in Wayne County, Missouri, U.S.

Coordinates: 37°00′30″N 90°36′52″W

Knox Branch is a stream in Wayne County in the U.S. state of Missouri. It is a tributary of the Black River.

The identity of namesake "Knox" is unknown.

== See also ==
- List of rivers of Missouri
