= Robinson Hollow =

Valley in Missouri, United States

Coordinates: 37.347826°N 90.898178°W

Robinson Hollow is a valley in Reynolds County in the U.S. state of Missouri.

Robinson Hollow has the name of the local Robinson family.
