= Monterey, Missouri =

Unincorporated community in Missouri, U.S.

Coordinates: 37°34′19″N 90°51′11″W

Monterey is an unincorporated community in northern Reynolds County, in the U.S. state of Missouri.

The community is on Missouri Route MM just east of Johnson's Shut-Ins State Park. Shut-in Creek flows past the community.

== History ==
A post office called Monterey was established in 1894, and remained in operation until 1957. The community most likely takes its name from Monterey, California, perhaps via the Battle of Monterey.
