= Shut-in (river) =

Type of rock formation found in Ozarks streams

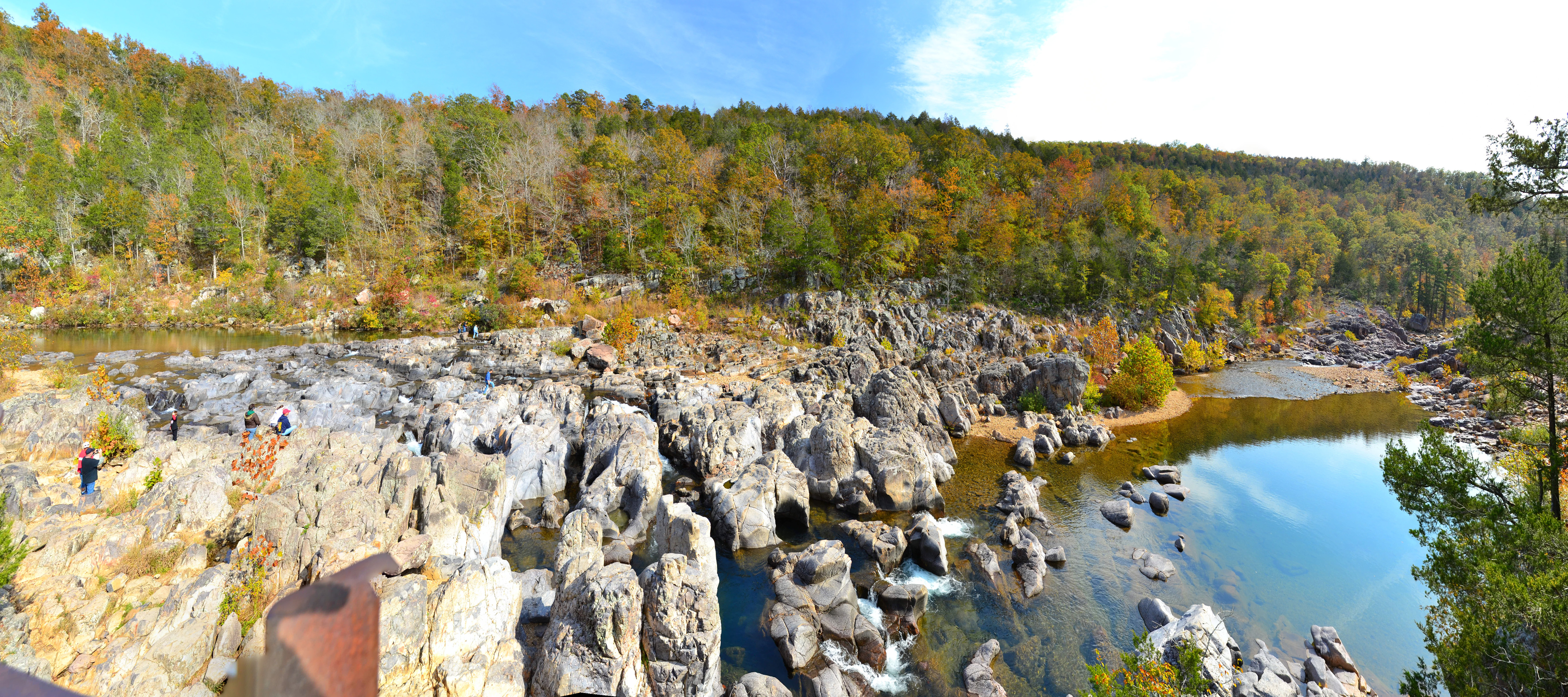
Johnson's Shut-Ins panorama

A shut-in is a type of rock formation found in streams in the Ozarks, comprising pools, rivulets, rapids and plunge pools. The term has an origin in Appalachia.

== Description ==
A shut-in is a rock formation that carves through a mountain range, causing a complex of pools, rivulets, rapids and plunge pools. They are found in streams in the Ozarks. Shut-ins are inherently confined to a narrow valley or canyon, with the river valley widening out both above and below the formation. Because the rock resists downcutting, streams typically descend at a relatively steep gradient through shut-ins, with the downstream terminus of the formation often marked by a very large plunge pool. The river becomes unnavigable at shut-ins even by canoe due to the rapids and narrow channels.

== Etymology ==
The term has an origin in Appalachia, where it was used to refer to a narrow river gorge confined by resistant rock layers.

== Examples ==
Johnson's Shut-Ins State Park in Missouri, with its hard rhyolite and a diabase dike that diverts the Black River into many small streamlets following a complex joint system, is the best-known example. More than ninety other shut–ins occur within and around the St. Francois Mountains region of southeast Missouri. In southern Illinois, the Burden Falls Wilderness area includes a narrow canyon below a waterfall that is confined by a resistant sandstone layer; the gorge is referred to as a shut–in, following the Appalachian usage for the term.

== See also ==
- Downcutting – Process of deepening a stream channel by erosion of the bottom material
