= Fruit City, Missouri =

Unincorporated community in Missouri, U.S.

Coordinates: 37°17′26″N 91°02′20″W

Fruit City is an unincorporated community in Reynolds County, in the U.S. state of Missouri.

== History ==
A post office called Fruit City was established in 1912, and remained in operation until 1922. The community was so named on account of orchards near the original town site.
