= Hadley, Missouri =

Unincorporated community in Missouri, U.S.

Coordinates: 37°04′22″N 90°47′53″W

Hadley is an unincorporated community in southern Reynolds County, in the U.S. state of Missouri. The community is in the southeast corner of the county and approximately 4.5 mile west of Leepr in adjacent Wayne County.

== History ==
A post office called Hadley was established in 1911, and remained in operation until 1951. The community most likely has the name of Herbert S. Hadley, 32nd Governor of Missouri.
