= Edgehill, Missouri =

Unincorporated community in Missouri, U.S.

Coordinates: 37°35′18″N 90°56′00″W

Edgehill is an unincorporated community in northern Reynolds County, in the U.S. state of Missouri.

The community is located at the intersection of Missouri routes 49 and A approximately one mile south of the Reynolds-Iron county line. The Middle Fork of the Black River passes the west side of the community.

== History ==
A post office called Edge Hill was established in 1870, the name was changed to Edgehill in 1894, and the post office closed in 1932. The community was so named on account of its location.
