= Mill Spring Creek =

Stream in the American state of Missouri

Mill Spring Creek is a small stream that is located in Wayne County, in the U.S. state of Missouri. It is a tributary of the Black River.

The stream's source is a spring that emerges on the northeast edge of the Black River floodplain, just south of the community of Mill Spring at 37°03′35″N 90°40′55″W. The stream flows south-southeast for one half mile to its confluence with the Black at 37°03′14″N 90°40′45″W.

Mill Spring Creek was named for the fact that it was fed by a spring which powered a watermill.

== See also ==
- List of rivers of Missouri
