= Plunge pool =

Depression at the base of a waterfall

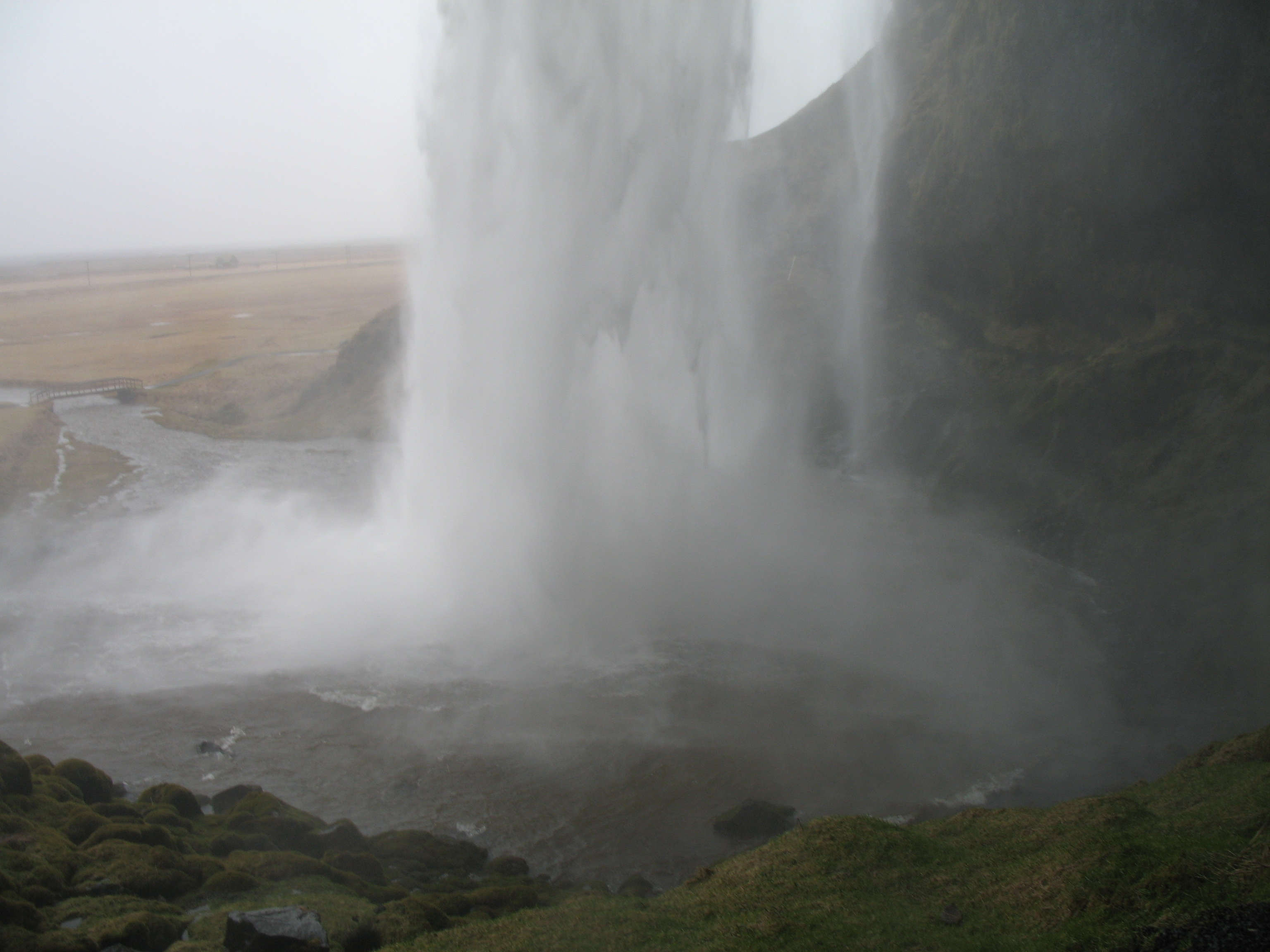
Surface of the Seljalandsfoss plunge pool (Iceland)

Water going over the falls carries sand and pebbles that scour a plunge pool at its base.

A plunge pool (or plunge basin or waterfall lake) is a deep depression in a stream bed at the base of a waterfall or shut-in. It is created by the erosional forces of cascading water on the rocks at the formation's base where the water impacts. The term may refer to the water occupying the depression, or the depression itself.

== Formation ==
Plunge pools are formed by the natural force of falling water, such as at a waterfall or cascade; they also result from man-made structures such as some spillway designs. Plunge pools are often very deep, generally related to the height of the fall, the volume of water, the resistance of the rock below the pool and other factors. The impacting and swirling water, sometimes carrying rocks within it, abrades the riverbed into a basin, which often features rough and irregular sides. Plunge pools can remain long after the waterfall has ceased flow or the stream has been diverted. Several examples of former plunge pools exist at Dry Falls in the Channeled Scablands of eastern Washington. They can also be found underwater in areas that were formerly above sea level, for example, Perth Canyon off the coast of Western Australia.

Plunge pools are fluvial features of erosion which occur in the youthful stage of river development, characterized by steeper gradients and faster water flows. Where softer or fractured rock has been eroded back to a knickpoint, water continues to bombard its base. Because this rock is often less resistant than overlying strata, the water from the higher elevation continues eroding downward until an equilibrium is achieved.

A somewhat similar bowl-shaped feature developed by flowing water, as opposed to falling water, is known as a scour hole. These occur both naturally and as a result of bridge building.

== See also ==
- Stream pool
- List of waterfalls by flow rate
- List of waterfalls by type
- Riffle – Shallow landform in a flowing channel
- Tinaja – Depression landform in bedrock
