= Pogue Hollow =

Valley in Missouri, United States

Coordinates: 37.3428257°N 90.9442905°W

Pogue Hollow is a valley in Reynolds County in the U.S. state of Missouri. Pogue Hollow is also a cove at Lake of the Ozarks named for the same reason.

Pogue Hollow was most likely named after W. A. Pogue, an early settler.
