= Eads Creek =

Stream in Wayne County, Missouri, U.S.

Coordinates: 37°00′45″N 90°37′11″W

Eads Creek is a stream in Wayne County in the U.S. state of Missouri. It is a tributary of the Black River.

Eads Creek has the name of Jack Eads, an early citizen.

== See also ==
- List of rivers of Missouri
