= Chevrolet, Kentucky =

Unincorporated community in Kentucky, United States

- Unincorporated community
- Location within Kentucky Location within the United States
- Coordinates: 36°49′2″N 83°16′29″W
- Country: United States
- State: Kentucky
- County: Harlan
- Elevation: 1,325 ft (404 m)
- Time zone: UTC-6 (Central (EST))
  - Summer (DST): UTC-5 (EST)
- ZIP codes: 40817
- GNIS feature ID: 489465

Chevrolet is an unincorporated community in Harlan County, Kentucky, United States.

== History ==
A post office called Chevrolet was established in 1918, and remained in operation until 1992. The community was named after the Chevrolet Series 490, the first car seen on local roads.

A 1935 newspaper account reported the town had 800 inhabitants, and about 60 cars, 30 of which were Chevrolets.
