= Bills Creek (Sugar Creek tributary) =

Stream in West Virginia, United States

Coordinates: 39°06′27″N 79°56′56″W

Bills Creek is a stream in the U.S. state of West Virginia. It is a tributary of Sugar Creek.

Bills Creek derives its name from William Barker, a local pioneer.

== See also ==
- List of rivers of West Virginia
