= Bills Creek (Current River tributary) =

Stream in the American state of Missouri

Location
- Country: United States
- State: Missouri
- County: Ripley

Physical characteristics
- Source
  - location: 36°38′53″N 90°47′54″W
- Mouth: Current River
  - location: 36°38′25″N 90°50′40″W

Bills Creek is a stream in Ripley County in the Ozarks of southeast Missouri. It is a tributary of the Current River.

The stream headwaters are at 36°38′53″N 90°47′54″W and the confluence with the Current is at 36°38′25″N 90°50′40″W. The source area lies just northwest of the junction of Missouri Route 21 and U.S. Route 160 north of the community of Hilltop and northeast of Doniphan. The stream flows west-southwest passing under Missouri Route Y and entering the Current River just east of the Mark Twain National Forest boundary.

Bills Creek has the name of William Butler Richmond, an early settler.

== See also ==
- List of rivers of Missouri
