= Henderson Creek (Neals Creek tributary) =

Stream in the U.S. state of Missouri

Henderson Creek is a stream in western Iron County in the U.S. state of Missouri. It is a tributary of Neals Creek.

The stream headwaters arise just south of Missouri Route 32 about 1.5 miles east of Bixby. The stream flows southeast for about 2.5 miles to its confluence with Neals Creek. Missouri Route 49 runs parallel to the stream on the ridge to the east. The source area is at 37°40′16″N 91°04′02″W and the confluence is at 37°38′24″N 91°02′24″W.

Henderson Creek is named after the local Henderson family.

== See also ==
- List of rivers of Missouri
