= Bee Fork (Mill Creek tributary) =

Stream in the American state of Missouri

Coordinates: 36°30′51″N 91°16′52″W

Bee Fork is a stream in Oregon County of the U.S. state of Missouri. It is a tributary of Mill Creek.

The stream headwaters are at and the confluence with Mill Creek is approximately one mile west-northwest of Myrtle at .

Bee Fork was so named because honeybees were observed near its course.

== See also ==
- List of rivers of Missouri
