= Shut Out =

Shut Out may refer to:

- Shutout, a game in which one team prevents the opposing team from scoring
- Shut Out (album), a 1977 album by Paul Jabara
- "Shut Out" (song), a 1977 song by Paul Jabara and Donna Summer
- "Shutout", a song by The Walker Brothers from their 1978 album Nite Flights
- Shut Out (horse), a thoroughbred racehorse
