= Shutdown =

Shutdown or shut down may refer to:

- Government shutdowns
- Shutdown (computing)
- Shutdown (economics)
- Shutdown (nuclear reactor)

== Arts and entertainment ==
=== Music ===
- "Shut Down" (The Beach Boys song), 1963
- Shut Down Volume 2, a 1964 album by the Beach Boys, and "Shut Down, Part II", a track on the album
- Shut Down (album), a multi-artist compilation album of 1963 with hot rod music
- "Shut Down" (Australian Crawl song), 1982
- "Shutdown" (Skepta song), 2015
- "Shut Down" (Blackpink song), a song by Blackpink from their 2022 album Born Pink
- "Shut Down", a song by Soul Asylum from the 1995 album Let Your Dim Light Shine
- "Shutdown", a song by Pitchshifter from the 2002 album PSI

=== Television ===
- "Shut Down" (Prison Break), an episode of the TV series
- "Shutdown" (Good Girls), an episode of the TV series
- "Shutdown", an episode of The West Wing season 5

== See also ==
- General strike
- Occupational burnout
- Shutdown valve
- Ventilation shutdown
