= Lesterville, Missouri =

Unincorporated community in Missouri, U.S.

Coordinates: 37°27′14″N 90°50′36″W

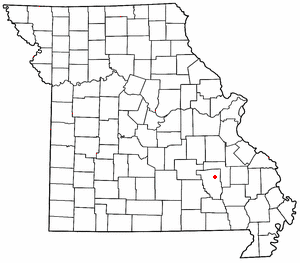

Lesterville is an unincorporated community in southeast Missouri, United States. It is located in Reynolds County on Routes 21, 49, and 72 near the Black River. The ZIP Code for Lesterville is 63654.

== History ==
The community has the name of George Lester, a pioneer citizen.

Lesterville has been the home to Camp Taum Sauk since opening in 1946.

The first bank/store/post office has been reopened as a General Store and Florist now called First Dawn General Store. It was built in 1882. The building was also the site of the first electricity in Lesterville, as well as the first telephone.

== Education ==
Lesterville R-IV School District operates two schools in the community: Lesterville Elementary School and Lesterville High School.

Lesterville has a public library, a branch of the Reynolds County Library District.
