= Smithboro, Missouri =

Unincorporated community in Missouri, U.S.

Coordinates: 37°23′32″N 90°49′28″W

Smithboro is an unincorporated community in Reynolds County, in the U.S. state of Missouri.

== History ==
A post office called Smithboro was established in 1901, and remained in operation until 1909. The community has the name of one Mr. Smith, a first settler.
