= Tom's Ice Cream Bowl =

Ice cream parlor in Zanesville, Ohio

- Interactive map of Tom's Ice Cream Bowl

Restaurant information
- Established: 1948; 78 years ago
- Owner: Joe Baker
- Previous owners: Jack Hemmer, Tom Mirgon, Bill Sullivan
- Food type: American
- Location: 532 McIntire Avenue, Zanesville, Ohio 43701-3342, United States
- Coordinates: 39.948°N 82.0110°W
- Website: www.tomsicecreambowl.com

Tom's Ice Cream Bowl is an ice cream parlor and restaurant in Zanesville, Ohio, founded in 1948 as the Jack Hemmer Ice Cream Company. It is a Zanesville tourist attraction and a cultural icon and institution.

== History ==
Tom's Ice Cream Bowl was founded in 1948 by cousins Jack Hemmer and Tom Mirgon. The shop was located in a small space on Linden Avenue in Zanesville, Ohio, and was originally named the Jack Hemmer Ice Cream Company.

In October 1950, they moved the restaurant to its current location on McIntire Avenue. In 1953, Tom Mirgon bought the remainder of the store from Jack Hemmer. In 1957, Mirgon renamed the shop to Tom's Ice Cream Bowl, after a customer was surprised by the large size of the sundaes and demanded, "Put mine in a soup bowl!".

Bill Sullivan, began working at Tom's Ice Cream Bowl in 1968 while a high school student. In 1970, Sullivan was drafted to the U.S. Army and left Zanesville. He later returned, and in 1979 was eating lunch at the shop when Tom Mirgon asked Sullivan to return to the shop as a manager. Sullivan agreed to return, as long as he would have the opportunity to purchase the store when it became available. Mirgon retired from his position on April 1, 1984, selling the store to Sullivan. Tom's Ice Cream Bowl became known for its service by serving prodigious quantities of ice cream in soup-sized bowls, which was the iconic source of the eponymous name. There was an understanding that they "would never change its name." In 2019, Sullivan sold the shop to longtime manager, Joe Baker.

The restaurant has 1950s decor, and waiters still wear aprons and bow ties when serving. They are famous for their Tin Roof Sundaes, and for serving their ice cream in soup bowls.

In 1998, the shop was named one of the top ice cream shops in the country by USA Today. It is listed as a travel destination for ice cream aficionados. Rick Sebak, who researched and produced An Ice Cream Show for the Public Broadcasting System, rated it as one of the ten best ice cream producers in the U.S.A. He conducted his research, and "the Pittsburgher nobly gained 30 pounds in one summer researching [the show]. We're not talking supermarket stuff." It's made on-site and small batches from premium ingredients and "full of butterfat ('that's what makes it taste so good.')"

The store is a well worn Zanesville tradition. "Their sundaes are legendary", and their product and setting is quirky. It is the only place in Zanesville that makes ice cream on a daily basis. It is unique. It is a complement to a tourist's visit to Zanesville, joining the Y-bridge and "Vasehenge" (which celebrates Zanesville's historic import as a center of pottery making) as a Zanesville attraction. Tom's Ice Cream Bowl "has gone from a Zanesville staple to a global tourist attraction".

== In popular culture ==
In 2017, Tom's was featured on the Food Network television show "Ice Cream Nation".

Many celebrities and politicians have visited Tom's, including John Glenn, Mitt Romney, John Kasich, Troy Balderson, and Mark Dantonio. Mitt Romney held a campaign rally outside the shop in August 2012. After Romney's visit, Sullivan named an ice cream flavor "White House" after him.
