= Buick, Missouri =

- Former community
- Location within Missouri Location within the United States
- Coordinates: 37°36′25″N 91°07′36″W
- Country: United States
- State: Missouri
- County: Iron
- Elevation: 1,447 ft (441 m)
- Time zone: UTC-6 (Central (CST))
  - Summer (DST): UTC-5 (CDT)
- GNIS feature ID: 749103

Buick is an extinct town in southwest Iron County, in the U.S. state of Missouri. The GNIS classifies it as a populated place.

The town was located on Missouri Route KK, four miles southeast of Boss and 3.5 miles south of Bixby.

The area is the location of the Buick Mine, owned by the Doe Run Company.

A post office called Buick was established in 1918, and remained in operation until 1955. The community was named for the fact the first car owner in the area drove a Buick.

== See also ==
- Chevrolet, Kentucky
