= Elaine G. Toms =

Canadian information scientist

Elaine G. Toms is a Canadian information scientist working in human–computer interaction and known for her research on information retrieval, usability of web sites, and the measurement of user engagement. She is Professor of Information Innovation & Management at the Sheffield University Management School, part of the University of Sheffield in England.

== Education and career ==
Toms was a student at Dalhousie University, and completed a Ph.D. in 1997 at the University of Western Ontario.

Toms was president of the Canadian Association for Information Science for 1998–1999. After four years in the Faculty of Information Studies at the University of Toronto, she returned to Dalhousie in 2004, as associate professor and Canada Research Chair in Management Informatics. She moved from Dalhousie to Sheffield in 2011.
