= M. Elaine Toms =

Korean-born American physicist (1917–2019)

Marian Elaine Toms (May 17, 1917 – June 25, 2019) was a Korean-born American physicist at the United States Naval Research Laboratory known for her experiments on photodisintegration of metals and for her Bibliography of Photonuclear Reactions.

== Life and work ==
Toms was born in Seoul, at the time part of Japanese-occupied Korea. She was one of three children of J. U. Selwyn Toms, a Presbyterian minister originally from South Australia who had been stationed in Korea with his wife Ella Burt Toms beginning in 1908. The Toms family returned to the US in 1923. Toms became an undergraduate at Wilson College, a small Presbyterian school in Pennsylvania, where she graduated in 1939.

During World War II, she served as a lieutenant in the WAVES. Her work with the WAVES included basic training at Smith College, and the study of radar at Harvard University, before going on active duty until 1946. In that year she moved to the United States Navy Reserve and became a researcher at the United States Naval Research Laboratory, working in the Betatron Section of the Nuclear Interactions Branch of the Nucleonics Division.

While continuing as a researcher at the Naval Research Laboratory, she returned to graduate study at the University of Pennsylvania, where she earned a master's degree in 1947. Much of her work on nuclear physics remains classified, but her open publications include several works on photodisintegration. She spent 32 years in the Navy Reserve, from 1943 until her 1975 retirement from the Naval Research Laboratory as a commander.

She died on June 25, 2019, in Cromwell, Connecticut.

== Recognition ==
In 1965, Toms was named a Fellow of the American Physical Society.

In 2016, her home town of Cromwell, Connecticut selected her as their "vet of the year".
