= Reynolds, Reynolds County, Missouri =

Unincorporated community in Missouri, U.S.

Coordinates: 37.401°N 91.073°W

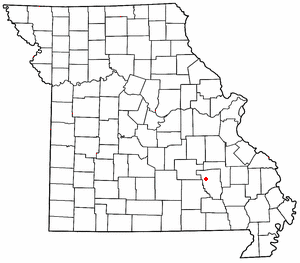

Reynolds is an unincorporated community in western Reynolds County, Missouri, United States. It is located at the intersection of Route 72 and Missouri Route B approximately six miles southwest of Centerville.

A variant name was "Tralaloo". A post office called Tralaloo was established in 1904, and the name was changed to Reynolds in 1905. The present name is after Reynolds County.
