= Ellington, Missouri =

- City
- Location of Ellington, Missouri
- Coordinates: 37°14′12″N 90°58′24″W
- Country: United States
- State: Missouri
- County: Reynolds

Area
  - Total: 1.46 sq mi (3.79 km^{2})
  - Land: 1.46 sq mi (3.79 km^{2})
  - Water: 0 sq mi (0.00 km^{2})
- Elevation: 732 ft (223 m)

Population (2020)
  - Total: 790
  - Density: 540.4/sq mi (208.65/km^{2})
- Time zone: UTC-6 (Central (CST))
  - Summer (DST): UTC-5 (CDT)
- ZIP code: 63638
- Area code: 573
- FIPS code: 29-21844
- GNIS feature ID: 2394662

Ellington is a city in Reynolds County, Missouri, United States. The population was 790 at the 2020 census. In 1925, the infamous Tri-State Tornado began just northwest of Ellington.

== History ==
Ellington, formerly known as Barnesville, was renamed in 1856 for Sina Huff Ellington, who permitted a railroad line to be extended through her family's farmland. An early variant name was "Logan's Creek". A post office called Logan's Creek was established in 1845, and the name was changed to Ellington in 1895.

The Civil War Fortification at Barnesville was listed on the National Register of Historic Places in 1998.

== Geography ==
According to the United States Census Bureau, the city has a total area of 1.38 square miles (3.57 km^{2}), all land. Being located within thirty miles of Eminence, Van Buren and Lesterville makes Ellington a popular stop among Ozark National Scenic Riverways tourists.

=== Sweetwater lead mine ===
The Sweetwater Mine is located approximately 12 miles northwest of Ellington and is owned by the Doe Run Company. The mine produces lead and zinc.

== Demographics ==
Historical population
Census	Pop.	Note	%±
1920	452		—
1930	655		44.9%
1940	849		29.6%
1950	777		−8.5%
1960	812		4.5%
1970	1,094		34.7%
1980	1,215		11.1%
1990	994		−18.2%
2000	1,045		5.1%
2010	987		−5.6%
2020	790		−20.0%
U.S. Decennial Census

=== 2010 census ===
As of the census of 2010, there were 987 people, 407 households, and 241 families residing in the city. The population density was 715.2 inhabitants per square mile (276.1/km^{2}). There were 488 housing units at an average density of 353.6 per square mile (136.5/km^{2}). The racial makeup of the city was 98.38% White, 0.20% Black or African American, 0.41% Native American, 0.20% Asian, and 0.81% from two or more races. Hispanic or Latino of any race were 1.11% of the population.

There were 407 households, of which 37.3% had children under the age of 18 living with them, 39.8% were married couples living together, 15.2% had a female householder with no husband present, 4.2% had a male householder with no wife present, and 40.8% were non-families. 34.2% of all households were made up of individuals, and 19.7% had someone living alone who was 65 years of age or older. The average household size was 2.42 and the average family size was 3.08.

The median age in the city was 37.1 years. 27.8% of residents were under the age of 18; 8.4% were between the ages of 18 and 24; 23.1% were from 25 to 44; 24.2% were from 45 to 64; and 16.7% were 65 years of age or older. The gender makeup of the city was 45.8% male and 54.2% female.

=== 2000 census ===
As of the census of 2000, there were 1,045 people, 456 households, and 285 families residing in the city. The population density was 740.8 inhabitants per square mile (286.0/km^{2}). There were 535 housing units at an average density of 379.3 per square mile (146.4/km^{2}). The racial makeup of the city was 96.08% White, 0.77% Native American, 0.77% Asian, 0.48% from other races, and 1.91% from two or more races. Hispanic or Latino of any race were 0.96% of the population.

There were 456 households, out of which 32.2% had children under the age of 18 living with them, 47.1% were married couples living together, 12.5% had a female householder with no husband present, and 37.5% were non-families. 35.1% of all households were made up of individuals, and 18.9% had someone living alone who was 65 years of age or older. The average household size was 2.29 and the average family size was 2.93.

In the city the population was spread out, with 26.7% under the age of 18, 8.7% from 18 to 24, 26.8% from 25 to 44, 20.1% from 45 to 64, and 17.7% who were 65 years of age or older. The median age was 35 years. For every 100 females there were 85.3 males. For every 100 females age 18 and over, there were 83.7 males.

The median income for a household in the city was $21,836, and the median income for a family was $27,443. Males had a median income of $26,172 versus $16,250 for females. The per capita income for the city was $12,026. About 16.4% of families and 21.2% of the population were below the poverty line, including 30.3% of those under age 18 and 15.4% of those age 65 or over.

== Education ==
Southern Reynolds County R-II School District operates two schools at Ellington: Ellington Elementary School and Ellington High School.

Ellington has a public library, a branch of the Reynolds County Library District.

== Climate ==
Ellington has a humid subtropical climate (Köppen climate classification Cfa).

Climate data for Ellington
Month	Jan	Feb	Mar	Apr	May	Jun	Jul	Aug	Sep	Oct	Nov	Dec	Year
Mean daily maximum °F (°C)	42 (6)	50 (10)	59 (15)	71 (22)	79 (26)	87 (31)	92 (33)	90 (32)	81 (27)	70 (21)	57 (14)	46 (8)	69 (20)
Mean daily minimum °F (°C)	20 (−7)	24 (−4)	33 (1)	42 (6)	51 (11)	61 (16)	66 (19)	63 (17)	56 (13)	43 (6)	34 (1)	24 (−4)	43 (6)
Average precipitation inches (mm)	3.11 (79)	3.07 (78)	4.50 (114)	4.50 (114)	4.48 (114)	3.72 (94)	3.87 (98)	3.55 (90)	3.36 (85)	3.14 (80)	4.82 (122)	3.99 (101)	46.11 (1,171)

== Notable person ==
- Carter Buford (1876–1959), multi-term Missouri State Senator, was born and educated in Ellington.

== See also ==
- Southeast Missouri Lead District
