= Centerville, Missouri =

City in Missouri, U.S.

- City
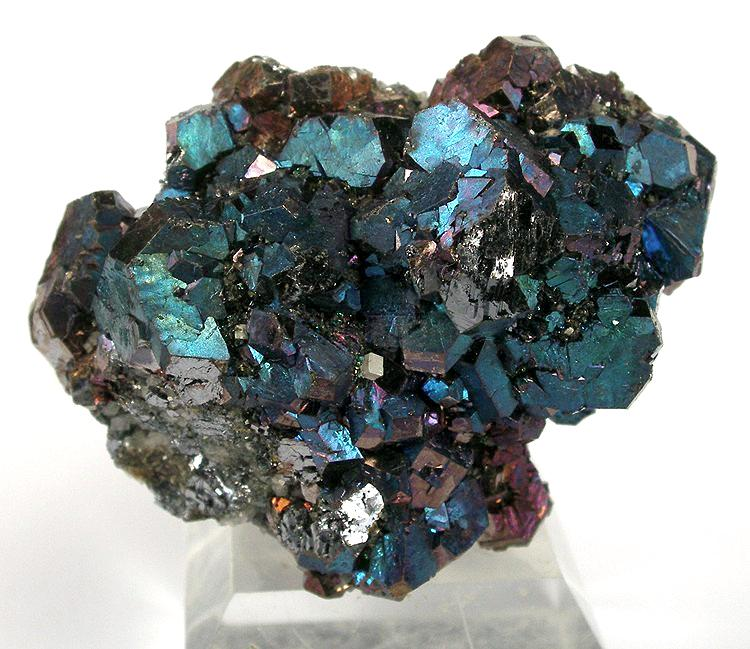
- Galena from the West Fork Mine, near Centerville

- Location of Centerville, Missouri
- Coordinates: 37°26′12″N 90°57′37″W
- Country: United States
- State: Missouri
- County: Reynolds

Area
  - Total: 0.32 sq mi (0.84 km^{2})
  - Land: 0.32 sq mi (0.83 km^{2})
  - Water: 0.0039 sq mi (0.01 km^{2})
- Elevation: 738 ft (225 m)

Population (2020)
  - Total: 167
  - Density: 523.6/sq mi (202.16/km^{2})
- Time zone: UTC-6 (Central (CST))
  - Summer (DST): UTC-5 (CDT)
- ZIP code: 63633
- Area code: 573
- FIPS code: 29-12718
- GNIS feature ID: 2393785

Centerville is a city in and the county seat of Reynolds County, Missouri, United States, situated along the West Fork of the Black River. The population was 167 at the 2020 census.

== History ==
A post office called Centreville was established in 1846, and the name was changed to Centerville in 1892. Centerville was named from its central location in the county.

== Geography ==
According to the United States Census Bureau, the city has a total area of 0.30 square miles (0.78 km^{2}), all land.

=== West Fork Lead Mine ===
The West Fork Mine is a lead-zinc-silver-copper mine located near Centerville. Initially developed by ASARCO, it reached full production of 3,400 tons/day of ore in August 1988. It is currently owned and operated by the Doe Run Company, which acquired the Missouri Lead Division operation of ASARCO in 1998. The mine produces about 46,000 tons of lead, 6,800 tons zinc, and 3,900 kg of silver per year.

== Demographics ==
Historical population
Census	Pop.	Note	%±
1960	163		—
1970	209		28.2%
1980	241		15.3%
1990	89		−63.1%
2000	171		92.1%
2010	191		11.7%
2020	167		−12.6%
U.S. Decennial Census

=== 2010 census ===
As of the census of 2010, there were 191 people, 78 households, and 50 families living in the city. The population density was 636.7 inhabitants per square mile (245.8/km^{2}). There were 99 housing units at an average density of 330.0 per square mile (127.4/km^{2}). The racial makeup of the city was 95.29% White, 2.09% Black or African American, 0.52% Native American, and 2.09% from two or more races.

There were 78 households, of which 23.1% had children under the age of 18 living with them, 43.6% were married couples living together, 12.8% had a female householder with no husband present, 7.7% had a male householder with no wife present, and 35.9% were non-families. 30.8% of all households were made up of individuals, and 18% had someone living alone who was 65 years of age or older. The average household size was 2.31 and the average family size was 2.84.

The median age in the city was 44.5 years. 20.4% of residents were under the age of 18; 6.9% were between the ages of 18 and 24; 23% were from 25 to 44; 26.7% were from 45 to 64; and 23% were 65 years of age or older. The gender makeup of the city was 52.9% male and 47.1% female.

=== 2000 census ===
As of the census of 2000, there were 171 people, 70 households, and 46 families living in the city. The population density was 534.3 inhabitants per square mile (206.3/km^{2}). There were 102 housing units at an average density of 318.7 per square mile (123.1/km^{2}). The racial makeup of the city was 94.15% White, 3.51% Native American, and 2.34% from two or more races.

There were 70 households, out of which 20.0% had children under the age of 18 living with them, 54.3% were married couples living together, 10.0% had a female householder with no husband present, and 32.9% were non-families. 31.4% of all households were made up of individuals, and 7.1% had someone living alone who was 65 years of age or older. The average household size was 2.30 and the average family size was 2.85.

In the city, the population was spread out, with 17.5% under the age of 18, 15.2% from 18 to 24, 18.1% from 25 to 44, 31.6% from 45 to 64, and 17.5% who were 65 years of age or older. The median age was 44 years. For every 100 females, there were 111.1 males. For every 100 females age 18 and over, there were 107.4 males.

The median income for a household in the city was $23,864, and the median income for a family was $29,750. Males had a median income of $30,250 versus $30,000 for females. The per capita income for the city was $13,207. About 9.8% of families and 21.1% of the population were below the poverty line, including 56.0% of those under the age of eighteen and none of those 65 or over.

== Education ==
Centerville R-I School District operates Centerville Elementary School.

Centerville has a public library, a branch of the Reynolds County Library District.

== See also ==
- List of cities in Missouri
- Southeast Missouri Lead District
