= Bunker, Missouri =

- City
- Location of Bunker, Missouri
- Coordinates: 37°27′26″N 91°12′43″W
- Country: United States
- State: Missouri
- Counties: Reynolds, Dent

Area
  - Total: 0.66 sq mi (1.72 km^{2})
  - Land: 0.66 sq mi (1.72 km^{2})
  - Water: 0 sq mi (0.00 km^{2})
- Elevation: 1,381 ft (421 m)

Population (2020)
  - Total: 295
  - Density: 445.0/sq mi (171.82/km^{2})
- Time zone: UTC-6 (Central (CST))
  - Summer (DST): UTC-5 (CDT)
- ZIP code: 63629
- Area code: 573
- FIPS code: 29-09694
- GNIS feature ID: 2393462

Bunker is a town in Dent and Reynolds counties in the U.S. state of Missouri. The population was 295 at the 2020 census.

== History ==
Bunker was founded in 1907 by Sylvanus J. Bunker, a businessperson in the lumbering industry.

== Geography ==
According to the United States Census Bureau, the town has a total area of 0.66 square miles (1.71 km^{2}), all land.

== Demographics ==
Historical population
Census	Pop.	Note	%±
1960	401		—
1970	447		11.5%
1980	673		50.6%
1990	390		−42.1%
2000	427		9.5%
2010	407		−4.7%
2020	295		−27.5%
U.S. Decennial Census

=== 2010 census ===
As of the census of 2010, there were 407 people, 167 households, and 107 families living in the town. The population density was 616.7 inhabitants per square mile (238.1/km^{2}). There were 196 housing units at an average density of 297.0 per square mile (114.7/km^{2}). The racial makeup of the town was 99.26% White, 0.25% Native American, and 0.49% from two or more races. Hispanic or Latino of any race were 0.98% of the population.

There were 167 households, of which 32.9% had children under the age of 18 living with them, 43.7% were married couples living together, 16.2% had a female householder with no husband present, 4.2% had a male householder with no wife present, and 35.9% were non-families. 33.5% of all households were made up of individuals, and 15.6% had someone living alone who was 65 years of age or older. The average household size was 2.37 and the average family size was 2.98.

The median age in the city was 38.3 years. 27.3% of residents were under the age of 18; 7.8% were between the ages of 18 and 24; 24.1% were from 25 to 44; 26.8% were from 45 to 64; and 14.3% were 65 years of age or older. The gender makeup of the town was 49.4% male and 50.6% female.

=== 2000 census ===
As of the census of 2000, there were 427 people, 176 households, and 111 families living in the town. The population density was 661.8 inhabitants per square mile (255.5/km^{2}). There were 196 housing units at an average density of 303.8 per square mile (117.3/km^{2}). The racial makeup of the town was 92.97% White, 0.23% African American, 2.11% Native American, 0.23% Asian, 0.23% from other races, and 4.22% from two or more races. Hispanic or Latino of any race were 2.11% of the population.

There were 176 households, out of which 33.0% had children under the age of 18 living with them, 45.5% were married couples living together, 13.6% had a female householder with no husband present, and 36.4% were non-families. 31.8% of all households were made up of individuals, and 15.3% had someone living alone who was 65 years of age or older. The average household size was 2.36 and the average family size was 2.96.

In the town the population was spread out, with 26.7% under the age of 18, 8.2% from 18 to 24, 29.7% from 25 to 44, 22.5% from 45 to 64, and 12.9% who were 65 years of age or older. The median age was 35 years. For every 100 females, there were 99.5 males. For every 100 females age 18 and over, there were 92.0 males.

The median income for a household in the town was $19,659, and the median income for a family was $21,625. Males had a median income of $22,083 versus $15,417 for females. The per capita income for the town was $9,671. About 25.2% of families and 32.3% of the population were below the poverty line, including 41.3% of those under age 18 and 20.5% of those age 65 or over.

== Education ==
Bunker R-III School District operates one elementary school and Bunker High School.

Bunker has a public library, a branch of the Reynolds County Library District.

== Notable people ==
- Mel Bay, a musician best known for his series of music education books

Hannah Harper, 2026 American Idol Winner.
