= Black River (Arkansas–Missouri) =

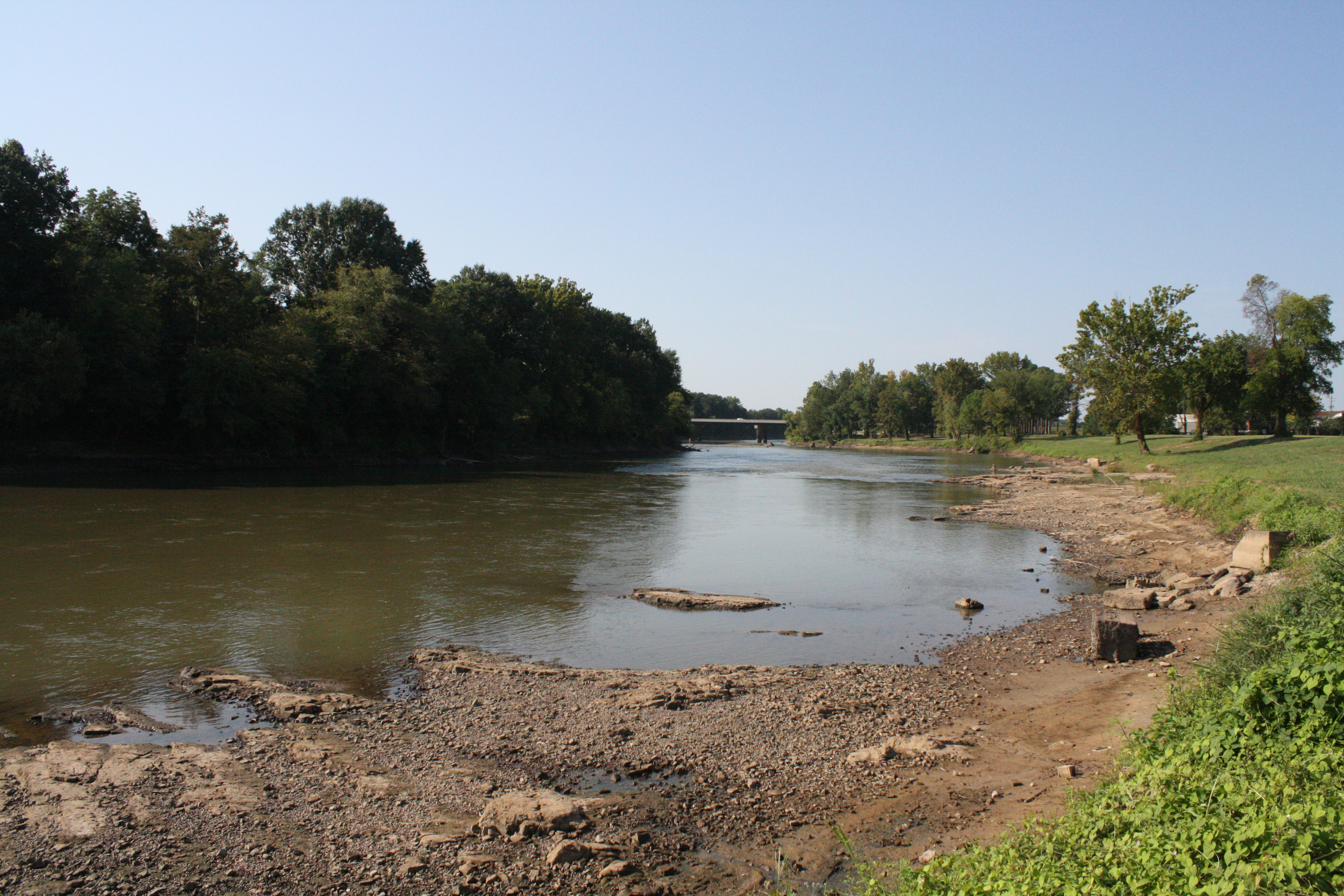
- Black River at Pocahontas, AR

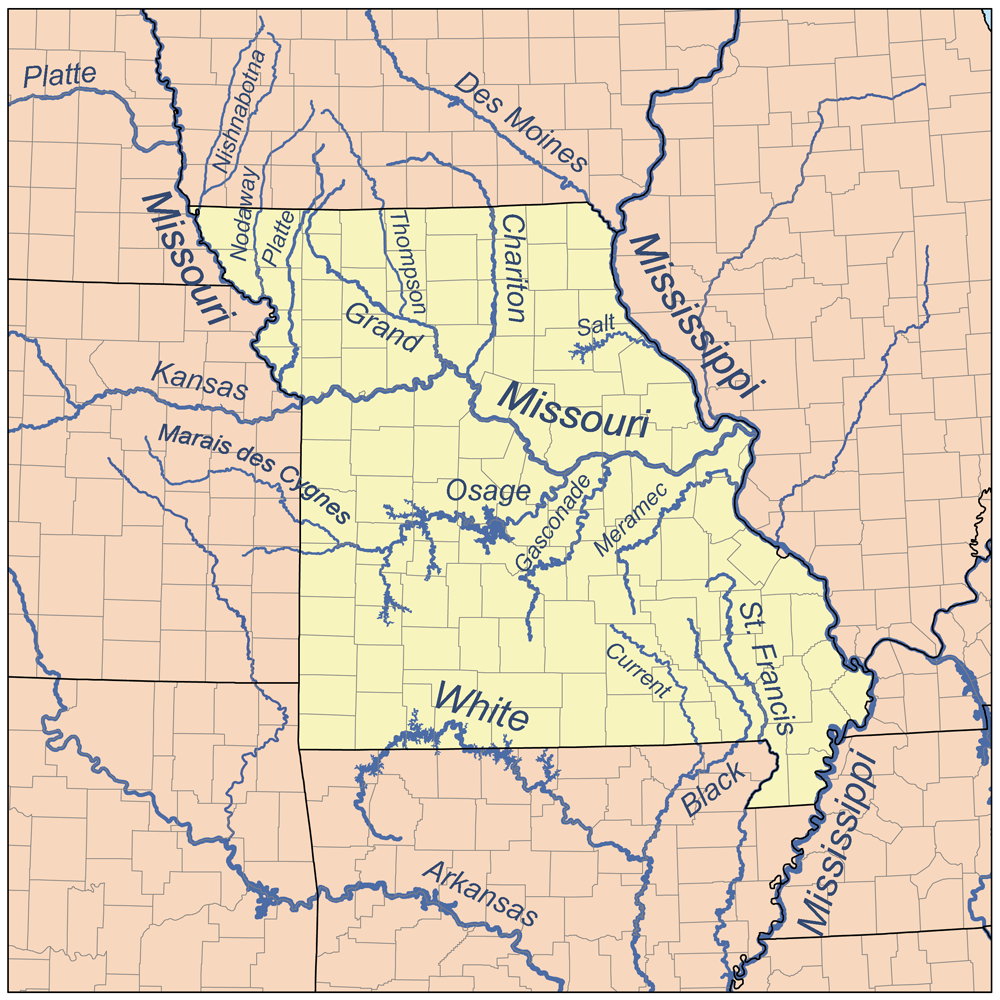
- Map of major Missouri rivers

Location
- Country: United States
- States: Arkansas, Missouri

Physical characteristics
- Source
  - location: Confluence of the East Fork and Middle Fork near Lesterville, Missouri
  - coordinates: 37°26′28″N 90°50′01″W
  - elevation: 640 ft (200 m)
- Mouth
  - location: Confluence with the White River northwest of Newport, Arkansas
  - coordinates: 35°38′24″N 91°19′18″W
  - elevation: 203 ft (62 m)
- Length: 300 mi (480 km)
- Discharge
  - location: Elgin Ferry, Arkansas
  - average: 10,367 cu/ft. per sec.

Basin features
- Progression: Black River → White → Mississippi → Gulf of Mexico
- GNIS ID: 66965

The Black River is a tributary of the White River, about 300 miles (480 km) long, in southeastern Missouri and northeastern Arkansas in the United States. Via the White River, it is part of the Mississippi River watershed. Black River Technical College is named for the river.

The river was so named on account of the black tint of its water.

== Headwaters and course ==
The Black River rises in Missouri as three streams:

- The East Fork Black River rises in Iron County and flows generally southwardly, through Johnson's Shut-Ins State Park where the Taum Sauk pumped storage plant Upper Reservoir dam breach caused severe damage to the park. A dam on the East Fork forms the Taum Sauk Lower Reservoir which holds water that is pumped to the Upper Reservoir.
- The Middle Fork Black River is formed by a confluence of creeks in the Mark Twain National Forest in northern Reynolds County and flows generally southeastwardly.
- The West Fork Black River is formed by a confluence of creeks in the Mark Twain National Forest in western Reynolds County and flows generally eastwardly, past the town of Centerville.

The headwaters forks converge near Lesterville, and the Black River flows generally southwardly through Reynolds, Wayne and Butler Counties in Missouri; and Clay, Randolph and Lawrence Counties in Arkansas. In its lowermost course the river is used to define the boundary between Independence and Jackson Counties. It flows past the towns of Mill Spring, Williamsville and Poplar Bluff in Missouri; and Pocahontas, Black Rock, and Powhatan in Arkansas. It joins the White River at Jacksonport, Arkansas.

== Dams ==
A U.S. Army Corps of Engineers dam in Wayne County, Missouri, causes the river to form Clearwater Lake.

== Tributaries ==
In Arkansas, the Black River is joined by the Little Black River, the Current River, the Spring River and the Strawberry River. Various creeks, including Mayberry Branch, Funk Branch, Mill Spring Creek, Knox Branch and Eads Creek, are tributaries in Missouri.

== See also ==
- List of Arkansas rivers
- List of Missouri rivers
