= Reynolds County, Missouri =

County in Missouri, United States

- County
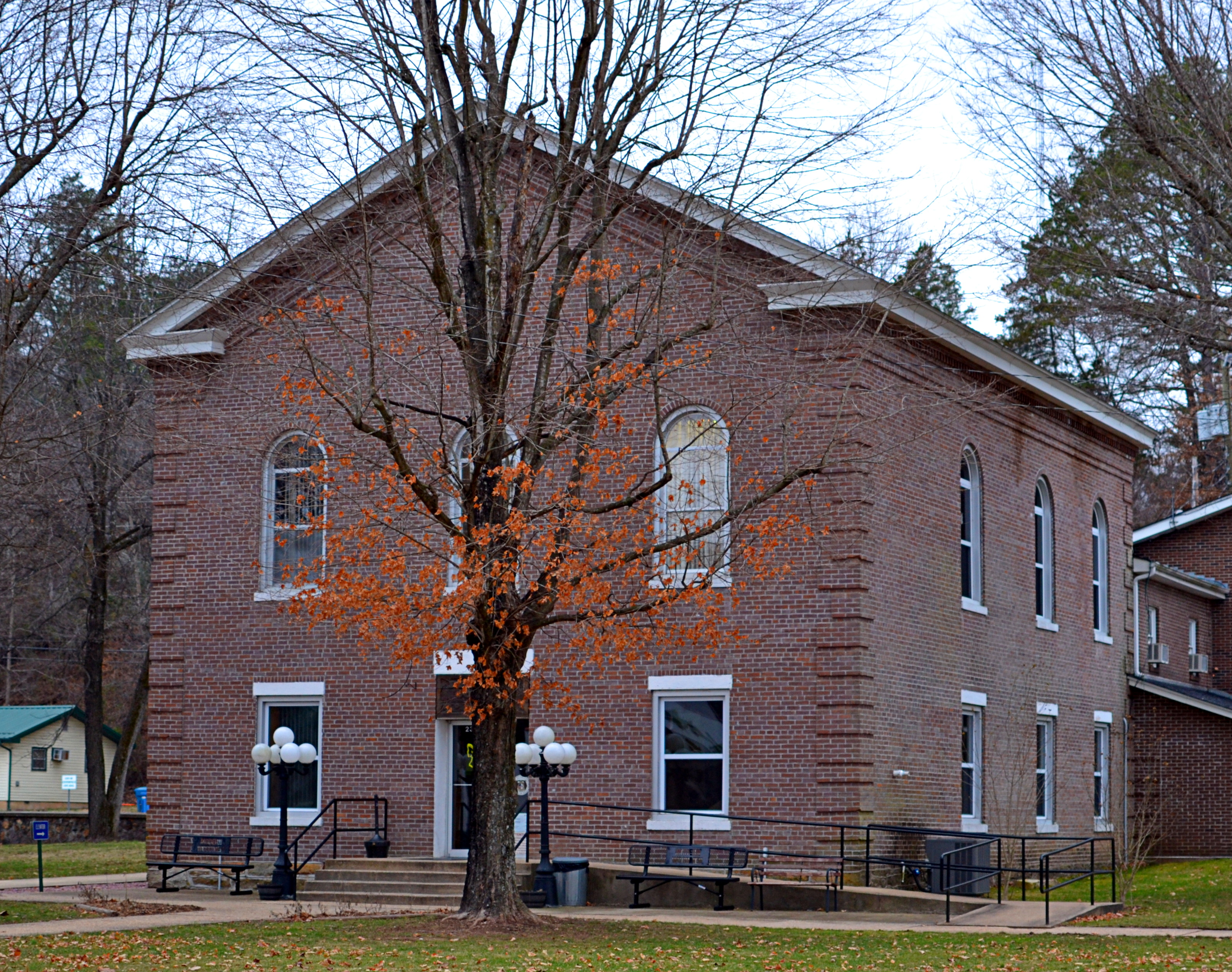
- The antebellum county courthouse in Centerville

- Location within the U.S. state of Missouri
- Coordinates: 37°22′N 90°58′W
- Country: United States
- State: Missouri
- Founded: February 25, 1845; 180 years ago
- Named for: Thomas Reynolds
- Seat: Centerville
- Largest city: Ellington

Area
  - Total: 814 sq mi (2,110 km^{2})
  - Land: 808 sq mi (2,090 km^{2})
  - Water: 5.9 sq mi (15 km^{2}) 0.7%

Population (2020)
  - Total: 6,096
  - Estimate (2025): 5,992 ▼
  - Density: 7.54/sq mi (2.91/km^{2})
- Time zone: UTC−6 (Central)
  - Summer (DST): UTC−5 (CDT)
- Congressional district: 8th

Reynolds County is a county located in the Ozark Foothills Region in the Lead Belt of Missouri. As of the 2020 census, the population was 6,096. Its county seat is Centerville. The county was officially organized on February 25, 1845, and was named in honor of former Governor of Missouri Thomas Reynolds.

The county is home to Johnson's Shut-Ins State Park, a popular tourist attraction in the state of Missouri.

== History ==
Reynolds County was officially organized on February 25, 1845. It is still an area of rugged beauty near the geologic center of the Ozark Highland. Reynolds County was formerly part of Ripley County which was formed in 1831 and part of Wayne County which was formed in 1818. It was also previously part of Washington County and part of Ste. Genevieve County.

The Reynolds County Courthouse has burned twice. The first time was in December 1863 when the Confederate army burned it. A new courthouse was built in the fall of 1867 on the same foundation as the previous one. This courthouse was burned in late November 1871. Both times all records were destroyed. Temporary quarters again burned May 27, 1872, while a new "fireproof" courthouse was being built.

== Geography ==
According to the U.S. Census Bureau, the county has a total area of 814 square miles (2,110 km^{2}), of which 808 square miles (2,090 km^{2}) is land and 5.9 square miles (15 km^{2}) (0.7%) is water.

=== Adjacent counties ===
- Dent County (northwest)
- Iron County (northeast)
- Wayne County (southeast)
- Carter County (south)
- Shannon County (west)

=== Major highways ===
- Route 21
- Route 49
- Route 72
- Route 106

=== National protected area ===
- Mark Twain National Forest (part)

=== Geographical features ===
- Robinson Hollow
- Pogue Hollow

== Demographics ==
Historical population
Census	Pop.	Note	%±
1850	1,849		—
1860	3,173		71.6%
1870	3,756		18.4%
1880	5,722		52.3%
1890	6,803		18.9%
1900	8,161		20.0%
1910	9,592		17.5%
1920	10,106		5.4%
1930	8,923		−11.7%
1940	9,370		5.0%
1950	6,918		−26.2%
1960	5,161		−25.4%
1970	6,106		18.3%
1980	7,230		18.4%
1990	6,661		−7.9%
2000	6,689		0.4%
2010	6,696		0.1%
2020	6,096		−9.0%
2025 (est.)	5,992	▼	−1.7%
U.S. Decennial Census; 1790-1960 1900-1990; 1990-2000 2010-2015

=== 2020 census ===
As of the 2020 census, the county had a population of 6,096. The median age was 46.7 years, 21.4% of residents were under the age of 18, and 23.9% of residents were 65 years of age or older. For every 100 females there were 104.2 males, and for every 100 females age 18 and over there were 101.9 males.

The racial makeup of the county was 93.3% White, 0.6% Black or African American, 0.5% American Indian and Alaska Native, 0.4% Asian, 0.0% Native Hawaiian and Pacific Islander, 0.3% from some other race, and 4.8% from two or more races. Hispanic or Latino residents of any race comprised 1.6% of the population.

The 2020 census racial composition counts are shown in the table below.

Reynolds County, Missouri – Racial and ethnic composition Note: the US Census treats Hispanic/Latino as an ethnic category. This table excludes Latinos from the racial categories and assigns them to a separate category. Hispanics/Latinos may be of any race.
Race / Ethnicity (NH = Non-Hispanic)	Pop 1980	Pop 1990	Pop 2000	Pop 2010	Pop 2020	% 1980	% 1990	% 2000	% 2010	% 2020
White alone (NH)	7,167	6,613	6,366	6,433	5,669	99.13%	99.28%	95.17%	96.07%	93.00%
Black or African American alone (NH)	2	3	32	45	33	0.03%	0.05%	0.48%	0.67%	0.54%
Native American or Alaska Native alone (NH)	11	14	86	37	23	0.15%	0.21%	1.29%	0.55%	0.38%
Asian alone (NH)	5	2	13	12	18	0.07%	0.03%	0.19%	0.18%	0.30%
Native Hawaiian or Pacific Islander alone (NH)	x	x	0	1	2	x	x	0.00%	0.01%	0.03%
Other race alone (NH)	4	1	3	1	0	0.06%	0.02%	0.04%	0.01%	0.00%
Mixed race or Multiracial (NH)	x	x	134	103	252	x	x	2.00%	1.54%	4.13%
Hispanic or Latino (any race)	41	28	55	64	99	0.57%	0.42%	0.82%	0.96%	1.62%
Total	7,230	6,661	6,689	6,696	6,096	100.00%	100.00%	100.00%	100.00%	100.00%

0.0% of residents lived in urban areas, while 100.0% lived in rural areas.

There were 2,475 households in the county, of which 26.1% had children under the age of 18 living with them and 22.1% had a female householder with no spouse or partner present. About 29.5% of all households were made up of individuals and 16.1% had someone living alone who was 65 years of age or older.

There were 3,461 housing units, of which 28.5% were vacant. Among occupied housing units, 76.9% were owner-occupied and 23.1% were renter-occupied. The homeowner vacancy rate was 2.0% and the rental vacancy rate was 11.3%.

=== 2000 census ===
As of the 2000 census, there were 6,689 people, 2,721 households, and 1,915 families residing in the county. The population density was 8 people per square mile (3.1 people/km^{2}). There were 3,759 housing units at an average density of 5 units per square mile (1.9/km^{2}). The racial makeup of the county was 95.65% White, 0.52% Black or African American, 1.29% Native American, 0.19% Asian, 0.21% from other races, and 2.14% from two or more races. Approximately 0.82% of the population were Hispanic or Latino of any race. Among the major first ancestries reported in Reynolds County were 37.6% American, 12.1% Irish, 11.6% German, and 11.4% English.

There were 2,721 households, out of which 27.80% had children under the age of 18 living with them, 59.20% were married couples living together, 7.80% had a female householder with no husband present, and 29.60% were non-families. 26.00% of all households were made up of individuals, and 11.10% had someone living alone who was 65 years of age or older. The average household size was 2.40 and the average family size was 2.85.

In the county, the population was spread out, with 24.00% under the age of 18, 6.80% from 18 to 24, 25.00% from 25 to 44, 27.90% from 45 to 64, and 16.20% who were 65 years of age or older. The median age was 41 years. For every 100 females there were 101.60 males. For every 100 females age 18 and over, there were 98.60 males.

The median income for a household in the county was $31,546, and the median income for a family was $37,891. Males had a median income of $26,753 versus $18,322 for females. The per capita income for the county was $15,847. About 16.10% of families and 20.10% of the population were below the poverty line, including 25.90% of those under age 18 and 15.50% of those age 65 or over.

=== Religion ===
According to the Association of Religion Data Archives County Membership Report (2000), Reynolds County is a part of the Bible Belt with evangelical Protestantism being the majority religion. The most predominant denominations among residents in Reynolds County who adhere to a religion are Southern Baptists (78.80%), Baptist Missionary Association of America (8.24%), and Methodists (4.24%).

== Politics ==
=== Local ===
The Republican Party has the most elected officials at the local level in Reynolds.

Reynolds County, Missouri

Elected countywide officials
Assessor	Rick Parker	Democratic
Circuit Clerk	Brandi Freeman	Republican
County Clerk	Alicia Baker	Republican
Collector	Denise Smith	Republican
Commissioner (presiding)	Steve Chitwood	Republican
Commissioner (district 1)	Larry Pogue Jr.	Democratic
Commissioner (district 2)	Eddie Williams	Republican
Coroner	Jeffrey N. McSpadden	Republican
Prosecuting Attorney	Bradley VanZee	Republican
Public Administrator	Robyn Gray	Republican
Recorder	Myra Turner	Democratic
Sheriff	Caleb McCoy	Republican
Treasurer	Wanda Corder	Democratic

=== State ===
Reynolds County is divided into two legislative districts in the Missouri House of Representatives, both of which are held by Republicans.

- District 143 — Currently represented by Jeffrey Pogue (R-Salem), consists of the extreme northwestern parts of the county and includes the town of Bunker.

Missouri House of Representatives — District 143 — Reynolds County (2016)
Party	Candidate	Votes	%	±%
Republican	Jeffrey Pogue	287	100.00%	

Missouri House of Representatives — District 143 — Reynolds County (2014)
Party	Candidate	Votes	%	±%
Republican	Jeffrey Pogue	161	100.00%	+36.44

Missouri House of Representatives — District 143 — Reynolds County (2012)
Party	Candidate	Votes	%	±%
Republican	Jeffrey Pogue	225	63.56%	
Democratic	Shane Van Steenis	129	36.44%	

- District 144 — Currently represented by Paul Fitzwater (R-Potosi), consists of most of the entire county and includes Ellington, Lesterville and Centerville.

Missouri House of Representatives — District 144 — Reynolds County (2016)
Party	Candidate	Votes	%	±%
Republican	Paul Fitzwater	2,266	100.00%	

Missouri House of Representatives — District 144 — Reynolds County (2014)
Party	Candidate	Votes	%	±%
Republican	Paul Fitzwater	1,167	100.00%	+36.75

Missouri House of Representatives — District 144 — Reynolds County (2012)
Party	Candidate	Votes	%	±%
Republican	Paul Fitzwater	1,761	63.25%	
Democratic	Michael L. Jackson	1,023	36.75%	

All of Reynolds County is a part of the 3rd District in the Missouri Senate and is currently represented by Gary Romine (R-Farmington).

Missouri Senate — District 3 — Reynolds County (2016)
Party	Candidate	Votes	%	±%
Republican	Gary Romine	2,308	86.73%	+26.93
Green	Edward R. Weissler	353	13.27%	+13.27

Missouri Senate — District 3 — Reynolds County (2012)
Party	Candidate	Votes	%	±%
Republican	Gary Romine	1,791	59.80%	
Democratic	Joseph Fallert, Jr.	1,204	40.20%	

Past gubernatorial elections results
Year	Republican	Democratic	Third Parties
2024	82.09% 2,424	15.81% 467	2.10% 62
2020	77.72% 2,501	19.67% 633	2.61% 84
2016	66.30% 1,969	29.59% 879	4.11% 122
2012	39.43% 1,239	57.13% 1,795	3.44% 108
2008	37.73% 1,223	58.65% 1,901	3.61% 117
2004	53.61% 1,746	45.13% 1,470	1.25% 41
2000	46.29% 1,416	48.38% 1,480	5.33% 163
1996	30.81% 886	66.93% 1,925	2.26% 65
1992	32.39% 1,034	67.61% 2,158	0.00% 0
1988	50.45% 1,528	49.19% 1,490	0.36% 11
1984	39.46% 1,308	60.54% 2,007	0.00% 0
1980	43.02% 1,389	56.89% 1,837	0.09% 3
1976	39.71% 1,175	60.19% 1,781	0.10% 3

=== Federal ===
United States presidential election results for Reynolds County, Missouri
Year	Republican		Democratic		Third party(ies)	
Year	No.	%	No.	%	No.	%
1888	259	23.06%	862	76.76%	2	0.18%
1892	281	23.55%	903	75.69%	9	0.75%
1896	385	27.44%	1,015	72.34%	3	0.21%
1900	451	30.45%	1,027	69.35%	3	0.20%
1904	505	36.23%	877	62.91%	12	0.86%
1908	544	33.13%	1,052	64.07%	46	2.80%
1912	367	22.19%	1,030	62.27%	257	15.54%
1916	592	32.02%	1,209	65.39%	48	2.60%
1920	1,173	38.51%	1,837	60.31%	36	1.18%
1924	873	32.05%	1,822	66.89%	29	1.06%
1928	1,247	43.99%	1,582	55.80%	6	0.21%
1932	792	24.35%	2,439	75.00%	21	0.65%
1936	915	26.94%	2,476	72.91%	5	0.15%
1940	1,187	32.97%	2,406	66.83%	7	0.19%
1944	951	33.57%	1,877	66.25%	5	0.18%
1948	692	25.18%	2,050	74.60%	6	0.22%
1952	949	30.82%	2,124	68.98%	6	0.19%
1956	917	36.49%	1,596	63.51%	0	0.00%
1960	1,139	52.18%	1,044	47.82%	0	0.00%
1964	530	22.41%	1,835	77.59%	0	0.00%
1968	898	34.79%	1,245	48.24%	438	16.97%
1972	1,541	59.91%	1,031	40.09%	0	0.00%
1976	879	29.01%	2,143	70.73%	8	0.26%
1980	1,271	39.11%	1,919	59.05%	60	1.85%
1984	1,330	39.63%	2,026	60.37%	0	0.00%
1988	1,162	38.29%	1,864	61.42%	9	0.30%
1992	776	23.34%	2,014	60.57%	535	16.09%
1996	903	30.51%	1,631	55.10%	426	14.39%
2000	1,762	56.28%	1,298	41.46%	71	2.27%
2004	1,896	56.36%	1,449	43.07%	19	0.56%
2008	1,782	54.21%	1,418	43.14%	87	2.65%
2012	1,931	60.31%	1,157	36.13%	114	3.56%
2016	2,406	79.20%	540	17.77%	92	3.03%
2020	2,733	82.87%	529	16.04%	36	1.09%
2024	2,560	83.69%	472	15.43%	27	0.88%

U.S. Senate — Missouri — Reynolds County (2016)
Party	Candidate	Votes	%	±%
Republican	Roy Blunt	1,780	60.56%	+21.17
Democratic	Jason Kander	1,009	34.33%	−19.37
Libertarian	Jonathan Dine	71	2.42%	−4.50
Green	Johnathan McFarland	41	1.40%	+1.40
Constitution	Fred Ryman	38	1.29%	+1.29

U.S. Senate — Missouri — Reynolds County (2012)
Party	Candidate	Votes	%	±%
Republican	Todd Akin	1,247	39.39%	
Democratic	Claire McCaskill	1,700	53.70%	
Libertarian	Jonathan Dine	219	6.92%	

Reynolds County is included in Missouri's 8th Congressional District and is currently represented by Jason T. Smith (R-Salem) in the U.S. House of Representatives. Smith won a special election on Tuesday, June 4, 2013, to finish out the remaining term of U.S. Representative Jo Ann Emerson (R-Cape Girardeau). Emerson announced her resignation a month after being reelected with over 70 percent of the vote in the district. She resigned to become CEO of the National Rural Electric Cooperative.

U.S. House of Representatives — Missouri's 8th Congressional District — Reynolds County (2016)
Party	Candidate	Votes	%	±%
Republican	Jason T. Smith	2,236	77.34%	+11.95
Democratic	Dave Cowell	587	20.30%	−6.20
Libertarian	Jonathan Shell	68	2.35%	+1.07

U.S. House of Representatives — Missouri's 8th Congressional District — Reynolds County (2014)
Party	Candidate	Votes	%	±%
Republican	Jason T. Smith	1,024	65.39%	+15.31
Democratic	Barbara Stocker	415	26.50%	−3.62
Libertarian	Rick Vandeven	20	1.28	−0.02
Constitution	Doug Enyart	54	3.45%	+3.45
Independent	Terry Hampton	53	3.38%	+3.38

U.S. House of Representatives — Missouri's 8th Congressional District — Reynolds County (Special Election 2013)
Party	Candidate	Votes	%	±%
Republican	Jason T. Smith	451	64.99%	−7.85
Democratic	Steve Hodges	209	30.12%	+5.14
Constitution	Doug Enyart	25	3.60%	+3.60
Libertarian	Bill Slantz	9	1.30%	−0.88

U.S. House of Representatives — Missouri's 8th Congressional District — Reynolds County (2012)
Party	Candidate	Votes	%	±%
Republican	Jo Ann Emerson	2,301	72.84%	
Democratic	Jack Rushin	789	24.98%	
Libertarian	Rick Vandeven	69	2.18%	

==== Political culture ====
At the presidential level, Reynolds County was a Democratic stronghold from its founding in 1845 through 1996; its only Republican votes (or indeed votes for any but the Democratic nominee) in this period were for Richard Nixon in 1960 and then again for Nixon in his 1972 landslide. In 2000, George W. Bush carried the county for the Republican Party for only the third time ever, despite his narrow national popular vote defeat that year. The county has voted Republican in every subsequent election as of 2020, with the Republican vote share declining only in 2008. The Republican vote share has not been held below 60% since 2008.

Like most rural areas throughout Southeast Missouri, voters in Reynolds County generally adhere to socially and culturally conservative principles but are more moderate or populist on economic issues, typical of the Dixiecrat philosophy. In 2004, Missourians voted on a constitutional amendment to define marriage as the union between a man and a woman—it overwhelmingly passed Reynolds County with 85.41 percent of the vote. The initiative passed the state with 71 percent of support from voters as Missouri became the first state to ban same-sex marriage. In 2006, Missourians voted on a constitutional amendment to fund and legalize embryonic stem cell research in the state—it failed in Reynolds County with 54.15 percent voting against the measure. The initiative narrowly passed the state with 51 percent of support from voters as Missouri became one of the first states in the nation to approve embryonic stem cell research. Despite Reynolds County's longstanding tradition of supporting socially conservative platforms, voters in the county have a penchant for advancing populist causes like increasing the minimum wage. In 2006, Missourians voted on a proposition (Proposition B) to increase the minimum wage in the state to $6.50 an hour—it passed Reynolds County with 77.50 percent of the vote. The proposition strongly passed every single county in Missouri with 75.94 percent voting in favor as the minimum wage was increased to $6.50 an hour in the state. During the same election, voters in five other states also strongly approved increases in the minimum wage.

=== Missouri presidential preference primary (2008) ===
In the 2008 presidential primary, voters in Reynolds County from both political parties supported candidates who finished in second place in the state at large and nationally. Former U.S. Senator Hillary Clinton (D-New York) received more votes, a total of 741, than any candidate from either party in Reynolds County during the 2008 presidential primary. She also received more votes than the total number of votes cast in the entire Republican Primary in Reynolds County.

== Education ==
Of adults 25 years of age and older in Reynolds County, 40.4% possesses a high school diploma or higher while 10.0% holds a bachelor's degree or higher as their highest educational attainment.

=== Public schools ===
- Bunker R-III School District - Bunker
  - Bunker Elementary School (K-06)
  - Bunker High School (07-12)
- Centerville R-I School District - Centerville
  - Centerville Elementary School (K-08)
- Lesterville R-IV School District - Lesterville
  - Lesterville Elementary School (K-06)
  - Lesterville High School (07-12)
  - Lesterville Ranch Campus (K-12) - Black
- Southern Reynolds County R-II School District - Ellington
  - Southern Reynolds County Elementary School (PK-05)
  - Southern Reynolds County High School (06-12)

=== Public libraries ===
- Reynolds County Library District

== Communities ==
=== Cities ===
- Bunker
- Centerville (county seat)
- Ellington

=== Unincorporated communities ===
- Bee Fork
- Black
- Chitwood
- Corridon
- Dagonia
- Edgehill
- Exchange
- Fruit City
- Garwood
- Greeley
- Hadley
- Lesterville
- Monterey
- Munger
- Oates
- Ohlman
- Redford
- Reynolds
- Ruble
- Smithboro
- West Fork

== See also ==
- National Register of Historic Places listings in Reynolds County, Missouri
