= Firmin Desloge =

Firmin Desloge may refer to:

- Firmin René Desloge (1803–1856), American industrialist
- Firmin V. Desloge (1843–1929), American industrialist, son of Firmin René Desloge

== See also ==
- Firmin Desloge Hospital, St. Louis, Missouri
- Desloge family
