= Ste. Genevieve Academy =

The Ste. Genevieve Academy was a school in Ste. Genevieve, Missouri. The first publicly chartered school in the Louisiana Territory, it is now a contributing property within the Ste. Genevieve National Historic Landmark District.

== Documentary history ==
The early French settlers of the town, led by their cosmopolitan Irish pastor, maintained a detailed journal that outlined the activities of the academy's trustees from its early planning stages in 1807 through the construction, operation, and the closing of the school in 1861.

General Firmin A. Rozier and his children lived in the Old Academy from 1862 until Tom Rozier's death in the late 1930s. They maintained the mansion as a museum, preserving hundreds of documents for the historic record. Most of this documentary evidence found its way into the hands of the building's caretakers.

== Beginnings ==
A list of financial backers or 'subscribers' was compiled by Father James Maxwell in July 1807 to establish the first school publicly charted by the government of the Louisiana Territory. This list of subscribers included the Chouteau family of St. Louis as well as the leading families of Ste. Genevieve, New Bourbon, and the lead mining districts around present day Ironton, Missouri. These wealthy families promised to pay $1,904 in cash and $814 in materials for the "building of a suitable house for an Academy" to be located in the Town of Ste. Genevieve.

The first meeting of the subscribers took place at the home of Joseph Pratte in Ste. Genevieve, Saturday, September 26, 1807. A 21-member Board of Trustees was elected from this group and a constitution was created to govern the future "Louisiana Academy". Father James Maxwell was chosen chairman of the Academy's Board of Trustees. President Thomas Jefferson appointed the Catholic priest to the Louisiana Territory's first Legislative Assembly. Maxwell later presided over its first session.

In his capacity as Curate of Ste. Genevieve and Vicar General of Upper Louisiana, Reverend Maxwell made frequent visits to St. Louis. Maxwell's home was in New Bourbon and he regularly visited the mining districts further south.

The concept of an Academy teaching both English and French in a French-speaking territory was Maxwell's work. If his congregation was to thrive under the United States government it was imperative that its children learn to conduct business in the English language. This was the central purpose of Maxwell's Academy. It is also likely that Maxwell inserted into the constitution the Jeffersonian concept of educating the poor and Indian children alongside the sons of the great planters and merchants. No other person in Upper Louisiana had the universal prestige to garner support for such a scheme and carry the concept through to fruition.

=== Plans to construct new building ===
In December 1807, the inaugural meeting of the trustees of the Louisiana Academy took place at the home of Joseph Pratte. By the following January, the trustees had appointed a committee to prepare architectural plans for the construction of a "suitable building" and also make initial inquiries as to a possible building site. This committee consisted of Maxwell, Pratte, and Judge Otho Shrader.

The trustees requested that the United States government provide them with suitable land for their proposed school. When Congress failed to act, the trustees purchased four arpents of land near the town of Ste. Genevieve from John Price for the sum of $100. The property was situated outside the northwest boundary of the town on a hilltop, which enjoys a panoramic view of Ste. Genevieve, the Mississippi River, and the surrounding countryside.

The land the trustees acquired was originally owned by Louis Champaigne. There was serious concern regarding the possibility of a clouded title. Maxwell resolved this issue by personally warranting the title against all claims except that of the United States government. Thus, by March 1808, the way was finally cleared for breaking ground.

Maxwell was the driving force behind the development of this school. He decided the setting and style of the academy building. Maxwell had been born and reared in 18th-century Ireland and educated at the University of Salamanca, in Spain.

==== Challenges securing funds ====
The trustees meeting of March 1808 determined that funds thus far collected from the subscribers were not sufficient for the construction of a two-story stone house measuring 50 ft. long by 25 ft. wide. A plan was adopted to reduce the size of the initial construction to 31 ft. by 25 ft. and enlarge the building to 50 ft. by 25 ft. when more funds were available. The treasurer was instructed by the trustees to call upon each subscriber to pay one-half their pledged contribution immediately and the balance within three months. The continued operation of this school was threatened for years to come by collection difficulties.

Plans for the academy and the use of stone in construction were unanimously approved by the trustees in March 1808. The building site was selected by Maxwell, Timothy Phelps, and Vital St. Gemme Beauvais. Blue limestone was only available from the mine developed by the French army east of Fort de Chartres. This mine supplied the huge quantities of stone required for building of the stone fort in 1751. Evidence suggests that the stone used in construction was salvaged on flatboats from the ruins of Fort de Chartres, which was abandoned in 1772. After the great flood of 1785, Fort de Chartres lay in complete ruins. Mountains of free building materials were available for the taking. Ox carts could easily carry the salvaged stone from the flatboats up academy hill to the building site less than one-half mile from the levee.

==== Updated plans ====
At the May 1808 meeting of the trustees, the building committee, chartered by Maxwell, reported that the plan to build only two-thirds of the building now and later complete the task was unwise. It was determined that: "by adding a new wall to the one that was some time before build will in course shrink below the old work and thereby ruin the whole." As a result, the trustees voted unanimously to "carry u"' the whole building but "only cover that part of the building that was designed to be completed at a future day."

Since dendrochronology dates all of the first floor joists to 1808, it is assumed that two rooms of the Academy's second floor remained somewhat unfinished until the repairs of 1818 and the reopening of the academy by the French Christian Brothers.

=== Public charter ===
The Louisiana Territorial Legislature unanimously approved the incorporation of a charter creating the Ste. Genevieve Academy on June 21, 1808, making the school the first public institution of higher education created in the Louisiana Territory. It is also the first school incorporated by the United States west of the Mississippi.

The Act of Incorporation was passed in the final year of Jefferson's second term. It reflects many of Jefferson's ideals. However, because of financial restraints and the premature death of the school's founde, they were never completely enacted.

== Construction ==
On August 3, 1808, William Shannon, a trustee of the academy, and a builder by trade, signed a contract to build the academy. Shannon had also been born and reared in Ireland. The architectural style of the scademy building was under the total control and influence of Maxwell and Shannon. The academy was constructed in the new Federal style and it also shows an influence from the Irish country houses of their day.

The construction contract signed by Shannon calls for: "the whole of mason work on said Academy to be completely finished, in a workman like manner by the first day of December next."

The Trustees agreed to pay $900 to William Shannon for the masonry work. This reflected the cost of labor only, for the trustees supplied all of the materials. One-half of Shannon's payment was to be in cash and the balance in lead at the current rate of exchange. Shannon was to receive one-half of the payment two months after work commenced and the remaining balance upon completion of the project.

In December 1808, the academy board of trustees authorized the board's collector to receive lead from subscribers in lieu of cash at the rate of $5 per one hundred pounds, if the lead was paid to the collector within ten days. However, another eighteen months passed before sufficient funds were available to pay Shannon for the remainder of his fee.

=== 1809 Smallpox epidemic ===
Several months later, a smallpox epidemic swept through Ste. Genevieve. It was believed that the disease was brought in town from infected persons on flatboats traveling the Mississippi and docking in town. By 1802, smallpox vaccination was available in Ste. Genevieve. Very few people took advantage and were vaccinated. As a result, the disease ravaged the town and delayed the opening of the academy. Nevertheless, on August 30, 1809, the trustees authorized the collector of the Town of Ste. Genevieve to file suit against subscribers who had not made full payment in "money, lead, or produce".

=== Further financial difficulties ===
There is evidence that Maxwell completed work on the Academy not approved by the board of trustees and personally guaranteed payment. On March 1, 1810, the trustees heard the auditor's reports and found that the accounts of the building committee, chaired by Maxwell, were in a shambles. Maxwell had ordered finishing work on the academy that had not been approved by the board and had given his personal guarantee for payment. This was against the bylaws of the board of trustees and it was adopted that from that moment forward a strict enforcement of financial procedures would be observed. It is doubtful that Maxwell paid any heed to this directive. The board's only recourse was to collect past due subscriber accounts. George Bullett, a trustee, was appointed to collect accounts in the lead mining districts, and Elias Austin Elliott was appointed to complete a similar task in St. Louis.

Daniel Barry was approved by the trustees to preside as teacher of the Ste. Genevieve Academy on April 24, 1810. Barry agreed to: "undertake to teach English, French, Latin, Greek, Mathematics, Arithmetic, Surveying, Logic, Metaphysics, Geography, History, Natural and Moral Philosophy, agreeably to a prospectus already exhibited; for the sum of 1,100 dollars for the first year ye will superintend the education of 45 students.

It appears that Barry left after one year because on March 20, 1811, the board of trustees examined the qualifications of a Mr. Curtis as teacher for the academy. The board found nothing against Mr. Curtis' character, but felt he was not qualified to teach the different branches of education demanded by the trustees.

At their March 20, 1811 meeting the trustees also examined Shannon's claim against them for past due payments for the completion of the academy building. The board agreed to reimburse Shannon for "all the monies he has expended in completing the building". The building committee determined the total amount due Shannon was $151.82. At this point, Shannon was paid in full for construction of the academy. However, many outstanding debts still remained unpaid to other creditors.

== Appointment of Mann Butler ==
On January 24, 1812, Mann Butler, was recommended for the position of principal teacher of the Ste. Genevieve Academy. Although the 1811–12 New Madrid earthquakes had devastated the region south of Ste. Genevieve, no mention of damage to the at this meeting of the Trustees. Therefore, it appears the academy withstood the earthquake shocks without appreciable harm to its structure or contents.

Mann Butler was born in Baltimore, Maryland. He spent 11 years of his childhood in England and returned at age 14 to the United States in 1798. Butler studied at St. Mary's College in Washington D.C. where he received degrees in medicine and law. In 1806, he moved to Lexington, Kentucky, where he briefly practiced law before beginning his career as an educator. Late in 1806, he founded an academy in Versailles, Kentucky and married Martha Dedman. From 1810 through 1811, Butler taught in Washington and Maysville, Kentucky.

On January 31, 1812, Butler became the "Principal-Teacher" of the Ste. Genevieve Academy. However, difficulty in collecting tuition once again left the trustees short of funds for the teacher's salary. John Scott, trustee, was appointed by the board on June 27, 1812, to call on all the parents of the children who failed to pay their tuition and fees. If they failed to do so immediately, their children were to be removed from the academy.

Butler remained at the academy until the close of the term in 1814. His departure was likely related to the accidental death of Maxwell, who was thrown from his horse on his way back to New Bourbon after hearing confessions at Ste. Genevieve Catholic Church. He was taken unconscious to the home of his friend, Joseph Pratte where he died the following day, May 28, 1814, at the age of 72.

== Challenges following the death of Father Maxwell ==
Creditors descended like vultures upon the Ste. Genevieve Academy following the unexpected death of its primary patron and founder, Father Maxwell. Their suits forced the sale of the academy building and its land at public auction. William Shannon placed the highest bid, purchasing the Academy for $390 on November 18, 1814.

=== Appointment of Father Louis DuBourg ===
Shortly before this sheriff's sale, Father Louis DuBourg was appointed the first Bishop of the Louisiana Territory and the Floridas by Archbishop Carroll of Baltimore, August 18, 1814. DuBourg traveled to Rome in 1815 where he was consecrated Bishop of Louisiana and the Floridas. The opening of schools in his frontier diocese was a primary concern, which necessitated the recruitment of teachers. DuBourg and his entourage engaged in an eighteen-month extended tour of France and Belgium in a was for members of religious orders willing to volunteer for service in the mission parishes and schools of the Louisiana Territory.

DuBourg made a request to the Superior General of the Christian Brothers; Brother Gerbaud initially refused the request. The French Revolution of 1789 had resulted in the disbursement of this order and the execution of many of its members. The Bourbon restoration had only been in place for three years at the time of this request and the Christian Brothers Institute in France had only just begun a slow recovery. However, DuBourg was not a man to take no for an answer. He asked for, and received the assistance of the Vatican Curia and the Pope. Pius VII immediately sent a request to the Superior General of the Christian Brothers on behalf of DuBourg: 'Our Venerable Brother William DuBourg recently consecrated here and named Bishop of New Orleans, ardently desires to bring with him some of your Brothers to instruct the youth of his vast diocese. We earnestly recommend this matter to you, and We desire that if you have some subjects who are willing to go there and whom you judge proper for this pious work, that you should send them if it can be done. This will be most agreeable to God and to Us.' Gerbaud relented and on April 20, 1816, composed a letter agreeing to give DuBourg the brothers requested.

Louis XVIII, King of France, gave DuBourg and his entourage free passage to America. The group consisted of five priests, two subdeacons, nine clerics, three Christian Brothers, four seminarians, and four workmen or mechanics. They departed from Bordeaux, July 1, 1817, on board La Caravane, a frigate of the French Royal Navy, and landed in Annapolis, Maryland two months later on September 4.

DuBourg had petitioned the Pope to allow him to establish his residence in St. Louis due to the "distressing conditions" and general riotous circumstances in New Orleans. He, therefore, traveled first to Baltimore, and then on to Pittsburgh, Louisville, and finally to Bardstown, Kentucky, where the three Christian Brothers remained to learn English and assist with the construction of a new seminary. DuBourg then traveled on to Ste. Genevieve and finally to his cathedral city of St. Louis.

== 1814 Closing of Academy ==
The death of Maxwell in 1814 had resulted in the closing of the Ste. Genevieve Academy. The academy had lost its charter when the building became the personal property of Shannon. Henry Pratte, a young priest who was born in Ste. Genevieve and educated at the College of Montreal, was selected to replace Maxwell as pastor of Ste. Genevieve. Pratte was the son of John-Baptiste Sylvester Pratte by his second wife Teresa and the half brother of Joseph Pratte, trustee of the academy. One of the first concerns of Pratte was to restore the academy to full operation.

Pratt asked DuBourg for a Christian Brother to teach in the school he intended to reopen at the academy. In a letter to Father Rosati, DuBourg's coadjutor, dated December 23, 1818, Pratte wrote: '"I have asked of the Bishop for a Brother to open school in Ste. Genevieve. He replied to me that I can have one, and he requests me to write you that paragraph from his letter. It is as follows: 'I have written recently to the Brothers that, if you ask for one, to send Brother Antonin who is best educated in English. Act accordingly and write to this effect to Mr. Rosati, giving him this paragraph from my letter. But, remember, you must take charge of everything, for I do not wish to be mixed up with the parents.'"

== 1818 Reopening of the Academy ==
June 13, 1818 a group of subscribers met at Colonel Valle's home on the northwest corner of Main and Market Streets. The meeting was chaired by Shannon who now owned the academy building and its surrounding land. The purpose of the meeting was to establish a seminary at the town of Ste. Genevieve. It was determined that the subscribers had collected sufficient money "to purchase the right of Mr. Shannon to the stone house called the Ste. Genevieve Academy".

Five days later, on June 18, 1818, Shannon sold the Academy and its four acres back to the trustees of the Ste. Genevieve Academy for $600. A committee was established to prepare and engage workmen for repairing and finishing the stone house.

Brother Antonin arrived in Ste. Genevieve in late December 1818. DuBourg stated in a letter to Rosati dated January 4, 1819 that "I am delighted that Brother Antonin is at Ste. Genevieve. I have received one of his letters and am sending the various things for which he asked."

With the opening of school January 8, 1819, the Ste. Genevieve Academy became the first school operated by the Christian Brothers in the United States. This was a Roman Catholic school maintained by the Catholic citizens of Upper Louisiana and was not operating under a charter from the Louisiana legislature. DuBourg had promised not to separate the three brothers, Brothers Fulgence and Aubin soon joined Brother Antonin at the Academy. The bishop had assured the Superior General of the Christian Brothers that the three would be kept together so as to be able observe a community life

Father Pratte died September 1, 1822, at the age of 34. The Christian Brothers had been operating the school for three years. DuBourg decided that this successful enterprise could be extended by separating the brothers and having each open an individual school. However, oly temporary vows, which had expired, caused all three to leave their religious order. Once again, the Ste. Genevieve Academy was closed and remained so for 32 years. Three decades passed, before anyone paid serious attention to the "old academy", as it was called in antebellum Ste. Genevieve.

"For many years prior to the year 1853 there stood on a hill west of the town an old dilapidated stone building called the Old Academy and known among river men as the haunted house - the residence of owls and bats of the neighboring woods. There seemed to be a strange fatality attendant on every attempt to fit up this house for the purposes of education; either the undertaking failed for want of means and was abandoned, or no permanent teacher could be obtained. Thus matter stood in the winter of 52 and 53. The house was tenanted by a few destitute families who were forced by necessity to seek shelter under its crumbling roof." Ste. Genevieve Plain Dealer July 1854

== Impact of Firmin Anthony Rozier ==
Firmin Anthony Rozier was the son of Jean Ferdinand Rozier, who had come to Ste. Genevieve the year the academy was built, with his partner John James Audubon. Ferdinand soon became one of the wealthiest men in Upper Louisiana through his thriving mercantile business. He brought his nephew, Firmin Desloge, from France and established him in the family business.

Firmin A. Rozier was born in Ste. Genevieve and became a true Victorian romantic. He attended St. Mary's College in Perryville, Missouri and then studied law under Colonel Lewis Bogy. Later Firmin graduated from Transylvania College in Lexington, Kentucky, where Mann Butler, once served as a professor.

In the 1840s it was fashionable for men of wealth to form and outfit militia companies. Firmin Rozier formed a militia company in 1845 and was appointed Brigadier General of the State Militia by Governor John C. Edwards of Missouri. Although "the General" never once led his men in action of any kind, he cherished the romantic ring of his title, and was called General Rozier for the remainder of his life.

On August 20, 1851, Firmin Rozier, while serving as Mayor of Ste. Genevieve, gave an address to the Board of Aldermen calling for the development of public schools.

=== Acquisition of the school ===
On March 6, 1849 the Missouri legislature created an act to incorporate the Trustees of the Ste. Genevieve Academy. Firmin A. Rozier, who had recently received his inheritance from his father, was actively pursuing the reopening of the old academy. Rozier had also just completed the building of the Plank Road from Ironton to the Ste. Genevieve Levee. This wooden causeway enabled ox carts to travel easily across country from Ironton with their immensely heavy cargos of lead bound for the Port of Ste. Genevieve.

"The General" was interested in personally acquiring the old academy and starting a school of his own design. On February 17, 1853, the Missouri Legislature enacted a law that repealed the Act of Incorporation of 1849. The 1853 act delineated how the trustees must compose a deed of conveyance for the sale of real estate. This cleared the path for Rozier to acquire the old academy as his personal property. On March 30, 1853, the trustees, conveyed the deed to the old academy to Rozier in exchange for his pledge to maintain a school on the premises for ten years and to admit, free of charge, 50 poor children for one year each, over a three-year period.

Two days later on April 2, 1853, Rozier signed a construction contract to add a 50 ft. by 25 ft. two-story brick addition to the old academy. The contract was given to John Troll, Joseph Jokurst, and Charles Jokurst. It called for the work to be completed by September 1, 1853, for a sum of $1,025.

The Circuit Court of Ste. Genevieve County ruled on November 23, 1853, that the trustees of the Ste. Genevieve Academy had the right to sell the academy and its grounds to Firmin A. Rozier.

A list of the 1854 roster of children at the Ste. Genevieve Academy reads like the social register of St. Louis and Ste. Genevieve. Even the children of Pierre Chouteau attended this school. The absence of poor children and "well behaved" Indians explains Rozier's next action.

On January 18, 1856, a Deed of Conveyance was recorded between the trustees of the Ste. Genevieve Academy as grantors, and Firmin A. Rozier. Rozier paid $400 to the Directors of the Public Schools for the benefit of public school children. This released Rozier from the obligation to educate 50 poor children free of charge for one year. Rozier then received from the trustees "fee simple absolute title" to the old academy, its improvements, and surrounding four acres.

The Ste. Genevieve Academy, directed by Rozier, was the most successful of three attempts to establish a lasting institution of higher learning on Academy Hill. Rozier's meticulous records and balance sheets show an institution with a minimum of 50 students. Well over half of these students boarded at an annual cost for tuition and board of between $175 and $200. This figure represented the average annual income of a laborer, which explains why the student body consisted entirely of the sons of socially prominent families.

== Civil War ==
The onslaught of the Civil war spelled a death knell to the school. Rozier lost all four of his teachers upon their enlistment into the Confederate Army. Replacement of the teaching staff was impossible. With the closing of the summer term in 1861, the academy forever closed its doors as an institution of higher learning.

== Conversion to private estate ==
The old mansion was not abandoned, as it had been in the past. Rozier converted the building with its splendid setting into the finest private estate in the county. The 50 ft by 25 ft classroom wing added in 1853 was converted on the first floor into a dining room, sitting room, and bathroom. A large central chimney was also added. The second floor rear wing was similarly divided and served as bedroom and a large library for the General. The original rooms of the 1808 stone portion of the Academy were never altered and were used as a drawing room, parlor, and bedrooms. Rozier acquired additional grounds for his estate, which ultimately expanded and covered ten acres. His children continued to live in the old academy until their deaths. In 1934, the academy and 10 acres of land were sold to the Ste. Genevieve Board of Education for $8,500.

== Acquisition by public school system ==
The Ste. Genevieve School District developed the ten-acre estate as the site for its public school system. All of the Academy's outbuildings were razed. Until the late 1950s the mansion remained occupied by the Superintendent of Schools.

The maintenance and repair of a museum property was not within the budge of the Board of Education. For over 30 years, the old academy was allowed to fall into a state of near collapse. In 1991, the Ste. Genevieve Board of Education donated the mansion to the state of Missouri. The old academy and one acre of land was placed in the Department of Natural Resources, Historic Properties Revolving Fund, and offered for sale.

== Contemporary history ==
The property was purchased by Timothy G. Conley in the spring of 1994 and restored over a five-year period. The Old Academy regained its place as a premier residence of Ste. Genevieve County. The building remains the oldest school building known to exist west of the Appalachian Mountains.
