= Desloge Consolidated Lead Company =

American lead mining company

Desloge Consolidated Lead Company was a lead mining company in the Southeast Missouri Lead District that was operated by the Desloge family in the 19th and early 20th century. The Desloge lead operations in the "Old Lead Belt", in the eastern Ozark Mountains, helped Missouri become the world's premier lead mining area.

== History ==
=== Desloge Lead Company ===
Firmin V. Desloge, who founded the Desloge Consolidated Lead Company

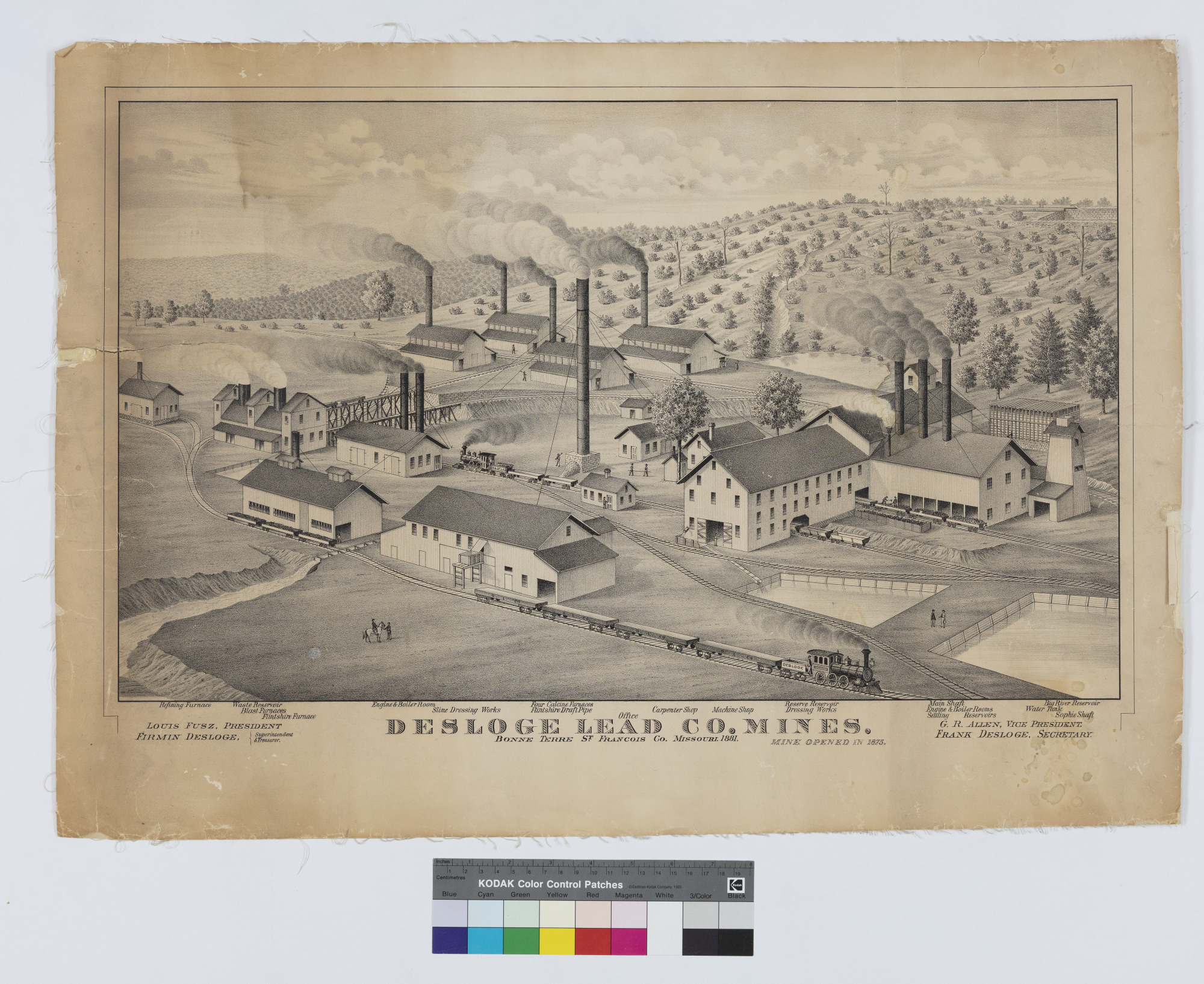
Desloge Lead Company Mines

Desloge Consolidated Lead Company crushing mill (top of photo)

Desloge Railroad and chat pile

Desloge locomotive

The businesses that would become the Desloge Consolidated Lead Company began around 1824, when Firmin Rene Desloge — founder of the Desloge Family in America — built a smelting furnace as an extension of his mercantile business in Potosi, Missouri.

His son, Firmin V. Desloge, expanded mining operations and moved management to Bonne Terre, Missouri. The Desloge mining property was established by the acquisition of the Pratte family land, north of the St. Joe property. On June 5, 1874, a charter was granted to the Missouri Lead and Smelting Company, which was renamed the Desloge Lead Company on February 21, 1876. In 1876 and 1877, the company sank three shafts and built a new mill in Bonne Terre.

A fire in March 1886 destroyed the concentrating mill plant and damaged the rest of the surface plant. The following year, the company's remaining assets were sold to St. Joseph Lead Company, which made Firmin V. Desloge a trustee on its board, a post he would hold until his death. This merger helped the St. Joe company become the "greatest lead-mining and smelting company in the world.

=== Desloge Consolidated Lead Company ===
After the fire, Desloge and his family took an option on a piece of land owned by the Bogy family which was called "Mine-a-Joe", one of the oldest mining properties in Missouri, and started another mining operation under the name Desloge Consolidated Lead Company. The new company cleared the land and built company houses for its workers just west of present-day Desloge, Missouri.

In 1893, the Desloges opened a new mine in St. Francois County, Missouri, just north of the St. Joe Lead Company property in Bonne Terre, on a tract of land originally granted to Jean Bte. Pratte and designated as U. S. Survey No. 3099. The mill and smelting plant could produce 500 tons of lead per day.

Firmin Desloge II expanded lead mining operations by buying the Bogy Lead Mine Company and the St. Francois Mining Company. Along with his partners, he organized a new company called Desloge Consolidated Lead Company. The company sank mine shafts and built mills, smelting furnaces, and power stations. The Desloge Consolidated Lead Company's mine consisted of three shafts. Shaft No. 1 was the old Bogy shaft, and connected with shaft No. 2 by a tunnel. Two runs of ore had been drifted; the bottom of the lower run was at a depth of about 320 feet, and the face of the drift is in places as much as 60 feet high. The upper run is between the depths of 190 and 270 feet. Shaft No. 3 was sunk to a depth of nearly 300'feet.

Firmin Desloge remained on the board of directors of St. Joe Lead Company from the time of St. Joe's acquisition of Desloge Lead Company in Bonne Terre in 1886 until his death in 1929.

Ultimately, the company's lead operations required a massive real estate effort involving hundreds of land leases, purchases, options, rights of refusals, mineral rights, chattel mortgages, deed transfers, quit-claims, trust deeds, judgment sales, sheriff’s sales, bankruptcy sales, grants, bonds, notes, and various claims from area miners covering thousands of acres and hundreds of parcels of land.

The Desloge Consolidated Lead Company built and operated a hospital to serve the miners and local community located in Desloge, Missouri on Fir Street. The lengthy Desloge family association with this hospital is the catalyst to Firmin V. Desloge II donating to fund Firmin Desloge Hospital in St. Louis, Missouri.

==== Railroads, timber, and sawmills ====
To serve the Desloge and St. Joe mines, Firmin Desloge II built the first railroads to penetrate the disseminated lead field of St. Francois County: the Desloge Railway, the Mississippi River and Bonne Terre Railway, and the Valley Railroad.

Desloge also helped develop the St. Louis, Iron Mountain and Southern Railway (aka the Iron Mountain Railroad), which opened in 1874 from St. Louis to Texarkana, Arkansas. When the St. Joseph Lead Company built a 13.5-mile narrow-gauge railroad from its mines to the Iron Mountain tracks at Summit in Washington County, the Desloge Company paid one-third of the costs.

The company bought many acres of timber and built sawmills.

By 1901, mining operations at Desloge, Missouri, included 3,640 acres.

==== Late-century lobbying ====
The Revenue Act of 1894, also known as the Wilson-Gorman Tariff, lowered protective tariffs on lead (although it raised rates on sugar and other materials). The prospect of cheaper imported lead threatened the Desloge company and other southeast Missouri lead businesses, so Firmin Desloge II went to Washington, D.C., to lobby for its repeal. In the meantime, he spent part of his own fortune to continue operations, retained his employees, and stockpiled instead of sold his pig lead instead. The lead industry's lobbying efforts paid off in 1897, when the Dingley Act once again raised barriers to lead imports.

=== 1900s ===
Around 1916, the Desloge Consolidated Lead Company moved its corporate offices from Desloge to the 1892 Rialto Building in downtown St. Louis. Despite the city's history as a fur-trading center, "more money passed through St. Louis as a result of the lead business in Missouri,” Robert E. McHenry wrote in his 2006 book Chat Dumps of The Missouri Lead Belt.

==== Sale ====
In 1929, the company sold its plant to the St. Joe Lead Company for $18 million ($337,500,000 today) as $10,700,000 cash and $7,000,000 in bonds and other securities. A trade newspaper wrote, “With the absorption of the Desloge concern by the St. Joseph Lead Company, one of the oldest mining companies of the district goes out of existence as a company.”

The Desloge Consolidated Lead Company, and specifically Firmin Rene Desloge and Firmin Desloge II, were described in 1932 as "the most distinguished of American mining engineers".

== Primary sources ==
- The Desloge Family Collection at Missouri Historical Society, St. Louis, MO
- Desloge Consolidated Lead Company records at Missouri Historical Society, St. Louis, MO
- The Rozier Collection at Missouri Historical Society, St. Louis, MO
- Southeast Missouri Mining and Milling. Doe Run Company. 2004.
- Potosi (Missouri) Historical Society
