= Saint Louis University School of Medicine =

Private medical school in St. Louis, Missouri, US

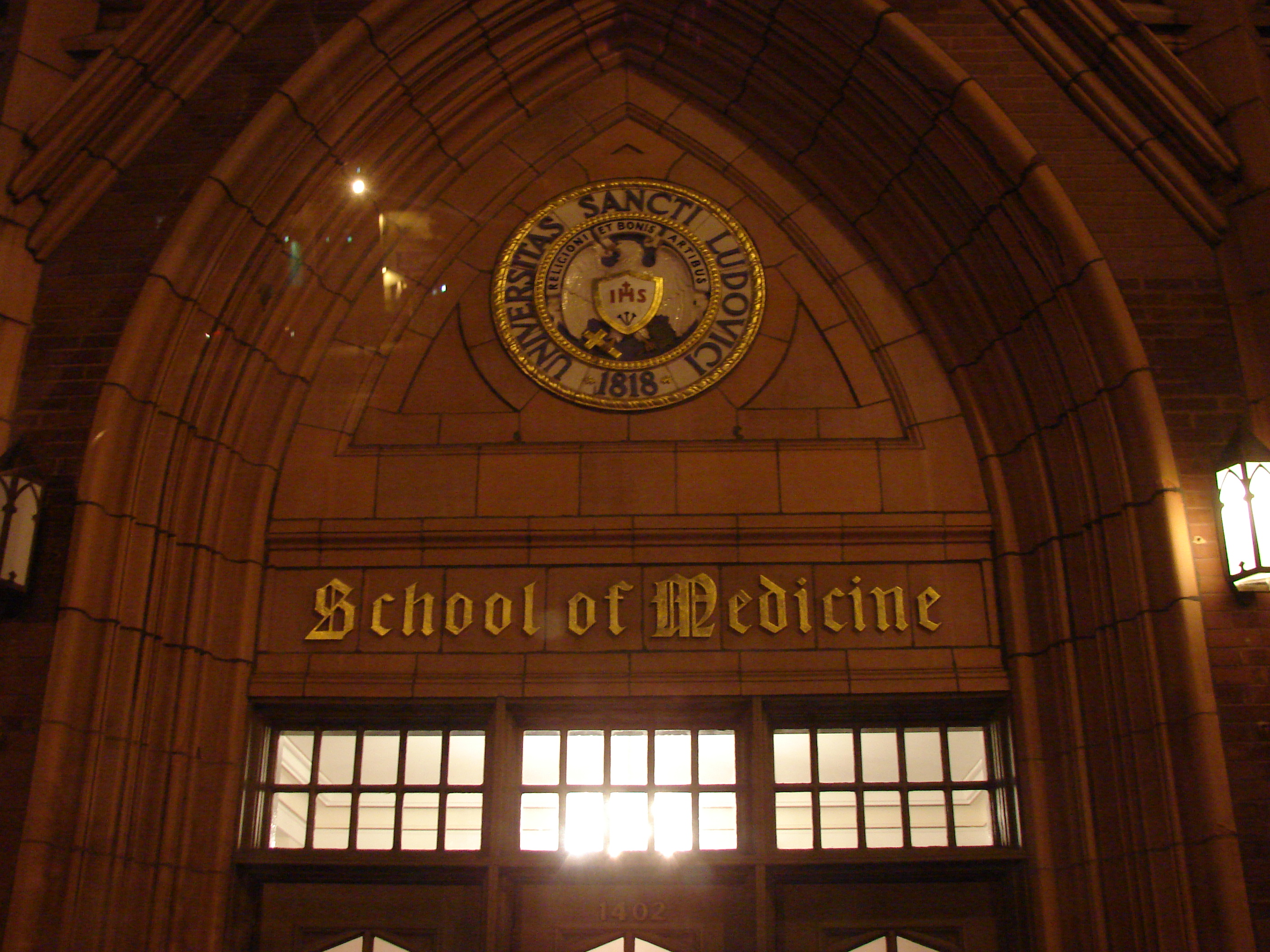
- Type: Private
- Established: 1836; 190 years ago
- Parent institution: Saint Louis University
- Religious affiliation: Roman Catholic – Jesuit
- Dean: Christine Jacobs, (M.D.)
- Academic staff: ~550
- Students: ~700
- Location: St. Louis, Missouri, U.S. 38°37′21″N 90°14′16″W
- Campus: Urban
- Website: Official Website

Saint Louis University School of Medicine is a private, Jesuit medical school. Part of Saint Louis University, the institution was established in 1836.

The school has an enrollment of around 700, with about 550 faculty members and 550 residents in 48 graduate medical education programs including residencies, subspecialty residencies and fellowships. The institution centers its research in five specific areas: cancer, infectious disease, liver disease, aging/neurological disorders, and heart/lung disease. Cardinal Glennon Children's Hospital and Saint Louis University Hospital are the two main affiliated teaching hospitals of the school.

== History ==
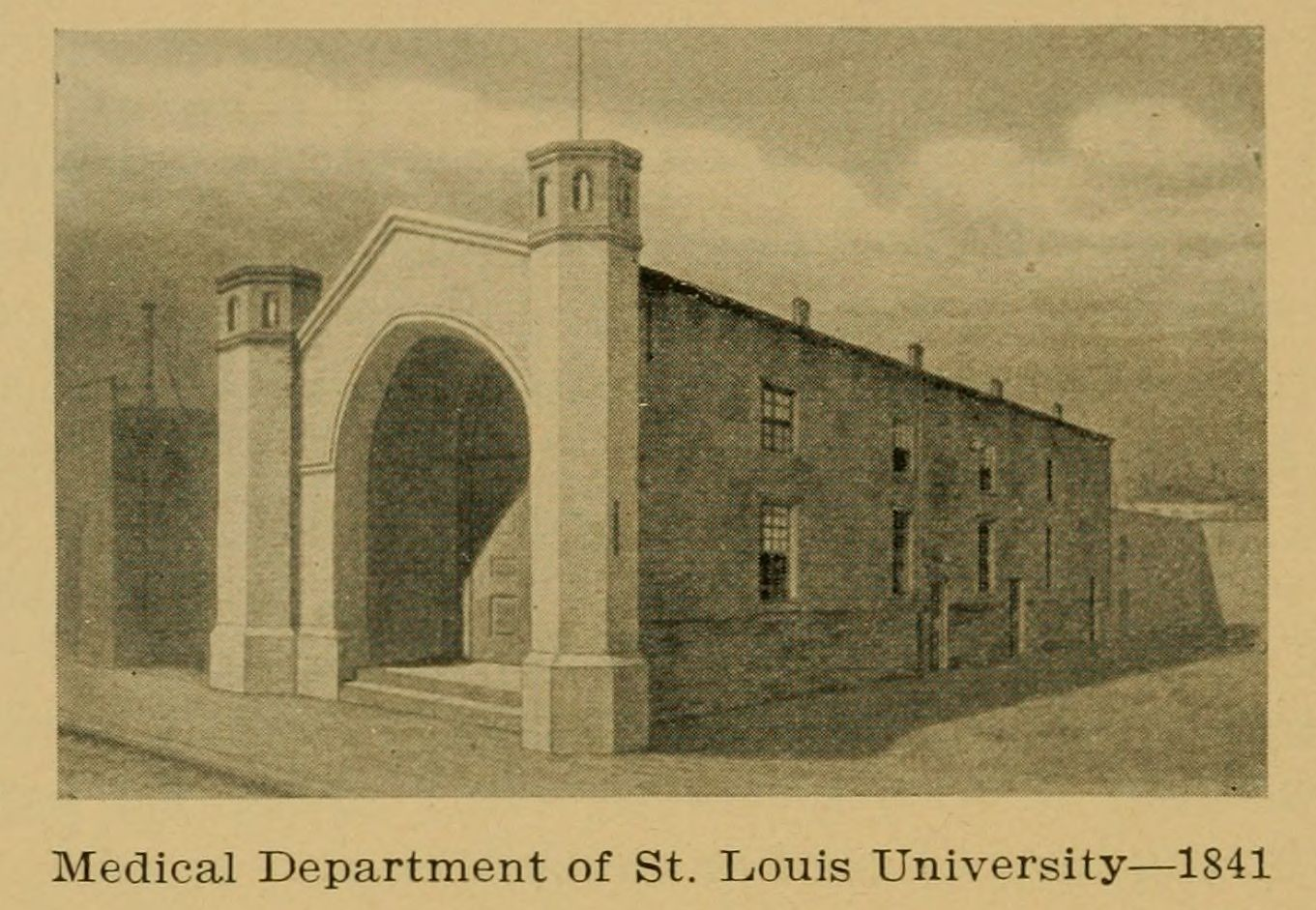
The medical department in 1841

=== Early years ===
Saint Louis University School of Medicine was established in 1836 as the Saint Louis University Medical Department, but no active teaching occurred until 1841.

The Know-Nothing movement, an anti-immigrant and subsequently anti Catholic movement that surged through the United States in the 1840s and 1850s eventually led to the separation of the university's Medical Department from the university in 1854. As a result, the university was without a medical school for 49 years until the presidency of Father William Banks Rogers (1900 to 1908), during which plans were initiated for the integration of a new medical school into the university.

In 1903, the Marion Sims-Beaumont College of Medicine was incorporated into the university. At this time, Marion Sims-Beaumont College was a medical school owned and operated by a group of St. Louis physicians. The college's decision to merge with the university was greatly influenced and reinforced by the recommendations of the Council on Medical Education and Hospitals of the American Medical Association, which insisted that all schools of medicine be affiliated with a university. Assured of financial support from the St. Louis civic leader Festus J. Wade, President Rogers successfully secured the needed funds for the purchase of the Marion Sims-Beaumont College.

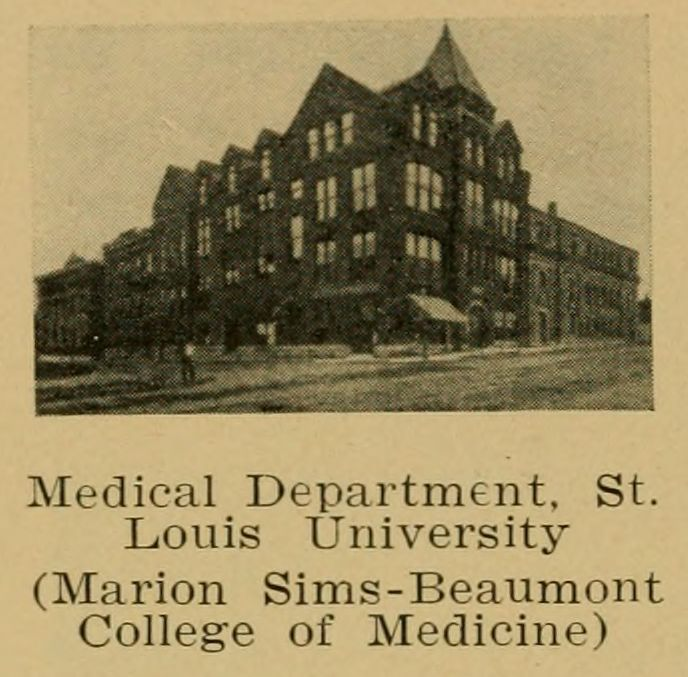
Marion Sims-Beaumont College of Medicine in 1910

=== Recent history ===
Since 1994, the students and physicians of the School of Medicine have provided free primary healthcare services in an academic environment through their Health Resource Center. They currently operate several free clinics throughout the Saint Louis area including an asthma and allergy clinic, a heart health clinic, a diabetes clinic, a foot health clinic, a geriatric assessment clinic, a physical therapy clinic, a mental health clinic, an optometry clinic, an OB-GYN clinic, and a dermatology clinic.

In 2007, a new research center was added to the university. Constructed in 522 working days, the 10-story tower now stands at the northern gateway to the university's Medical Center. The $82 million, 206,000-square-foot building is named after the late Dr. Edward Adelbert Doisy, a Nobel Laureate and professor at the medical school for five decades. The Edward A. Doisy research center has eighty research labs spanning eight stories to supplement the efforts of medical researchers.

The medical school continues to conduct research in several different fields, especially emerging diseases, neuroscience, organ transplantation, vaccine development, cardiac health, and liver disorders. The Saint Louis School of Medicine is one of nine NIH-funded vaccine research institutions, and made contributions to the research and development of the COVID-19 vaccine. Additionally, the Saint Louis University Liver Center is one of the largest hepatitis C practices in the world.

== Admissions and rankings ==
August 2021 matriculates to Saint Louis University School of Medicine had an overall average GPA of 3.86 and a mean MCAT2015 score of 512.22. Apart from these academic characteristics, the admissions committee considers applicants on an individual level, particularly in the evaluation of the breadth of their educational experience, their personality traits, maturity level, and appropriate motivation and commitment to a career in medicine. The faculty-student ratio is 0.9:1.

As of 2022, Saint Louis University School of Medicine is ranked 73rd for medical research and 56th for its primary care program by U.S. News & World Report.

== Facilities ==
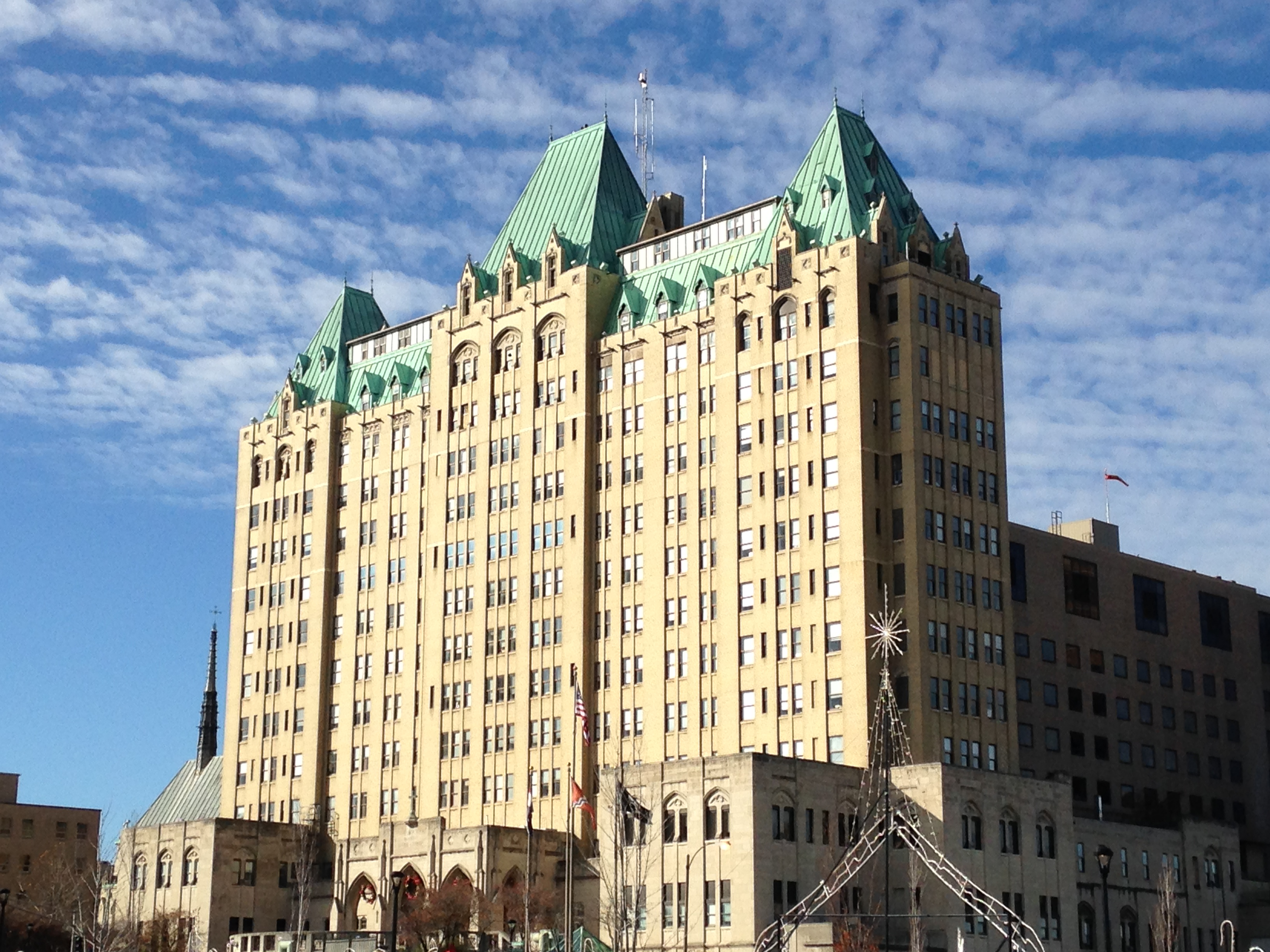
Firmin Desloge Hospital, part of Saint Louis University Hospital

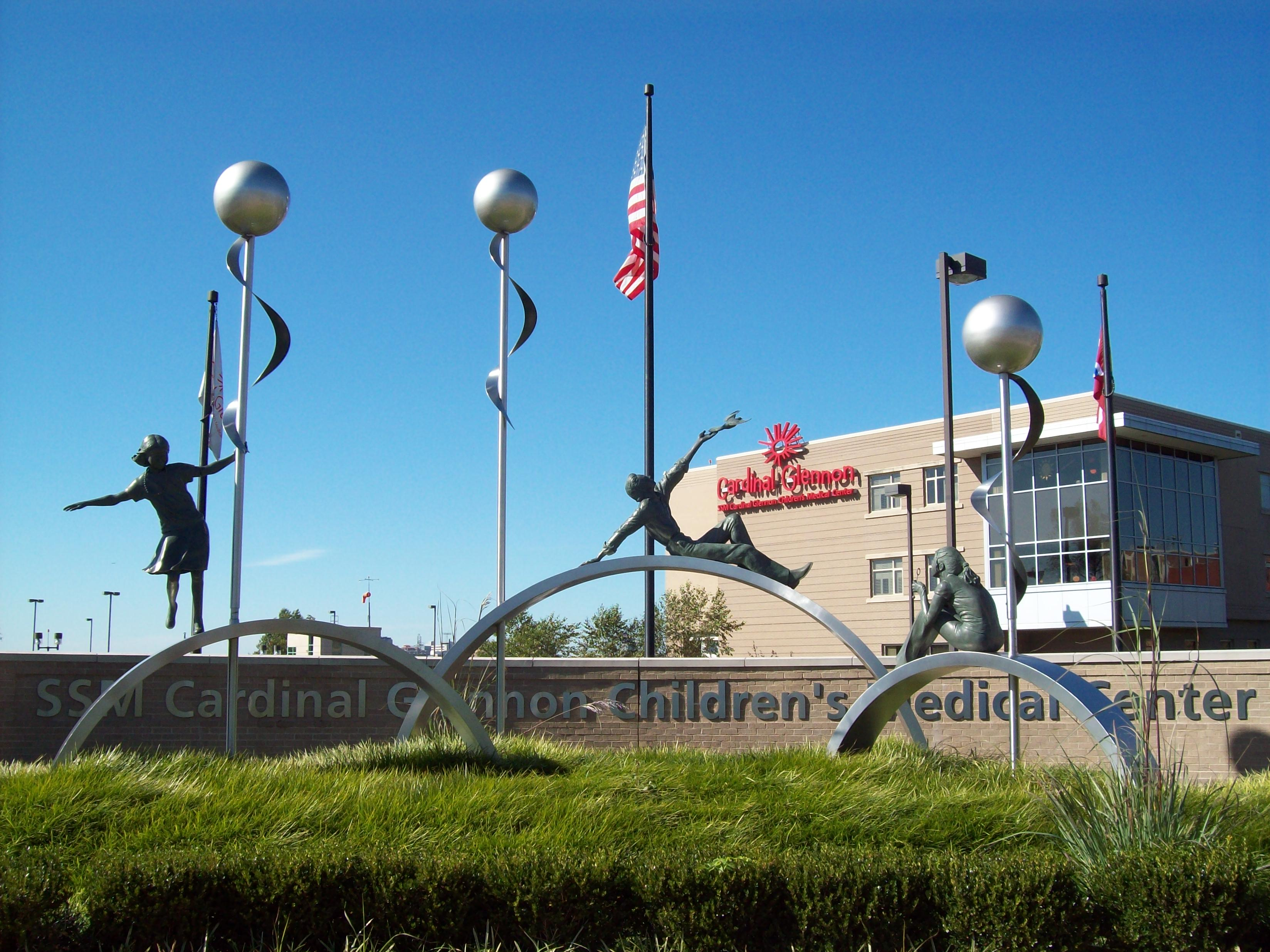
Cardinal Glennon Children's Hospital
