= Desloge Chapel =

Gothic church in St. Louis, Missouri

- Desloge Chapel
- 38.6226°N 90.2386°W
- Address: Grand Ave. and Vista Ave. St. Louis, Missouri
- Country: United States
- Denomination: Roman Catholic

History
- Founder(s): Firmin V. Desloge and the Desloge family
- Consecrated: November 9, 1933

Architecture
- Architect: Ralph Adams Cram
- Architectural type: Gothic
- Completed: 1933

Administration
- Archdiocese: Roman Catholic Archdiocese of St. Louis

Desloge Chapel is a Gothic church in St. Louis, Missouri. Located at Grand Avenue and Vista Avenue, it was designed by Gothic revivalist architect Ralph Adams Cram to echo the Sainte-Chapelle chapel in Paris, France.

Built in 1931-33 for the Firmin Desloge Hospital, now St. Louis University Medical Center, the chapel serves as an ecumenical pastoral chapel for the hospital complex, and is formally designated the Chapel of Christ the Crucified King by the Roman Catholic church within the Archdiocese of St. Louis.

Desloge Chapel Interior, rear

Desloge Chapel Interior, altar

== History ==
Like the hospital it serves, the Desloge Chapel was underwritten by gifts from the family of Firmin V. Desloge, one of the oldest French families in the United States and wealthy through lead mining and other endeavors. Firmin's wife Lydia Holden Davis Desloge gave $100,000 ($1,927,291 today) to build the chapel. These figures of dollars over time do not include the fact that it has been estimated that to build this Chapel with current known costs, it would cost over $30,000,000 in 2025 to recreate this chapel in current times.

Roman Catholic Archbishop John J. Glennon laid the cornerstone of the hospital on June 22, 1931, and consecrated the chapel on November 9, 1933.

In 1952, the funeral of the founder's son, Firmin V. Desloge II, was held at the chapel.

In 1998, Saint Louis University sold the Chapel, along with the Hospital, to Tenet Healthcare, a for-profit chain based in Dallas.

In 2015, the university bought back the hospital, then sold it to SSM Health, the Creve Coeur-based health care system sponsored by the Franciscan Sisters of Mary, formerly Sisters of Saint Mary.

== Design ==
The stained glass windows were planned by Father Maurice B.McNamee, designed by Rodney Winfield, and fabricated by Emil Frei Associates in 1983. An artisan since 1898, Emil Frei also designed the stained glass windows for St. Louis University's St. Francis Xavier (College) Church. Frei's son, Emil Frei III, became an American physician and oncologist at Firmin Desloge Hospital. An earlier plan, with windows depicting Jesuit missions in North America, was created by the firm of Reynolds, Francis & Rohnstock of Boston.

At the altar is a major sculptural group of the Crucifixion by John Angel, the British-born sculptor, medallist, and lecturer.

== Future ==
As of October 2015, SSM Health was planning to spend $500 million to rebuild and expand the hospital. Various media reported that the options under consideration include demolishing the Chapel and the 1933 hospital tower; SSM officials say they have not ruled that out.

Desloge scion Christopher Desloge has launched an effort to preserve the chapel and hospital that his family helped build.

The original architectural firm of Ralph Adams Cram (now Cram & Ferguson) which designed Desloge Chapel in 1931 has, eighty-five years later in 2016, joined the list of Stakeholders signing a letter to the owner SSM appealing for preservation.

In November 2016, St. Louis University released its redevelopment plans for the area. The plan does not call for demolishing Desloge Chapel, leading the St. Louis Post Dispatch to report that "the iconic Firmin Desloge tower along Grand Boulevard appears safe for now."
