= Murrill Hill =

Summit in the US state of Missouri

Coordinates: 37°53′10″N 90°33′06″W

Murrill Hill is a summit in St. Francois County in the U.S. state of Missouri. The hill has a peak elevation of 797 feet (243 m). The hill lies within a horseshoe bend in Big River about three quarters of a mile west of Desloge.

Murrill Hill has the name of Tom Murrill, the original owner of the site.
