= SLUH =

SLUH may refer to:

- St. Louis University High School
- Saint Louis University Hospital
