= Firmin A. Rozier =

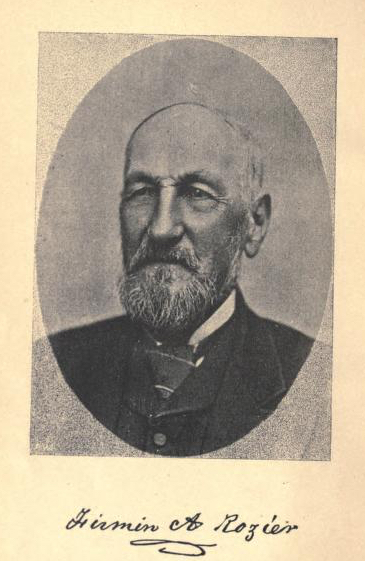

Firmin Andrew Rozier (July 31, 1820–1897) was a soldier, banker, historian, author and state legislator in Missouri. He was from a prominent family. He served in the Missouri House of Representatives and Missouri Senate. He was the son of Ferdinand Rozier (1777–1864).

Readable pdf

He studied at St. Mary's College and clerked on the steamboat Vandalia. He studied at Transylvania Law School and served in the Missouri Guards with John C. Fremont on an expedition to Californian that made it as far as Leavenworth, Kansas. He then served with the state militia and ran for U.S. congress. He then became a banker.

He married Mary Valle. His son Firmin Rozier was present for the bank's robbery in 1873.

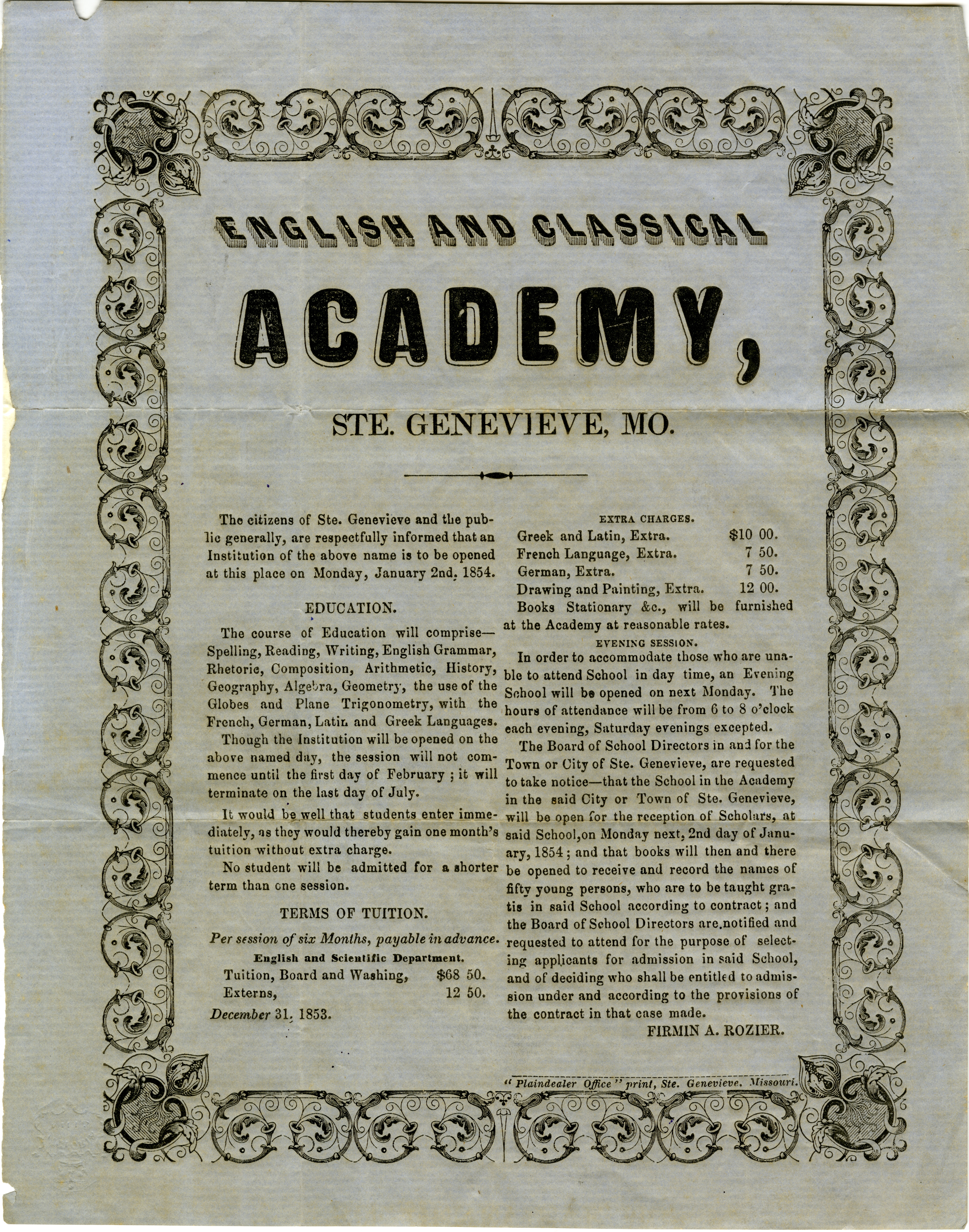

He served as mayor of Ste. Genevieve.

He gave an address on the founding of Ste. Genevieve July 21, 1883. It was printed. He authored Rozier's History of the Early Settlement of the Mississippi Valley published by G. A. Pierrot & Sons in st. Louis (1890).

== See also ==
- Ste. Genevieve Academy
- Jean Ferdinand Rozier
