= Desloge family =

Business family in Missouri, United States

- American Business family
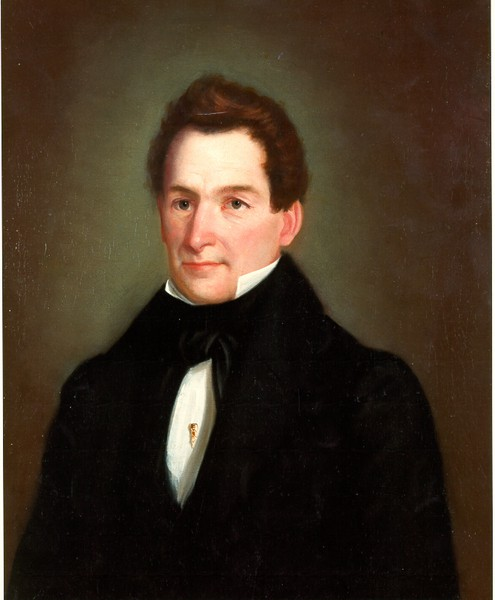
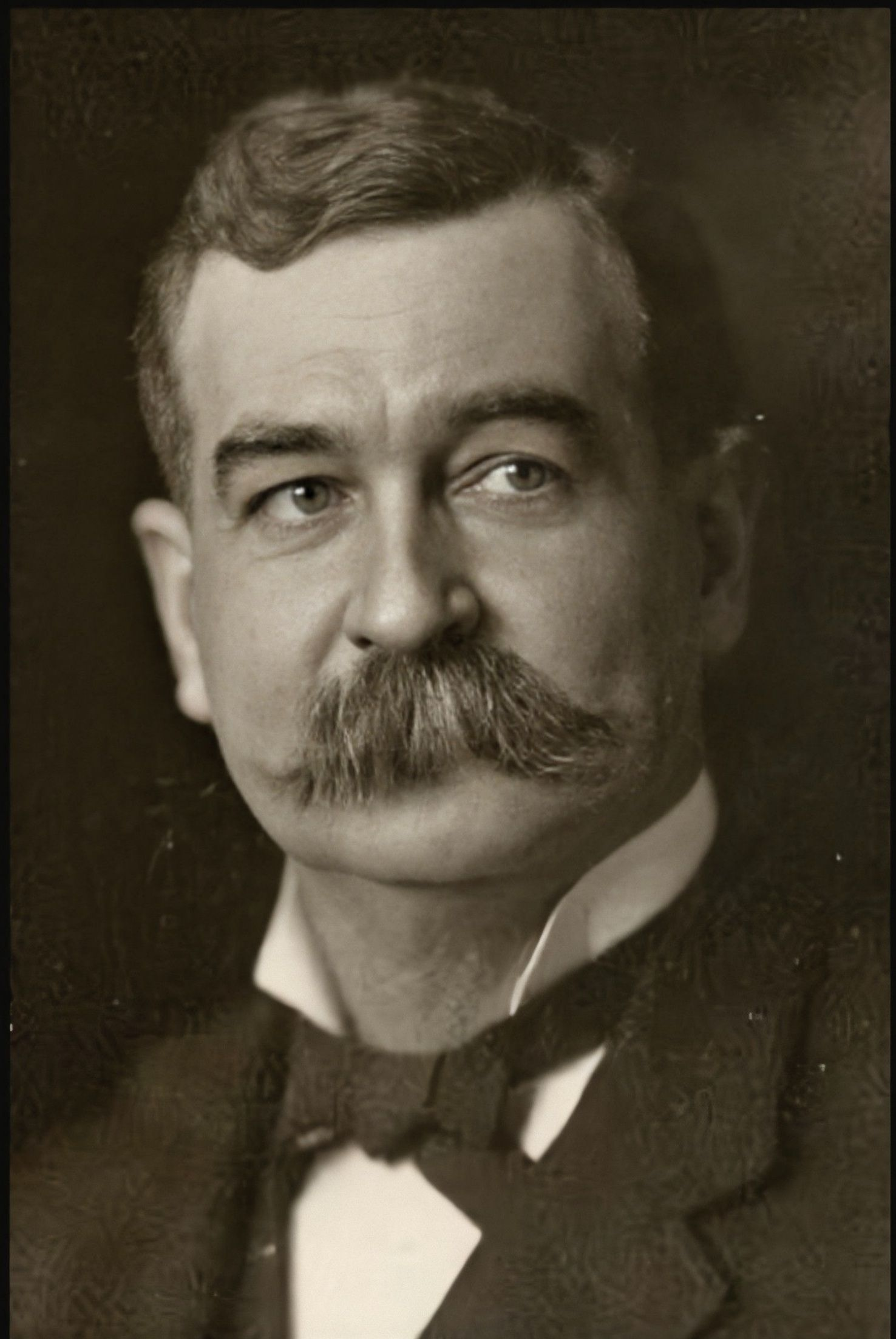
- Firmin René Desloge Firmin V. Desloge
- Country: Nantes, France
- Current region: United States
- Founded: Arrival in the United States 1823, Potosi, Missouri, U.S.; 203 years ago
- Founder: Firmin René Desloge (1803–1856)
- Estate: List: Vouziers Estate (Saint Louis, Missouri)

The Desloge family, (/dəˈloʊʒ/) centered mostly in Missouri and especially at St. Louis, rose to wealth through international commerce, sugar refining, oil drilling, fur trading, mineral mining, saw milling, manufacturing, railroads, real estate, and riverboats. The family has funded hospitals and donated large tracts of land for public parks and conservation.

== History ==
=== 19th century ===
The family's progenitor was Firmin René Desloge, a descendant of French nobility who emigrated to Missouri in 1823 to join his uncle Jean Ferdinand Rozier who had arrived in Missouri in 1810 with Rozier's business partner John James Audubon.

The family's businesses in lead and mercantile in Missouri date from around 1824, when Firmin Rene Desloge built his own smelting furnace as an extension of his Potosi, Missouri, mercantile business. They grew to include the Missouri Lead Mining and Smelting Company in 1874 and the Desloge Lead Company in 1876, inclusively one of the largest and oldest lead mining companies in America.

The family moved to St. Louis in 1861, at the outset of the American Civil War, after various attacks at Potosi, Bonne Terre and upon the family lead mining works by both Federal and Confederate armies who sought lead for weapons.

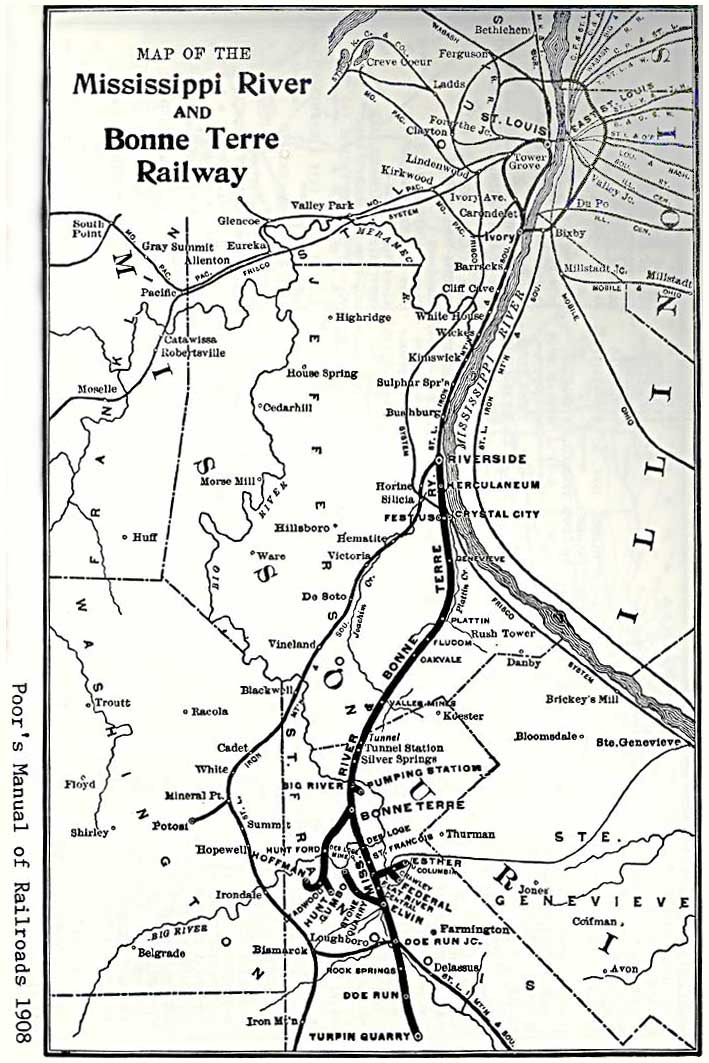
The main line and connections of the Mississippi River & Bonne Terre Railway, built to serve lead mines in southeastern Missouri

Firmin Rene Desloge's son, Firmin V. Desloge II, expanded mining operations and expanded management to Bonne Terre, Missouri; a charter was requested and granted to the Missouri Lead and Smelting Company on June 5, 1874. The corporate name was later changed to "The Desloge Lead Company" on February 21, 1876. Three shafts were sunk during 1876 and 1877 and a new mill was built. In 1886, a fire destroyed the concentrating mill plant and damaged the rest of surface plant of the Desloge Lead Company. Rather than rebuild, Desloge II sold the firm to the St. Joseph Lead Company. In 1887, the land was cleared and company houses for his staff were constructed at the location which became known as Deslogetown: present-day Desloge, Missouri. Desloge II then founded a new company, the Desloge Consolidated Lead Company.

To serve his mines, Desloge II also built the first railroads to penetrate the disseminated lead field of St. Francois County, Missouri: the Desloge Railway, the Mississippi River and Bonne Terre Railway and then the Valley Railroad. Desloge II was also involved with the development of the Iron Mountain and Southern Railroad (aka the Iron Mountain Railroad) from St. Louis, Missouri, to Texarkana, Arkansas. The St. Joseph Lead Company built a 13.5-mile narrow gauge railroad from the mines to a junction with the Iron Mountain Railroad at Summit in Washington County. St. Joe paid two-thirds of the construction costs; the Desloge Company the rest.

=== 20th century ===
Around 1916, the Desloge Consolidated Lead Company moved its corporate offices from Desloge, Missouri, to the Rialto Building in downtown St. Louis. While "St. Louis, with its French ancestry, has been noted as a fur capital, more money passed through St. Louis as a result of the lead business in Missouri than did because of the fur business", wrote Doe Run Company CEO Jeffry Zelm. The oldest St. Louis-based lead family is Desloge.

Firmin V. Desloge IV owned and was president of Smokey Oil Company.

In 1922, Firmin Desloge II's nephew Louis Desloge (from Jules Desloge) founded Watlow to manufacture electric heating elements for the shoe industry. The name alludes to low-watt electric heaters that replace steam heat. In 2011, Watlow, still a Desloge family business, employed 2,000 employees in 13 factories in the United States, Mexico, Europe, and Asia; had sales offices in 16 countries; and distributed globally. In 2021, the family sold a majority stake in Watlow to Tinicum LP, a private-equity firm.

Firmin Desloge II's son, Joseph Desloge, designed an industry-specialty electric fuse that would "kill the arc" and founded Killark Electric in 1913. Joseph Desloge also owned Minerva Oil (a confusing misnomer as it was primarily mining zinc and fluorspar); founded Louisiana Manufacturing Company and Atlas Manufacturing Company; and pursued fluorspar mining in southeastern Illinois. Joseph Desloge's son Joseph Jr. owned uranium mines near Moab, Utah, which he and his partner sold to General Electric; he also made money in natural gas exploration in Lycoming County, Pennsylvania.

Firmin Desloge II's new company operated until 1929, when it was sold to the St. Joseph Lead Company for $18 million (about $337,500,000 today). The sale lifted the family's wealth past $52 million. Desloge II died that same year as one of the wealthiest men in the world, alongside William Vanderbilt ($52 million) and Andrew Mellon ($50 million), and about half as wealthy as the Astors ($100 million).

In 1926, the family built a 15,000-square foot French-style mansion on an estate of thousands of acres in present-day Florissant, Missouri, north of St. Louis on the Missouri River. The family hosted Russian ballerinas, Shakespearean actors, King Hussein of Jordan, and Anne Morrow Lindbergh. They sheltered the exiled Chancellor of Austria Kurt Schuschnigg, deposed by the Nazis in 1938, freed from encarceration in May 1945. In April 2024, the estate was sold to the Augustine Institute, a private Catholic graduate theology school, which announced plans to move there from Denver.

== Society ==
Three members of the Desloge family have been "Queen of Love and Beauty" at the Veiled Prophet Ball, a debutante ball held in December in St. Louis: Anne Kennett Farrar Desloge (daughter of Joseph Desloge Sr.) in 1946, her cousin and goddaughter Diane Waring Desloge (daughter of William L. Desloge) in 1962, and Katherine Falk Desloge (daughter of Stephen F. Desloge) in 2013.

=== Reputed Kennedy connection ===
Durie Malcolm, wife of Firmin V. Desloge IV, was long rumored to have been briefly married to John F. Kennedy in 1947 in Palm Beach, Florida. FBI reports accessed through FOI requests appear to substantiate the rumors. In 1998, Malcolm's sister-in-law, Mrs. William L. Desloge, endorsed the story in a personal interview: "Of course it's true, we were all there at the parties in Palm Beach with them."

== Philanthropy ==
The 1932 bequest of Desloge II funded the Firmin Desloge Hospital, today known as St. Louis University Hospital; a separate bequest one year later from his wife, Lydia Desloge, built a Desloge Chapel at the hospital. Desloge II willed his original 47 acres of his hand-dug pits of the original lead mining operations and the deeply rutted wagon tracks on a property in Washington County. The family then donated this land for a park, today named Firmin Desloge Park, and dedicated it to the mining families in the area.

In 1955, Joseph Desloge donated to the state of Missouri some 2,400 acres of land acquired over 17 years in Reynolds County. The land, which included a shut-in region and more than two miles of river frontage, today composes the bulk of Johnson's Shut-Ins State Park. He continued donating money to improve the park. Desloge also donated land for Sunset Park in north St. Louis County on the Missouri River; and sold to St. Louis County the 2,300-acre Pelican Island in the middle of the Missouri River (for just $91 an acre) as a nature preserve.
