= Firmin V. Desloge =

American industrialist (1843–1929)

Firmin Vincent Desloge II
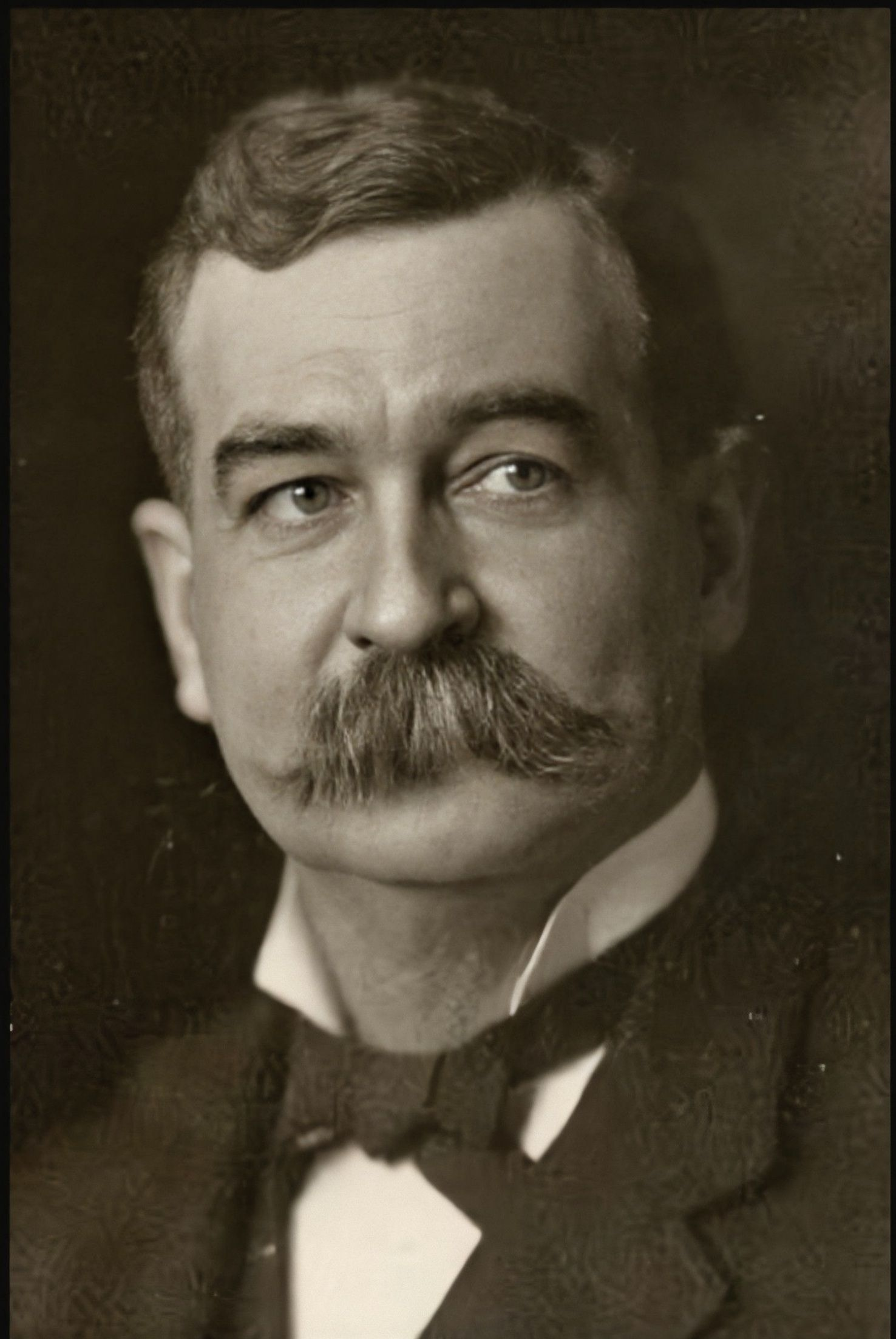
- Born: August 30, 1843; Potosi, Missouri, U.S.
- Died: December 18, 1929 (aged 86); Richmond Heights, Missouri, U.S.
- Burial place: Calvary Cemetery
- Monuments: Firmin Desloge Hospital; Desloge Chapel
- Education: Saint Louis University; Bryant & Stratton College
- Spouse: Lydia Holden Davis (m. 1877)
- Father: Firmin René Desloge
- Family: Desloge family

Signature
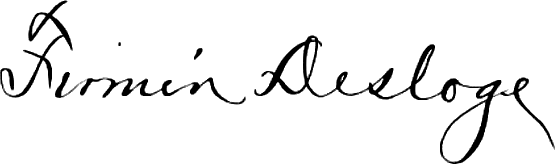

Firmin Vincent Desloge II (August 30, 1843 – December 18, 1929) was an American industrialist lead mining pioneer in the disseminated lead fields of the Southeast Missouri Lead District and member of the Desloge family in America.

Firmin Vincent Desloge

== Life ==
In 1822, Desloge's father, Firmin René Desloge, came to America from France to work with his uncle Jean Ferdinand Rozier from Ste. Genevieve, Missouri.

Born August 30, 1843, in Potosi, Missouri, the young Desloge received his early education in the public schools at Potosi, where the family businesses included fur trading, distilling, and mining. He attended Saint Louis University and later Bryant & Stratton College in St. Louis, Missouri. He was trained to mercantile pursuits, beginning at an early age as a clerk for the firm of John B. Valle & Co. of St. Louis.

In 1867, Desloge began mining operations near Potosi, in Washington County. One county to the east was St. Francois County, Missouri, where lead mining was in its infancy. There he prospected lands next to those of the St. Joseph Lead Company, and finally purchased and erected smelting works for the corporation known as the Desloge Lead Company. Desloge built a connection with the St. Joseph Lead Company, the first railroad to penetrate the disseminated lead field of St. Francois County. In 1887, the two companies merged to create what was probably the era's greatest lead-mining and smelting company.

In 1889, the Bogy Lead Mining Company sold Desloge one of the oldest mining properties in Missouri. He demonstrated that there were valuable deposits of disseminated lead on these lands and folded them into the new Desloge Consolidated Lead Company. The town built to support the mines is now known as Desloge, Missouri. The use of the new diamond drill and the 1893 arrival of a branch from the Mississippi River & Bonne Terre Railroad allowed the already-successful lead mining operations to expand.

A grandson of one of Desloge's friends and business colleagues, Harry Cantwell Sr., said:

They say that grandfather and Desloge [Firmin Desloge] were riding in a surrey one day trying to decide where to sink a shaft. Desloge spit off one side of the surrey and said there was where they would sink the shaft. Grandfather didn't agree with the location of the spit and split with Desloge to form his own company.

Desloge soon sank a shaft and struck the same main vein and deposits as that of those he had worked at Bonne Terre before the fire.

Desloge remained on the St. Joseph Lead Company board of directors until his death in 1929.

== Marriage ==
On October 24, 1877, Firmin Desloge was married at Lexington, Missouri, to Lydia Holden Davis, born June 24, 1855, in Lexington, the daughter of Rebecca (Nave) Davis and Confederate Army Colonel William Joseph Davis, quartermaster to General Sterling Price during the American Civil War. They had four children: Firmin Vincent III, Clara Cynthian, Edwin Owen, and Joseph.

From 1870 to 1872, Desloge served as treasurer of Washington County, Missouri. He served as a public school director there and in St. Francois County.

== Philanthropy ==
In 1930, a $1 million ($19,272,908 today) bequest from Desloge's estate built Firmin Desloge Hospital in St. Louis. (For comparison, John D. Rockefeller Jr. acquired the whole Grand Teton mountain range (Teton Range) of 35,000 acres in the 1920s for about $1.4 million.)

Desloge's wife Lydia gave another $100,000 ($1,927,291 today) to build the adjacent Desloge Chapel.

== Death ==
Firmin V. Desloge died December 18, 1929, in Richmond Heights, Missouri. His estate was settled in 1932, valued at more than $52 million ($1,227,073,171 today). He was one of the wealthiest men of that era, alongside W. K. Vanderbilt ($52 million) and A. W. Mellon ($50 million), but only half as wealthy as the Astors ($100 million). A 1909 biography stated, "His life record stands as an exemplification of the fact that success is not a matter of genius as held by some, but the outcome of clear judgment, experience and intelligently directed effort."
