= SSM Health Saint Mary's Hospital – Madison =

St. Mary's Hospital in Madison, Wisconsin

SSM Health St. Mary's Hospital – Madison
- SSM Health
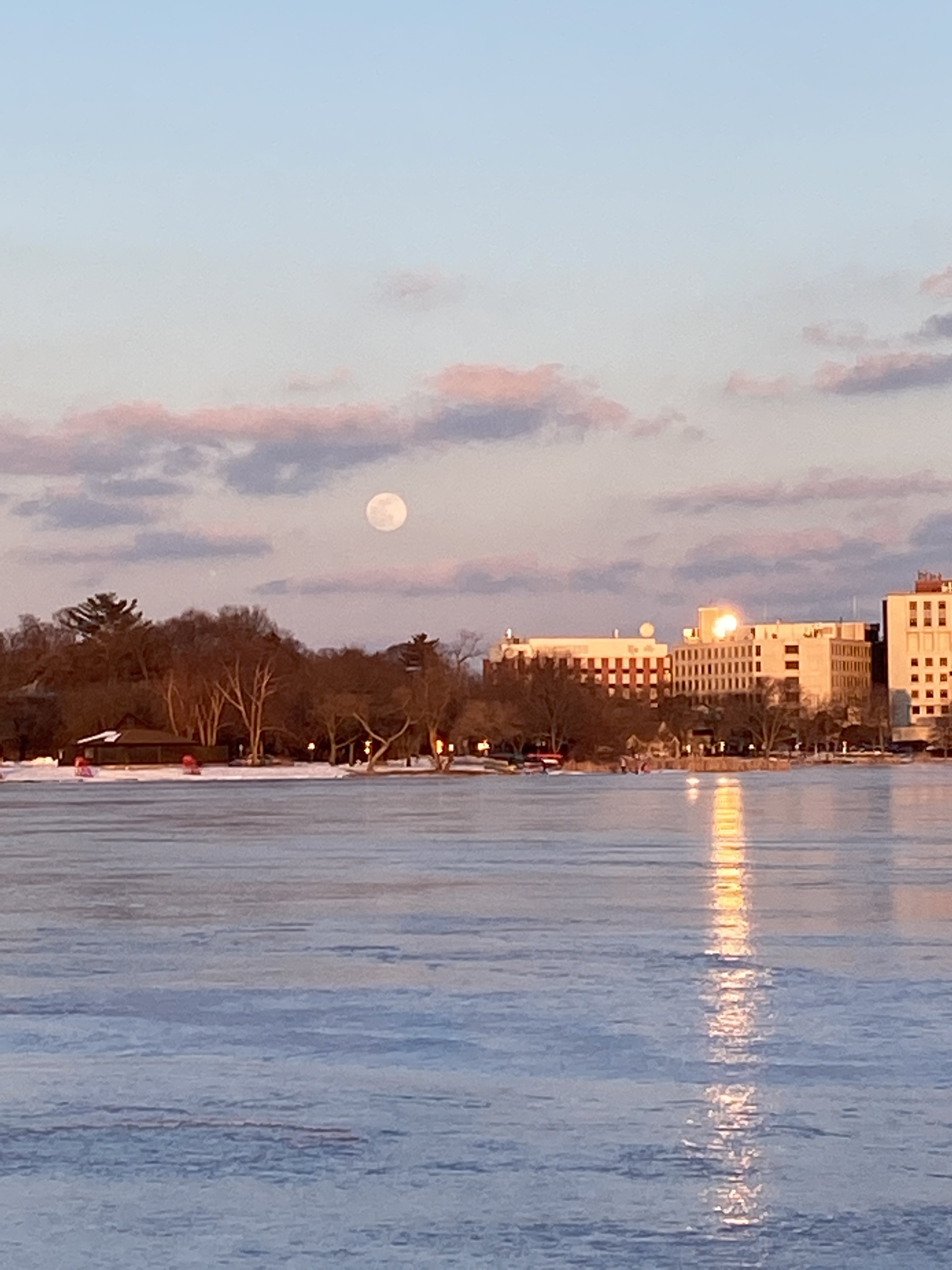
- A view of St. Mary's Hospital from the middle of frozen Lake Wingra as the sun sets

Geography
- Location: 700 South Park St., Madison, Wisconsin, United States
- Coordinates: 43.05921°N 89.40248°W

Services
- Emergency department: Level II Trauma Center
- Beds: 440

Helipads
- Helipad: FAA LID: WS52

History
- Opened: September 22, 1912

Links
- Website: www.ssmhealth.com/locations/wisconsin/st-marys-hospital-madison
- Lists: Hospitals in Wisconsin

SSM Health Saint Mary's Hospital – Madison, formerly St. Mary's Hospital, is a 440-bed not-for-profit hospital located in Madison, Wisconsin that serves 18 surrounding south-central Wisconsin counties. It is a part of the SSM Health system based in St. Louis. Sister hospitals in Wisconsin include St. Clare Hospital in Baraboo and St. Mary's Janesville Hospital. In June 2020, St. Mary's Hospital had 440 hospital beds.

== History ==
In 1912, at the request of several Madison physicians and local clergy, eight Sisters of Mary arrived from St. Louis, Missouri where the congregation had founded St. Mary's Infirmary. They proceeded to establish a "Sisters' Hospital" for the city of Madison. St. Mary's Hospital opened with 70 beds on September 22, 1912.

== Services ==
St. Mary's Hospital – Madison is a general medical and surgical facility. St. Mary's Hospital offers a wide variety of inpatient and outpatient health and wellness services specializing in cardiac, family birth, pediatrics, neuroscience, geriatrics, orthopedics, and emergency services.

In 2016 St. Mary's adult Behavioral Health Unit, with room for twenty patients, was the largest adult inpatient behavioral health unit, in Dane County. "Some of our most vulnerable people are having to leave the county because the bed availability is not there for them," said Journey Mental Health Center CEO Ronald Lampert. That year the hospital announced a substantial expansion and renovation of its adult Behavioral Health Unit facilities.

In 2025 St. Mary's – Madison was rated high performing in 16 adult procedures and conditions by U.S. News & World Report.
