= Desloge, Missouri =

- City
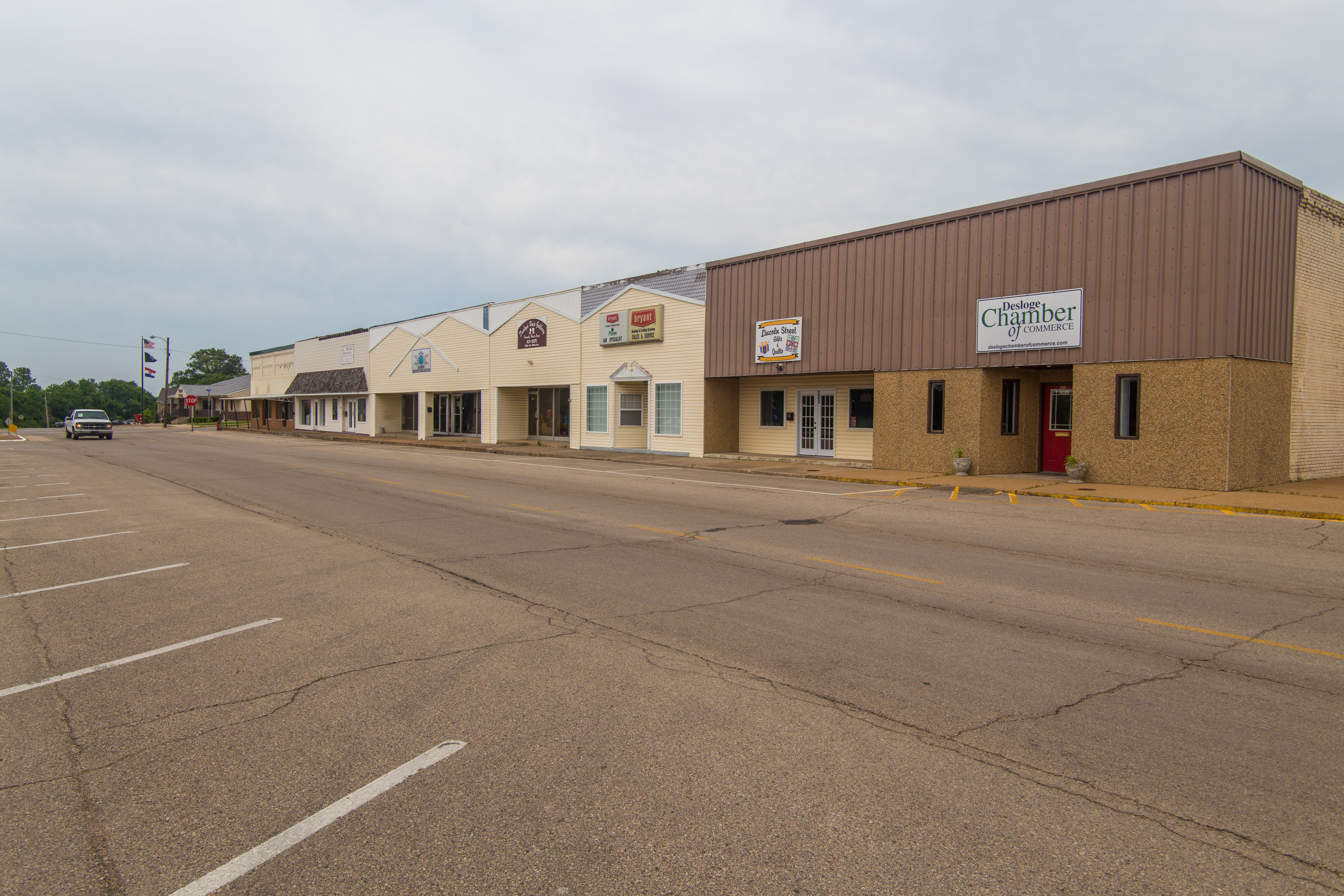
- Desloge, Missouri, May 2019

- Location of Desloge, Missouri
- Coordinates: 37°52′22″N 90°31′14″W
- Country: United States
- State: Missouri
- County: St. Francois
- Incorporated: 1941

Area
  - Total: 2.92 sq mi (7.56 km^{2})
  - Land: 2.92 sq mi (7.56 km^{2})
  - Water: 0 sq mi (0.00 km^{2})
- Elevation: 794 ft (242 m)

Population (2020)
  - Total: 4,823
  - Density: 1,652.8/sq mi (638.15/km^{2})
- Time zone: UTC-6 (Central (CST))
  - Summer (DST): UTC-5 (CDT)
- ZIP code: 63601
- Area code: 573
- FIPS code: 29-19216
- GNIS feature ID: 2394526
- Website: www.desloge-mo.gov

Desloge (/dəˈloʊʒ/ də-LOHZH) is a city in St. Francois County, Missouri, United States. As of the 2020 census, Desloge had a population of 4,823.

== History ==
The city was founded by Firmin V. Desloge II, son of Firmin René Desloge, who migrated from France, settled in Potosi, and began the Desloge Family in America. Firmin V. Desloge II learned about mining from his father and acquired many claims in the area of what is today Desloge and Bonne Terre. A Desloge developed one of his claims just north of Bonne Terre and built a concentrating plant there. After the plant was destroyed by fire in 1883, Desloge explored his properties in the present area of Desloge and consolidated several local mining companies which became known as the Desloge Consolidated Lead Company. In 1887, the land was cleared and company houses for his staff were constructed in an area referred to as "Desloge Town", just west of the present-day railroad tracks. Here, Desloge sank a shaft and built a concentrating plant which began operations in 1892. Desloge Missouri and the regional Southeast Missouri Lead Mining District became one of the principal lead mining centers in the US. In 1929, the family sold the Desloge Consolidated Lead Company to the St. Joe Lead Company.

Firmin Desloge II, who died in 1930, willed to his family the original 47 acres (190,000 m^{2}) of the hand-dug pits of the original lead mining operations and the deeply rutted wagon tracks on a property. The family then donated this land for a park, today named Firmin Desloge Park, and dedicated it to the mining families in the area.

Firmin Desloge moved to St. Louis in the early 1900s. His son, Firmin Desloge III, was superintendent of mines until he moved his family — including his sons Firmin V. Desloge IV, William Livingston Desloge, and Theodore P. Desloge — to St. Louis in 1921.

The city of Desloge was incorporated on March 7, 1941, with D.E. Brown as its first mayor.

In June 2012, three great-great-grandsons of city founder Firmin Desloge II attended a dedication of a bronze medallion donated by great-grandson Steven Rockwell Desloge.

== Services ==
Desloge City Park in the center of town at Parkside and Walnut streets has an Olympic-size swimming pool, tennis courts, picnic tables, barbecue pits, amphitheater, walking/jogging path, and playground equipment. Brightwell Park at Cedar Street and Brightwell Boulevard has three baseball diamonds for little- to senior-league baseball and softball.

=== Community services ===
The City of Desloge Police Department employs 10 people at 1000 North Desloge Drive. Emergency calls are handled by the St. Francois County Joint Communications Center. The City of Desloge Volunteer Fire Department, at 100 Chadrick Street, has a 2000 pumper truck. The City of Desloge Public Works Department at 1000 East Chestnut Street oversees the Municipal Waterworks system, streets and alleys, trash removal, recycling, and city maintenance. Free weekly trash pickup is no longer offered to Desloge residents, they are now forced to pay for the service. A citywide, voluntary, recycling program is also available.

=== Health services ===
The nearest health and medical service providers is BJC Health Systems in Bonne Terre and Farmington.

The osteopathic Mineral Area Regional Medical Center in Farmington closed in January 2016.

=== Education ===
The North St. Francois County R-1 School District serves grades K-12.

Mineral Area College, a two-year community college and the first in the state of Missouri to offer the 2+2 program, offers a four-year degree through Central Methodist University.

The Unitec Career Center offers business and industry training.

The town has a lending library, the Desloge Public Library.

== Geography ==
Desloge is located at 37°52′22″N 90°31′14″W (37.872781, -90.520484).

According to the United States Census Bureau, the city has a total area of 2.90 square miles (7.51 km^{2}), all land.

== Demographics ==
Historical population
Census	Pop.	Note	%±
1950	1,957		—
1960	2,308		17.9%
1970	2,818		22.1%
1980	3,481		23.5%
1990	4,150		19.2%
2000	4,802		15.7%
2010	5,054		5.2%
2020	4,823		−4.6%
U.S. Decennial Census

=== 2020 census ===
As of the 2020 census, Desloge had a population of 4,823. The median age was 40.6 years. 22.0% of residents were under the age of 18 and 18.8% of residents were 65 years of age or older. For every 100 females there were 91.4 males, and for every 100 females age 18 and over there were 89.0 males age 18 and over.

99.3% of residents lived in urban areas, while 0.7% lived in rural areas.

There were 2,030 households in Desloge, of which 29.4% had children under the age of 18 living in them. Of all households, 42.8% were married-couple households, 18.5% were households with a male householder and no spouse or partner present, and 30.0% were households with a female householder and no spouse or partner present. About 32.1% of all households were made up of individuals and 14.1% had someone living alone who was 65 years of age or older.

There were 2,174 housing units, of which 6.6% were vacant. The homeowner vacancy rate was 1.7% and the rental vacancy rate was 7.8%.

Racial composition as of the 2020 census
Race	Number	Percent
White	4,485	93.0%
Black or African American	26	0.5%
American Indian and Alaska Native	7	0.1%
Asian	17	0.4%
Native Hawaiian and Other Pacific Islander	0	0.0%
Some other race	12	0.2%
Two or more races	276	5.7%
Hispanic or Latino (of any race)	62	1.3%

=== 2010 census ===
As of the census of 2010, there were 5,054 people, 2,092 households, and 1,361 families living in the city. The population density was 1,742.8 inhabitants per square mile (672.9/km^{2}). There were 2,274 housing units at an average density of 784.1 per square mile (302.7/km^{2}). The racial makeup of the city was 97.37% White, 0.77% Black or African American, 0.24% Native American, 0.16% Asian, 0.06% from other races, and 1.40% from two or more races. Hispanic or Latino of any race were 1.09% of the population.

There were 2,092 households, of which 34.1% had children under the age of 18 living with them, 44.7% were married couples living together, 15.4% had a female householder with no husband present, 5.0% had a male householder with no wife present, and 34.9% were non-families. 12.7% of households consisted of one person 65 years of age or older. The average household size was 2.37 people and the average family size was 2.89.

The median age in the city was 37.4 years. 24% of residents were under the age of 18; 8.8% were between the ages of 18 and 24; 26.2% were from 25 to 44; 25.2% were from 45 to 64; and 15.7% were 65 years of age or older. The gender makeup of the city was 47.7% male and 52.3% female.

=== 2000 census ===
As of the census of 2000, there were 4,802 people, 1,963 households, and 1,336 families residing in the city. The population density was 1,808.8 inhabitants per square mile (698.4/km^{2}). There were 2,115 housing units at an average density of 796.7 per square mile (307.6/km^{2}). The racial makeup of the city was 98.63% White, 0.10% African American, 0.42% Native American, 0.12% Asian, 0.04% Pacific Islander, 0.12% from other races, and 0.56% from two or more races. Hispanic or Latino of any race were 0.71% of the population.

There were 1,963 households, out of which 33.7% had children under the age of 18 living with them, 49.3% were married couples living together, 15.0% had a female householder with no husband present, and 31.9% were non-families. 27.3% of all households were made up of individuals, and 13.3% had someone living alone who was 65 years of age or older. The average household size was 2.40 and the average family size was 2.90.

In the city the population was spread out, with 25.3% under the age of 18, 10.8% from 18 to 24, 28.3% from 25 to 44, 19.7% from 45 to 64, and 16.0% who were 65 years of age or older. The median age was 35 years. For every 100 females there were 86.8 males. For every 100 females age 18 and over, there were 78.9 males.

The median income for a household in the city was $31,956, and the median income for a family was $40,035. Males had a median income of $35,451 versus $19,599 for females. The per capita income for the city was $16,235. About 6.2% of families and 10.2% of the population were below the poverty line, including 12.3% of those under age 18 and 12.2% of those age 65 or over.
