= Cardinal Glennon Children's Hospital =

Coordinates: 38°37′16″N 90°14′21″W

SSM Health Cardinal Glennon Children's Hospital
- Sisters of St. Mary/SSM Health Care

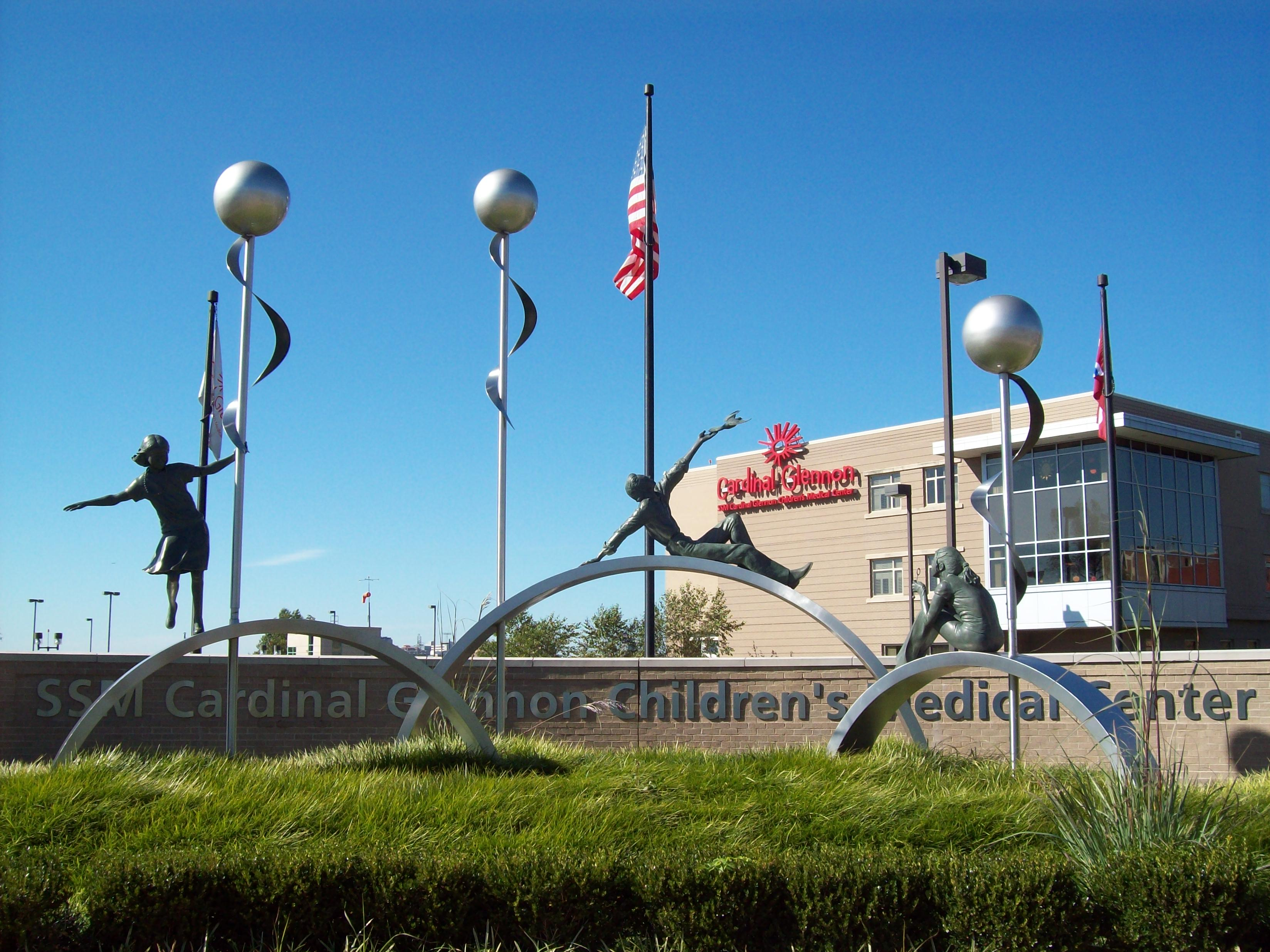

Geography
- Location: 1465 South Grand Boulevard; St. Louis, Missouri, United States

Organization
- Care system: SSM Health
- Type: Pediatric
- Affiliated university: Department of Pediatrics, Saint Louis University School of Medicine

Services
- Emergency department: Level I pediatric trauma center

History
- Founded: 1956; 70 years ago

Links
- Website: http://www.cardinalglennon.com
- Lists: Hospitals in Missouri

SSM Health Cardinal Glennon Children's Hospital is a non-profit 195-bed inpatient and outpatient pediatric medical center in St. Louis, Missouri. Since its founding in 1956, SSM Health Cardinal Glennon has provided care for children regardless of ability to pay. SSM Health Cardinal Glennon primarily serves children from eastern Missouri and southern Illinois, but also treats children across the United States and from countries around the world.

SSM Health Cardinal Glennon also serves as a teaching hospital affiliated with the neighboring Saint Louis University School of Medicine and Nursing, and nine other education institutes. SSM Health Cardinal Glennon is a member of SSM Health, one of the largest Catholic health care systems in the country. SSM Health is sponsored by the Franciscan Sisters of Mary and owns, operates and manages hospitals in four states — Missouri, Illinois, Wisconsin and Oklahoma. In 2002, SSM Health was the first health care organization in the country to be named a Malcolm Baldrige National Quality Award winner.

== History ==
Originally named Cardinal Glennon Memorial Hospital for Children after John Cardinal Glennon the Archbishop of St. Louis from 1903 to 1946, the hospital first opened its doors on July 5, 1956. Dr. Peter G. Danis (father of Timothy J. Danis), Leo Wieck, Frank J. Guyol, and the Franciscan Sisters of Mary were very instrumental regarding the founding of the hospital.

== Departments ==
SSM Health Cardinal Glennon is ranked as one of the top Children's Hospitals in the United States by U.S. News & World Report, ranking in the top 50 hospitals in the United States for their Gastroenterology (#19), Cardiology & Heart Surgery (#32), Neonatology (#46), Cancer Care (#28), Nephrology (#27), Pulmonology & Lung Surgery (#27), and Urology (#48) departments in the 2024-2025 edition. It is home to more than 200 specialists in more than 60 areas of pediatric medical and surgical sub-specialties including cardiology and cardiothoracic surgery, critical care, emergency, ENT, gastroenterology/hepatology, hematology/oncology, neonatology, nephrology, neurology/neurosurgery, orthopedics, plastic surgery and pulmonology. Surgical services include fetal surgery and minimally invasive surgery.

SSM Health Cardinal Glennon, in partnership with Saint Louis University School of Medicine, offers 12 pediatric fellowship programs including allergy and immunology, anesthesia, cardiology, critical care, developmental/behavioral, emergency medicine, gastroenterology, hematology/oncology, neonatal, neurology, surgery and rheumatology. The hospital is home to the Level 1 pediatric trauma center and a Level 4 neonatal intensive care unit, both the highest available classification, and the St. Louis Fetal Care Institute. The St. Louis Fetal Care Institute is the only comprehensive fetal care center in middle America.
