= Saint Louis University Hospital =

Coordinates: 38.6227°N 90.2382°W

- SSM Health Care
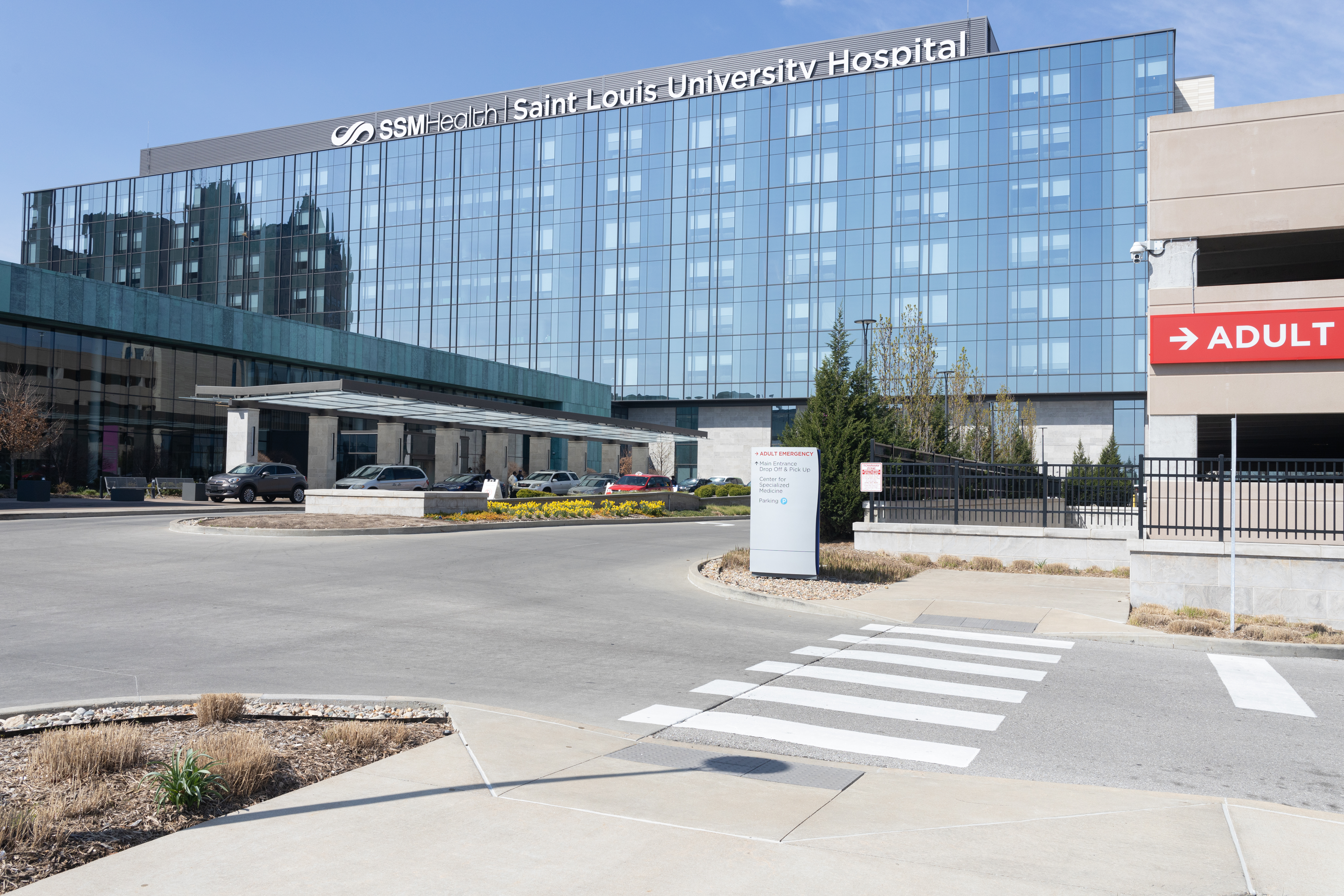

Geography
- Location: St. Louis, Missouri, United States

Organization
- Care system: Private
- Type: Teaching
- Affiliated university: Saint Louis University School of Medicine
- Network: SSM Health Care

Services
- Emergency department: Level I trauma center
- Beds: 400+

Helipads
- Helipad: FAA LID: MO55

History
- Founded: 1933 (as Firmin Desloge Hospital)

Links
- Website: http://www.sluhospital.com/en-US/Pages/default.aspx
- Lists: Hospitals in Missouri

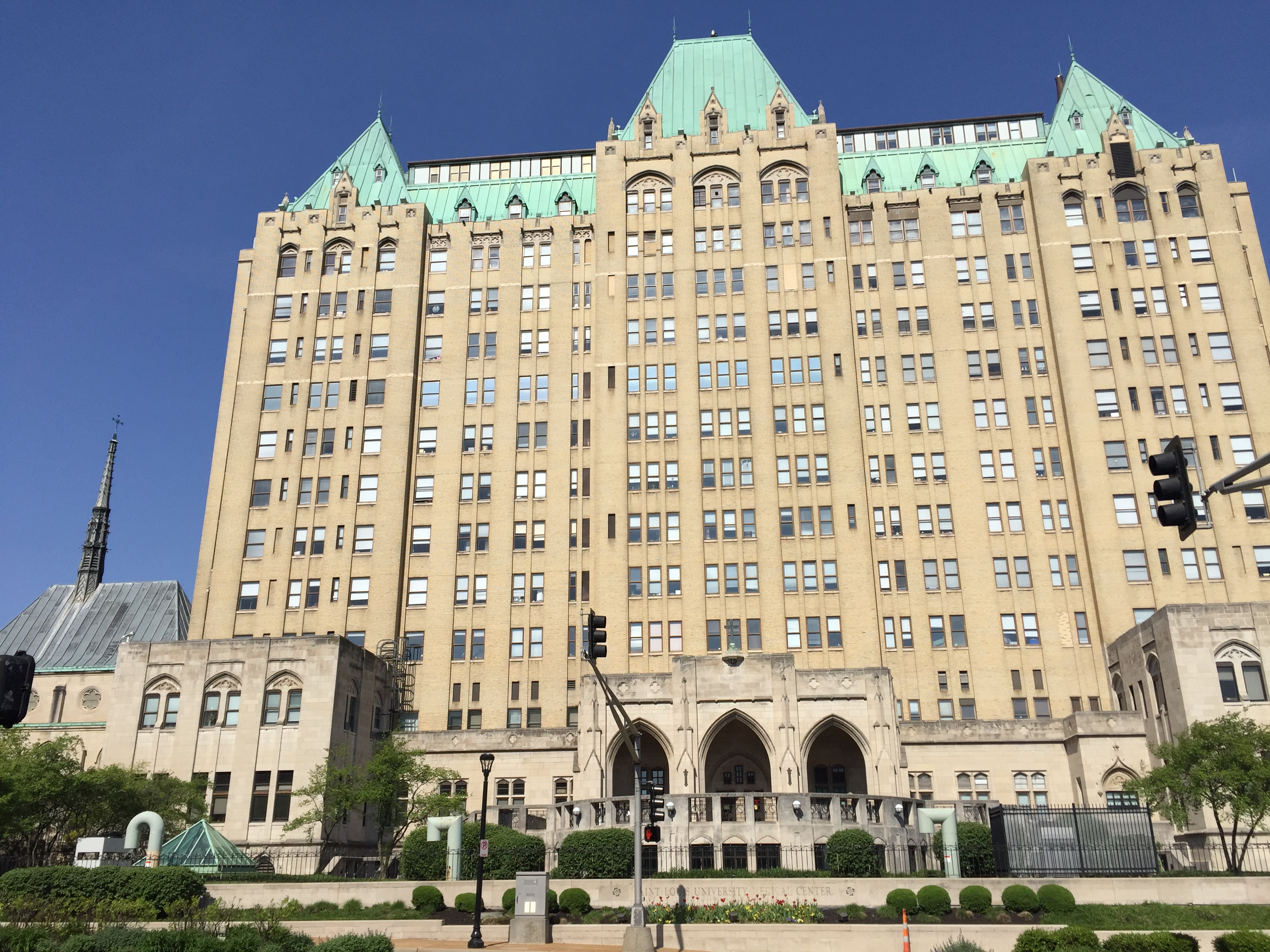
Saint Louis University Hospital (old hospital)

Saint Louis University Hospital (SLU Hospital) is a 356-bed non-profit, research and academic medical center located in St. Louis, Missouri, United States, providing tertiary care for the east Missouri region. The medical center is a part of the SSM Health System and is affiliated with the Saint Louis University School of Medicine. SLUH features an ACS designated adult Level 1 Trauma Center and has a helipad to handle medevac patients.

From 1998 to 2015, this hospital was owned by the for-profit Tenet Healthcare Corporation. In June, 2015, the university announced that it would reacquire the hospital and transfer it to the non-profit Catholic hospital system SSM Health Care in the third quarter of 2015. It serves as the main teaching hospital for the Saint Louis University School of Medicine.

== History ==
Much of the old building was constructed in 1896 as an addition to Firmin Desloge Hospital, which opened in 1933 as a partnership between the Jesuits of Saint Louis University and the Sisters of Saint Mary and named for the benefactor, Firmin V. Desloge.

In February 1930, St. Louis University received a $1 million bequest ($13 million in 2010 dollars) from the estate of Firmin Vincent Desloge a member of the Desloge Family in America, who provided in his will, funds for a hospital to serve St. Louis University and to replace the old St. Mary's Hospital, both in St. Louis.

Continuous growth and the need for modern facilities and equipment resulted in the construction of a new hospital facility as an addition to the original structure. This new part of the hospital was built directly behind the old Firmin Desloge Hospital at a cost of $39.1 million. The first patients moved in on January 30, 1988.

In 1998, the hospital was purchased from Saint Louis University by the Tenet Health System. In 2015, the hospital was bought back by the university and then transferred to SSM Health.

As of October 2015, SSM Health was planning to spend $500 million to rebuild and expand the hospital. Various media reported that the options under consideration include demolishing the 1933 hospital tower; SSM officials say they have not ruled that out. Desloge scion Christopher Desloge has launched an effort to preserve the hospital building and chapel that his family helped build, perhaps by adaptive uses including, for example, a museum to the African American experience in healthcare and nursing in St. Louis.

The preservation of the hospital is supported by the local chapter of the American Institute of Architects, the Les Amis historical organization, and the Landmarks Association of St. Louis, whose executive director said, "In the pantheon of St. Louis architecture and signature buildings, these are really way up there." The executive director also asserted that the building would be "considered eligible for listing in the National Register of Historic Places and classified as "High Merit" under the terms of the St. Louis City Preservation Ordinance (64689)".

In February 2016, a letter urging the hospital's preservation was sent to SSM from 31 groups, including the Landmarks Association, the National Trust for Historic Preservation, Missouri Advisory Council on Historic Preservation, Preservation Research Office, American Institute of Architects, Foundation for Commercial Philanthropy, Sam Fox School of Design & Visual Arts at Washington University in St. Louis, US Representative Russ Carnahan, the Society of Architectural Historians, and numerous neighborhood associations and alderpersons. Separately, the Foundation for Commercial Philanthropy proposed to lease several floors of the tower to a nonprofit incubation center, seek millions of dollars in historic tax credits, and launch a campaign to raise $15 million to $20 million. Desloge and Landmarks Association of St. Louis director Andrew Weil say this would eliminate the financial burden on SSM.

In May 2016, the Landmarks Association called Firmin Desloge Hospital and Chapel the city's most endangered historical buildings.

In September 2016, the St. Louis City Planning & Urban Design Agency’s Planning Commission convened to evaluate SSM's presented plans to save Desloge Tower in which the owners proposed to be rehabbed to accommodate medical offices. "A representative of SSM Health stated that while no decision has been finalized, it is “highly likely” that 15-story French Gothic Revival Desloge tower will be converted to office space".

In November 2016, St. Louis University released to the St. Louis Planning Commission a $750 million redevelopment plan for 400 acres in midtown St. Louis, an area which encompasses Desloge Hospital Tower. Uses within the area include medical and educational uses including offices and training facilities for those in the health care and life sciences; classrooms and related instructional, laboratory, research, hospice, nursery and day care spaces; and pharmacy facilities. Office facilities for private, public and non-profit institutions, businesses and agencies; research facilities. The planning commission unanimously approved the plan. According to the St. Louis Post-Dispatch, the iconic Firmin Desloge tower along Grand Boulevard appears safe for now. The plan doesn't call for tearing it down.

The new hospital opened on a campus adjacent to the old hospital. The hospital opened on August 30, 2020, when SLU staff moved patients from the old hospital to the new hospital.

== Awards ==
It has been recognized by U.S. News & World Report magazine as one of the "Top 10 geriatric Hospitals" in the United States back in the 90s

As of 2020–21, the hospital ranked as High Performing in two specialties on the U.S. News & World Report.

== See also ==
- Saint Louis University
- SSM Health
- Cardinal Glennon Children's Hospital
