= Firmin Desloge Tower =

Building in St. Louis, Missouri

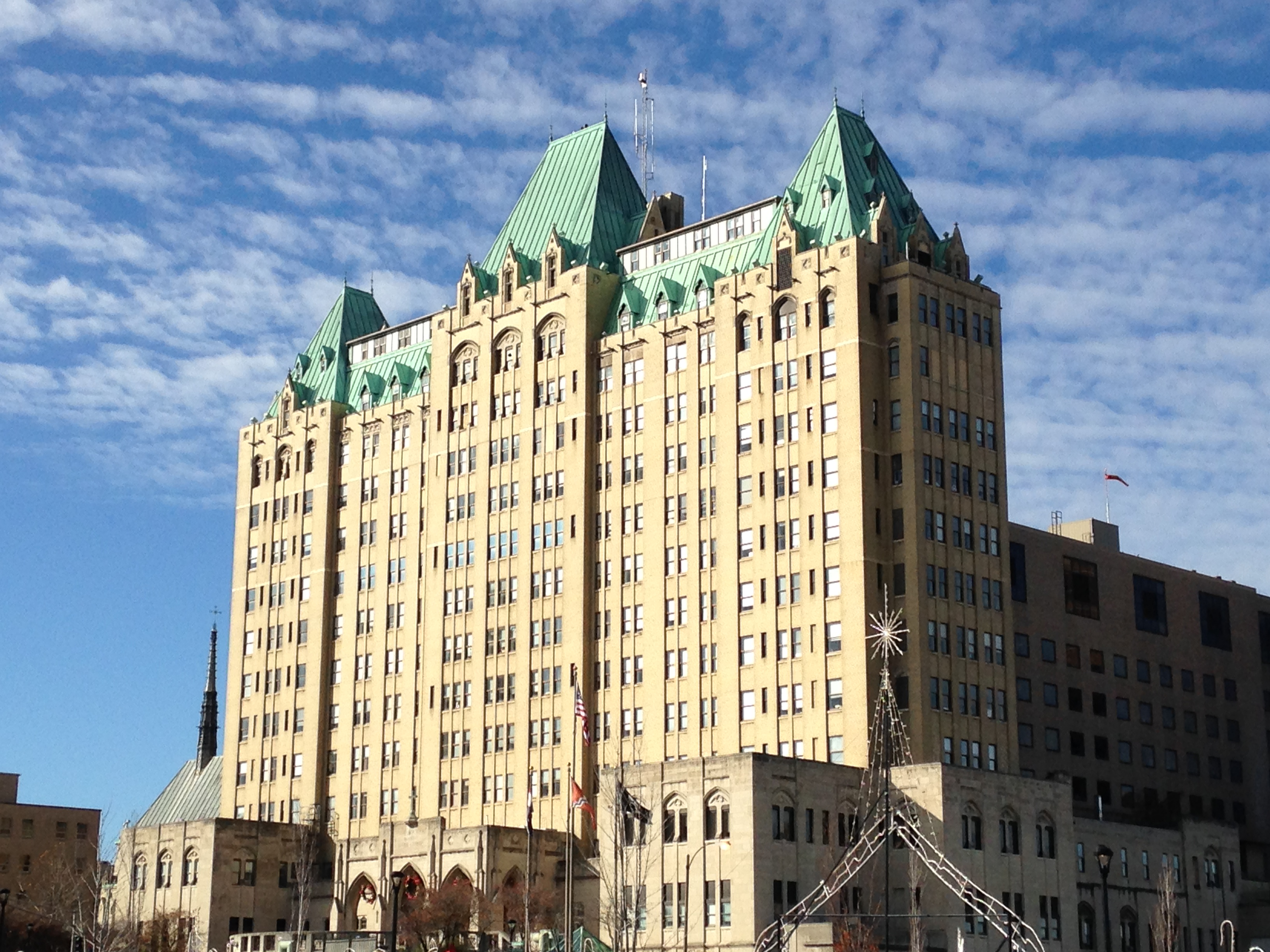
- Firmin Desloge Tower, 2015
- Location in St. Louis
- Former names: Firmin Desloge Hospital

General information
- Architectural style: Gothic Revival
- Location: 3635 Vista Avenue, St. Louis, Missouri, United States
- Coordinates: 38.62290°N 90.23834°W
- Groundbreaking: June 22, 1931
- Inaugurated: November 3, 1933

Design and construction
- Architecture firm: Study, Farrar and Majors, with Arthur Widmer

Firmin Desloge Tower (built as Firmin Desloge Hospital) is a building in St. Louis, Missouri. It was built from 1930 to 1933 on Grand Avenue between Vista Avenue and Rutger Avenue as a hospital operated by the Jesuits of Saint Louis University and the Sisters of Saint Mary for the poor and others in need. It was funded by a donation from lead-mining millionaire Firmin V. Desloge. Administration of the hospital passed to Saint Louis University in the 1950s, and it served as the main building of Saint Louis University Hospital—today, St. Louis University Medical Center—until a new hospital was built and opened in 2020.

== History ==
=== Creation ===
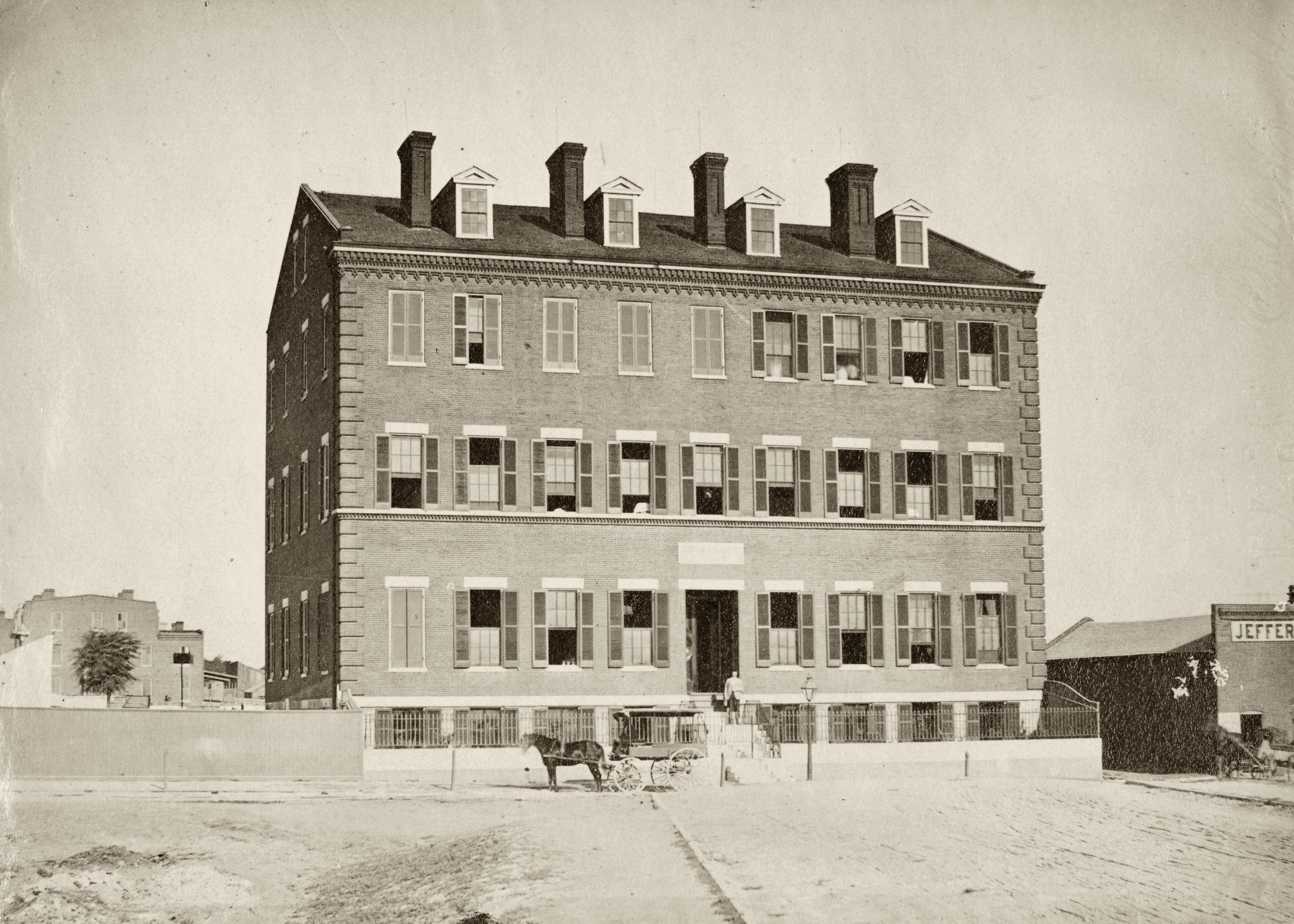

Firmin Desloge plaque

In February 1930, Saint Louis University received a $1 million bequest ($19,272,908 today) from the estate of Firmin Vincent Desloge, a member of the Desloge Family in America, who provided in his will, funds for a hospital to serve St. Louis University and to replace the old St. Mary's Hospital, both in St. Louis. Desloge's wife, Lydia Desloge (née Lydia Holden Davis), donated another $100,000 to build a chapel next to the hospital.

The building was designed by Study, Farrar and Majors, with Arthur Widmer, in the Modern Gothic Revival style. Construction began in the fall of 1930, with an estimated cost of $1.25 million. Archbishop John Glennon formally laid the cornerstone of the hospital on June 22, 1931.

The 250-foot structure rises ten stories above a high basement, and reflects the Modern Gothic Revival style. The basement and first two stories are covered with ashlar limestone, projecting out from the building at the center and end blocks. These projections display Gothic pointed-arched openings and flat, slender pilasters; the central projection has a monumental porch with compound arches. Above this three-story base, the building steps back, its five divisions composed of narrow piers with double hung windows and brick spandrels. The building is crowned by a steeply pitched hipped roof of copper-covered lead, pierced with wall and roof dormers in a variety of configurations.

The building was dedicated on November 3, 1933. At the ceremony, Desloge's son Firmin (III) noted that the roof was covered by lead, the source of the family's fortune, and said, "That’s a good cap on things".

Desloge Chapel at Desloge Hospital

Its chapel, Desloge Chapel, was designed by the Gothic revivalist architect Ralph Adams Cram, appointed with stained glass by Emil Frei and sculpture by John Angel, and consecrated later that year.

=== Operation ===
Operated under the auspices of the Sisters of St. Mary, the new hospital had 206 beds: two-thirds were double-occupancy rooms and the rest private rooms — a departure from the open wards of the day. In keeping with the Desloge family dedication to service and advancement, Firmin Desloge Hospital was also specifically for African Americans, and served as a nursing school for African American women. In 1877 the Sisters of St. Mary established a 150-bed hospital at 1526 Papin called St. Mary's Infirmary for the poor. In 1933, the infirmary was opened to African Americans with African American physicians and a mix of white and African American nurses. Physicians of St. Louis University Medical School served as consultant physicians. The Sisters of St. Mary had a nursing school for African American women at St. Mary's Infirmary. (Author John C. Crichton, cited above, erroneously ascribed the history of St Mary's Infirmary to Firmin Desloge Hospital.)

In 1959, Saint Louis University took over the administration of Firmin Desloge Hospital. The hospital, along with Bordley Memorial Pavilion and the David P. Wohl Sr. Memorial Institute, were collectively renamed Saint Louis University Hospital.

In 1983, the Desloge family gave money to illuminate the peaked copper roof to mark the hospital's fiftieth anniversary.

To expand and improve services, Saint Louis University Hospital built a large addition to the tower for $39.1 million. The first patients moved in on January 30, 1988.

In 1998, Saint Louis University sold the chapel, along with the hospital, to Tenet Healthcare Corp., a for-profit chain based in Dallas.

In 2015, the university repurchased back the hospital, then gave it to SSM Health, a non-profit health care system created by the Franciscan Sisters of Mary, formerly Sisters of Saint Mary. The facility became SSM St. Louis University Hospital.

The building was converted to physician offices and administrative space.

=== Building, imperiled ===
In October 2015, SSM Health announced plans to spend $500 million to rebuild and expand the hospital. Among the options mooted were demolishing the 1933 tower.

Desloge scion Christopher Desloge launched an effort to preserve the hospital building and chapel, perhaps by adaptive uses including, for example, a museum to the African American experience in healthcare and nursing in St. Louis. Support for its preservation was offered by the local chapter of the American Institute of Architects, the Les Amis historical organization, and the Landmarks Association of St. Louis, whose executive director said, "In the pantheon of St. Louis architecture and signature buildings, these are really way up there." The executive director also asserted that the building would be "considered eligible for listing in the National Register of Historic Places and classified as "High Merit" under the terms of the St. Louis City Preservation Ordinance (64689)".

In February 2016, a letter urging the hospital's preservation was sent to SSM from 31 groups, including the Landmarks Association, the National Trust for Historic Preservation, Missouri Advisory Council on Historic Preservation, Preservation Research Office, American Institute of Architects, Foundation for Commercial Philanthropy, Sam Fox School of Design & Visual Arts at Washington University in St. Louis, US Representative Russ Carnahan, the Society of Architectural Historians, and numerous neighborhood associations and alderpersons. Separately, the Foundation for Commercial Philanthropy, a not-for-profit organization of the Christopher Desloge family, proposed to lease several floors of the tower for a nonprofit incubation center, to seek millions of dollars in historic tax credits, and to launch a campaign to raise $15 million to $20 million. Desloge and Landmarks Association of St. Louis director Andrew Weil said this would eliminate the financial burden on SSM.

In May 2016, the Landmarks Association called Firmin Desloge Hospital and Chapel the city's most endangered historical buildings.

In September 2016, the St. Louis City Planning & Urban Design Agency’s Planning Commission convened to evaluate SSM's proposal to rehab Desloge Tower for medical offices.

In November 2016, St. Louis University released to the St. Louis Planning Commission a $750 million redevelopment plan for 400 acres in midtown St. Louis, an area that encompasses Desloge Hospital Tower. Uses within the area include medical and educational uses including offices and training facilities for those in the health care and life sciences; classrooms and related instructional, laboratory, research, hospice, nursery and day care spaces; and pharmacy facilities. Office facilities for private, public and non-profit institutions, businesses and agencies; research facilities. The planning commission unanimously approved the plan. By late 2016, the St. Louis Post-Dispatch reported that the building "appears safe for now. The plan doesn't call for tearing it down.

== Today ==
The building, now called Firmin Desloge Tower, houses medical offices and administrative space.
