= SSM Health =

Healthcare network based in St. Louis, Missouri, United States

- Formation: 1877
- Type: Healthcare provider
- Headquarters: St. Louis, Missouri
- Location(s): 12800 Corporate Hill Drive St. Louis, Missouri 63131 USA
- Services: 23 hospitals
- President and CEO: Laura S. Kaiser
- Staff: Nearly 39,000
- Website: www.ssmhealth.com/system
- Formerly called: SSM Health Care

SSM Health (an initialism of Sisters of Saint Mary) is a Catholic, non-profit United States health care system. It has 11,000 providers and nearly 39,000 employees in four states: Missouri, Illinois, Oklahoma, and Wisconsin.

Based in St. Louis, SSM Health owns hospitals, pediatric medical centers, outpatient centers, clinics, surgery centers, nursing homes, assisted living facilities, physician offices, emergency centers, rehabilitation facilities, urgent care centers, home care, and hospice.

== History ==
In 2012, SSM Health stated that it was 'disappointed with the contraceptive mandate' regarding being legally forced to cover such items by the Affordable Care Act, against Catholic freedom of conscience.

In 2018, SSM rebranded its Oklahoma hospitals from "St. Anthony" to "SSM Health St. Anthony". The health system's physician's group in the state became known as SSM Health Medical Group. Also in 2018, SSM Health acquired Agnesian HealthCare from Fond du Lac, Wisconsin.

== SSM Health Facilities ==
=== Missouri ===
- SSM Health Saint Louis University Hospital
- SSM Health Cardinal Glennon Children's Hospital
- SSM Health DePaul Hospital - Bridgeton
- SSM Health St. Clare Hospital - Fenton
- SSM Health St. Joseph Hospital - Lake Saint Louis
- SSM Health St. Joseph Hospital - St. Charles
- SSM Health St. Joseph Hospital - Wentzville
- SSM Health St. Mary's Hospital - St. Louis
- SSM Health St. Mary's Hospital - Jefferson City

=== Oklahoma ===
- SSM Health St. Anthony Hospital - Oklahoma City - Main Campus
- SSM Health St. Anthony Bone & Joint Hospital (Oklahoma City)
- SSM Health St. Anthony Healthplex East (Oklahoma City)
- SSM Health St. Anthony Healthplex North (Oklahoma City)
- SSM Health St. Anthony Healthplex South (Oklahoma City)
- SSM Health St. Anthony Healthplex Mustang (Oklahoma City metro)
- SSM Health St. Anthony Healthplex El Reno (Oklahoma City metro)
- SSM Health St. Anthony Hospital Shawnee (Oklahoma City metro)
- SSM Health Urgent Care Shawnee (Shawnee)
- SSM Health Urgent Care Harrah (Harrah)
- SSM Health St. Anthony Hospital - Midwest Midwest City, Oklahoma (Oklahoma city metro)
- SSM Health St. Anthony Hospital - Shawnee, Seminole Campus (Seminole)

=== Wisconsin ===
- SSM Health St. Clare Hospital - Baraboo
- SSM Health St. Clare Meadows Care Center Baraboo
- SSM Health St Mary's Hospital - Madison
- SSM Health St. Mary's Care Center - Madison
- SSM Health St. Mary's Hospital - Janesville
- Dean Health Plan - Madison
- SSM Health Dean Medical Group - Madison
- SSM Health St. Agnes Hospital - Fond du Lac
- SSM Health Waupun Memorial Hospital - Waupun
- SSM Health Ripon Community HospitalCenter - Ripon
- SSM Health Monroe Clinic Medical Group
- SSM Health Monroe Hospital
- SSM Health Dean Medical Group - Stoughton
- SSM Health Stoughton Hospital - Stoughton

=== Illinois ===
- SSM Health St. Mary's Hospital - Centralia
- SSM Health Good Samaritan Hospital - Mt. Vernon
