= Jean Ferdinand Rozier =

French-American businessman

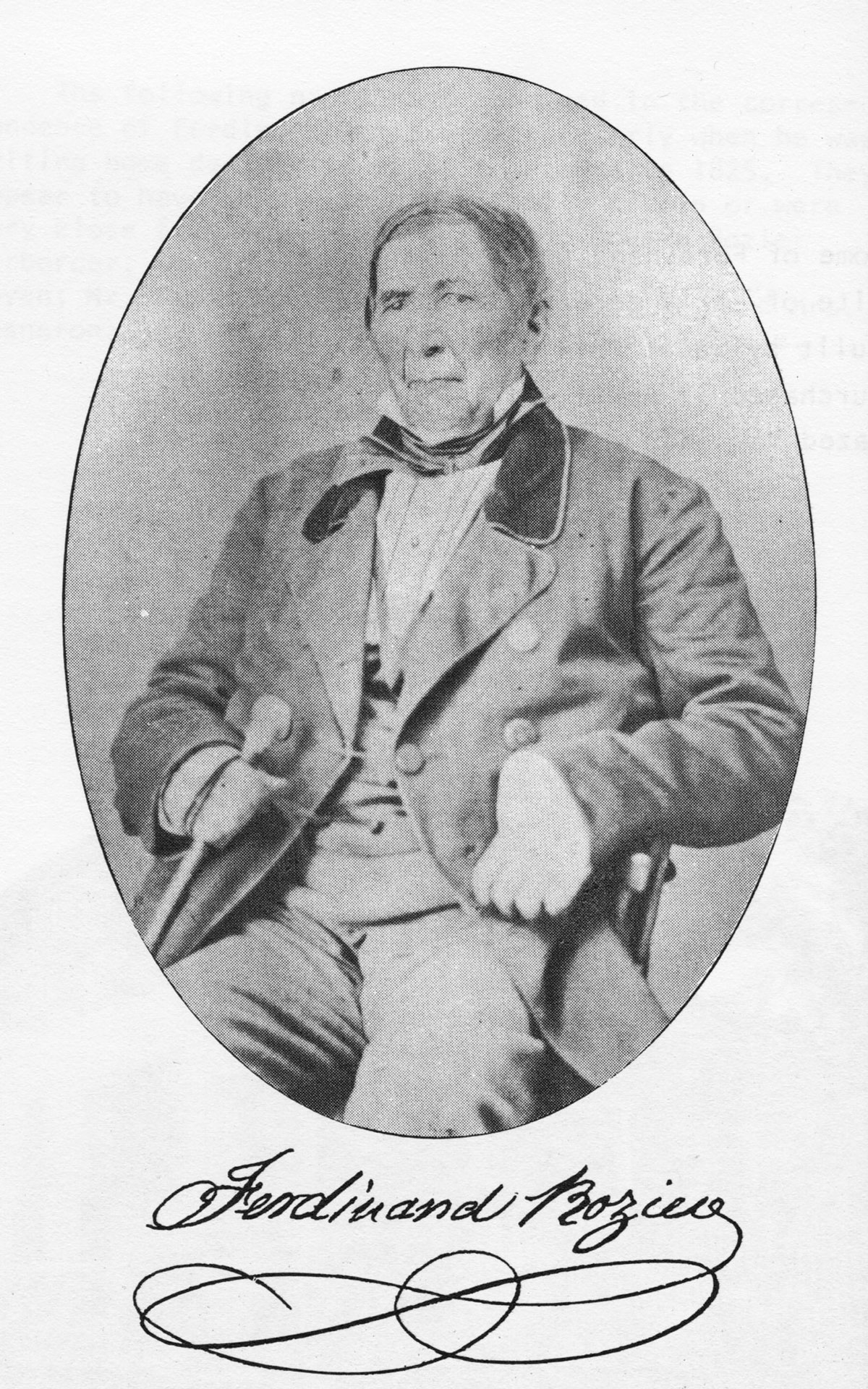
- Born: November 9, 1777; Nantes, France
- Died: January 1, 1864 (aged 86); Ste. Genevieve, Missouri, U.S.
- Occupations: Merchant, Businessman
- Spouse: Constance Pelagie Roy

Jean Ferdinand Rozier (November 9, 1777 – January 1, 1864) was a French-American businessman who partnered with naturalist John James Audubon, a fellow immigrant to the United States, and later with lead mogul Firmin Rene Desloge.

He was born in Nantes, France, to Francois Claude Rozier (November 20, 1739, in Orleans, France – September 6, 1806, in Nantes, France) and Renee Angelique Colas (July 17, 1745 – February 9, 1824). In 1802, he served in the French Navy.

== Partnership with Audubon ==
In 1806, he became business partners with John James Audubon in France:

Nantes, France, March 23, 1806

We, the undersigned, Ferdinand Rozier and John Audubon, who are intending to go to the United States, are agreed to form a partnership in business upon the following conditions:

- Article First: The partnership shall be administered under the joint names of Ferdinand Rozier and John Audubon, and each of us will have the power of signature for all matters of our business only.
- Art. 2.: Upon arrival we will take possession of the farm of Mill Grove, and we call to account Mr. Decosta, who has the power of attorney of Mr. Audubon, Senior. We shall take measures to improve the establishment, or make an investigation of the lead mine discovered, and before continuing the work already begun we will ascertain whether the expenditures made by Sr. Decosta have been, and can still be, advantageous to us. Finally, we shall prepare or attempt to prepare estimates of the expenses, or the products which accrue from these, and we shall undertake nothing upon which we are not both perfectly agreed in principle; consequently we shall both subscribe to the project which we shall decide upon, in order neither of [us] may depart from it, and it shall be the same for all new expenses which might alter the plans that are reached.
- Art. 3.: It is agreed that half the product of this plantation shall be divided between us on a one half basis, and in order to recognize this [profit], as well as the loss, we shall keep a special book for the purpose; on one side shall be entered the items of expense, day by day, and at the moment this is done on the other side [shall also be given] the sales and products of the farms, and all that can result from this business, in such a way that the profit shall always be apparent by the additions of the items which compose the debit and the credit.
- Art. 4.: The house above mentioned Mill Grove farmhouse shall be an object separate from all business, in order that we may control this property as long as we desire. It is agreed that we shall add to the expenses of this exploration those necessary for life, and others of a common character, so long as it shall suit us to live and dwell together.
- Art. 5.: We cannot be prevented from engaging in any other kind of business, but before undertaking it we shall remain six months in order to gather from the country of a kind that would be adventurous to us; we shall then apply ourselves to some commercial occupation, whether inland or maritime.
- Art 6.: We are both at liberty to make any journey in order to procure information for our use, and should it happen that we persuade any merchants to send goods to Mr. Rozier, Senior, we would establish the condition that the benefit which might result from these consignments would be divided between us and Mr. F Rozier, Senior.
- Art. 7.: All the benefits as well as the losses resulting from our commercial transactions shall be divided equally between the partners.
- Art. 8.: The expenses of the journey and others of a common nature shall make the first item of our social expenses.
- Art 9.: We both resolve to maintain friendship and mutual understanding, and we agree very expressly that, upon the least difficulty we shall select one arbitrator, who will be authorized to choose a third, and we promise upon our honor to fully accept the decision that shall be reached, without ever having it in our power to make an appeal from it before any courts.
- Art. 10.: In case of the death of one or the other (which God forbid), the survivor shall have full charge of making a settlement, in order to give an accounting to those entitled to it by law, that is to say to the heirs of the deceased, but the partnership cannot be dissolved until after nine years, counting from the day of the date of this [instrument]. Only in this event, the survivor shall be allowed a commission upon the products of the establishment fixed at ten percent.

Done in duplicate and in good faith between us. Nantes, this 23 March 1806.

(signed) John Audubon

(signed) Ferdinand Rozier

The partners traveled to the United States, and continued the partnership at Audubon's father's property in Pennsylvania. Shipping goods ahead, Audubon and Rozier started a general store in Louisville, Kentucky. Located on the Ohio River, Louisville was the most important port between Pittsburgh and New Orleans. Rozier finally settled in Ste. Genevieve, some 70 miles south of St. Louis in the Louisiana Territory (later to become the Missouri Territory). The village was the first European settlement west of the Mississippi River.

== Partnership dissolved ==
On April 6, 1811, Audubon sold his portion of the business to Rozier in order to continue his studies and art interests. Rozier agreed to pay Audubon $3,000 ($58,050 today): one-third in cash within six months and the rest later.

Audubon wrote:

I John Audubon, having this day mutual consent with Ferdinand Rozier, dissolved and forever closed the partnership and firm of Audubon and Rozier, and having Received from said Ferdinand Rozier payment and notes to the full amount of my part of the goods and debts of the late firm of Audubon and Rozier, I the said John Audubon one of the firm aforesaid do hereby release and forever quit claim to all and any interest which I have or may have in the stock on hand and debts due to the late firm of Audubon and Rozier assign, transfer and set over to said Ferdinand Rozier, all my rights, titles, claims and interest in the goods, merchandise and debts due to the late firm of Audubon and Rozier, and do hereby authorize and empower him for my part, to collect the same in any manner what ever either privately or by suit or suits in law or equity hereby declaring him sole and absolute proprietor and rightful owner of all goods, merchandise and debts of this firm aforesaid, as completely as they were the goods and property of the late firm Audubon and Rozier.

In witness thereof I have set my hand and seal this Sixth day of April 1811

John Audubon Ed D. DeVillamonte

On August 19, 1813, Rozier married Constance Pelagie Roy, in Ste. Genevieve. The daughter of Andre Roy and Constance Barbeauon, she was born October 8, 1795, in Prairie du Rocher, Illinois, and died August 24, 1878, in Ste. Genevieve.

In 1820, Ferdinand Rozier brought his nephew Firmin Rene Desloge to America and into business partnership in Potosi, Missouri, where Desloge founded the famed Desloge Lead Company.
