= Firmin René Desloge =

American businessman (1803–1856)

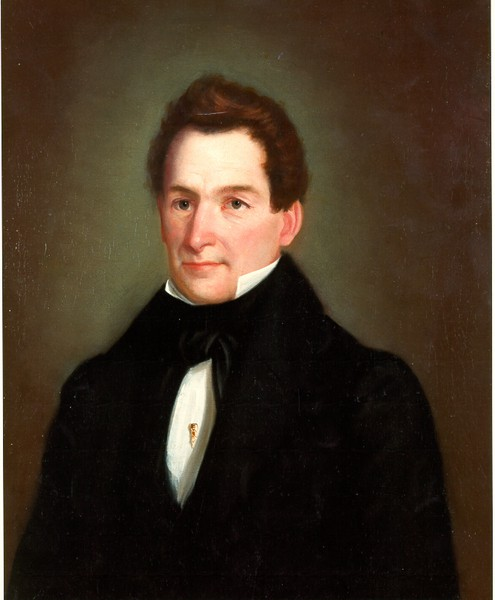
- Born: February 17, 1803; Nantes, France
- Died: July 20, 1856 (aged 53); Potosi, Missouri
- Children: Firmin V. Desloge
- Relatives: Jean Ferdinand Rozier (uncle); François Rozier (great-grandfather)
- Family: Desloge family

Firmin René Desloge (17 February 1803, in Nantes, France – 20 July 1856, in Potosi, Missouri) was a U.S. businessman who founded lead mines and other mercantile businesses. He was the progenitor of the Desloge Family in America, whose Missouri business interests included fur trading, hardware, clothing, lead mining, smelting and ore trading, and distilling.

== Career ==
In 1806, Firmin's uncle Jean Ferdinand Rozier immigrated to the Louisiana Purchase territory of Missouri. He was accompanied by his business partner John James Audubon on a journey funded by Desloge's maternal grandfather, Claude Rozier.

Firmin followed in 1823, and was introduced by his uncle and Audubon to the businesses of fur trading and mercantile interests along the Ohio and Mississippi rivers and lead smelting and mining in Potosi, Missouri. St. Genevieve, a Mississippi River town populated largely by French immigrants and their descendants, was a hub for trading with Indians and new white arrivals to the frontier.

Desloge began to focus on lead mining. He had a nose for lead veins and geology, and began with open-ground diggings, some left open by Native Americans and frustrated miners. He built a smelting furnace around 1824 as an extension of his Potosi mercantile business.

Desloge became a naturalized citizen of Missouri in 1828.

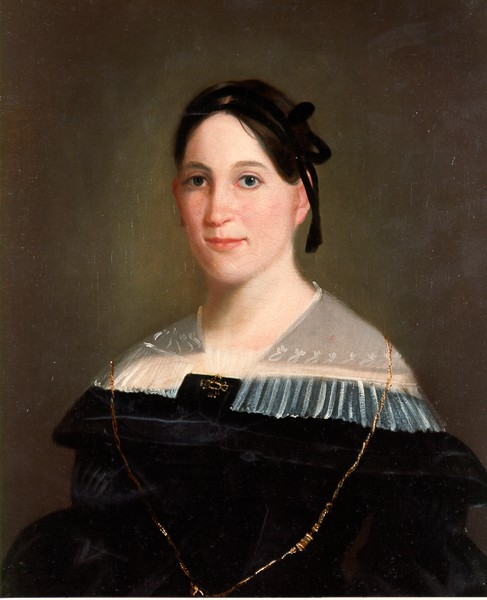
Cynthian MacIlvaine Desloge

His son, Firmin Vincent Desloge, expanded the family mining and mercantile operations, becoming one of the richest men in the world at his death in 1929. Around 1932, Desloge's estate was valued at more than $52 million ($1,227,073,171 today).

== Ancestry ==
Desloge's great-grandfather include nobleman Gildas Alexiz Pitault; François Rozier, a lawyer in the Parliament of Paris, Bailiff of the Forte', Sancerre, Ingra and other jurisdictions of the Bailiwick of Orleans; and Michel Rozier, an officer of the Mint and Marshall of the Minters of the Orléans Mint. His grandfathers included François Claude Rozier, Mayor of Kernegan from August 1789 and Judge of the Tribunal of Commerce from Jan. 23, 1793. Desloge's father, Joseph Giles Desloge, was appointed Mayor of Morlaix by the French First Empire. His uncle (by marriage to his father's sister Marie-Marguerite) was Jean-Baptiste Sollier de la Quillerie, a member of the French king's gendarme.
