= Kaolin (disambiguation) =

Kaolin is a rock rich with kaolinite.

Kaolin may also refer to:

== Music ==
- Kaolin (band), a French rock band from the 2000s

== Places ==
- Kaolin, Pennsylvania
- Kaolin Creek

== See also ==
- Kaolin and morphine, medicinal clay
- Kaolin clotting time, a sensitive test to detect lupus anticoagulants
- Kaolin spray, pest control that has kaolin as the main ingredient
