= Smith Branch =

Smith Branch may refer to:

- Smith Branch (Clear Fork), a stream in Missouri
- Smith Branch (Iron County, Missouri), a stream in Missouri
- Smith Branch (Willow Fork), a stream in Missouri
