= Pike Run =

Pike Run may refer to:

- Pike Run (Missouri), a tributary of the Big River in Missouri, United States
- Pike Run (New Jersey), a tributary of Beden Brook in Somerset County, New Jersey, United States
- Pike Run (Ottawa River tributary), a tributary of the Ottawa River in Ohio
- Pike Run (Juniata River tributary), a tributary of the Juniata River in Pennsylvania
