= Hopewell Creek =

Stream in the American state of Missouri

Location
- Country: United States
- State: Missouri
- County: Washington County

Physical characteristics
- Source
  - location: Washington County, Missouri
  - coordinates: 37°54′15″N 90°43′27″W
- Mouth
  - location: Washington County
  - coordinates: 37°51′48″N 90°40′29″W
  - elevation: 226 m (741 ft)

Hopewell Creek is a stream in eastern Washington County in the U.S. state of Missouri. It is a tributary of the Big River. The stream source area lies southwest of Summit and it flows to the southeast parallel to Missouri Route 8. The village of Hopewell lies adjacent to the stream and Potosi Lake lies to the northeast. The confluence with Big River is about two miles north of Irondale.

Hopewell Creek takes its name from the community of Hopewell which lies along its course.

== See also ==
- List of rivers of Missouri
