= Hazel Run (disambiguation) =

Hazel Run may refer to:

- Hazel Run, Minnesota, a city
- Hazel Run, Missouri, an unincorporated community
- Hazel Run (Terre Bleue Creek), a stream in Missouri
