= Shaw Branch =

Shaw Branch may refer to:

- Shaw Branch (Flat River), a stream in Missouri
- Shaw Branch (Osage River), a stream in Missouri
