= Furnace =

Furnace may refer to:

== Appliances ==
=== Buildings ===
- Furnace (central heating): a furnace, or a heater or boiler, used to generate heat for buildings
- Boiler, used to heat water; also called a furnace in American English when used for heating and hot water in a building
  - Jetstream furnace or Tempest boiler, a design of wood-fired water heater

=== Industry ===
- Industrial furnace, a device used in industrial applications
  - Glass melting furnace
  - Muffle furnace or retort furnace
  - Solar furnace
  - Vacuum furnace
- Metallurgical furnace, a device used to heat metal and metal ore
  - Basic oxygen furnace
  - Bessemer converter
  - Blast furnace
  - Bloomery
  - Electric arc furnace
  - Induction furnace
  - Open hearth furnace
  - Puddling furnace
  - Reverberatory furnace

== Places ==
=== United Kingdom ===
- Furnace, Argyll, Scotland, a village
- Furnace, Carmarthenshire, Wales, a village
- Furnace, Ceredigion, Wales, a village

=== United States ===
- Furnace, California, a former settlement
- Furnace, Indiana, a small town
- Furnace, Kentucky, an unincorporated community
- Furnace, Virginia, an unincorporated community
- Furnace, West Virginia, a former unincorporated community
- Furnace Creek (disambiguation), various streams

== Arts, entertainment and media ==
=== Films ===
- Furnace (film), a 2006 horror film
- The Furnace (1920 film), a film based on the novel The Furnace by "Pan"
- The Furnace (2020 film), an Australian adventure drama film

=== Literature ===
- Furnace: Lockdown, series of books by author Alexander Gordon Smith
- The Furnace (magazine), a literary magazine
- The Furnace, a 1907 novel by Rose Macaulay
- "The Furnace" (short story), by Stephen King

=== Music ===
- Furnace (album), by Download, 1995
- Furnace, a 1972 album by Keith Hudson
- Furnaces (2016), album by Ed Harcourt

== Other uses ==
- HMS Furnace, four ships of the Royal Navy
- Walt Furnace (born 1943), American businessman and politician

== See also ==
- Fire test
- Foundry
- Furness (disambiguation)
- Kiln
- Oil refinery
- Oven
- Smelter
