= Panther Branch (Ottery Creek tributary) =

Stream in the American state of Missouri

Coordinates: 37.664214°N 90.902628°W

Panther Branch is a stream in Kaolin Township, Iron County in the U.S. state of Missouri. It is a tributary of Ottery Creek.

Panther Branch was so named on account of panthers in the area.

== See also ==
- List of rivers of Missouri
