= Pike Run (Missouri) =

Stream in the U.S. state of Missouri

Pike Run is a stream in St. Francois County in the U.S. state of Missouri. It is a tributary of Terre Bleue Creek just upstream of that stream's confluence with Big River.

The stream headwaters arise just south of Missouri Route Y about 1.5 miles southeast of Halifax and US Route 67. The stream flows southwest passing just east of St. Francois State Park and on to its confluence with Terre Bleue Creek about two miles west of the community of Hazel Run. The source area is at 37°59′56″N 90°28′37″W and the confluence is at 37°56′46″N 90°30′03″W.

Pike Run was so named on account of its stock of pike fish.

== See also ==
- List of rivers of Missouri
