= List of countries by electronics exports =

The following is a list of countries by exports of electronics, including parts thereof (Harmonized System code 85).

== International Trade Centre ==
Data is for 2024, in thousands of United States dollars and tons/units.

List of countries by electronic exports (2024)
Country	Value exported (thousands USD)	Value imported (thousands USD)	Trade balance (thousands USD)
World	3,511,088,775	3,696,886,097	−185,797,322
China	887,347,647	546,336,292	341,011,355
Hong Kong	356,656,935	361,448,773	−4,791,838
Taiwan	217,795,432	132,133,773	85,661,659
United States	212,082,342	483,468,627	−271,386,285
South Korea	194,523,661	120,722,969	73,800,692
Vietnam	177,619,881	123,273,239	54,346,642
Singapore	175,202,468	143,614,141	31,588,327
Germany	173,073,395	189,853,633	−16,780,238
Malaysia	120,295,667	85,284,103	35,011,564
Mexico	107,751,693	131,925,751	−24,174,058
Japan	99,072,524	103,622,777	−4,550,253
Netherlands	63,534,562	71,268,319	−7,733,757
Czech Republic	53,652,994	51,081,517	2,571,477
Thailand	50,485,293	64,367,346	−13,882,053
France	46,420,002	66,317,073	−19,897,071
Italy	45,804,053	49,668,920	−3,864,867
Poland	44,526,390	45,622,804	−1,096,414
India	39,979,576	81,220,850	−41,241,274
Hungary	39,370,644	30,702,182	8,668,462
Philippines	36,301,415	27,448,434	8,852,981
United Kingdom	30,031,256	71,590,935	−41,559,679
Austria	22,778,657	24,774,645	−1,995,988
Belgium	21,737,886	30,125,823	−8,387,937
Spain	21,637,996	39,234,991	−17,596,995
Sweden	17,971,265	23,946,414	−5,975,149
Romania	17,958,392	19,721,902	−1,763,510
Slovakia	17,943,734	21,975,556	−4,031,822
Canada	17,316,854	51,840,325	−34,523,471
Turkey	16,412,333	26,449,495	−10,037,162
Switzerland	15,064,151	17,109,520	−2,045,369
Indonesia	14,706,661	26,350,572	−11,643,911
Ireland	14,616,639	14,070,440	546,199
Israel	13,158,959	12,078,658	1,080,301
Denmark	10,136,330	12,023,464	−1,887,134
Morocco	9,639,044	6,970,510	2,668,534
Saudi Arabia	7,947,863	25,958,181	−18,010,318
Finland	7,713,701	9,224,506	−1,510,805
Portugal	7,565,149	11,177,250	−3,612,101
Slovenia	5,747,924	4,658,176	1,089,748
Tunisia	5,629,453	3,318,250	2,311,203
Bulgaria	5,167,243	5,941,901	−774,658
Serbia	4,848,180	3,932,644	915,536
Brazil	4,755,759	29,476,133	−24,720,374
Australia	4,198,126	31,269,297	−27,071,171
United Arab Emirates	4,046,053	46,312,396	−42,266,343
Norway	3,824,013	9,386,062	−5,562,049
Lithuania	3,280,337	4,154,159	−873,822
Egypt	3,003,756	6,239,569	−3,235,813
Estonia	2,970,844	2,965,383	5,461
Croatia	2,575,210	3,473,336	−898,126
Greece	2,445,074	6,758,470	−4,313,396
South Africa	2,289,536	9,711,593	−7,422,057
Latvia	2,130,771	2,480,018	−349,247
Russia	1,957,138	20,397,682	−18,440,544
Cambodia	1,874,992	1,922,331	−47,339
North Macedonia	1,719,611	1,560,294	159,317
Panama	1,676,375	2,585,258	−908,883
Ukraine	1,535,190	9,522,435	−7,987,245
Honduras	1,402,052	1,082,919	319,133
Kazakhstan	1,276,317	5,360,036	−4,083,719
Dominican Republic	1,201,684	2,369,035	−1,167,351
Malta	1,127,970	1,140,030	−12,060
Armenia	1,076,273	1,595,824	−519,551
Colombia	994,307	6,082,451	−5,088,144
New Zealand	955,394	4,305,680	−3,350,286
Laos	920,024	725,762	194,262
Costa Rica	838,233	2,290,025	−1,451,792
Bosnia and Herzegovina	830,149	1,043,286	−213,137
Nicaragua	778,589	811,735	−33,146
Luxembourg	666,600	1,357,575	−690,975
Chile	589,213	7,551,157	−6,961,944
Moldova	579,323	928,363	−349,040
Uzbekistan	391,761	5,369,590	−4,977,829
Paraguay	374,605	2,989,897	−2,615,292
El Salvador	367,737	1,179,279	−811,542
Kuwait	312,543	3,385,773	−3,073,230
Myanmar	310,619	448,076	−137,457
Sri Lanka	294,143	1,148,840	−854,697
Albania	274,672	724,930	−450,258
Belarus	233,630	1,336,433	−1,102,803
Oman	215,824	1,858,836	−1,643,012
Macao	183,705	1,744,818	−1,561,113
Botswana	173,834	419,603	−245,769
Ecuador	173,124	2,268,700	−2,095,576
Lebanon	160,041	639,931	−479,890
Cyprus	154,775	743,292	−588,517
Peru	143,245	4,608,257	−4,465,012
Kyrgyzstan	140,123	625,663	−485,540
Guatemala	115,989	2,693,574	−2,577,585
Kenya	104,802	1,141,046	−1,036,244
Uruguay	94,439	908,354	−813,915
Pakistan	92,794	6,173,034	−6,080,240
Qatar	89,428	2,143,581	−2,054,153
Côte d'Ivoire	88,437	726,518	−638,081
Namibia	87,262	538,406	−451,144
Bahrain	80,711	860,750	−780,039
Trinidad and Tobago	63,110	593,365	−530,255
Yemen	61,191	414,279	−353,088
Bangladesh	58,268	3,450,064	−3,391,796
Zambia	56,916	477,190	−420,274
Iceland	56,067	1,126,940	−1,070,873
Jordan	55,080	1,155,412	−1,100,332
Argentina	52,355	5,901,128	−5,848,773
Azerbaijan	48,059	1,712,437	−1,664,378
Georgia	44,456	972,226	−927,770
Lesotho	43,760	120,384	−76,624
Senegal	43,537	693,126	−649,589
Venezuela	42,511	1,398,329	−1,355,818
Andorra	41,825	113,835	−72,010
Iran	34,520	1,409,842	−1,375,322
Tanzania	34,268	1,018,307	−984,039
Mauritius	32,053	427,321	−395,268
Cayman Islands	31,809	85,923	−54,114
Angola	30,306	934,119	−903,813
Nigeria	30,164	4,388,185	−4,358,021
Fiji	26,118	270,752	−244,634
Guyana	22,364	442,479	−420,115
Eswatini	21,940	87,084	−65,144
Algeria	21,690	2,734,717	−2,713,027
Suriname	21,689	199,050	−177,361
Sierra Leone	21,108	199,472	−178,364
Brunei	19,217	157,700	−138,483
Bolivia	17,170	514,313	−497,143
Uganda	17,133	628,879	−611,746
Mongolia	15,997	912,320	−896,323
Zimbabwe	15,976	569,614	−553,638
Cameroon	14,370	781,240	−766,870
Ghana	13,825	1,501,769	−1,487,944
Montenegro	13,328	288,904	−275,576
British Virgin Islands	13,206	25,003	−11,797
Samoa	12,843	29,724	−16,881
Bahamas	12,810	402,281	−389,471
Togo	10,277	156,643	−146,366
Ethiopia	10,021	1,114,320	−1,104,299
Curaçao	9,643	193,240	−183,597
Saint Kitts and Nevis	9,492	28,753	−19,261
Mozambique	9,455	546,475	−537,020
Afghanistan	8,701	356,852	−348,151
Jamaica	8,629	364,018	−355,389
Mali	8,435	526,502	−518,067
Central African Republic	8,261	84,827	−76,566
Haiti	7,832	142,042	−134,210
North Korea	7,690	3,447	4,243
Burkina Faso	6,840	409,036	−402,196
Tokelau	6,674	2,077	4,597
Iraq	6,155	4,188,135	−4,181,980
New Caledonia	5,992	96,773	−90,781
Barbados	5,877	133,265	−127,388
Rwanda	5,531	261,286	−255,755
Libya	5,184	1,231,569	−1,226,385
United States Minor Outlying Islands	4,574	68,620	−64,046
Somalia	4,414	165,629	−161,215
Faroe Islands	4,341	108,836	−104,495
Djibouti	4,267	396,986	−392,719
Turkmenistan	4,148	460,012	−455,864
Papua New Guinea	4,077	349,613	−345,536
Greenland	3,984	52,249	−48,265
Montserrat	3,824	1,964	1,860
Benin	3,813	198,332	−194,519
Nepal	3,774	766,494	−762,720
Madagascar	3,704	301,235	−297,531
Congo	3,584	423,096	−419,512
Dominica	3,430	14,221	−10,791
Malawi	3,323	188,479	−185,156
Solomon Islands	3,283	45,458	−42,175
Nauru	3,146	8,298	−5,152
Micronesia	3,105	12,020	−8,915
Antigua and Barbuda	3,090	50,993	−47,903
Gabon	2,900	189,403	−186,503
Grenada	2,859	45,505	−42,646
Aruba	2,843	83,374	−80,531
DR Congo	2,481	1,112,472	−1,109,991
Liberia	2,324	204,636	−202,312
Bhutan	2,274	197,261	−194,987
Guinea	2,233	582,310	−580,077
Tajikistan	2,165	425,849	−423,684
Niger	2,009	85,172	−83,163
Timor-Leste	1,850	80,667	−78,817
Sao Tome and Principe	1,632	9,364	−7,732
Cuba	1,567	383,187	−381,620
French Southern and Antarctic Territories	1,528	3,810	−2,282
Sudan	1,345	205,988	−204,643
Bermuda	1,310	61,208	−59,898
Saint Lucia	1,053	30,461	−29,408
Comoros	1,039	17,767	−16,728
Chad	989	192,326	−191,337
Bonaire, Sint Eustatius and Saba	920	14,031	−13,111
Saint Helena	833	10,604	−9,771
Anguilla	785	7,215	−6,430
Cocos (Keeling) Islands	755	2,132	−1,377
Gibraltar	738	25,159	−24,421
Burundi	715	68,089	−67,374
Cook Islands	689	6,902	−6,213
Equatorial Guinea	677	77,116	−76,439
Sint Maarten (Dutch part)	674	20,741	−20,067
Marshall Islands	609	53,644	−53,035
Palestine	600	65,094	−64,494
Turks and Caicos Islands	594	27,295	−26,701
Saint Vincent and the Grenadines	556	27,622	−27,066
Tonga	539	23,794	−23,255
Seychelles	538	84,814	−84,276
Tuvalu	522	3,434	−2,912
Mauritania	519	177,439	−176,920
Vanuatu	510	27,562	−27,052
Guinea-Bissau	507	20,590	−20,083
Palau	495	5,145	−4,650
Belize	478	101,467	−100,989
Kiribati	429	10,994	−10,565
Christmas Island	428	1,953	−1,525
British Indian Ocean Territory	423	3,246	−2,823
Eritrea	316	34,161	−33,845
Pitcairn	305	29	276
French Polynesia	299	126,869	−126,570
Falkland Islands	266	10,144	−9,878
Niue	262	8,241	−7,979
Syria	238	132,232	−131,994
Saint Pierre and Miquelon	215	4,615	−4,400
South Sudan	155	61,167	−61,012
Northern Mariana Islands	139	2,958	−2,819
Maldives	129	319,678	−319,549
Norfolk Island	66	1,624	−1,558
Gambia	40	29,464	−29,424
Wallis and Futuna	25	3,226	−3,201
Western Sahara	16	236	−220

== Observatory of Economic Complexity ==
Data is for 2023, in United States dollars.

List of countries by electronic exports
Country	Trade value
China	1,008,598,345,980
Taiwan	243,025,268,962
South Korea	204,611,743,139
Vietnam	183,731,043,121
United States	181,820,190,731
Germany	175,898,808,738
Malaysia	123,879,571,478
Japan	117,373,785,105
Mexico	109,728,227,934
Singapore	95,528,778,454
Thailand	62,572,016,926
Netherlands	58,135,920,663
Philippines	50,858,319,718
France	47,826,891,584
Czech Republic	47,531,812,789
Italy	42,616,808,653
Poland	41,587,087,854
Hungary	41,185,611,145
Hong Kong	39,259,861,632
India	37,382,598,999
United Arab Emirates	26,904,982,122
United Kingdom	26,604,826,020
Spain	22,813,769,525
Austria	20,225,631,575
Romania	19,462,974,178
Ireland	19,411,125,388
Indonesia	18,133,291,184
Slovakia	17,461,069,952
Canada	15,842,169,678
Turkey	15,741,209,170
Israel	15,503,289,609
Sweden	15,036,924,075
Belgium	14,750,641,352
Switzerland	14,277,728,194
Morocco	9,162,549,338
Denmark	8,414,582,114
Finland	8,032,544,453
Portugal	7,520,164,427
Tunisia	6,646,324,549
Slovenia	5,896,919,520
Serbia	5,344,835,851
Bulgaria	5,212,592,718
Brazil	4,707,629,719
Cambodia	3,636,860,349
Egypt	3,017,481,543
Australia	3,013,622,064
Estonia	3,011,287,684
Norway	2,920,205,566
Lithuania	2,784,735,082
Greece	2,288,499,365
Croatia	2,274,339,923
South Africa	2,055,780,531
Latvia	2,043,329,474
Costa Rica	1,970,260,099
Ukraine	1,894,317,770
Russia	1,809,229,760
Malta	1,688,217,667
Saudi Arabia	1,628,596,545
North Macedonia	1,526,319,047
Dominican Republic	1,422,565,087
Honduras	1,377,488,957
Kazakhstan	1,178,821,222
Armenia	1,007,744,170
New Zealand	891,840,367
Nicaragua	866,864,783
Bosnia and Herzegovina	863,240,343
Moldova	829,770,210
Colombia	821,057,365
Oman	816,798,700
Luxembourg	803,148,261
Sri Lanka	448,321,661
Laos	389,183,689
Macau	387,295,360
Paraguay	340,968,381
Chile	334,457,639
Uzbekistan	329,069,219
Myanmar	317,934,639
El Salvador	308,912,927
Albania	287,193,772
Jordan	285,555,608
Qatar	239,335,790
Kuwait	237,380,906
Bahrain	235,782,928
Cyprus	220,616,897
Belarus	216,437,629
Botswana	177,166,971
Lebanon	166,775,498
Kyrgyzstan	164,363,661
Ecuador	155,278,618
Peru	146,454,002
Panama	133,480,299
Argentina	127,766,086
Iceland	118,575,722
Guatemala	101,832,902
Uruguay	101,261,350
Kenya	100,429,608
Pakistan	95,852,707
Venezuela	75,246,425
Bangladesh	73,195,105
Nigeria	66,953,900
Zambia	61,257,650
Yemen	60,246,482
Andorra	50,284,454
Mauritius	47,938,898
Azerbaijan	47,754,241
Senegal	46,725,156
Lesotho	42,188,905
Gabon	41,251,206
Namibia	39,819,956
Tanzania	36,762,991
Cote d'Ivoire	34,196,887
Curacao	31,198,987
Georgia	27,944,839
Iran	27,853,570
Samoa	27,459,919
Fiji	25,721,315
Mozambique	24,589,846
Algeria	24,298,532
Uganda	24,233,267
Bolivia	23,659,802
North Korea	21,572,978
Togo	19,894,248
Brunei	19,644,176
Zimbabwe	17,884,071
Montenegro	17,529,167
Trinidad and Tobago	17,072,464
Ghana	16,320,038
Bahamas	15,418,333
Jamaica	13,576,477
Haiti	13,201,923
Iraq	12,310,628
Ethiopia	11,978,096
Sierra Leone	11,749,597
Seychelles	11,590,360
Eswatini	10,987,419
Cayman Islands	10,737,913
Burkina Faso	9,867,029
Cameroon	9,851,967
Mauritania	9,834,770
Saint Kitts and Nevis	9,644,491
Guinea	9,369,188
Papua New Guinea	8,838,365
Libya	8,787,472
Djibouti	7,779,819
Belize	6,666,428
Madagascar	6,101,987
Mali	5,794,355
French Polynesia	5,521,701
Gambia	5,462,917
Malawi	5,370,347
Benin	5,349,971
Tokelau	4,781,640
Somalia	4,596,020
Aruba	4,541,807
San Marino	4,233,651
Mongolia	4,190,004
DR Congo	4,077,073
Niger	4,063,404
Rwanda	3,530,927
Dominica	3,503,502
Angola	3,499,328
Suriname	3,321,858
Antigua and Barbuda	3,308,994
Turkmenistan	3,258,230
British Virgin Islands	3,181,909
Afghanistan	3,134,246
Nepal	2,961,648
Congo	2,863,600
New Caledonia	2,802,927
Solomon Islands	2,576,407
Liberia	2,544,264
Greenland	2,463,738
American Samoa	2,417,864
Barbados	2,403,104
Cape Verde	2,147,101
Cuba	1,919,713
Sudan	1,791,408
Maldives	1,535,464
Bhutan	1,393,322
Guyana	1,231,651
Timor-Leste	1,143,673
Tuvalu	1,141,637
Turks and Caicos Islands	1,133,435
Christmas Island	1,012,210
Saint Lucia	992,613
Anguilla	991,402
Tajikistan	978,499
Central African Republic	957,815
Equatorial Guinea	936,867
Tonga	867,101
Saint Martin	851,026
Comoros	842,740
Montserrat	820,209
Cocos (Keeling) Islands	795,680
Nauru	755,682
Saint Vincent and the Grenadines	751,332
Chad	686,525
Wallis and Futuna	677,322
Northern Mariana Islands	627,365
Grenada	612,318
Palestine	603,955
Sao Tome and Principe	594,587
Gibraltar	587,418
Saint Helena	580,828
Vanuatu	476,465
Syria	472,008
Bermuda	466,952
Cook Islands	412,011
Falkland Islands	391,285
Marshall Islands	386,355
Micronesia	364,958
Guam	321,678
Kiribati	272,807
Bonaire	260,304
Saint Barthelemy	235,168
Guinea-Bissau	227,784
British Indian Ocean Territory	225,317
Palau	205,121
French South Antarctic Territory	189,906
South Sudan	150,921
Niue	147,701
Eritrea	146,035
Norfolk Island	96,045
Burundi	60,419
Pitcairn Islands	54,402
Saint Pierre and Miquelon	52,287

== Top exporters of different electronics products ==
The five largest exporters of different electronics goods in 2022:

Product category (code)	Global Exports (in millions USD)	Rank	Country	Exports (in millions USD)
Electric motors and generators (excl. generating sets) (8501)	67,555	1	China	15,862
Electric motors and generators (excl. generating sets) (8501)	67,555	2	Germany	8,623
Electric motors and generators (excl. generating sets) (8501)	67,555	3	Mexico	4,623
Electric motors and generators (excl. generating sets) (8501)	67,555	4	United States	4,563
Electric motors and generators (excl. generating sets) (8501)	67,555	5	Japan	3,742
Electric generating sets and rotary converters (8502)	22,393	1	China	6,188
Electric generating sets and rotary converters (8502)	22,393	2	Germany	2,721
Electric generating sets and rotary converters (8502)	22,393	3	United States	1,966
Electric generating sets and rotary converters (8502)	22,393	4	Denmark	1,436
Electric generating sets and rotary converters (8502)	22,393	5	United Kingdom	899
Parts suitable for use solely or principally with electric motors and generators, electric generating sets and rotary converters (8503)	26,337	1	China	7,760
Parts suitable for use solely or principally with electric motors and generators, electric generating sets and rotary converters (8503)	26,337	2	Germany	2,213
Parts suitable for use solely or principally with electric motors and generators, electric generating sets and rotary converters (8503)	26,337	3	Japan	1,632
Parts suitable for use solely or principally with electric motors and generators, electric generating sets and rotary converters (8503)	26,337	4	Italy	1,329
Parts suitable for use solely or principally with electric motors and generators, electric generating sets and rotary converters (8503)	26,337	5	United States	1,240
Electrical transformers, static converters, e.g. rectifiers, and inductors; parts thereof (8504)	149,400	1	China	49,280
Electrical transformers, static converters, e.g. rectifiers, and inductors; parts thereof (8504)	149,400	2	Germany	12,492
Electrical transformers, static converters, e.g. rectifiers, and inductors; parts thereof (8504)	149,400	3	Hong Kong	10,271
Electrical transformers, static converters, e.g. rectifiers, and inductors; parts thereof (8504)	149,400	4	United States	7,335
Electrical transformers, static converters, e.g. rectifiers, and inductors; parts thereof (8504)	149,400	5	Vietnam	5,290
Electromagnets (excl. magnets for medical use); permanent magnets and articles intended to become permanent magnets after magnetization; electromagnetic or permanent magnet chucks, clamps and similar holding devices; electromagnetic couplings, clutches and brakes; electromagnetic lifting heads; parts thereof (8505)	12,726	1	China	5,903
Electromagnets (excl. magnets for medical use); permanent magnets and articles intended to become permanent magnets after magnetization; electromagnetic or permanent magnet chucks, clamps and similar holding devices; electromagnetic couplings, clutches and brakes; electromagnetic lifting heads; parts thereof (8505)	12,726	2	Germany	1,230
Electromagnets (excl. magnets for medical use); permanent magnets and articles intended to become permanent magnets after magnetization; electromagnetic or permanent magnet chucks, clamps and similar holding devices; electromagnetic couplings, clutches and brakes; electromagnetic lifting heads; parts thereof (8505)	12,726	3	Japan	1,169
Electromagnets (excl. magnets for medical use); permanent magnets and articles intended to become permanent magnets after magnetization; electromagnetic or permanent magnet chucks, clamps and similar holding devices; electromagnetic couplings, clutches and brakes; electromagnetic lifting heads; parts thereof (8505)	12,726	4	Vietnam	507
Electromagnets (excl. magnets for medical use); permanent magnets and articles intended to become permanent magnets after magnetization; electromagnetic or permanent magnet chucks, clamps and similar holding devices; electromagnetic couplings, clutches and brakes; electromagnetic lifting heads; parts thereof (8505)	12,726	5	United States	467
Primary cells and primary batteries, electrical; parts thereof (excl. spent) (8506)	9,008	1	China	2,631
Primary cells and primary batteries, electrical; parts thereof (excl. spent) (8506)	9,008	2	United States	840
Primary cells and primary batteries, electrical; parts thereof (excl. spent) (8506)	9,008	3	Singapore	706
Primary cells and primary batteries, electrical; parts thereof (excl. spent) (8506)	9,008	4	Belgium	514
Primary cells and primary batteries, electrical; parts thereof (excl. spent) (8506)	9,008	5	Indonesia	510
Electric accumulators, incl. separators therefor, whether or not square or rectangular; parts thereof (excl. spent and those of unhardened rubber or textiles) (8507)	131,489	1	China	57,228
Electric accumulators, incl. separators therefor, whether or not square or rectangular; parts thereof (excl. spent and those of unhardened rubber or textiles) (8507)	131,489	2	South Korea	9,982
Electric accumulators, incl. separators therefor, whether or not square or rectangular; parts thereof (excl. spent and those of unhardened rubber or textiles) (8507)	131,489	3	Poland	9,545
Electric accumulators, incl. separators therefor, whether or not square or rectangular; parts thereof (excl. spent and those of unhardened rubber or textiles) (8507)	131,489	4	Germany	8,028
Electric accumulators, incl. separators therefor, whether or not square or rectangular; parts thereof (excl. spent and those of unhardened rubber or textiles) (8507)	131,489	5	Hungary	7,427
Vacuum cleaners, incl. dry cleaners and wet vacuum cleaners (8508)	16,279	1	China	6,741
Vacuum cleaners, incl. dry cleaners and wet vacuum cleaners (8508)	16,279	2	Germany	2,003
Vacuum cleaners, incl. dry cleaners and wet vacuum cleaners (8508)	16,279	3	Malaysia	1,323
Vacuum cleaners, incl. dry cleaners and wet vacuum cleaners (8508)	16,279	4	Vietnam	1,231
Vacuum cleaners, incl. dry cleaners and wet vacuum cleaners (8508)	16,279	5	Netherlands	914
Electromechanical domestic appliances, with self−contained electric motor; parts thereof (excl. vacuum cleaners, dry and wet vacuum cleaners) (8509)	19,328	1	China	11,274
Electromechanical domestic appliances, with self−contained electric motor; parts thereof (excl. vacuum cleaners, dry and wet vacuum cleaners) (8509)	19,328	2	Germany	1,197
Electromechanical domestic appliances, with self−contained electric motor; parts thereof (excl. vacuum cleaners, dry and wet vacuum cleaners) (8509)	19,328	3	United States	785
Electromechanical domestic appliances, with self−contained electric motor; parts thereof (excl. vacuum cleaners, dry and wet vacuum cleaners) (8509)	19,328	4	Netherlands	745
Electromechanical domestic appliances, with self−contained electric motor; parts thereof (excl. vacuum cleaners, dry and wet vacuum cleaners) (8509)	19,328	5	Hungary	521
Electric shavers, hair clippers and hair−removing appliances, with self−contained electric motor; parts thereof (8510)	5,792	1	China	2,035
Electric shavers, hair clippers and hair−removing appliances, with self−contained electric motor; parts thereof (8510)	5,792	2	Germany	742
Electric shavers, hair clippers and hair−removing appliances, with self−contained electric motor; parts thereof (8510)	5,792	3	Netherlands	696
Electric shavers, hair clippers and hair−removing appliances, with self−contained electric motor; parts thereof (8510)	5,792	4	Poland	370
Electric shavers, hair clippers and hair−removing appliances, with self−contained electric motor; parts thereof (8510)	5,792	5	Hungary	336
Electrical ignition or starting equipment of a kind used for spark−ignition or compression−ignition internal combustion engines, e.g. ignition magnetos, magneto−dynamos, ignition coils, sparking plugs, glow plugs and starter motors; generators, e.g. dynamos and alternators, and cut−outs of a kind used in conjunction with such engines; parts thereof (8511)	20,363	1	Japan	3,102
Electrical ignition or starting equipment of a kind used for spark−ignition or compression−ignition internal combustion engines, e.g. ignition magnetos, magneto−dynamos, ignition coils, sparking plugs, glow plugs and starter motors; generators, e.g. dynamos and alternators, and cut−outs of a kind used in conjunction with such engines; parts thereof (8511)	20,363	2	China	3,009
Electrical ignition or starting equipment of a kind used for spark−ignition or compression−ignition internal combustion engines, e.g. ignition magnetos, magneto−dynamos, ignition coils, sparking plugs, glow plugs and starter motors; generators, e.g. dynamos and alternators, and cut−outs of a kind used in conjunction with such engines; parts thereof (8511)	20,363	3	United States	2,139
Electrical ignition or starting equipment of a kind used for spark−ignition or compression−ignition internal combustion engines, e.g. ignition magnetos, magneto−dynamos, ignition coils, sparking plugs, glow plugs and starter motors; generators, e.g. dynamos and alternators, and cut−outs of a kind used in conjunction with such engines; parts thereof (8511)	20,363	4	Germany	2,084
Electrical ignition or starting equipment of a kind used for spark−ignition or compression−ignition internal combustion engines, e.g. ignition magnetos, magneto−dynamos, ignition coils, sparking plugs, glow plugs and starter motors; generators, e.g. dynamos and alternators, and cut−outs of a kind used in conjunction with such engines; parts thereof (8511)	20,363	5	Mexico	1,763
Electrical lighting or signalling equipment (excl. lamps of heading 8539), windscreen wipers, defrosters and demisters, of a kind used for cycles or motor vehicles; parts thereof (8512)	36,762	1	China	6,611
Electrical lighting or signalling equipment (excl. lamps of heading 8539), windscreen wipers, defrosters and demisters, of a kind used for cycles or motor vehicles; parts thereof (8512)	36,762	2	Germany	4,349
Electrical lighting or signalling equipment (excl. lamps of heading 8539), windscreen wipers, defrosters and demisters, of a kind used for cycles or motor vehicles; parts thereof (8512)	36,762	3	Mexico	3,899
Electrical lighting or signalling equipment (excl. lamps of heading 8539), windscreen wipers, defrosters and demisters, of a kind used for cycles or motor vehicles; parts thereof (8512)	36,762	4	United States	2,449
Electrical lighting or signalling equipment (excl. lamps of heading 8539), windscreen wipers, defrosters and demisters, of a kind used for cycles or motor vehicles; parts thereof (8512)	36,762	5	Czech Republic	1,875
Portable electric lamps designed to function by their own source of energy, e.g. dry batteries, accumulators and magnetos; parts thereof (excl. lighting equipment of heading 8512) (8513)	4,097	1	China	3,146
Portable electric lamps designed to function by their own source of energy, e.g. dry batteries, accumulators and magnetos; parts thereof (excl. lighting equipment of heading 8512) (8513)	4,097	2	United States	151
Portable electric lamps designed to function by their own source of energy, e.g. dry batteries, accumulators and magnetos; parts thereof (excl. lighting equipment of heading 8512) (8513)	4,097	3	Germany	138
Portable electric lamps designed to function by their own source of energy, e.g. dry batteries, accumulators and magnetos; parts thereof (excl. lighting equipment of heading 8512) (8513)	4,097	4	Hong Kong	88
Portable electric lamps designed to function by their own source of energy, e.g. dry batteries, accumulators and magnetos; parts thereof (excl. lighting equipment of heading 8512) (8513)	4,097	5	France	72
Industrial or laboratory electric furnaces and ovens, incl. those functioning by induction or dielectric loss; other industrial or laboratory equipment for the heat treatment of materials by induction or dielectric loss; parts thereof (8514)	6,135	1	China	1,279
Industrial or laboratory electric furnaces and ovens, incl. those functioning by induction or dielectric loss; other industrial or laboratory equipment for the heat treatment of materials by induction or dielectric loss; parts thereof (8514)	6,135	2	Germany	882
Industrial or laboratory electric furnaces and ovens, incl. those functioning by induction or dielectric loss; other industrial or laboratory equipment for the heat treatment of materials by induction or dielectric loss; parts thereof (8514)	6,135	3	Italy	743
Industrial or laboratory electric furnaces and ovens, incl. those functioning by induction or dielectric loss; other industrial or laboratory equipment for the heat treatment of materials by induction or dielectric loss; parts thereof (8514)	6,135	4	United States	697
Industrial or laboratory electric furnaces and ovens, incl. those functioning by induction or dielectric loss; other industrial or laboratory equipment for the heat treatment of materials by induction or dielectric loss; parts thereof (8514)	6,135	5	Japan	346
Electric, incl. electrically heated gas, laser or other light or photon beam, ultrasonic, electron beam, magnetic pulse or plasma arc soldering, brazing or welding machines and apparatus, whether or not capable of cutting; electric machines and apparatus for hot spraying of metals, metal carbides or cermets; parts thereof (excl. guns for spraying hot materials of heading 8424) (8515)	12,329	1	China	2,510
Electric, incl. electrically heated gas, laser or other light or photon beam, ultrasonic, electron beam, magnetic pulse or plasma arc soldering, brazing or welding machines and apparatus, whether or not capable of cutting; electric machines and apparatus for hot spraying of metals, metal carbides or cermets; parts thereof (excl. guns for spraying hot materials of heading 8424) (8515)	12,329	2	Germany	2,406
Electric, incl. electrically heated gas, laser or other light or photon beam, ultrasonic, electron beam, magnetic pulse or plasma arc soldering, brazing or welding machines and apparatus, whether or not capable of cutting; electric machines and apparatus for hot spraying of metals, metal carbides or cermets; parts thereof (excl. guns for spraying hot materials of heading 8424) (8515)	12,329	3	United States	1,070
Electric, incl. electrically heated gas, laser or other light or photon beam, ultrasonic, electron beam, magnetic pulse or plasma arc soldering, brazing or welding machines and apparatus, whether or not capable of cutting; electric machines and apparatus for hot spraying of metals, metal carbides or cermets; parts thereof (excl. guns for spraying hot materials of heading 8424) (8515)	12,329	4	Japan	888
Electric, incl. electrically heated gas, laser or other light or photon beam, ultrasonic, electron beam, magnetic pulse or plasma arc soldering, brazing or welding machines and apparatus, whether or not capable of cutting; electric machines and apparatus for hot spraying of metals, metal carbides or cermets; parts thereof (excl. guns for spraying hot materials of heading 8424) (8515)	12,329	5	Italy	608
Electric instantaneous or storage water heaters and immersion heaters; electric space−heating apparatus and soil−heating apparatus; electro−thermic hairdressing apparatus, e.g. hairdryers, hair curlers and curling tong heaters, and hand dryers; electric smoothing irons; other electro−thermic appliances of a kind used for domestic purposes; electric heating resistors (other than those of heading 8545); parts thereof (8516)	69,193	1	China	30,627
Electric instantaneous or storage water heaters and immersion heaters; electric space−heating apparatus and soil−heating apparatus; electro−thermic hairdressing apparatus, e.g. hairdryers, hair curlers and curling tong heaters, and hand dryers; electric smoothing irons; other electro−thermic appliances of a kind used for domestic purposes; electric heating resistors (other than those of heading 8545); parts thereof (8516)	69,193	2	Germany	5,579
Electric instantaneous or storage water heaters and immersion heaters; electric space−heating apparatus and soil−heating apparatus; electro−thermic hairdressing apparatus, e.g. hairdryers, hair curlers and curling tong heaters, and hand dryers; electric smoothing irons; other electro−thermic appliances of a kind used for domestic purposes; electric heating resistors (other than those of heading 8545); parts thereof (8516)	69,193	3	Italy	2,951
Electric instantaneous or storage water heaters and immersion heaters; electric space−heating apparatus and soil−heating apparatus; electro−thermic hairdressing apparatus, e.g. hairdryers, hair curlers and curling tong heaters, and hand dryers; electric smoothing irons; other electro−thermic appliances of a kind used for domestic purposes; electric heating resistors (other than those of heading 8545); parts thereof (8516)	69,193	4	Mexico	1,978
Electric instantaneous or storage water heaters and immersion heaters; electric space−heating apparatus and soil−heating apparatus; electro−thermic hairdressing apparatus, e.g. hairdryers, hair curlers and curling tong heaters, and hand dryers; electric smoothing irons; other electro−thermic appliances of a kind used for domestic purposes; electric heating resistors (other than those of heading 8545); parts thereof (8516)	69,193	5	Poland	1,865
Telephone sets, incl. smartphones and other telephones for cellular networks or for other wireless networks; other apparatus for the transmission or reception of voice, images or other data, incl. apparatus for communication in a wired or wireless network, parts thereof (8517)	608,516	1	China	245,256
Telephone sets, incl. smartphones and other telephones for cellular networks or for other wireless networks; other apparatus for the transmission or reception of voice, images or other data, incl. apparatus for communication in a wired or wireless network, parts thereof (8517)	608,516	2	Vietnam	76,567
Telephone sets, incl. smartphones and other telephones for cellular networks or for other wireless networks; other apparatus for the transmission or reception of voice, images or other data, incl. apparatus for communication in a wired or wireless network, parts thereof (8517)	608,516	3	Hong Kong	57,982
Telephone sets, incl. smartphones and other telephones for cellular networks or for other wireless networks; other apparatus for the transmission or reception of voice, images or other data, incl. apparatus for communication in a wired or wireless network, parts thereof (8517)	608,516	4	United States	34,000
Telephone sets, incl. smartphones and other telephones for cellular networks or for other wireless networks; other apparatus for the transmission or reception of voice, images or other data, incl. apparatus for communication in a wired or wireless network, parts thereof (8517)	608,516	5	Netherlands	21,222
Microphones and stands therefor (excl. cordless microphones with built−in transmitter); loudspeakers; headphones and earphones, whether or not combined with a microphone, and sets consisting of a microphone and one or more loudspeakers (excl. telephone sets, hearing aids and helmets with built−in headphones, whether or not incorporating a microphone); audio−frequency electric amplifiers; electric sound amplifier sets; parts thereof (8518)	54,399	1	China	21,747
Microphones and stands therefor (excl. cordless microphones with built−in transmitter); loudspeakers; headphones and earphones, whether or not combined with a microphone, and sets consisting of a microphone and one or more loudspeakers (excl. telephone sets, hearing aids and helmets with built−in headphones, whether or not incorporating a microphone); audio−frequency electric amplifiers; electric sound amplifier sets; parts thereof (8518)	54,399	2	Vietnam	8,341
Microphones and stands therefor (excl. cordless microphones with built−in transmitter); loudspeakers; headphones and earphones, whether or not combined with a microphone, and sets consisting of a microphone and one or more loudspeakers (excl. telephone sets, hearing aids and helmets with built−in headphones, whether or not incorporating a microphone); audio−frequency electric amplifiers; electric sound amplifier sets; parts thereof (8518)	54,399	3	Germany	3,082
Microphones and stands therefor (excl. cordless microphones with built−in transmitter); loudspeakers; headphones and earphones, whether or not combined with a microphone, and sets consisting of a microphone and one or more loudspeakers (excl. telephone sets, hearing aids and helmets with built−in headphones, whether or not incorporating a microphone); audio−frequency electric amplifiers; electric sound amplifier sets; parts thereof (8518)	54,399	4	United States	2,976
Microphones and stands therefor (excl. cordless microphones with built−in transmitter); loudspeakers; headphones and earphones, whether or not combined with a microphone, and sets consisting of a microphone and one or more loudspeakers (excl. telephone sets, hearing aids and helmets with built−in headphones, whether or not incorporating a microphone); audio−frequency electric amplifiers; electric sound amplifier sets; parts thereof (8518)	54,399	5	Hong Kong	2,964
Sound recording or sound reproducing apparatus (8519)	3,764	1	China	1,616
Sound recording or sound reproducing apparatus (8519)	3,764	2	Netherlands	448
Sound recording or sound reproducing apparatus (8519)	3,764	3	Vietnam	312
Sound recording or sound reproducing apparatus (8519)	3,764	4	Germany	183
Sound recording or sound reproducing apparatus (8519)	3,764	5	United States	137
Video recording or reproducing apparatus, whether or not incorporating a video tuner (excl. video camera recorders) (8521)	4,283	1	China	2,386
Video recording or reproducing apparatus, whether or not incorporating a video tuner (excl. video camera recorders) (8521)	4,283	2	Netherlands	517
Video recording or reproducing apparatus, whether or not incorporating a video tuner (excl. video camera recorders) (8521)	4,283	3	United States	175
Video recording or reproducing apparatus, whether or not incorporating a video tuner (excl. video camera recorders) (8521)	4,283	4	Malaysia	107
Video recording or reproducing apparatus, whether or not incorporating a video tuner (excl. video camera recorders) (8521)	4,283	5	South Korea	103
Parts and accessories suitable for use solely or principally with sound reproducing and recording apparatus and with video equipment for recording and reproducing pictures and sound (8522)	1,982	1	China	618
Parts and accessories suitable for use solely or principally with sound reproducing and recording apparatus and with video equipment for recording and reproducing pictures and sound (8522)	1,982	2	Hong Kong	284
Parts and accessories suitable for use solely or principally with sound reproducing and recording apparatus and with video equipment for recording and reproducing pictures and sound (8522)	1,982	3	United States	262
Parts and accessories suitable for use solely or principally with sound reproducing and recording apparatus and with video equipment for recording and reproducing pictures and sound (8522)	1,982	4	Indonesia	166
Parts and accessories suitable for use solely or principally with sound reproducing and recording apparatus and with video equipment for recording and reproducing pictures and sound (8522)	1,982	5	Thailand	112
Discs, tapes, solid−state non−volatile storage devices, "smart cards" and other media for the recording of sound or of other phenomena, whether or not recorded, incl. matrices and masters for the production of discs (8523)	72,935	1	South Korea	14,295
Discs, tapes, solid−state non−volatile storage devices, "smart cards" and other media for the recording of sound or of other phenomena, whether or not recorded, incl. matrices and masters for the production of discs (8523)	72,935	2	Taiwan	8,819
Discs, tapes, solid−state non−volatile storage devices, "smart cards" and other media for the recording of sound or of other phenomena, whether or not recorded, incl. matrices and masters for the production of discs (8523)	72,935	3	United States	8,252
Discs, tapes, solid−state non−volatile storage devices, "smart cards" and other media for the recording of sound or of other phenomena, whether or not recorded, incl. matrices and masters for the production of discs (8523)	72,935	4	Malaysia	7,566
Discs, tapes, solid−state non−volatile storage devices, "smart cards" and other media for the recording of sound or of other phenomena, whether or not recorded, incl. matrices and masters for the production of discs (8523)	72,935	5	Hong Kong	5,565
Transmission apparatus for radio−broadcasting or television, whether or not incorporating reception apparatus or sound recording or reproducing apparatus; television cameras, digital cameras and video camera recorders (8525)	46,450	1	China	12,264
Transmission apparatus for radio−broadcasting or television, whether or not incorporating reception apparatus or sound recording or reproducing apparatus; television cameras, digital cameras and video camera recorders (8525)	46,450	2	Vietnam	4,058
Transmission apparatus for radio−broadcasting or television, whether or not incorporating reception apparatus or sound recording or reproducing apparatus; television cameras, digital cameras and video camera recorders (8525)	46,450	3	Germany	3,235
Transmission apparatus for radio−broadcasting or television, whether or not incorporating reception apparatus or sound recording or reproducing apparatus; television cameras, digital cameras and video camera recorders (8525)	46,450	4	United States	3,111
Transmission apparatus for radio−broadcasting or television, whether or not incorporating reception apparatus or sound recording or reproducing apparatus; television cameras, digital cameras and video camera recorders (8525)	46,450	5	Japan	2,735
Radar apparatus, radio navigational aid apparatus and radio remote control apparatus (8526)	20,476	1	China	2,977
Radar apparatus, radio navigational aid apparatus and radio remote control apparatus (8526)	20,476	2	United States	2,410
Radar apparatus, radio navigational aid apparatus and radio remote control apparatus (8526)	20,476	3	Germany	2,153
Radar apparatus, radio navigational aid apparatus and radio remote control apparatus (8526)	20,476	4	United Kingdom	965
Radar apparatus, radio navigational aid apparatus and radio remote control apparatus (8526)	20,476	5	Hungary	888
Reception apparatus for radio−broadcasting, whether or not combined, in the same housing, with sound recording or reproducing apparatus or a clock (8527)	11,177	1	China	3,884
Reception apparatus for radio−broadcasting, whether or not combined, in the same housing, with sound recording or reproducing apparatus or a clock (8527)	11,177	2	Mexico	1,807
Reception apparatus for radio−broadcasting, whether or not combined, in the same housing, with sound recording or reproducing apparatus or a clock (8527)	11,177	3	United States	772
Reception apparatus for radio−broadcasting, whether or not combined, in the same housing, with sound recording or reproducing apparatus or a clock (8527)	11,177	4	Portugal	729
Reception apparatus for radio−broadcasting, whether or not combined, in the same housing, with sound recording or reproducing apparatus or a clock (8527)	11,177	5	Thailand	537
Monitors and projectors, not incorporating television reception apparatus; reception apparatus for television, whether or not incorporating radio−broadcast receivers or sound or video recording or reproducing apparatus (8528)	99,563	1	China	36,212
Monitors and projectors, not incorporating television reception apparatus; reception apparatus for television, whether or not incorporating radio−broadcast receivers or sound or video recording or reproducing apparatus (8528)	99,563	2	Mexico	13,816
Monitors and projectors, not incorporating television reception apparatus; reception apparatus for television, whether or not incorporating radio−broadcast receivers or sound or video recording or reproducing apparatus (8528)	99,563	3	Poland	7,328
Monitors and projectors, not incorporating television reception apparatus; reception apparatus for television, whether or not incorporating radio−broadcast receivers or sound or video recording or reproducing apparatus (8528)	99,563	4	Vietnam	4,988
Monitors and projectors, not incorporating television reception apparatus; reception apparatus for television, whether or not incorporating radio−broadcast receivers or sound or video recording or reproducing apparatus (8528)	99,563	5	Slovakia	4,793
Parts suitable for use solely or principally with flat panel display modules, transmission and reception apparatus for radio−telephony, radio−telegraphy, radio−broadcasting, television, television cameras, still image video cameras and other video camera recorders, radar apparatus, radio navigational aid apparatus or radio remote control apparatus, n.e.s. (8529)	17,584	1	Taiwan	4,957
Parts suitable for use solely or principally with flat panel display modules, transmission and reception apparatus for radio−telephony, radio−telegraphy, radio−broadcasting, television, television cameras, still image video cameras and other video camera recorders, radar apparatus, radio navigational aid apparatus or radio remote control apparatus, n.e.s. (8529)	17,584	2	Vietnam	2,029
Parts suitable for use solely or principally with flat panel display modules, transmission and reception apparatus for radio−telephony, radio−telegraphy, radio−broadcasting, television, television cameras, still image video cameras and other video camera recorders, radar apparatus, radio navigational aid apparatus or radio remote control apparatus, n.e.s. (8529)	17,584	3	China	1,673
Parts suitable for use solely or principally with flat panel display modules, transmission and reception apparatus for radio−telephony, radio−telegraphy, radio−broadcasting, television, television cameras, still image video cameras and other video camera recorders, radar apparatus, radio navigational aid apparatus or radio remote control apparatus, n.e.s. (8529)	17,584	4	United States	974
Parts suitable for use solely or principally with flat panel display modules, transmission and reception apparatus for radio−telephony, radio−telegraphy, radio−broadcasting, television, television cameras, still image video cameras and other video camera recorders, radar apparatus, radio navigational aid apparatus or radio remote control apparatus, n.e.s. (8529)	17,584	5	Netherlands	727
Electrical signalling, safety or traffic control equipment for railways, tramways, roads, inland waterways, parking facilities, port installations or airfields (excl. mechanical or electromechanical equipment of heading 8608); parts thereof (8530)	2,664	1	China	443
Electrical signalling, safety or traffic control equipment for railways, tramways, roads, inland waterways, parking facilities, port installations or airfields (excl. mechanical or electromechanical equipment of heading 8608); parts thereof (8530)	2,664	2	Germany	332
Electrical signalling, safety or traffic control equipment for railways, tramways, roads, inland waterways, parking facilities, port installations or airfields (excl. mechanical or electromechanical equipment of heading 8608); parts thereof (8530)	2,664	3	United States	215
Electrical signalling, safety or traffic control equipment for railways, tramways, roads, inland waterways, parking facilities, port installations or airfields (excl. mechanical or electromechanical equipment of heading 8608); parts thereof (8530)	2,664	4	Austria	186
Electrical signalling, safety or traffic control equipment for railways, tramways, roads, inland waterways, parking facilities, port installations or airfields (excl. mechanical or electromechanical equipment of heading 8608); parts thereof (8530)	2,664	5	Italy	170
Electric sound or visual signalling apparatus, e.g. bells, sirens, indicator panels, burglar or fire alarms (excl. those for cycles, motor vehicles and traffic signalling); parts thereof (8531)	21,006	1	China	5,886
Electric sound or visual signalling apparatus, e.g. bells, sirens, indicator panels, burglar or fire alarms (excl. those for cycles, motor vehicles and traffic signalling); parts thereof (8531)	21,006	2	United States	1,848
Electric sound or visual signalling apparatus, e.g. bells, sirens, indicator panels, burglar or fire alarms (excl. those for cycles, motor vehicles and traffic signalling); parts thereof (8531)	21,006	3	Vietnam	1,287
Electric sound or visual signalling apparatus, e.g. bells, sirens, indicator panels, burglar or fire alarms (excl. those for cycles, motor vehicles and traffic signalling); parts thereof (8531)	21,006	4	Hong Kong	1,090
Electric sound or visual signalling apparatus, e.g. bells, sirens, indicator panels, burglar or fire alarms (excl. those for cycles, motor vehicles and traffic signalling); parts thereof (8531)	21,006	5	Germany	1,088
Electrical capacitors, fixed, variable or adjustable "pre−set"; parts thereof (8532)	37,280	1	Japan	7,197
Electrical capacitors, fixed, variable or adjustable "pre−set"; parts thereof (8532)	37,280	2	China	6,314
Electrical capacitors, fixed, variable or adjustable "pre−set"; parts thereof (8532)	37,280	3	Hong Kong	5,558
Electrical capacitors, fixed, variable or adjustable "pre−set"; parts thereof (8532)	37,280	4	United States	2,308
Electrical capacitors, fixed, variable or adjustable "pre−set"; parts thereof (8532)	37,280	5	Taiwan	2,206
Electrical resistors, incl. rheostats and potentiometers (excl. heating resistors); parts thereof (8533)	16,104	1	China	5,304
Electrical resistors, incl. rheostats and potentiometers (excl. heating resistors); parts thereof (8533)	16,104	2	Hong Kong	1,720
Electrical resistors, incl. rheostats and potentiometers (excl. heating resistors); parts thereof (8533)	16,104	3	Germany	1,360
Electrical resistors, incl. rheostats and potentiometers (excl. heating resistors); parts thereof (8533)	16,104	4	United States	1,186
Electrical resistors, incl. rheostats and potentiometers (excl. heating resistors); parts thereof (8533)	16,104	5	Japan	1,036
Printed circuits (8534)	59,523	1	China	19,833
Printed circuits (8534)	59,523	2	Hong Kong	10,408
Printed circuits (8534)	59,523	3	Taiwan	7,043
Printed circuits (8534)	59,523	4	South Korea	5,952
Printed circuits (8534)	59,523	5	Japan	3,256
Electrical apparatus for switching or protecting electrical circuits, or for making connections to or in electrical circuits, e.g., switches, fuses, lightning arresters, voltage limiters, surge suppressors, plugs and other connectors, junction boxes, for a voltage > 1.000 V (excl. control desks, cabinets, panels etc. of heading 8537 (8535)	8,916	1	Germany	1,240
Electrical apparatus for switching or protecting electrical circuits, or for making connections to or in electrical circuits, e.g., switches, fuses, lightning arresters, voltage limiters, surge suppressors, plugs and other connectors, junction boxes, for a voltage > 1.000 V (excl. control desks, cabinets, panels etc. of heading 8537 (8535)	8,916	2	China	1,078
Electrical apparatus for switching or protecting electrical circuits, or for making connections to or in electrical circuits, e.g., switches, fuses, lightning arresters, voltage limiters, surge suppressors, plugs and other connectors, junction boxes, for a voltage > 1.000 V (excl. control desks, cabinets, panels etc. of heading 8537 (8535)	8,916	3	United States	871
Electrical apparatus for switching or protecting electrical circuits, or for making connections to or in electrical circuits, e.g., switches, fuses, lightning arresters, voltage limiters, surge suppressors, plugs and other connectors, junction boxes, for a voltage > 1.000 V (excl. control desks, cabinets, panels etc. of heading 8537 (8535)	8,916	4	Switzerland	778
Electrical apparatus for switching or protecting electrical circuits, or for making connections to or in electrical circuits, e.g., switches, fuses, lightning arresters, voltage limiters, surge suppressors, plugs and other connectors, junction boxes, for a voltage > 1.000 V (excl. control desks, cabinets, panels etc. of heading 8537 (8535)	8,916	5	Mexico	559
Electrical apparatus for switching or protecting electrical circuits, or for making connections to or in electrical circuits, e.g., switches, relays, fuses, surge suppressors, plugs, sockets, lamp holders and junction boxes, for a voltage <= 1.000 V (excl. control desks, cabinets, panels etc. of heading 8537 (8536)	124,906	1	China	23,120
Electrical apparatus for switching or protecting electrical circuits, or for making connections to or in electrical circuits, e.g., switches, relays, fuses, surge suppressors, plugs, sockets, lamp holders and junction boxes, for a voltage <= 1.000 V (excl. control desks, cabinets, panels etc. of heading 8537 (8536)	124,906	2	Germany	16,825
Electrical apparatus for switching or protecting electrical circuits, or for making connections to or in electrical circuits, e.g., switches, relays, fuses, surge suppressors, plugs, sockets, lamp holders and junction boxes, for a voltage <= 1.000 V (excl. control desks, cabinets, panels etc. of heading 8537 (8536)	124,906	3	United States	12,174
Electrical apparatus for switching or protecting electrical circuits, or for making connections to or in electrical circuits, e.g., switches, relays, fuses, surge suppressors, plugs, sockets, lamp holders and junction boxes, for a voltage <= 1.000 V (excl. control desks, cabinets, panels etc. of heading 8537 (8536)	124,906	4	Hong Kong	8,916
Electrical apparatus for switching or protecting electrical circuits, or for making connections to or in electrical circuits, e.g., switches, relays, fuses, surge suppressors, plugs, sockets, lamp holders and junction boxes, for a voltage <= 1.000 V (excl. control desks, cabinets, panels etc. of heading 8537 (8536)	124,906	5	Japan	7,339
Boards, panels, consoles, desks, cabinets and other bases, equipped with two or more apparatus of heading 8535 or 8536, for electric control or the distribution of electricity, incl. those incorporating instruments or apparatus of chapter 90, and numerical control apparatus (excl. switching apparatus for line telephony or line telegraphy) (8537)	81,840	1	Germany	13,354
Boards, panels, consoles, desks, cabinets and other bases, equipped with two or more apparatus of heading 8535 or 8536, for electric control or the distribution of electricity, incl. those incorporating instruments or apparatus of chapter 90, and numerical control apparatus (excl. switching apparatus for line telephony or line telegraphy) (8537)	81,840	2	China	12,815
Boards, panels, consoles, desks, cabinets and other bases, equipped with two or more apparatus of heading 8535 or 8536, for electric control or the distribution of electricity, incl. those incorporating instruments or apparatus of chapter 90, and numerical control apparatus (excl. switching apparatus for line telephony or line telegraphy) (8537)	81,840	3	Mexico	6,658
Boards, panels, consoles, desks, cabinets and other bases, equipped with two or more apparatus of heading 8535 or 8536, for electric control or the distribution of electricity, incl. those incorporating instruments or apparatus of chapter 90, and numerical control apparatus (excl. switching apparatus for line telephony or line telegraphy) (8537)	81,840	4	United States	6,378
Boards, panels, consoles, desks, cabinets and other bases, equipped with two or more apparatus of heading 8535 or 8536, for electric control or the distribution of electricity, incl. those incorporating instruments or apparatus of chapter 90, and numerical control apparatus (excl. switching apparatus for line telephony or line telegraphy) (8537)	81,840	5	Japan	3,275
Parts suitable for use solely or principally with the apparatus of heading 8535, 8536 or 8537, n.e.s (8538)	45,464	1	China	6,363
Parts suitable for use solely or principally with the apparatus of heading 8535, 8536 or 8537, n.e.s (8538)	45,464	2	Germany	6,206
Parts suitable for use solely or principally with the apparatus of heading 8535, 8536 or 8537, n.e.s (8538)	45,464	3	United States	5,394
Parts suitable for use solely or principally with the apparatus of heading 8535, 8536 or 8537, n.e.s (8538)	45,464	4	Japan	2,836
Parts suitable for use solely or principally with the apparatus of heading 8535, 8536 or 8537, n.e.s (8538)	45,464	5	Mexico	2,081
Electric filament or discharge lamps, incl. sealed beam lamp units and ultraviolet or infra−red lamps; arc lamps; light−emitting diode "LED" light sources; parts thereof (8539)	14,486	1	China	8,558
Electric filament or discharge lamps, incl. sealed beam lamp units and ultraviolet or infra−red lamps; arc lamps; light−emitting diode "LED" light sources; parts thereof (8539)	14,486	2	Germany	1,097
Electric filament or discharge lamps, incl. sealed beam lamp units and ultraviolet or infra−red lamps; arc lamps; light−emitting diode "LED" light sources; parts thereof (8539)	14,486	3	France	536
Electric filament or discharge lamps, incl. sealed beam lamp units and ultraviolet or infra−red lamps; arc lamps; light−emitting diode "LED" light sources; parts thereof (8539)	14,486	4	United States	513
Electric filament or discharge lamps, incl. sealed beam lamp units and ultraviolet or infra−red lamps; arc lamps; light−emitting diode "LED" light sources; parts thereof (8539)	14,486	5	Japan	426
Thermionic, cold cathode or photo−cathode valves and tubes, e.g. vacuum or vapour or gas filled valves and tubes, mercury arc rectifying valves and tubes, cathode ray tubes and television camera tubes; parts thereof (8540)	1,734	1	United States	355
Thermionic, cold cathode or photo−cathode valves and tubes, e.g. vacuum or vapour or gas filled valves and tubes, mercury arc rectifying valves and tubes, cathode ray tubes and television camera tubes; parts thereof (8540)	1,734	2	Japan	235
Thermionic, cold cathode or photo−cathode valves and tubes, e.g. vacuum or vapour or gas filled valves and tubes, mercury arc rectifying valves and tubes, cathode ray tubes and television camera tubes; parts thereof (8540)	1,734	3	Netherlands	203
Thermionic, cold cathode or photo−cathode valves and tubes, e.g. vacuum or vapour or gas filled valves and tubes, mercury arc rectifying valves and tubes, cathode ray tubes and television camera tubes; parts thereof (8540)	1,734	4	France	200
Thermionic, cold cathode or photo−cathode valves and tubes, e.g. vacuum or vapour or gas filled valves and tubes, mercury arc rectifying valves and tubes, cathode ray tubes and television camera tubes; parts thereof (8540)	1,734	5	Germany	153
Semiconductor devices (8541)	168,043	1	China	65,483
Semiconductor devices (8541)	168,043	2	Hong Kong	17,772
Semiconductor devices (8541)	168,043	3	Singapore	12,703
Semiconductor devices (8541)	168,043	4	Malaysia	9,223
Semiconductor devices (8541)	168,043	5	Germany	9,087
Electronic integrated circuits; parts thereof (8542)	1,096,170	1	Hong Kong	214,236
Electronic integrated circuits; parts thereof (8542)	1,096,170	2	Taiwan	183,835
Electronic integrated circuits; parts thereof (8542)	1,096,170	3	China	154,524
Electronic integrated circuits; parts thereof (8542)	1,096,170	4	Singapore	122,019
Electronic integrated circuits; parts thereof (8542)	1,096,170	5	South Korea	112,850
Electrical machines and apparatus, having individual functions, n.e.s. in chapter 85 and parts thereof (8543)	68,419	1	China	22,329
Electrical machines and apparatus, having individual functions, n.e.s. in chapter 85 and parts thereof (8543)	68,419	2	Singapore	5,440
Electrical machines and apparatus, having individual functions, n.e.s. in chapter 85 and parts thereof (8543)	68,419	3	United States	4,814
Electrical machines and apparatus, having individual functions, n.e.s. in chapter 85 and parts thereof (8543)	68,419	4	Germany	4,808
Electrical machines and apparatus, having individual functions, n.e.s. in chapter 85 and parts thereof (8543)	68,419	5	Japan	3,743
Insulated "incl. enamelled or anodised" wire, cable "incl. coaxial cable" and other insulated electric conductors, whether or not fitted with connectors; optical fibre cables, made up of individually sheathed fibres, whether or not assembled with electric conductors or fitted with connectors (8544)	161,819	1	China	31,147
Insulated "incl. enamelled or anodised" wire, cable "incl. coaxial cable" and other insulated electric conductors, whether or not fitted with connectors; optical fibre cables, made up of individually sheathed fibres, whether or not assembled with electric conductors or fitted with connectors (8544)	161,819	2	Mexico	16,456
Insulated "incl. enamelled or anodised" wire, cable "incl. coaxial cable" and other insulated electric conductors, whether or not fitted with connectors; optical fibre cables, made up of individually sheathed fibres, whether or not assembled with electric conductors or fitted with connectors (8544)	161,819	3	United States	12,003
Insulated "incl. enamelled or anodised" wire, cable "incl. coaxial cable" and other insulated electric conductors, whether or not fitted with connectors; optical fibre cables, made up of individually sheathed fibres, whether or not assembled with electric conductors or fitted with connectors (8544)	161,819	4	Germany	10,077
Insulated "incl. enamelled or anodised" wire, cable "incl. coaxial cable" and other insulated electric conductors, whether or not fitted with connectors; optical fibre cables, made up of individually sheathed fibres, whether or not assembled with electric conductors or fitted with connectors (8544)	161,819	5	Vietnam	7,488
Carbon electrodes, carbon brushes, lamp carbons, battery carbons and other articles of graphite or other carbon, with or without metal, of a kind used for electrical purposes (8545)	7,928	1	China	3,887
Carbon electrodes, carbon brushes, lamp carbons, battery carbons and other articles of graphite or other carbon, with or without metal, of a kind used for electrical purposes (8545)	7,928	2	Spain	545
Carbon electrodes, carbon brushes, lamp carbons, battery carbons and other articles of graphite or other carbon, with or without metal, of a kind used for electrical purposes (8545)	7,928	3	France	486
Carbon electrodes, carbon brushes, lamp carbons, battery carbons and other articles of graphite or other carbon, with or without metal, of a kind used for electrical purposes (8545)	7,928	4	Japan	392
Carbon electrodes, carbon brushes, lamp carbons, battery carbons and other articles of graphite or other carbon, with or without metal, of a kind used for electrical purposes (8545)	7,928	5	United States	331
Electrical insulators of any material (excl. insulating fittings) (8546)	2,398	1	China	639
Electrical insulators of any material (excl. insulating fittings) (8546)	2,398	2	United States	255
Electrical insulators of any material (excl. insulating fittings) (8546)	2,398	3	Germany	213
Electrical insulators of any material (excl. insulating fittings) (8546)	2,398	4	Italy	185
Electrical insulators of any material (excl. insulating fittings) (8546)	2,398	5	India	155
Insulating fittings for electrical machines, appliances or equipment, being fittings wholly of insulating material apart from any minor components of metal, e.g., threaded sockets, incorporated during moulding solely for purposes of assembly (other than insulators of heading 8546); electrical conduit tubing and joints therefor, of base metal lined with insulating material (8547)	6,796	1	Germany	1,370
Insulating fittings for electrical machines, appliances or equipment, being fittings wholly of insulating material apart from any minor components of metal, e.g., threaded sockets, incorporated during moulding solely for purposes of assembly (other than insulators of heading 8546); electrical conduit tubing and joints therefor, of base metal lined with insulating material (8547)	6,796	2	China	852
Insulating fittings for electrical machines, appliances or equipment, being fittings wholly of insulating material apart from any minor components of metal, e.g., threaded sockets, incorporated during moulding solely for purposes of assembly (other than insulators of heading 8546); electrical conduit tubing and joints therefor, of base metal lined with insulating material (8547)	6,796	3	Japan	741
Insulating fittings for electrical machines, appliances or equipment, being fittings wholly of insulating material apart from any minor components of metal, e.g., threaded sockets, incorporated during moulding solely for purposes of assembly (other than insulators of heading 8546); electrical conduit tubing and joints therefor, of base metal lined with insulating material (8547)	6,796	4	Czech Republic	590
Insulating fittings for electrical machines, appliances or equipment, being fittings wholly of insulating material apart from any minor components of metal, e.g., threaded sockets, incorporated during moulding solely for purposes of assembly (other than insulators of heading 8546); electrical conduit tubing and joints therefor, of base metal lined with insulating material (8547)	6,796	5	United States	568
Waste and scrap of primary cells, primary batteries and electric accumulators; spent primary cells, spent primary batteries and spent electric accumulators; electrical parts of machinery or apparatus, not specified or included elsewhere (8548)	8,551	1	China	3,509
Waste and scrap of primary cells, primary batteries and electric accumulators; spent primary cells, spent primary batteries and spent electric accumulators; electrical parts of machinery or apparatus, not specified or included elsewhere (8548)	8,551	2	Japan	825
Waste and scrap of primary cells, primary batteries and electric accumulators; spent primary cells, spent primary batteries and spent electric accumulators; electrical parts of machinery or apparatus, not specified or included elsewhere (8548)	8,551	3	United States	811
Waste and scrap of primary cells, primary batteries and electric accumulators; spent primary cells, spent primary batteries and spent electric accumulators; electrical parts of machinery or apparatus, not specified or included elsewhere (8548)	8,551	4	Hong Kong	665
Waste and scrap of primary cells, primary batteries and electric accumulators; spent primary cells, spent primary batteries and spent electric accumulators; electrical parts of machinery or apparatus, not specified or included elsewhere (8548)	8,551	5	Germany	291
