= Heads Creek =

Stream in the American state of Missouri

Heads Creek is a stream in Jefferson County in the U.S. state of Missouri. Heads Creek is a tributary of Big River.

The stream headwaters arise just north of Missouri Route 21 and it flows north passing west of Otto. It turns northeast and flows parallel to Missouri Route MM passing southwest of House Springs. The stream passes under Missouri Route 30 to its confluence with Big River across the river from Rockford Beach and about one mile southwest of Byrnes Mill. The source area is at 38°19′59″N 90°32′03″W and the confluence is at 38°25′20″N 90°35′19″W.

Heads Creek has the name of James Head, a pioneer citizen.

== See also ==
- List of rivers of Missouri
