= Kaolin Creek =

Stream in the American state of Missouri

Kaolin Creek is a stream in northern Iron County in the U.S. state of Missouri. It is a tributary of Ottery Creek.

The stream headwaters arise one-half mile north of Kaolin Township, on the south flank of Johnson Mountain between Banner to the east and Enough to the west at 37°42′39″N 90°52′42″W and the stream flows to the south-southeast to its confluence with Ottery Creek at 37°40′08″N 90°53′39″W.

Kaolin Creek was named for deposits of kaolin in the area.

== See also ==
- List of rivers of Missouri
