= Brock Creek =

Brock Creek may refer to:

- Brock Creek (Missouri), a stream in Missouri
- Brock Creek (Buck Creek tributary), a stream in Pennsylvania
