= Andrews Branch (Terre Bleue Creek tributary) =

Stream in Missouri, U.S.

Andrews Branch Tributary to Terre Bleue Creek
- Location of Andrews Branch mouth Andrews Branch (Terre Bleue Creek tributary) (the United States)

Location
- Country: United States
- State: Missouri
- County: St. Francois

Physical characteristics
- Source: Fourche a Du Clos divide
  - location: about 6 miles southwest of Goose Creek Lake
  - coordinates: 37°55′48.19″N 90°22′13.44″W
  - elevation: 962 ft (293 m)
- Mouth: Terre Bleue Creek
  - location: about 5 miles east of Bonne Terre, Missouri
  - coordinates: 37°55′10.19″N 90°24′35.44″W
  - elevation: 742 ft (226 m)
- Length: 2.69 mi (4.33 km)
- Basin size: 2.79 square miles (7.2 km^{2})
- Discharge
  - location: Terre Bleue Creek
  - average: 4.59 cu ft/s (0.130 m^{3}/s) at mouth with Terre Bleue Creek

Basin features
- Progression: Terre Bleue Creek → Big River → Meramec River → Mississippi River → Gulf of Mexico
- River system: Big River
- Tributaries
  - left: unnamed tributaries
  - right: unnamed tributaries
- Bridges: Roth Road, Highway C

Andrews Branch is a stream in St. Francois County, Missouri. It is a tributary of Terre Bleue Creek.

Andrews Branch has the name of the original owner of the site.

== See also ==
- List of rivers of Missouri
