= Dry Creek (Jefferson County, Missouri) =

Stream in Jefferson County, Missouri, USA

Dry Creek is a stream located in Jefferson County, Missouri, United States. Its source is about 4.4 miles (7.1 km) west of De Soto, at 38.1332°N 90.6373°W, and it empties into the Big River at 38.2715°N 90.6705°W, near Morse Mill.

A 2006 survey by the Missouri Department of Natural Resources found the creek to be shallow and clear, with numerous fish in places.
