= Grubville, Missouri =

Unincorporated community in Missouri, U.S.

Coordinates: 38°17′18″N 90°45′17″W

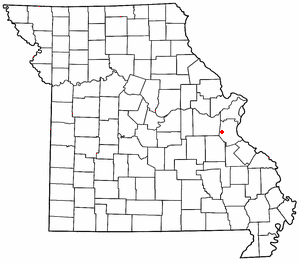

Grubville is an unincorporated community in western Jefferson County, Missouri, United States. It is located approximately one-half mile east of the Jefferson/Franklin County line. Missouri routes WW and Y meet at the community and Route 30 passes approximately one mile to the north. Nearby communities include Dittmer and Morse Mill to the east and Lonedell and Luebbering to the west in Franklin County. Jones Creek flows from the east side of the community to its confluence with Big River approximately five miles to the east.

A post office called Grubville has been in operation since 1853. The community was named after the occupation of a local "grubber" (i.e. post hole digger).
