= Banister Branch =

Stream in Missouri, U.S.

Coordinates: 37°49′15″N 90°32′54″W

Banister Branch is a stream in St. Francois County in the U.S. state of Missouri. It is a tributary of the Flat River.

Banister Branch has the name of the original owner of the site.

== See also ==
- List of rivers of Missouri
