= Jones Creek (Big River tributary) =

Stream in the American state of Missouri

Jones Creek is a stream in western Jefferson County, Missouri, United States. It is a tributary of Big River.

The source is the confluence of the North and West Forks located at: 38°17′39″N 90°40′51″W and the confluence with Big River is at: 38°18′15″N 90°38′16″W. The source area of the North Fork is just south of Missouri Route 30 and the community of Oermann at 38°18′12″N 90°43′42″W. The source area of the West Fork is on the east side of Grubville at 38°17′14″N 90°45′05″W.

The identity of the Jones the creek is named after is unknown.

== See also ==
- List of rivers of Missouri
