= Blay Creek =

Stream in the U.S. state of Missouri

Coordinates: 37°52′12″N 90°38′20″W

Blay Creek is a stream in St. Francois and Washington counties in the U.S. state of Missouri. It is a tributary of the Big River.

The stream source area is east of Summit in eastern Washington County and it flows to the southeast roughly parallel to Missouri Route 8. The stream enters the Big River just after entering St. Francois County. The confluence is about three miles (five kilometers) west of Leadwood.

The stream headwaters are at and its confluence with the Big River is at.

A variant name was "Blays Creek". The stream most likely has the name of a pioneer citizen, possibly that of Joseph Blay.

== See also ==
- List of rivers of Missouri
