= Dry Creek (Big River (Missouri)) =

Stream in the U.S. state of Missouri

Dry Creek is a stream located in Washington and St. Francois Counties in the U.S. state of Missouri. It is a tributary of the Big River. The source of Dry Creek is located in Washington County at 37°45′41″N 90°38′55″W. It flows into St. Francois County near Bismarck, then back into Washington County before emptying into the Big River near Irondale at 37°50′50″N 90°40′51″W.

Dry Creek was named for the fact it often runs dry.

== See also ==
- List of rivers of Missouri
