= Salem Creek (Missouri) =

Stream in the U.S. state of Missouri

Coordinates: 37.9144964°N 90.4570685°W

Salem Creek is a stream in St. Francois and Ste. Genevieve Counties in the U.S. state of Missouri. It is a tributary of Terre Bleue Creek.

Salem Creek takes its name from a nearby Methodist church of the same name.

== See also ==
- List of rivers of Missouri
