= Bertha Gifford =

American serial killer

- Born: Bertha Alice Williams; 30 October 1871; Morse Mill, Missouri, U.S.
- Died: August 20, 1951 (aged 79); Missouri State Hospital, #4, Missouri, U.S.
- Penalty: Committed to mental facility

Details
- Victims: 3–17
- Span of crimes: 1900s–1928
- Country: United States
- State: Missouri
- Date apprehended: 1928

Bertha Alice Williams Graham Gifford (October 30, 1871 – August 20, 1951) was a farmwife in rural Catawissa, Missouri during the early 1900s who was accused of murdering three members of the local community and suspected in 15 additional deaths. Some consider her to be America's fifth solo female serial killer, after Belle Gunness, Lydia Sherman, Jane Toppan, and Nannie Doss.

== Personal life ==
Bertha Alice Williams was born in Morse Mill, Missouri, the daughter of William Poindexter Williams and his wife Matilda, née Lee. She was one of 10 children. She was married to Henry Graham and this union produced one daughter, Lila. Following Graham's death, she married Eugene Gifford and they had one child, James.

== Crimes ==
Gifford was renowned in her community for her cooking skills and caring for sick neighbors and relatives. Gifford acted as nurse for her sick neighbors, and 17 people died in her care. Five of the deaths raised suspicions, leading to a grand jury investigation. This led to the investigation of the other 12 deaths.

In 1928, Gifford was arrested at Eureka, Missouri and charged with three murders. Following the exhumation and post-mortem exams of Edward Brinley and Elmer and Lloyd Schamel, the bodies were found to contain large amounts of arsenic. Gifford was put on trial for their murders in Union, Missouri. Following the three-day trial, she was found not guilty by reason of insanity and committed to the Missouri State Hospital #4, a psychiatric institution, where she remained until her death in 1951.

Given the high mortality rates and the unregulated use of arsenic for medical and other purposes at the time, it is not certain that she intentionally killed people who had been in her care.

== See also ==
- List of serial killers in the United States
- List of serial killers by number of victims
