= Oermann, Missouri =

Unincorporated community in Missouri, U.S.

Coordinates: 38°18′29″N 90°43′24″W

Oermann is an unincorporated community in western Jefferson County, in the U.S. state of Missouri. The community is located on Missouri Route 30 approximately two miles northeast of Grubville and two miles southwest of Dittmer.

== History ==
A post office called Oermann was established in 1888, and remained in operation until 1955. Charles Oermann, an early postmaster, gave the community his last name.
