= Iron Mountain Baby =

American folk song

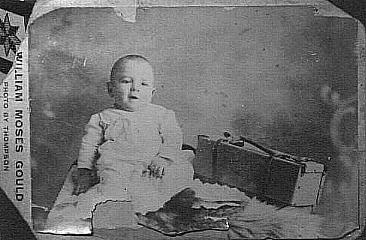
The baby and the infamous valise

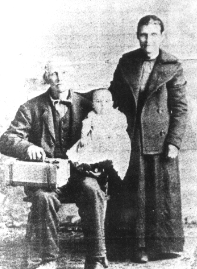
William Moses Gould Helms and his rescuers

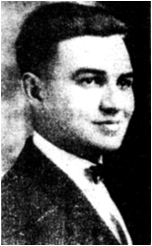
Helms as a young man

Iron Mountain Baby refers both to a folk song and the subject of that song, William Moses Gould Helms.

== Background ==
On August 14, 1902, William Helms (June 5, 1835 – December 13, 1917), a 67-year-old farmer and Civil War veteran, was walking along the St. Louis, Iron Mountain and Southern Railway (later the Missouri Pacific Railroad) where it crosses Big River outside of Irondale (Washington County, Missouri), collecting lumber for a barn he intended to build. He saw No. 4 speed northbound over the bridge. Then, hearing a strange noise and following its source, he found what is described as "an old fashioned telescoping valise." The case turned out to contain a baby, whose age was later estimated at approximately five days. Having fallen about 50 feet (15 m), the child was badly bruised, with a pronounced dent in his head. Helms took the child home to his wife, Sarah Jane Knight Helms (July 10, 1850 – April 15, 1925) and they nursed him back to health.

The child was named for his foster father, Bill Helms, and "Gould," the owner of the railroad, but also "Moses," because he was taken from the river. The story spread throughout the United States, and gave rise to the folk song. Many women came forward, claiming to be the boy's mother. However, when the child was six years old, the elderly couple formally adopted him.

After the death of the elder Helms, William and his adoptive mother moved to Salem, Missouri. He attended Braughton's University and Southwest Missouri State Teachers College (now Missouri State University); his education was paid for by the St. Louis Iron Mountain & Southern Railway. He became a printer.

On August 5, 1933 he married a woman named "Sally," (September 17, 1904, d. Racine, Wisconsin, September 1987). They later moved to Texas. They had one son, William (died at age 21).

William died in Texas, January 31, 1953, aged 50. When the corpse was carried by train back to Washington County, it was only the second time William had ridden a train. He was interred at Hopewell, Missouri Cemetery. The funeral got no publicity; Helms did not enjoy his peculiar fame.

== "The Ballad of the Iron Mountain Baby" ==
The following are the first published lyrics of the ballad, written by Rev. J.T. Barton in late 1902 or early 1903, which is said to have had 14 stanzas. As with most folk songs, the details of the lyrics do not exactly match what happened historically.

I have a song I'd like to sing
It's awful but it's true
About a baby, thrown from a train
By a woman, I know not who.

Th' train was running at full speed
T'was northbound number nine (actually was Northbound Number Four, and the rhyme scheme suggests that Barton knew this)
An' as it crossed th' river's bridge
She cast it from the door.

A Mother unkind, a Father untrue
And yet, I'm bound to say
It must have grieved that Mother's heart
To cast her baby away.

The leaves (i.e., valise) in which this baby was found
Was fourteen inches long
Five inches wide, six inches deep
An', O, so closely bound.

It was Bill Williams who found this babe (actually was Bill Helms; it was probably corrupted to Williams due to phonetic similarity)
He heard its helpless cry
He took it to his loving wife;
She would not let it die.

She bathed and washed its little head
An' soon, it hushed its cry
God bless them both while they live
God bless them when they die.

We'll name him William Roscoe (he was actually given the name William Moses)
Because he has no name
Then, if he grows to be a man
He'll wear it just th' same.

This ends my song, my story I've told
I'll say, goodbye to all
Until we meet around the throne
In that bright world above all.

The story is also the subject of the song, "Sarah Jane and the Iron Mountain Baby," from the 2013 album Love Has Come for You by Steve Martin and Edie Brickell. A version of the events of the story contribute to the plot of Bright Star, a 2014 musical by Steve Martin and Edie Brickell.

== See also ==
Boswell, Evault. The Iron Mountain Baby: A Novel. iUniverse, Inc. 2007. ISBN 978-0-595-85098-3

== Sources ==
- Carrolscorner.net credits "All Aboard" newspaper, Jackson, Mo., 1998 edition;
- "Iron Mountain Baby," Sandra Braggs and Heather Click, re-edited from All Aboard vol 19, (St. Louis Iron Mountain & Southern Railway) slimrr.com
- Another version of the events
