= Eaton Branch =

Coordinates: 37.872551°N 90.588460°W

Location
- Country: United States
- State: Missouri
- County: St. Francois

Physical characteristics
- Mouth: Big River

Eaton Branch is a stream in St. Francois County in the U.S. state of Missouri. It is a tributary of the Big River.

Eaton Branch has the name of Jesse Eaton, original owner of the site.

== See also ==
- List of rivers of Missouri
