= Hayden Creek (Missouri) =

Stream in the U.S. state of Missouri

Coordinates: 37.8622727°N 90.6251269°W

Hayden Creek is a stream in St. Francois County in the U.S. state of Missouri. It is a tributary of the Big River.

Hayden Creek has the name of the original owner of the site.

== See also ==
- List of rivers of Missouri
