= Smith Branch (Willow Fork tributary) =

Stream in the American state of Missouri

Coordinates: 38.628078°N 92.785471°W

Smith Branch is a stream in Moniteau County in the U.S. state of Missouri. It is a tributary of Willow Fork.

Smith Branch has the name of A. Smith, a pioneer citizen.

== See also ==
- List of rivers of Missouri
