= Skullbones Creek =

Stream in the American state of Missouri

Coordinates: 38°20′42″N 90°39′09″W

Skullbones Creek or Skullbone Creek is a stream in Jefferson County in the U.S. state of Missouri. It is a tributary of Big River.

The confluence with Big River is adjacent to Missouri Route 30 just southeast of Cedar Hill.

Tradition has it a human skull was found along the course of Skullbones Creek, which accounts for the name.

== See also ==
- List of rivers of Missouri
