= Bear Creek (Big River tributary) =

Stream in Missouri, U.S.

Bear Creek is a stream in northwestern St. Francois County in the U.S. state of Missouri. It is a tributary of the Big River.

The stream headwaters arise in the Terre du Lac recreation community west of Bonne Terre at 37°55′06″N 90°37′12″W and the stream flows north passing under Missouri Route 47 and on to its confluence with the Big River at 37°58′58″N 90°36′09″W.

According to tradition, bear wallows in the area account for the name.

== See also ==
- List of rivers of Missouri
