= Janes Creek =

Stream in the American state of Missouri

Location
- Country: United States
- State: Missouri
- Region: Washington and Iron counties

Physical characteristics
- Source
  - location: Iron County, Missouri
  - coordinates: 37°42′24″N 90°51′12″W
- Mouth
  - location: Washington County
  - coordinates: 37°46′07″N 90°51′52″W
  - elevation: 272 m (892 ft)

Janes Creek is a stream in Iron and Washington counties of the U.S. state of Missouri. It is a tributary of Big River. The headwaters of the stream arise in Kaolin Township, Iron County, just north of Missouri Route 32 west of Banner. The confluence with Big River is in southern Washington County between Peoria and Belgrade adjacent to Missouri Route JJ.

The namesake of Janes Creek is unknown.

== See also ==
- List of rivers of Missouri
