= Clancy Branch =

Stream in the American state of Missouri

Coordinates: 38.0614404°N 90.6592955°W

Clancy Branch is a stream in the U.S. state of Missouri. It is a tributary of Maddin Creek.

Clancy Branch has the name of the local Clancy family.

== See also ==
- List of rivers of Missouri
