= Bouyer Creek =

Stream in the US state of Missouri

Coordinates: 37.9219967°N 90.4129010°W

Bouyer Creek is a stream in St. Francois County in the U.S. state of Missouri. It is a tributary of the Terre Bleue Creek.

A variant name was "Boyers Run". The creek has the name of Boyer, a pioneer citizen.

== See also ==
- List of rivers of Missouri
