= Enough, Missouri =

- Former community
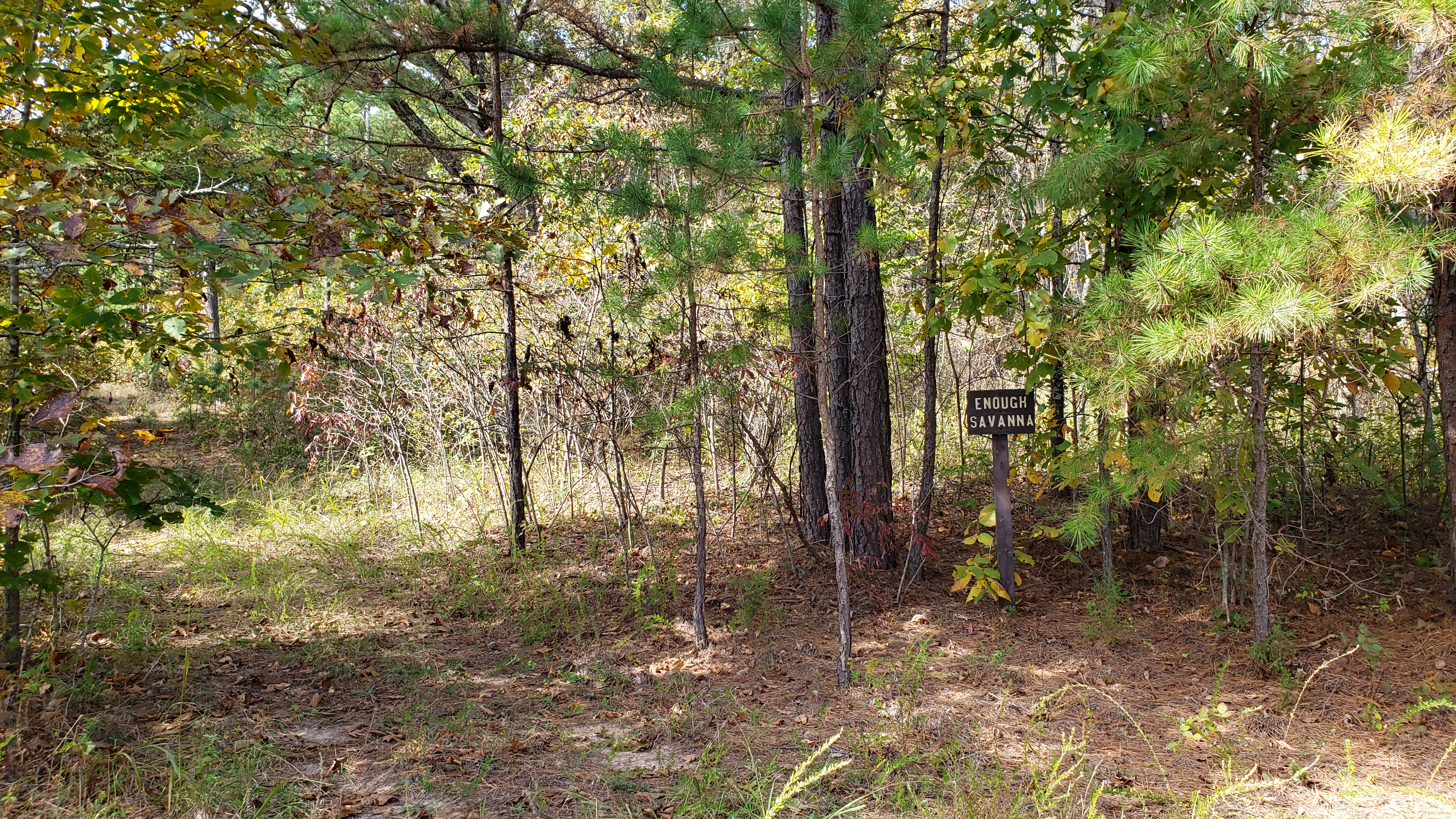
- A forest service sign at the site of Enough

- Location within Missouri Location within the United States
- Coordinates: 37°42′26″N 90°55′00″W
- Country: United States
- State: Missouri
- County: Iron
- Elevation: 1,109 ft (338 m)
- Time zone: UTC-6 (Central (CST))
  - Summer (DST): UTC-5 (CDT)
- GNIS feature ID: 749848

Enough (/ˈiːnʌf/ EE-nuf) is a ghost town in Kaolin Township, Iron County, in the U.S. state of Missouri. It lies near the headwaters of the Big River. The site is now part of Mark Twain National Forest at the south end of Council Bluff Lake, created in 1981. The Forest Service has a boat ramp for the lake at Enough.

== History ==
Enough had a post office that operated from 1918 to 1936. The community's new postmaster sent about 200 naming suggestions to post officials, who "said that was enough and named the post office Enough". The community was named by postal officials who informed the imaginative postmaster that his hundreds of naming suggestions were "enough".
