= Furnace Creek =

Furnace Creek may refer to:

== Populated places ==
- Furnace Creek, California in Inyo County

== Streams ==
- Furnace Creek, Mono County, California
- Furnace Creek, Madison County, Georgia
- Furnace Creek, Walker County, Georgia
- Furnace Creek, Lemhi County, Idaho
- Furnace Creek, Jo Daviess County, Illinois
- Furnace Branch in Frederick County
- Furnace Creek (or Furnace Branch), meeting Marley Creek to form Curtis Creek, Anne Arundel County and southern Baltimore, Maryland
- Furnace Creek, Grundy County, Missouri
- Furnace Creek (Big River tributary), Washington County, Missouri
- Furnace Creek, Oneida County, New York
- Furnace Creek, Berks County, Pennsylvania
- Furnace Creek, York County, Pennsylvania
- Furnace Creek, Cherokee County, South Carolina
- Furnace Creek, Dickson County, Tennessee
- Furnace Creek, Johnson County, Tennessee
- Furnace Creek, Floyd County, Virginia
- Furnace Creek, Franklin County, Virginia
- Furnace Creek, Lafayette County, Wisconsin
- Furnace Creek, Sauk County, Wisconsin

== See also ==
- Furnace Creek Wash, Inyo County, California
- South Fork Furnace Creek and East Fork Furnace Creek, Johnson County, Tennessee
- East Prong Furnace Creek and West Prong Furnace Creek, Floyd County, Virginia
- Furnace Run (disambiguation)
