= Cedar Run (Missouri) =

Stream in the American state of Missouri

Coordinates: 37.9042184°N 90.4942915°W

Cedar Run is a stream in St. Francois County in the U.S. state of Missouri. It is a tributary of the Big River.

Cedar Run was so named on account of cedar trees near its course.

== See also ==
- List of rivers of Missouri
