= Clear Creek (Big River tributary) =

Stream in Missouri, United States

Coordinates: 37.79846°N 90.79876°W

Clear Creek is a stream in Washington County in the U.S. state of Missouri. It is a tributary of the Big River.

Clear Creek was so named on account of its clear water.

== See also ==
- List of rivers of Missouri
