= Mill Creek (Big River tributary) =

Stream in the U.S. state of Missouri

Mill Creek is a stream in Washington and St. Francois counties of eastern Missouri. It is a tributary of the Big River. The stream source is located at: 37°56′29″N 90°43′25″W near Mineral Point and the confluence with Big River is at: 38°02′10″N 90°37′11″W just south of Blackwell.

== See also ==
- List of rivers of Missouri
