= Terre Bleue Creek =

Stream in Missouri, USA

Terre Bleue Creek Tributary to Big River
- Location of Terre Bleue Creek mouth Terre Bleue Creek (the United States)

Location
- Country: United States
- State: Missouri
- County: St. Francois

Physical characteristics
- Source: Hickory Creek divide
  - location: about 3 miles south of Goose Creek Lake
  - coordinates: 37°52′32.19″N 090°19′12.44″W
  - elevation: 990 ft (300 m)
- Mouth: Big River
  - location: about 2 miles northeast of Bonne Terre, Missouri
  - coordinates: 37°56′29.19″N 090°30′59.45″W
  - elevation: 627 ft (191 m)
- Length: 21.73 mi (34.97 km)
- Basin size: 66.28 square miles (171.7 km^{2})
- Discharge
  - location: Big River
  - average: 85.39 cu ft/s (2.418 m^{3}/s) at mouth with Big River

Basin features
- Progression: Big River → Meramec River → Mississippi River → Gulf of Mexico
- River system: Big River
- Tributaries
  - left: Salem Creek
  - right: Bear Creek; Andrews Branch; Bouyer Creek; Dry Branch; Hazel Run; Pike Run
- Bridges: McCord Road, State Road EE, Highway JJ, Highway D, Hillsboro Road, Highway K

Terre Bleue Creek is a stream in St. Francois and Ste. Genevieve counties of eastern Missouri. It is a tributary of the Big River.

Terre Bleue Creek was so named on account of the color of the dirt on its course, terre bleue being a name meaning "blue earth" in French.

== Variant names ==
According to the Geographic Names Information System, it has also been known historically as:

- Terre Bleu Creek
- Terre Blue Creek

== See also ==
- List of rivers of Missouri
