= Peter Cave Hollow =

Valley in Missouri, United States

Coordinates: 37.6372696°N 90.9115161°W

Peter Cave Hollow is a valley in Kaolin Township, Iron County in the U.S. state of Missouri. It is at an elevation of 955 feet (291 meters) above mean sea level (MSL).

Peter Cave Hollow most likely was so named on account of deposits of saltpetre.
