= Dent Branch =

Stream in the American state of Missouri

Coordinates: 37.797271°N 90.799296°W

Dent Branch is a stream in Washington County in the U.S. state of Missouri. It is a tributary of the Big River.

A variant name was "Dents Branch". The stream has the name of the local Dent family.

== See also ==
- List of rivers of Missouri
