= Ditch Creek =

Stream in the American state of Missouri

Coordinates: 38°13′46″N 90°44′19″W

Ditch Creek is a stream in Washington and Jefferson counties, Missouri. It is a tributary of the Big River.

The source is located within a mine tailings pond in northeastern Washington County approximately one mile northeast of Richwoods at . The stream flows to the northeast into western Jefferson County to its confluence with Big River at .

The creek most likely took its name from a nearby lead mine situated in a ditch.

== See also ==
- List of rivers of Missouri
