= Three Hill Creek =

Stream in the U.S. state of Missouri

Three Hill Creek is a stream in St. Francois and Washington counties in the U.S. state of Missouri. It is a tributary of Big River.

The stream headwaters arise in Washington County at 37°54′35″N 90°39′20″W with an elevation of 960 feet. The stream flows to the north-northeast crossing into St. Francois County and under Missouri Route 47 roughly two miles north of the source. The stream confluence with Big River is five miles northwest of Bonne Terre at 37°59′17″N 90°36′34″W and an elevation of 594 feet.

Three Hill Creek was so named on account of three hills near its headwaters.

== See also ==
- List of rivers of Missouri
