= Kaolin Township, Iron County, Missouri =

Township in Iron County, Missouri, U.S.

Coordinates: 37.6397°N 90.8814°W

Kaolin Township is an inactive township in Iron County, in the U.S. state of Missouri.

Kaolin Township was established in 1857, and named for deposits of kaolin within its borders.

== Geography ==
Streams that rise in the township include the Big River, Janes Creek, and Panther Branch. Kaolin Creek rises one-half mile north of the township.

Peter Cave Hollow is located in the central region of the township.
