= Bear Creek (Terre Bleue Creek tributary) =

Stream in Missouri, U.S.

Coordinates: 37.9075523°N 90.3981785°W

Bear Creek is a stream in Ste. Genevieve County in the U.S. state of Missouri. It is a tributary of Terre Bleue Creek.

Bear Creek most likely was so named on account of bears near its course.

== See also ==
- List of rivers of Missouri
