= Belews Creek (Missouri) =

River in Missouri, United States of America

Belews Creek is a stream in Jefferson County, Missouri. It is a tributary to Big River.

The source is at 38°13′34″N 90°34′32″W and the confluence is at 38°20′15″N 90°37′38″W.

Belews Creek has the name of William Belew, a pioneer citizen.

== See also ==
- List of rivers of Missouri
