= Furnace Run =

Furnace Run may refer to:

- Furnace Run (Catawissa Creek), in Columbia County, Pennsylvania
- Furnace Run (Shamokin Creek), in Northumberland County, Pennsylvania

== See also ==
- Furnace Creek (disambiguation)
