= Shaw Branch (Flat River tributary) =

Stream in the American state of Missouri

Coordinates: 37.847829°N 90.516791°W

Shaw Branch is a stream in St. Francois County in the U.S. state of Missouri. It is a tributary of the Flat River.

Shaw Branch was named after the Shaw family, who were early settlers in the area.

== See also ==
- List of rivers of Missouri
