= Hazel Run (Terre Bleue Creek tributary) =

Stream in the US state of Missouri

Hazel Run is a stream in northeastern St. Francois County in the U.S. state of Missouri. It is a tributary of the Terre Bleue Creek.

The stream headwaters arise northeast of the community of Hazel Run and it flows west passing about one-half mile north of Hazel Run to its confluence with Terre Bleue Creek about three quarters of a mile northeast of that stream's confluence with Big River.

The source area is at 37°57′03″N 90°26′41″W and the confluence is at 37°56′55″N 90°29′35″W.

Hazel Run was so named on account of hazel trees near its course.

== See also ==
- List of rivers of Missouri
