= Dry Branch (Terre Bleue Creek tributary) =

Stream in the US state of Missouri

Coordinates: 37.9267187°N 90.4654021°W

Dry Branch is a stream in St. Francois County in the U.S. state of Missouri. It is a tributary of the Terre Bleue Creek.

Dry Branch was named for the fact it often runs dry.

== See also ==
- List of rivers of Missouri
