= Maddin Creek =

Stream in the American state of Missouri

Coordinates: 38.0808851°N 90.6567954°W

Maddin Creek is a stream in Washington County in the U.S. state of Missouri. Clancy Branch is one of its tributaries, and it is itself a tributary of the Big River.

Maddin Creek, historically spelled "Madden Branch", has the name of the local Madden family.

== See also ==
- List of rivers of Missouri
