= Willow Fork =

Stream in the U.S. state of Missouri

Willow Fork (also called Willow Creek) is a stream in Moniteau County in the U.S. state of Missouri. It is a tributary of North Moreau Creek.

The stream headwaters arise at 38°39′30″N 92°49′33″W at an elevation of 950 feet just south of U.S. Route 50 about one mile west of Tipton. The stream flows generally to the southeast for approximately seven miles to its confluence with the North Moreau at 38°36′08″N 92°41′40″W at an elevation of 761 feet.

Willow Fork was so named due to the presence of willow trees along its course.

== See also ==
- List of rivers of Missouri
