= Kaolin (band) =

French rock band

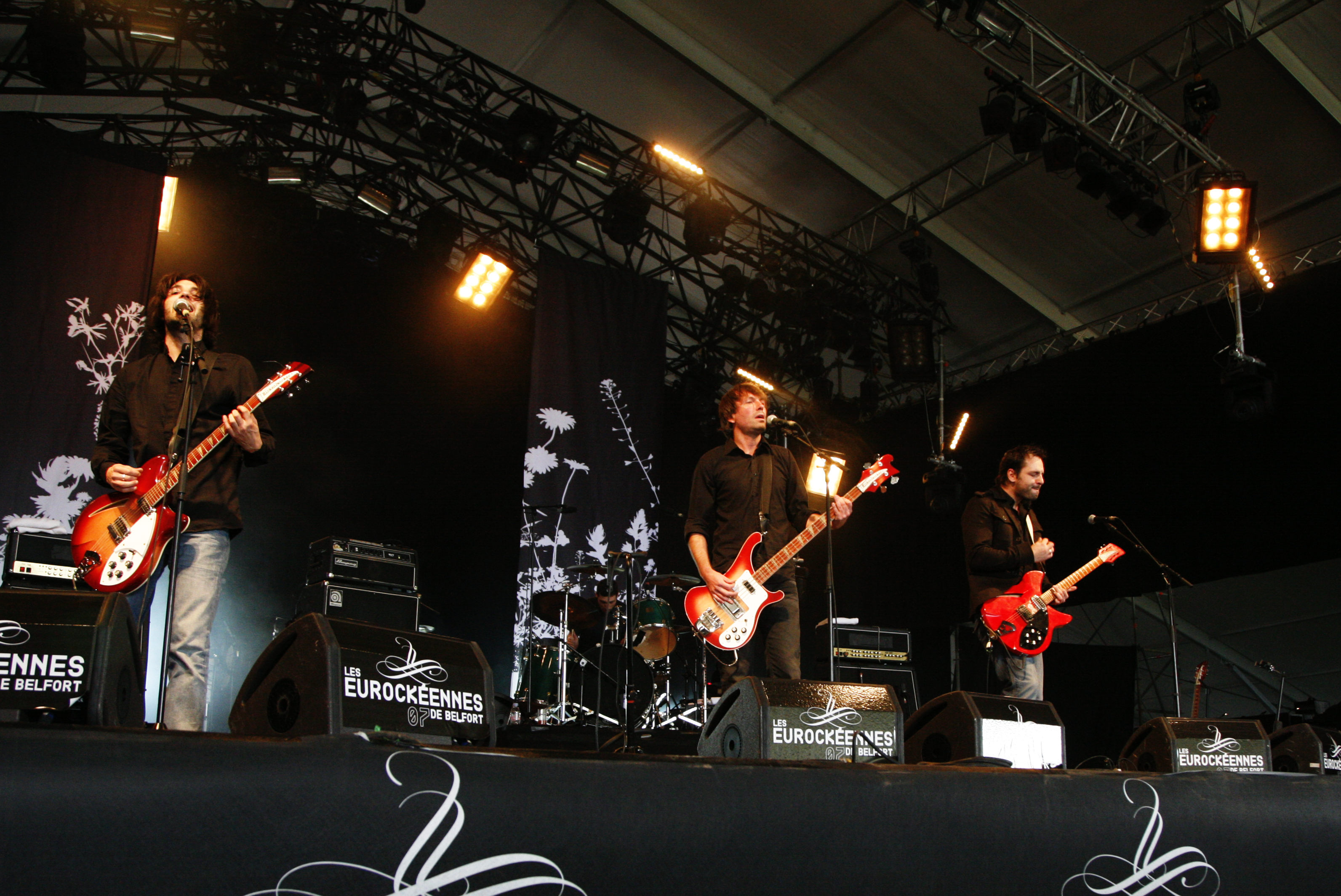
- Kaolin in concert at Eurockéennes in 2007.

Background information
- Origin: France
- Genres: Pop rock, folk rock, post-rock
- Years active: 1999–2014
- Labels: Kaolin, Barclay, At(h)ome, Cinq7, Verycords
- Past members: Guillaume Cantillon; Ludwig Martins; Julien Cantillon; Olivier Valty; Vivien Bouchet

Kaolin is a French rock group from Montluçon, in the Allier department. Their musical style, with diverse influences but lyrics firmly rooted in the French language, ranges from atmospheric post-rock to aggressive power pop.

Throughout their career, which includes two self-produced EPs and five studio albums, they have collaborated with Les Valentins, Paul Corkett (The Cure, Placebo), and Dave Fridmann (Mogwai, The Flaming Lips, Weezer). The group disbanded in 2014.

== Biography ==
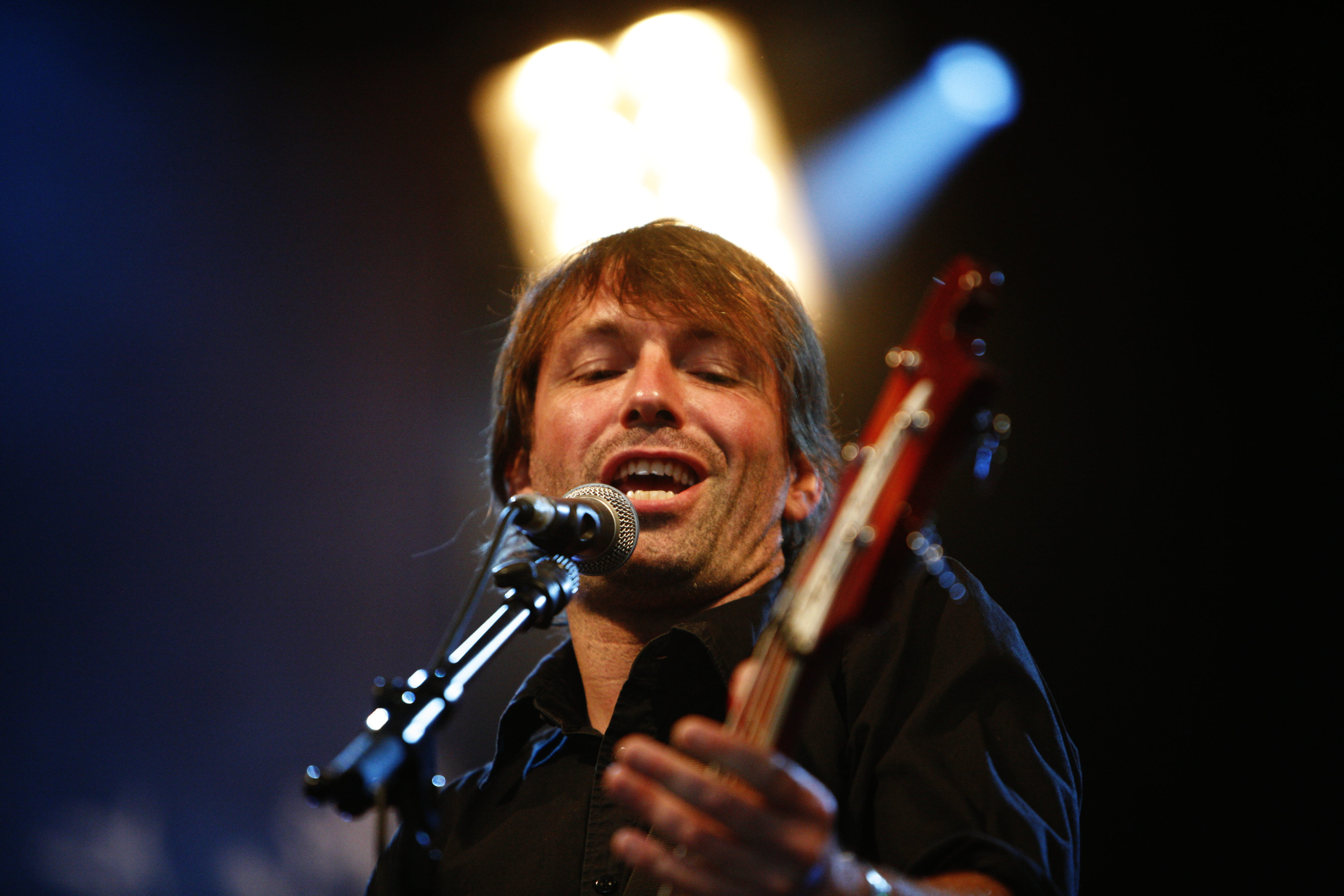
Guillaume Cantillon.

Originally from Montluçon, Kaolin remains attached to their Bourbonnais roots and continues to rehearse in this city (the Cantillon brothers lived in Amiens, northern France until around the age of 10).

The group released their first EP, titled Purs moments in 1999. In 2002, their debut album Allez was a success and regularly aired on rock radio stations. Following the moderate success of their second album, De retour dans nos criques, released in 2004, the Barclay record labl decided to end their collaboration, preferring more profitable artists.

Their third album Mélanger les couleurs was released in September 2006 on the independent label At(h)ome. This would be their most popular and commercially successful album, mainly thanks to the hit Partons vite which is very similar to Bob Dylan's I Want You. This similarity was fully embraced and claimed by the group.

In parallel, lead singer Guillaume Cantillon pursued a solo career, allowing him to explore more personal themes. In 2008, he released his first solo album titled Des ballons rouges under the independent label Cinq7.

In October 2010, after a four-year wait, Kaolin released their fourth album, also titled Kaolin, produced by Jean-Louis Piérot. Their fifth album, Un souffle sur la roche, was released in September 2013. The members of the group announced their separation on June 5, 2014.

Since 2017, Guillaume Cantillon has continued his solo career under the name Courcheval. The LP was released in October 2022.

== Members ==
- Vivien Bouchet – guitar, vocal
- Guillaume Cantillon – vocal, bass
- Julien "June" Cantillon – guitar, vocal
- Ludwig "Lulu" Martins – guitar, vocal
- Olivier Valty – drums

== Discography ==
=== Studio albums ===
2002: Allez
1. Histoire de dire
2. Pour le peu
3. Laisse
4. Que tout se fasse
5. Devant ce site
6. Quand Laetitia C... !
7. Le haut est essentiel
8. Oublier encore
9. Sous ce pli
10. Quelques mots
11. Calme
12. Les nageuses
2004: De retour dans nos criques
1. Loin de l'île
2. Plages et gazole
3. Cette roche
4. C'est la vie
5. Shalem
6. Dérangé
7. De retour dans nos criques
8. Vide et silence
9. Jusqu'à la peau
10. Ne dis rien
11. Caraïbes
2006: Mélanger les couleurs
1. Beach Party
2. Partons vite
3. J'irai mélanger les couleurs
4. Je reviens
5. Cherche des poux
6. Sur le cœur
7. Belle évidence
8. Gretta
9. Club 35
10. Lilla Huset
11. Fais semblant
12. J'insiste
2010: Kaolin
1. Le geste
2. On s'en va
3. Bang Bang
4. Crois-moi
5. Petite peste
6. Tu m'emmerdes
7. Plus rien
8. C'est mieux comme ça
9. Sans importance
10. Cody
11. Shanana
12. Le monde court toujours
13. Ce matin
2013: Un souffle sur la roche
1. Fondamentalement
2. Sans Toi
3. Almeria
4. Le Décor
5. Plonger
6. Evidemment
7. Je ne m'y fais pas
8. J'ai dû partir
9. Sur tes lèvres
10. Particules de rêves

=== EPs ===
1999: Purs moments
1. Mathis
2. Le haut est essentiel (1st version)
3. 5:38 avec les baleines
4. Histoires étranges
5. 2 anges
6. Les vagues
2001: Bienvenue dans les criques
1. Que tout se fasse (1st version)
2. Histoire de dire (1st version)
3. Tournez tournez
4. Quand Laetitia C... ! (1st version)
5. #a-bis
6. Bienvenue dans les criques
2010: Kaolin
1. Bang Bang
2. Crois-moi
3. Anna

=== Singles ===
2003: Pour le peu
1. Pour le peu
2. Aloha
2003: Le haut est essentiel
1. Le haut est essentiel
2004: Loin de l'île
1. Loin de l'île
2. Plages et gazole
3. Bikini (unreleased)
4. Calme (live)
2005: C'est la vie (with Dionysos)
1. C'est la vie (with Dionysos)
2. Dance with your Ukulélé
3. Kaolinchka feat Dioninchka
4. Loin de l'île (video)
5. Session acoustique (Oüi FM)
2005: Ange
1. Ange (unreleased)
2006: Kaolin
2010: Partons vite
1. Partons vite
2. Belle Evidence
2007: Sur le cœur
1. Sur le cœur (new version)
2010: Kaolin
1. Crois moi
