= Furnace, West Virginia =

Unincorporated community in West Virginia, United States

- Unincorporated community
- Location within West Virginia Location within the United States
- Coordinates: 39°1′57″N 78°36′10″W
- Country: United States
- State: West Virginia
- County: Hardy
- Elevation: 1,332 ft (406 m)
- Time zone: UTC-5 (Eastern (EST))
  - Summer (DST): UTC-4 (EDT)
- GNIS ID: 1556839

Furnace was an unincorporated community in Hardy County, West Virginia, United States.
