= Furnace, Carmarthenshire =

Village in Carmarthenshire, Wales

Coordinates: 51.690°N 4.167°W

Furnace: Welsh: Ffwrnes
- Village
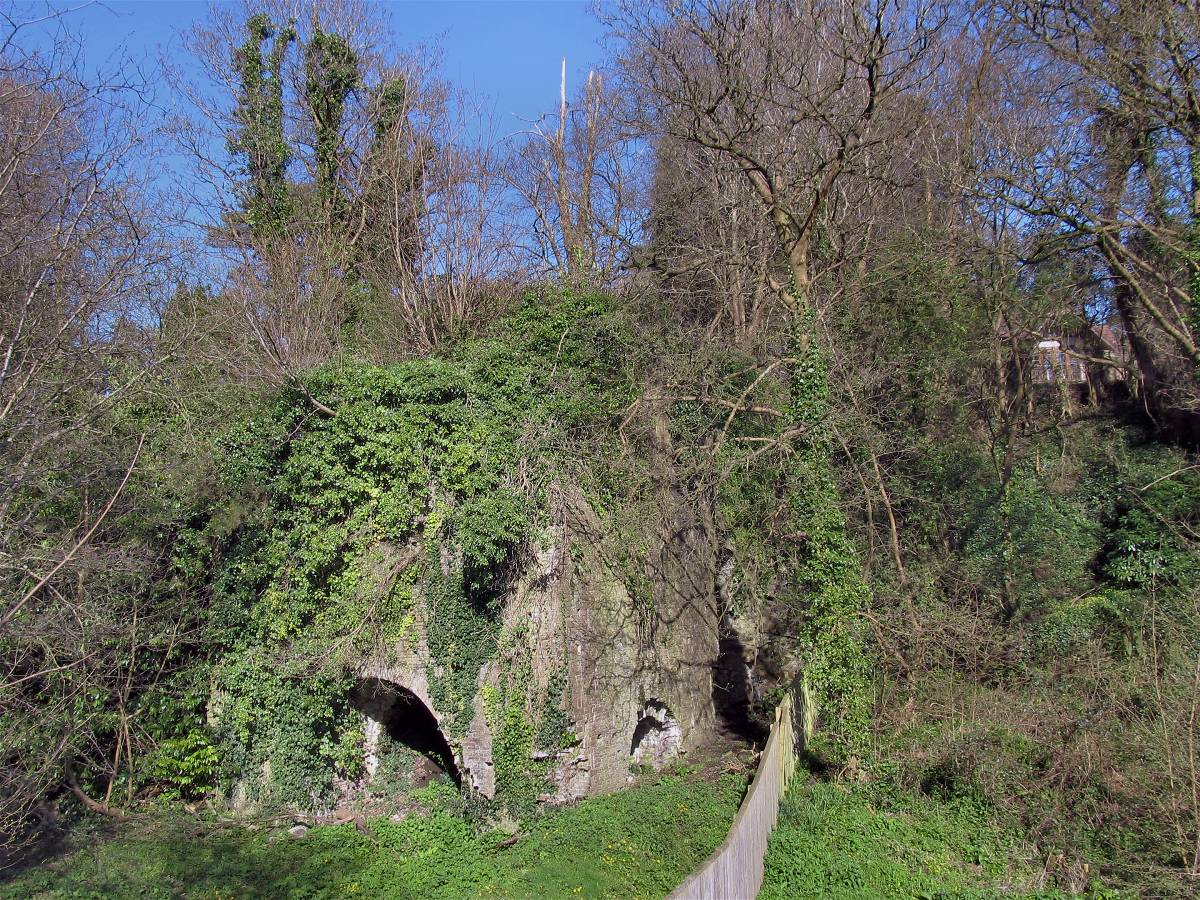
- Raby’s Furnace

- Location within Carmarthenshire
- OS grid reference: SN503013
- Community: Llanelli Rural
- Principal area: Carmarthenshire
- Preserved county: Dyfed
- Country: Wales
- Sovereign state: United Kingdom
- Post town: LLANELLI
- Postcode district: SA15
- Dialling code: 01554
- Police: Dyfed-Powys
- Fire: Mid and West Wales
- Ambulance: Welsh
- UK Parliament: Llanelli
- Senedd Cymru – Welsh Parliament: Llanelli

Furnace (Welsh: Ffwrnes) is a village near the town of Llanelli in the county of Carmarthenshire, Wales. It is named after the furnace built by Alexander Raby before the village was established. The main furnace remains but is neglected and in ruin.

Before the name 'Ffwrnes' or 'Furnace' was evident, the small hamlet was called 'Cwmddyche'; this consisted of a few farmsteads and Bryn-y-môr house, which is Stradey Park Hotel today. The village is at the mouth of a valley in which the Afon Cille flows. Llyn Trebeddrod or Furnace Pond is also within the village boundaries, and was constructed as a reservoir to serve the furnaces.

It is under the authority of Carmarthenshire County Council and Llanelli Rural Council.

== Stradey Park hotel controversy ==
In 2023 the village came under the limelight when plans were announced that its 4-star Stradey Park Hotel would be used to accommodate asylum seekers. These plans led to the dismissal of 95 staff from the hotel. The Furnace Action Committee was formed to oppose the plans and led protests outside the site. Counter-protests were led by the Llanelli branch of Stand Up to Racism with support from TUC Cymru. Incidents at some protests on the site led to arrests and charges. Some reports linked far-right groups with the protests.
