= Coonville Creek =

Stream in Missouri, U.S.

Coordinates: 37.9667184°N 90.5342927°W

Coonville Creek is a stream in St. Francois County in the U.S. state of Missouri.

Coonville Creek was so named on account of raccoons near its course.

== See also ==
- List of rivers of Missouri
