= Furnace Creek (Big River tributary) =

Stream in the US state of Missouri

Furnace Creek is a stream in Washington County in the U.S. state of Missouri. It is a tributary of the Big River.

The stream headwaters are at 37°52′12″N 90°47′40″W about five miles south of Potosi and the stream flows south to southeast to its confluence with the Big River is at 37°48′42″N 90°46′20″W adjacent to Missouri Route 21 three miles north of Caledonia.

Furnace Creek was named for a blast furnace near its course.

== See also ==
- List of rivers of Missouri
