= St. Francois State Park =

State park in Missouri, United States

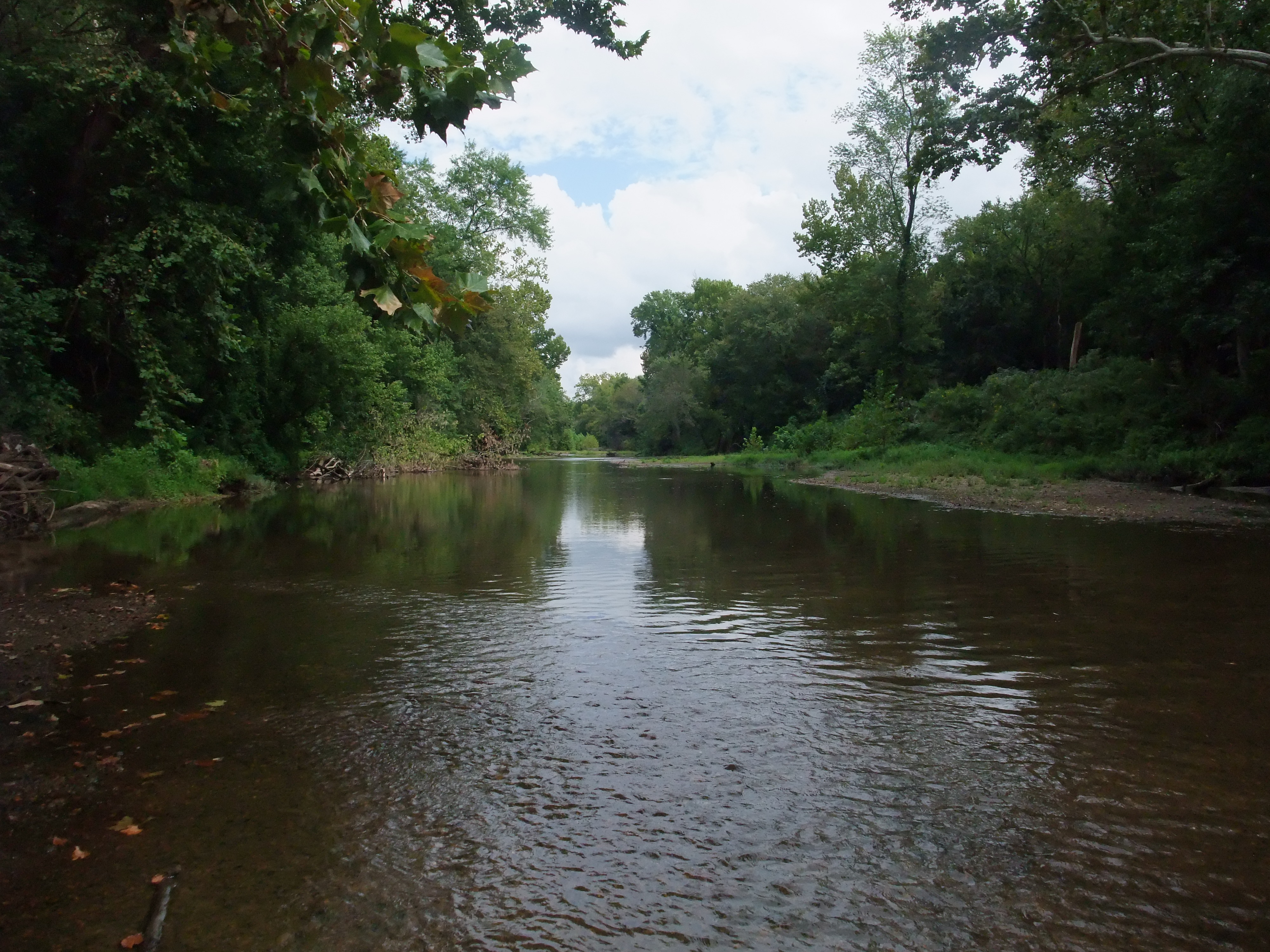
- The Big River

- Location within Missouri Location within the United States
- Location: St. Francois County, Missouri, United States
- Coordinates: 37°58′13″N 90°32′00″W
- Area: 2,734.97 acres (1,106.80 ha)
- Elevation: 771 ft (235 m)
- Established: 1964
- Administrator: Missouri Department of Natural Resources
- Visitors: 212,043 (in 2023)
- Website: Official website

St. Francois State Park is a public recreation area occupying 2,735 acres (1,107 ha) five miles (8.0 km) north of Bonne Terre in St. Francois County, Missouri. The state park features a campground, trails for hiking and horseback riding, and fishing on the Big River. The 49-acre (20 ha) Coonville Creek Natural Area, made up of Coonville Creek and its narrow valley, is found within the park's boundaries.
