= Pike Run (Juniata River tributary) =

Stream in Pennsylvania, U.S.

Coordinates: 40°26′42″N 77°57′35″W

Pike Run is a stream in the U.S. state of Pennsylvania. It is a tributary to the Juniata River.

Pike Run was so named on account of its stock of pike fish.
