= Brock Creek (Missouri) =

Stream in the American state of Missouri

Coordinates: 37°46′38″N 90°51′31″W

Brock Creek is a stream in Washington County in the U.S. state of Missouri. It is a tributary of the Big River.

Brock Creek has the name of one Mr. Brock, an early settler.

== See also ==
- List of rivers of Missouri
