= Sam Branch =

Stream in the American state of Missouri

Coordinates: 37.705047°N 90.915407°W

Sam Branch is a stream in Iron County in the U.S. state of Missouri.

Sam Branch has the name of Sam Williamson, an early settler.

== See also ==
- List of rivers of Missouri
