= Big River (Missouri) =

River in Missouri, U.S.

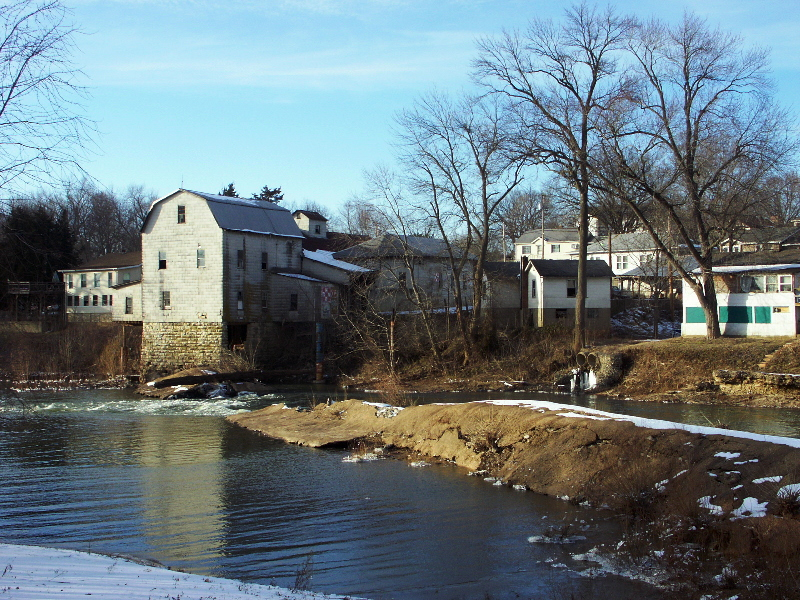
- Dam at Cedar Hill, Missouri, on the Big River

- Location of Big River Mouth Big River (Missouri) (the United States)
- Etymology: French: Grande Rivière

Location
- Country: United States
- State: Missouri
- Cities: Caledonia, Irondale, Park Hills, Bonne Terre, Byrnes Mill

Physical characteristics
- Source
  - location: Iron County, Missouri, United States
  - coordinates: 37°41′18″N 90°57′58″W
  - elevation: 1,318 ft (402 m)
- Mouth: Meramec River
  - location: United States
  - coordinates: 38°28′18″N 90°37′05″W
  - elevation: 410 ft (120 m)
- Length: 145 mi (233 km)
- Basin size: 955 sq mi (2,470 km^{2})
- Discharge
  - location: Byrnesville
  - average: 862 cu/ft. per sec.

Basin features
- Tributaries
  - left: Brock Creek, Clear Creek, Furnace Creek, Hopewell Creek, Blay Creek, Cabanne Course, Bear Creek, Three Hill Creek, Maddin Creek, Mineral Fork, Ditch Creek, Maupin Creek, Jones Creek, Skullbones Creek
  - right: Sam Branch, Smith Branch, Janes Creek, Dent Branch, Cedar Creek, Mill Creek, Dry Creek (Washington County), Hayden Creek, Eaton Branch, Flat River, Cedar Run, Pike Run, Coonville Creek, Bee Run, Perkins Creek, Dry Creek (Jefferson County), Belews Creek, Heads Creek

The Big River is a tributary of the Meramec River in east-central Missouri. The river rises in western Iron County near the summit of Johnson Mountain just north of Missouri Route 32 and approximately 3.5 miles southeast of the community of Enough. It flows through Washington, Saint Francois, and Jefferson counties. It forms part of the boundary between Jefferson and Saint Francois counties and also part of the boundary between Jefferson and Washington counties. It empties into the Meramec River opposite Eureka where the Meramec forms the border between Jefferson and Saint Louis counties. The river flows through Washington State Park, St. Francois State Park, and the Lead Belt mining district. The elevation of the river at its source is approximately 1,300 feet (400 m) above sea level and at its mouth about 400 feet (120 m). The length of the river is approximately 145 miles (233 km), while the airline distance between source and mouth is about 56 miles (90 km). Its watershed area is 955 square miles (2,470 km^{2}).

The river flows through or near the communities of Belgrade, Irondale, Park Hills, Bonne Terre, Morse Mill, Cedar Hill, and Byrnes Mill.

Tributaries of the Big River include Flat River, Belews Creek, Turkey Creek, Mill Creek, Mineral Fork, Calico Creek, Heads Creek, Terre Bleue Creek, Ditch Creek, and Jones Creek.

== Character of the river ==
Like many other Ozark streams, the Big River has entrenched meanders; its valley is typically about half a mile wide, sometimes much narrower, and the valley is usually from 150 to 400 feet (46 to 122 m) deep. This indicates that this river formed on a plain near sea level, which give the river its meandering nature, and then was subsequently uplifted, causing entrenchment.

About 83 miles (134 km) are navigable; however, the remains of five small mill dams makes portage necessary, due to drops of several feet or high turbulence. Otherwise, the river is gentle for canoeing, with a Class I difficulty rating. Public parks are adjacent to most of these dams, and are popular fishing spots. Due to steady infeed of springwater, this river is navigable in all seasons.

Major pollution sources near Park Hills are due to historic mining activities, which including erosion from mine tailings piles and leaking mine dams.

Major gamefish commonly found in the river include largemouth bass, smallmouth bass, spotted bass, rock bass, longear sunfish, bluegill, channel catfish, flathead catfish, and redhorse suckers.

== History ==
The name "Big River" is a translation of the French Grande Rivière.

According to the National Weather Service, the maximum flood stage of the Big River at Byrnes Mill occurred on August 21, 1915, and was 30.20 feet (9.20 m), with a flow of roughly 80,000 cubic feet (2,300 m^{3}) per second. Flood stage at Byrnes Mill is 16 feet (4.9 m). The lowest flow measured, 25 cubic feet (0.71 m^{3}) per second, was recorded on August 30, 1936. The average annual discharge here is 862 cubic feet (24.4 m^{3}) per second. August is the month with the lowest average flow, while April has the highest average flow.

== See also ==
- List of Missouri rivers
