= Smith Branch (Clear Fork tributary) =

Stream in the American state of Missouri

Smith Branch is a stream in Montgomery County in the U.S. state of Missouri. It is a tributary of Clear Fork of the Loutre River.

The stream headwaters arise at 38°52′45″N 91°26′06″W and it flows northwest passing under I-70 just south of New Florence. It continues to the west-northwest to its confluence with Clear Fork at 38°56′36″N 91°33′24″W approximately three miles southwest of Montgomery City.

Smith Branch has the name of James Smith, a pioneer citizen.

== See also ==
- List of rivers of Missouri
