= Kaolin and morphine =

Drug for the relief of diarrhoea

Kaolin and morphine mixture is a drug for the relief of acute diarrhoea. The kaolin, a natural or artificial clay, relieves diarrhoea symptoms and the morphine provides pain relief. Mixtures may also contain sodium hydrogen carbonate (sodium bicarbonate) to neutralise excess stomach acid.
