= Shaw Branch (Osage River tributary) =

Stream in the American state of Missouri

Coordinates: 38°03′26″N 94°09′27″W

Shaw Branch is a stream in Bates County in the U.S. state of Missouri. It is a tributary of the Osage River.

Shaw Branch has the name of William Shaw, an early settler.

== See also ==
- List of rivers of Missouri
