= Smith Branch (Iron County, Missouri) =

Stream in the American state of Missouri

Coordinates: 37°43′16″N 90°54′41″W

Smith Branch is a stream in northern Iron County in the U.S. state of Missouri. It is a tributary to Big River within the waters of Council Bluff Lake. It drains the southwest side of Johnson Mountain.

Smith Branch has the name of the local Smith family.

== See also ==
- List of rivers of Missouri
