= Pike Run (Ottawa River tributary) =

Stream in Allen County, Ohio, U.S.

Coordinates: 40°51′05″N 84°11′39″W

Pike Run is a stream in Allen County in the U.S. state of Ohio. The stream runs 8.2 miles (13.2 km) before it empties into the Ottawa River.

Pike Run was so named on account of its stock of pike fish.
