= Byrnes Mill, Missouri =

- City
- Hagemeister House in Byrnes Mill

- Location of Byrnes Mill, Missouri
- Coordinates: 38°26′22″N 90°34′27″W
- Country: United States
- State: Missouri
- County: Jefferson

Government
  - Mayor Pro Tem: Rob Kiczenski

Area
  - Total: 5.26 sq mi (13.63 km^{2})
  - Land: 5.14 sq mi (13.32 km^{2})
  - Water: 0.12 sq mi (0.32 km^{2})
- Elevation: 594 ft (181 m)

Population (2020)
  - Total: 3,173
  - Density: 617/sq mi (238.3/km^{2})
- Time zone: UTC-6 (Central (CST))
  - Summer (DST): UTC-5 (CDT)
- ZIP code: 63051
- Area code: 636
- FIPS code: 29-10240
- GNIS feature ID: 2393486
- Website: www.byrnesmill.org

Byrnes Mill is a city in northern Jefferson County, Missouri, United States. The population was 3,173 at the 2020 census.

== History ==
The settlement was founded by Patrick C. Byrnes, who immigrated from Ireland in 1849. His family established a mill on their 800-acre (320 ha) property. A descendant sold the mill and most of the property in 2008.

The remains of Byrnes Mill, the town's namesake.

== Geography ==
According to the United States Census Bureau, the city has a total area of 5.26 square miles (13.62 km^{2}), of which 5.14 square miles (13.31 km^{2}) is land and 0.12 square miles (0.31 km^{2}) is water.

The city is located on the Big River, and has the ruins of an old mill and dam.

== Demographics ==
Historical population
Census	Pop.	Note	%±
1990	1,578		—
2000	2,376		50.6%
2010	2,781		17.0%
2020	3,173		14.1%
U.S. Decennial Census

=== 2020 census ===
As of the 2020 census, Byrnes Mill had a population of 3,173. The median age was 42.7 years. 22.2% of residents were under the age of 18 and 16.4% of residents were 65 years of age or older. For every 100 females there were 101.2 males, and for every 100 females age 18 and over there were 100.0 males age 18 and over.

95.1% of residents lived in urban areas, while 4.9% lived in rural areas.

There were 1,230 households in Byrnes Mill, of which 33.6% had children under the age of 18 living in them. Of all households, 56.4% were married-couple households, 15.8% were households with a male householder and no spouse or partner present, and 19.1% were households with a female householder and no spouse or partner present. About 20.1% of all households were made up of individuals and 8.4% had someone living alone who was 65 years of age or older.

There were 1,297 housing units, of which 5.2% were vacant. The homeowner vacancy rate was 0.8% and the rental vacancy rate was 11.6%.

Racial composition as of the 2020 census
Race	Number	Percent
White	2,890	91.1%
Black or African American	13	0.4%
American Indian and Alaska Native	10	0.3%
Asian	13	0.4%
Native Hawaiian and Other Pacific Islander	2	0.1%
Some other race	14	0.4%
Two or more races	231	7.3%
Hispanic or Latino (of any race)	59	1.9%

=== 2010 census ===
As of the census of 2010, there were 2,781 people, 1,038 households, and 782 families living in the city. The population density was 541.1 inhabitants per square mile (208.9/km^{2}). There were 1,121 housing units at an average density of 218.1 per square mile (84.2/km^{2}). The racial makeup of the city was 97.4% White, 0.3% African American, 0.5% Native American, 0.3% Asian, 0.5% from other races, and 1.0% from two or more races. Hispanic or Latino of any race were 1.4% of the population.

There were 1,038 households, of which 34.7% had children under the age of 18 living with them, 60.0% were married couples living together, 9.7% had a female householder with no husband present, 5.6% had a male householder with no wife present, and 24.7% were non-families. 19.6% of all households were made up of individuals, and 4.9% had someone living alone who was 65 years of age or older. The average household size was 2.68 and the average family size was 3.04.

The median age in the city was 38.9 years. 24.8% of residents were under the age of 18; 7.3% were between the ages of 18 and 24; 26.4% were from 25 to 44; 32.9% were from 45 to 64; and 8.6% were 65 years of age or older. The gender makeup of the city was 49.6% male and 50.4% female.

=== 2000 census ===
As of the census of 2000, there were 2,376 people, 850 households, and 669 families living in the city. The population density was 479.2 inhabitants per square mile (185.0/km^{2}). There were 935 housing units at an average density of 188.6 per square mile (72.8/km^{2}). The racial makeup of the city was 97.56% White, 0.17% African American, 0.63% Native American, 0.08% Asian, 0.51% from other races, and 1.05% from two or more races. Hispanic or Latino of any race were 1.68% of the population.

There were 850 households, out of which 42.7% had children under the age of 18 living with them, 60.5% were married couples living together, 12.9% had a female householder with no husband present, and 21.2% were non-families. 15.1% of all households were made up of individuals, and 3.4% had someone living alone who was 65 years of age or older. The average household size was 2.80 and the average family size was 3.08.

In the city, the population was spread out, with 29.4% under the age of 18, 9.9% from 18 to 24, 31.8% from 25 to 44, 22.8% from 45 to 64, and 6.1% who were 65 years of age or older. The median age was 32 years. For every 100 females, there were 97.3 males. For every 100 females age 18 and over, there were 97.4 males.

The median income for a household in the city was $51,211, and the median income for a family was $56,029. Males had a median income of $36,389 versus $25,285 for females. The per capita income for the city was $20,278. About 6.3% of families and 7.4% of the population were below the poverty line, including 10.9% of those under age 18 and none of those age 65 or over.

== Municipal Court ==
In Fiscal Year 2013, the Byrnes Mill Municipal Court collected $443,000 in fines on 3,888 cases. With a population of 2,115, this means that Byrnes Mill had 1.8 cases per each person living in the city and collected $205.77 per person in fines. This is the highest amount per person of any municipality in Jefferson County and more than double the amount per person of the next highest municipality, Hillsboro. For its 2012-2013 budget, Byrnes Mill projected the fines from its Municipal Court would account for 30.6% of total city revenue.

As of April 11, 2015, Byrnes Mill is actively opposing Missouri Senate Bill 5 (2015) which would limit the amount of income it could obtain from its Municipal Court to 20% the first year and 10% the following year. The Byrnes Mill Website states on its front page: "It could mean we will no longer be able to support our Police Department and court system."
