= Morse Mill, Missouri =

Unincorporated community in Missouri, U.S.

Coordinates: 38°16′36″N 90°39′11″W

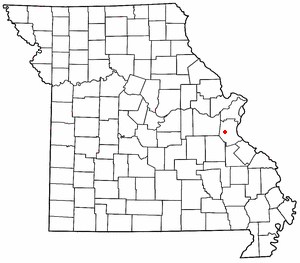

Morse Mill is an unincorporated community in western Jefferson County, Missouri, United States. It is located approximately five miles northwest of Hillsboro along Missouri Route B. The community and mill were located along Big River.

A post office called Morse Mill has been in operation since 1859. The community is named after John H. Morse, the proprietor of a local mill.

== Notable person ==
- Bertha Gifford (1871–1951), serial killer who murdered approximately 17 people
