= Summit, Missouri =

Unincorporated community in Missouri, U.S.

Coordinates: 37°54′43″N 90°42′29″W

Summit is an unincorporated community in eastern Washington County, in the U.S. state of Missouri.

The community is situated on a ridge (elevation 1007 feet) at the intersection of Missouri Route 8 and the Missouri Pacific Railroad line. Potosi is approximately 4.5 miles to the northwest on Route 8.

== History ==
A variant name was "Summitville". A post office called Summitville was established in 1882, the name was changed to Summit in 1886, and the post office closed in 1928. Summit is so named on account of the lofty elevation of the site.
