= Flat River (Missouri) =

Stream in the U.S. state of Missouri

Coordinates: 37°53′31″N 90°29′59″W

The Flat River is a stream in St. Francois County, Missouri. It is a tributary of the Big River.

The stream source is at: and the confluence is at: .

Flat River was so named on account of its flat banks. A variant name was "River la Platte".

== See also ==
- List of rivers of Missouri
