= Ottery Creek =

Stream in the American state of Missouri

Ottery Creek is a stream in Iron and Reynolds counties in the U.S. state of Missouri. It is a tributary to the Middle Fork Black River.

The headwaters arise in Iron County at 37°40′11″N 90°51′16″W and the confluence with Middle Fork in Reynolds County is at 37°34′51″N 90°56′14″W. The source area is just south of Johnson Mountain and the stream flows south-southwest passing under Missouri Route 32 and parallels Missouri Route A through Bell Mountain Wilderness to pass under Missouri Route 49 south of Edgehill and join the Middle Fork.

Ottery Creek derives its name from John Autrey, a pioneer citizen.

== See also ==
- List of rivers of Missouri
