= Hazel Run, Missouri =

Unincorporated community in the U.S. state of Missouri

Coordinates: 37°56′49″N 90°27′56″W

Hazel Run is an unincorporated community in northeastern St. Francois County, in the U.S. state of Missouri. The community is located one-half mile south of Hazel Run creek and approximately five miles east-northeast of Bonne Terre.

== History ==
A post office called Hazel Run was established in 1844, and remained in operation until 1928. The community takes its name from nearby Hazel Run creek.
