= Irondale, Missouri =

- City
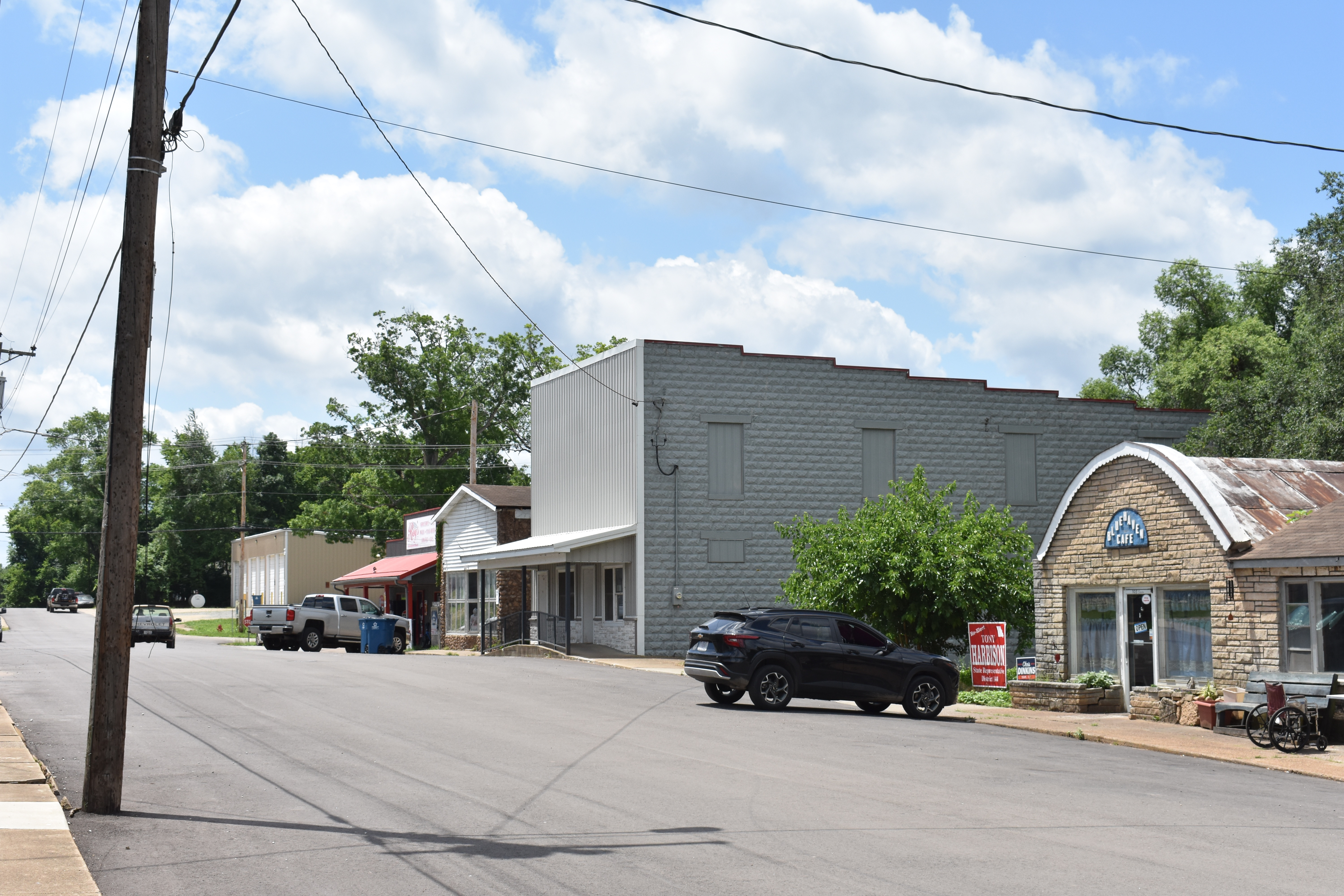
- Irondale in June 2026

- Location of Irondale, Missouri
- Coordinates: 37°50′08″N 90°40′19″W
- Country: United States
- State: Missouri
- County: Washington

Area
  - Total: 0.54 sq mi (1.40 km^{2})
  - Land: 0.53 sq mi (1.38 km^{2})
  - Water: 0.0077 sq mi (0.02 km^{2})
- Elevation: 906 ft (276 m)

Population (2020)
  - Total: 368
  - Density: 691.0/sq mi (266.78/km^{2})
- Time zone: UTC-6 (Central (CST))
  - Summer (DST): UTC-5 (CDT)
- ZIP code: 63648
- Area code: 573
- FIPS code: 29-35396
- GNIS feature ID: 2395437

Irondale is a city in Washington County, Missouri, United States. As of the 2020 census, Irondale had a population of 368.

== Geography ==
Irondale is located at 37°50′7″N 90°40′21″W (37.835204, -90.672505).

According to the United States Census Bureau, the city has a total area of 0.54 square miles (1.40 km^{2}), of which 0.53 square miles (1.37 km^{2}) is land and 0.01 square miles (0.03 km^{2}) is water.

== Demographics ==
Historical population
Census	Pop.	Note	%±
1910	338		—
1920	455		34.6%
1930	395		−13.2%
1940	446		12.9%
1950	443		−0.7%
1960	335		−24.4%
1970	319		−4.8%
1980	349		9.4%
1990	474		35.8%
2000	437		−7.8%
2010	445		1.8%
2020	368		−17.3%
U.S. Decennial Census

=== 2010 census ===
As of the census of 2010, there were 445 people, 160 households, and 122 families living in the city. The population density was 839.6 inhabitants per square mile (324.2/km^{2}). There were 192 housing units at an average density of 362.3 per square mile (139.9/km^{2}). The racial makeup of the city was 97.5% White, 0.2% Native American, and 2.2% from two or more races. Hispanic or Latino of any race were 0.9% of the population.

There were 160 households, of which 39.4% had children under the age of 18 living with them, 55.6% were married couples living together, 15.0% had a female householder with no husband present, 5.6% had a male householder with no wife present, and 23.8% were non-families. 20.6% of all households were made up of individuals, and 6.3% had someone living alone who was 65 years of age or older. The average household size was 2.78 and the average family size was 3.16.

The median age in the city was 36.9 years. 28.5% of residents were under the age of 18; 7.2% were between the ages of 18 and 24; 24.7% were from 25 to 44; 27.2% were from 45 to 64; and 12.4% were 65 years of age or older. The gender makeup of the city was 50.8% male and 49.2% female.

=== 2000 census ===
As of the census of 2000, there were 437 people, 169 households, and 117 families living in the city. The population density was 803.8 inhabitants per square mile (310.3/km^{2}). There were 198 housing units at an average density of 364.2 per square mile (140.6/km^{2}). The racial makeup of the city was 97.71% White, 0.23% Native American, 0.46% Asian, and 1.60% from two or more races. Hispanic or Latino of any race were 0.92% of the population.

There were 169 households, out of which 34.3% had children under the age of 18 living with them, 55.0% were married couples living together, 11.2% had a female householder with no husband present, and 30.2% were non-families. 29.0% of all households were made up of individuals, and 11.2% had someone living alone who was 65 years of age or older. The average household size was 2.59 and the average family size was 3.19.

In the city the population was spread out, with 28.4% under the age of 18, 10.5% from 18 to 24, 27.0% from 25 to 44, 23.1% from 45 to 64, and 11.0% who were 65 years of age or older. The median age was 34 years. For every 100 females there were 97.7 males. For every 100 females age 18 and over, there were 104.6 males.

The median income for a household in the city was $26,250, and the median income for a family was $30,156. Males had a median income of $25,833 versus $15,909 for females. The per capita income for the city was $11,819. About 19.5% of families and 23.3% of the population were below the poverty line, including 44.4% of those under age 18 and 8.5% of those age 65 or over.

== History ==
Irondale was laid out in 1857 by John G. Scott, who built an iron furnace there. The town briefly changed its name to Savoy in 1906 to solve the problem of mail getting mixed up with the nearby towns of Ironton and Iron Mountain. A few years later the name was changed back to Irondale.

== Camp Irondale ==
Irondale once had a Boy Scout camp, called Irondale Scout Reservation. It was opened in 1920, closed and was replaced by the S-F Scout Ranch in August 1965.

== Notable people ==
- Thomas Wesley Benoist, aviator, aircraft designer and manufacturer; founder of the world's first scheduled airline
- The Iron Mountain Baby, William Moses Gould Helms, subject of folksong, was discovered where the railroad trestle crosses Big River in August 1902
- Ferlin Husky, country singer and musician, spent his early childhood on a farm outside Irondale and attended grade school at Irondale
