= List of census-designated places in Missouri =

Map of the United States with Missouri highlighted

This article lists census-designated places (CDPs) in the U.S. state of Missouri. As of 2020, there were a total of 131 census-designated places in Missouri.

== Census-designated places ==
City	County	2020 Census Pop.	2021 Pop. Est.	Main Zip Code
Affton	St. Louis	20417	18925	63123
Ashley	Pike	94	69	63334
Aurora Springs	Miller	138	159	65026
Avalon	Livingston	83	48	64643
Barnhart	Jefferson	5832	6506	63012
Bennett Springs	Dallas, Laclede	138	109	65536
Bent Tree Harbor	Benton	283	233	65355
Biehle	Perry	47	37	63775
Big Spring	Montgomery	149	207	63363
Blanchard	Atchison	27	31	64498
Blue Summit	Jackson	658	586	64063
Brewer	Perry	361	467	63775
Briarwood Estates	Jefferson	347	317	65037
Broseley	Butler	163	121	63962
Buell	Montgomery	25	-	63361
Burfordville	Cape Girardeau	87	178	63739
Burgess	Barton	54	19	64769
Castle Point	St. Louis	2815	2989	63136
Cedar Hill	Jefferson	1875	1761	63016
Cherokee Pass	Madison	271	274	63645
Chesapeake	Lawrence	48	-	65712
Climax Springs	Camden	118	200	65324
Conception	Nodaway	111	283	64433
Concord	St. Louis	17668	18760	63128
Connelsville	Adair	53	144	63559
Danville	Montgomery	28	-	63361
Dawn	Livingston	100	69	64638
Deering	Pemiscot	61	75	63827
Defiance	St. Charles	159	51	63341
Denton	Pemiscot	82	155	63877
Doe Run	St. Francois	737	787	63637
Dutchtown	Cape Girardeau	163	235	63745
Eagle Rock	Barry	193	68	65641
Edinburg	Grundy	84	80	63555
Eugene	Cole	140	-	65032
Excello	Macon	61	24	65247
Fairdealing	Butler, Ripley	543	-	63939
Faucett	Buchanan	248	173	64448
Fort Leonard Wood	Pulaski	15959	15629	65473
Fortuna	Moniteau	130	123	65034
Frankclay	St. Francois	194	179	63601
Fremont	Carter	43	-	63941
Frisbee	Dunklin	107	86	63852
Glasgow Village	St. Louis	4584	5036	63137
Golden	Barry	275	310	65658
Goose Creek Lake	St. Francois, Ste. Genevieve	524	666	63036
Gray Summit	Franklin	3055	2257	63039
Grayhawk	Ste. Genevieve	488	713	63670
Grayridge	Stoddard	87	173	63850
Grayson	Clinton	61	127	64492
Grovespring	Wright	187	72	65662
Hartwell	Henry	15	67	64788
Harviell	Butler	98	-	63945
Hayward	Pemiscot	93	72	63873
High Ridge	Jefferson	4242	4201	63049
Hollywood	Dunklin	24	23	63821
Horine	Jefferson	657	911	63070
Hunter	Carter	95	94	63943
Iantha	Barton	95	45	64759
Imperial	Jefferson	4407	5119	63052
Indian Lake	Crawford	689	1058	65453
Irwin	Barton	47	19	64759
Kissee Mills	Taney	1023	1079	65680
Knob Lick	St. Francois	147	22	63651
La Tour	Johnson	167	163	64747
LaBarque Creek	Jefferson	1658	1016	63069
Lake Arrowhead	Clinton	363	190	64465
Lake St. Clair	Franklin	825	-	63077
Lake Timberline	St. Francois	726	500	63628
Lake Viking	Daviess	486	407	64640
Latham	Moniteau	69	70	65050
Leisure Lake	Grundy	166	198	64683
Lemay	St. Louis	17117	16312	63125
Lithium	Perry	92	56	63775
Macks Creek	Camden	365	369	65786
Medill	Clark	82	308	63445
Mehlville	St. Louis	28955	28672	63125
Middle Grove	Monroe	57	46	65263
Millersville	Cape Girardeau	240	433	63766
Mine La Motte	Madison	364	239	63645
Montier	Shannon	49	99	65546
Montreal	Camden	119	61	65591
Murphy	Jefferson	8425	8241	63026
New Hamburg	Scott	218	180	63736
New Market	Platte	88	67	64439
New Wells	Cape Girardeau	40	44	63732
Oakville	St. Louis	36301	35357	63129
Old Jamestown	St. Louis	19790	20382	63033
Oxly	Ripley	62	97	63955
Ozora	Ste. Genevieve	182	217	63673
Paradise	Clay	75	-	64089
Perkins	Scott	123	281	63371
Philadelphia	Marion	206	321	63463
Plevna	Knox	7	5	63464
Pomona	Howell	440	251	65789
Pontiac	Ozark	123	102	65729
Prairie Hill	Chariton	50	48	65281
Quitman	Nodaway	42	14	64478
Raintree Plantation	Jefferson	1996	1780	63050
Ravanna	Mercer	60	133	64673
Rayville	Ray	157	332	64084
Rocky Comfort	McDonald	176	124	64861
Sappington	St. Louis	7995	7119	63126
Saverton	Ralls	213	98	63467
Shakertowne	Perry	625	617	63775
Shawneetown	Cape Girardeau	132	259	63755
Shell Knob	Barry, Stone	1254	1579	65747
South Fork	Howell	212	27	65775
Spanish Lake	St. Louis	18413	17721	63138
Spokane	Christian	491	203	65754
St. Catharine	Linn	78	61	64628
St. Clement	Pike	76	86	63334
St. Francisville	Clark	137	271	63472
St. George	St. Louis	1553	2046	63123
Stanton	Franklin	366	244	63079
Summer Set	Jefferson	1127	1178	63020
Sundown	Ozark	62	93	65761
Tarsney Lakes	Jackson	250	208	64075
Tebbetts	Callaway	64	435	65080
Terre du Lac	St. Francois, Washington	2478	2516	63628
Thomasville	Oregon	23	-	65438
Vibbard	Ray	215	278	64062
Villa Ridge	Franklin	2601	3177	63089
Wasola	Ozark	115	79	65773
Weingarten	Ste. Genevieve	127	164	63670
White Branch	Benton	301	226	65355
Whiteman AFB	Johnson	2896	4227	65305
White Oak	Dunklin	101	150	63880
Whiting	Mississippi	155	164	63845
Williamstown	Lewis	60	41	63473
Winigan	Sullivan	37	12	63566
Wortham	St. Francois	197	125	63601
Zalma	Bollinger	73	66	63787

== See also ==
- List of municipalities in Missouri
