= Mississippi River and Bonne Terre Railway =

Coordinates: 37°55′7″N 90°32′56″W

Riverside–Doe Run
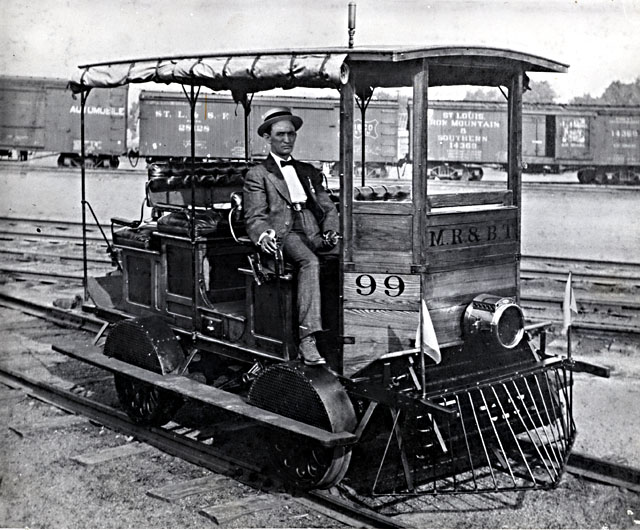
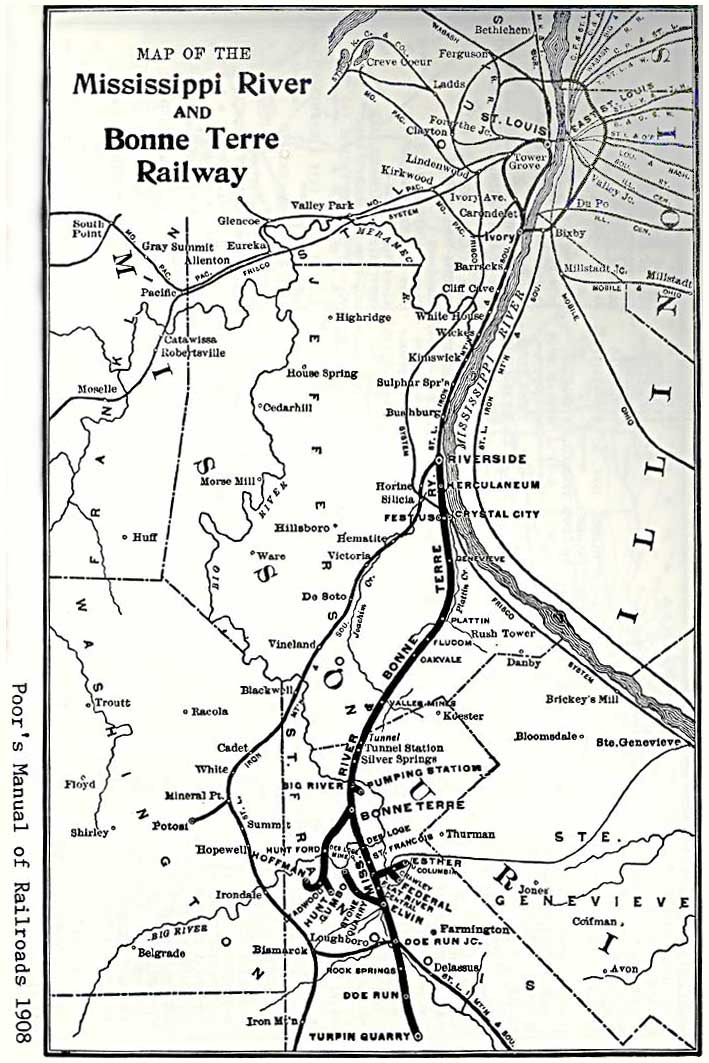
- T.V. Young, the Superintendent of the M.R. & B.T. in a track inspection vehicle Map of 1908 showing the main line and connections of the M.R.& B.T., built to serve lead mines in southeastern Missouri

Technical
- Line length: 94.574 miles (152.202 km)
- Track gauge: Initially 3 ft (914 mm), then 4 ft 8 1/2 in (1,435 mm)
- Minimum radius: 717 feet (218.5 m)
- Maximum incline: 1.8 %

The Mississippi River & Bonne Terre Railway (M.R. & B.T.) was a single-track standard-gauge steam railroad that was located in southeastern Missouri and began service in 1892. It extended from Riverside in a general southwesterly direction to the lead-mining field in St. Francois County. The main stem, from Riverside to Doe Run, was 46.492 miles (74.822 km) long. Eight short branch lines had a total trackage of 17.418 miles (28.032 km). Sidings and spurs aggregated 30.664 miles (49.349 km), and all tracks owned 94.574 miles (152.202 km).

== Corporate history ==
=== Predecessors ===
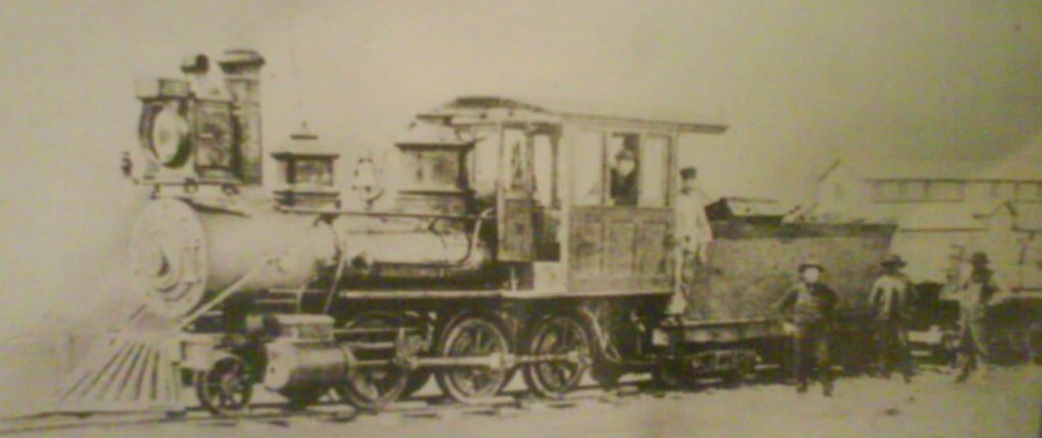
No 1 narrow gauge engine, which ran from Bonne Terre to Summit from 1880 to 1890

The minerals and supplies of the St. Joseph Lead Co., which operated one of the world-leading lead mines, were transported until 1880 on animal-drawn wagons between the mines and the St. Louis and Iron Mountain Railway. In 1880 the St. Joseph Lead Company laid the track a 10 miles (16 km) long narrow gauge railroad with a gauge of 3 feet (910 mm). It was inaugurated on 18 January 1880 and became known as the St. Joseph & Des Loge Railway. It was used to transport goods westerly from Bonne Terre to Summit, a point on the line of the St. Louis, Iron Mountain & Southern Railway Company, but the mine products of the St. Joseph Lead Company had still to be hauled for 18 miles (29 km) by ox-team from the mines to Bonne Terre. The narrow-gauge line was apparently jointly owned by the St. Joseph Lead Company and the Desloge Company. It was removed after the M.R. & B.T.'s property was placed in service. The cost was split between both companies: The St. Joe paid 66% and the Desloge Company paid 33%. The St. Joe Lead Company acquired in 1887 the assets of the Desloge Lead Company, and tried to find a shorter route, to reduce the transportation cost.

=== M.R. & B.T. ===
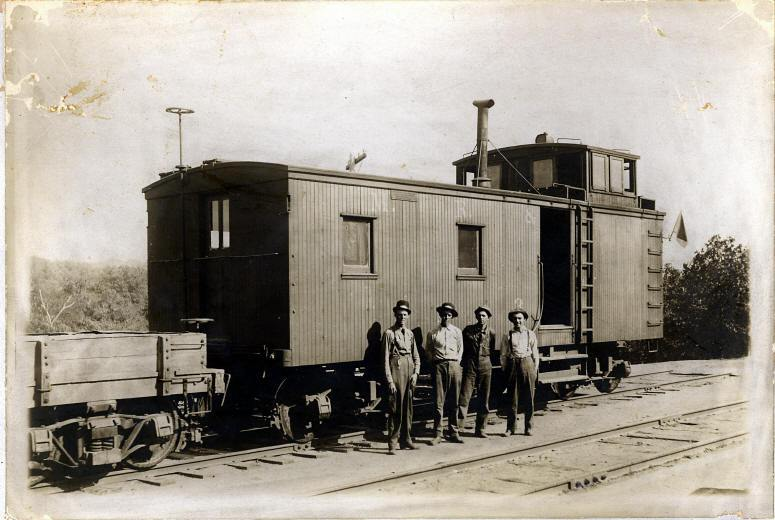
M.R. & B.T. Caboose No 3

The M.R. & B.T. was incorporated for a term of 50 years on May 11, 1888, under the provisions of Chapter 21, Articles 1 and 2, of the revised statutes of Missouri. The incorporators were nominees of the St. Joseph Lead Company. The avowed purpose of the corporation was to construct, operate, and maintain a standard or broad gauge railroad, extending in a northerly direction from Bonne Terre, St. Francois County, through St. Francois and Jefferson Counties, in Missouri, to a point on the Mississippi River now known as Riverside. The proposed line was 30 miles (48 km) long, and the authorized capital stock had the value of $10,000 per mile, or $300,000.

The railway was initially constructed as a narrow gauge railroad between Bonne Terre and Riverside, a wharf at the Mississippi River. The first section was inaugurated in 1890 and the Summit Railroad was subsequently abandoned. In 1894 the gauge of the railroad was re-gauged to standard gauge and later the track was expanded from Bonne Terre to Doe Run. It crossed the Belmont Branch of the Iron Mountain Railway at Doe Run Junction.

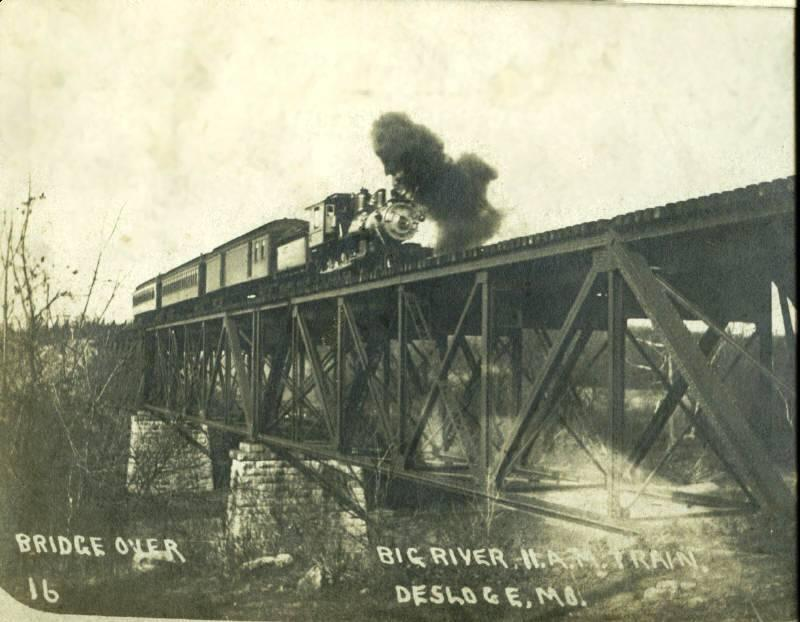
Bridge over Big River, 11 a.m. train, Desloge, Missouri

The main line of the Mississippi River and Bonne Terre Railroad was, after completion, only 46.492 miles (74.822 km) long, but it proved to be beneficial for the development of the Lead Belt, since there was a lot of traffic on the railroad. It was built similar to most trunk lines. A branch line was laid to Leadwood and there were several miles of feeders, turn-offs and sidings. The railroad ran through the growing towns of Bonne Terre, Desloge, St. Francois, Flat River, Rivermines, Elvins and Doe Run, whose economy benefited from the improved transport capabilities.

The inclines were below 1.8% and the curves had radii of 717 feet (218.5 m). The rail weights ranged between 75 and 90 lb/yard (37.5–45 kg/metre) similar to most trunk lines. Even so, the order for two Baldwin 4-6-2 Pacific locomotives included the following caution: "Engine frames to be extra heavy throughout. Engine frames to be designed to withstand rough usage and considerable lateral thrust, which will be continually in evidence given that the road is all curves, there being only one tangent [straight track] which is a mile long."

The following amendments to the original charter have been filed:

- On May 1, 1891, to change the style of construction of the road from standard to narrow gauge, and on November 4, 1893, to change it back from narrow to standard gauge.
- On May 1, 1891, to extend the line from its then southern terminus at Bonne Terre Depot in Bonne Terre to Doe Run, about 18 miles (29 km), and on June 21, 1895, to make a further extension of about 12.5 miles (20.1 km), southerly from Doe Run to a point in Madison County, Mo..
- On May 1, 1891, to increase the authorized capital stock to $500,000; on June 21, 1895, to $600,000; on September 14, 1903, to $2,500,000; and on August 3, 1911, to $3,000,000, which is the amount of capital stock authorized on June 30, 1914, the date of an ICC valuation.

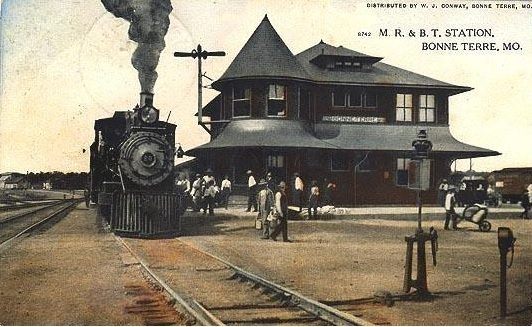
M.R. & B.T. Station, Bonne Terre, MO

The M.R.& B.T.'s main line from Riverside to Bonne Terre, 29.246 miles (47.067 km), was constructed for it by the St. Joseph Lead Company during 1889 and 1890. It was placed in regular service on March 10, 1890. The extension of the main line from Bonne Terre to Doe Run Junction, 13.898 miles (22.367 km), was also built by the St. Joseph Lead Company for the M.R. & B.T. It was placed in service in June, 1892. The southerly end of the main stem, extending from Doe Run Junction to Doe Run, 2.348 miles (3.779 km), was built, during 1892, by the Doe Run Lead Company, a subsidiary of the St. Joseph Lead Company. It was operated by the M.R. & B.T. under lease until September, 1893, when it was purchased outright. The foregoing 46.492 miles (74.822 km) of line were originally built as narrow gauge, but was changed to standard gauge in 1893–1894.

The four branch lines, embracing 17.418 miles (28.032 km), were constructed as standard gauge as follows:

- Turpin branch, Doe Run to Turpin, was built by the M.R. & B.T. in 1895-6: 3.007 miles (4.839 km)
- Hoffman branch, Hoffman Junction to Big River, 3.180 miles (5.118 km), was built by the M.R. & B.T. in 1899, and extension from Big River to end of track, 3.605 miles (5.802 km), built by the M.R. & B.T. in 1902: 6.785 miles (10.919 km)
- Gumbo branch, from River Mines to Mitchell Junction, 3.289 miles (5.293 km), was built by the St. Joseph Lead Company in 1898 and was purchased by the M.R. & B.T. in 1901; the extension from Mitchell Junction to the end of track, 1.326 miles (2.134 km), was built by the M.R. & B.T. in 1906 4.615 miles (7.427 km)
- Crawley branch, from Flat River to milepost 1.03 miles (1.66 km), was constructed by the St. Joseph Lead Company in 1893 and was purchased by the M.R. & B.T. in 1901; from milepost 1.03 to Columbia Mill, 0.731 mile was constructed by the Doe Run Lead Company in 1900–1901 and was acquired by the M.R. & B.T. in 1908. The extension of 1.250 miles (2.012 km) from Columbia Mill to end of track was built by the Columbia Lead Company in 1897, and was acquired by the M.R. & B.T. from the Doe Run Lead Company in 1908: 3.011 miles (4.846 km)

=== Aftermath ===
The Missouri Pacific acquired the M.R. & B.T. in 1929 and merged it with the Missouri-Illinois Railroad, which operated it as an independent subsidiary until 1945. In 1938 a gasoline passenger train operated and made two round trips per day. The Missouri Pacific Railway subsequently acquired 51% of the Missouri–Illinois Railroad, with which it merged in 1978.

The 11-mile-long (18 km) section from Derby at the junction with the Missouri-Illinois Railway to Doe Run ceased operations in 1941. The 22-mile-long (35 km) section from Howe to Bonne including the tunnel were disused in 1969. The two 8-mile-long (13 km) sections up north and south of Bonne Terre were still in use in the late 1980s.

== Rolling stock ==
- 21 steam locomotives
- 1172 goods wagons
- 15 passenger carriages
- 10 pieces of work equipment

== See also ==
- Desloge family
- Bonne Terre Mine
- St. Joe Lead Company Administration Building
