= Bee Run (Missouri) =

Stream in St. Francois County, Missouri

Coordinates: 37°58′00″N 90°33′32″W

Bee Run is a stream in northern St. Francois County in the U.S. state of Missouri. It is a tributary of the Big River.

The stream headwaters arise on a hillside adjacent to an old railroad tunnel at . The stream flows southwest generally parallel to and northwest of Missouri Route 67 past the community of Silver Springs and the Lake Timberline area to its confluence with the Big River about three miles north of Bonne Terre at .

Bee Run was so named on account of honeybees near its course.

== See also ==
- List of rivers of Missouri
