= Indian Creek (St. Francis River tributary) =

Stream in the U.S. state of Missouri

Indian Creek is a stream in St. Francois County in the U.S. state of Missouri. It is a tributary of the St. Francis River.

The stream begins at the confluence of Middlebrook Creek and Mud Creek at 37°40′46″N 90°37′02″W. The stream flows north and is impounded as Iron Mountain Lake within the Iron Mountain Lake community. The stream continues to the north-northeast passing under Missouri Route W on to its confluence with the St. Francis River about 3.5 miles southeast of Bismarck at 37°44′34″N 90°35′19″W.

Indian Creek was so named on account of a nearby Indian village.

== See also ==
- List of rivers of Missouri
