= Middlebrook Creek =

Stream in the US state of Missouri

Coordinates: 37°40′46″N 90°37′02″W

Middlebrook Creek is a stream in Iron and St. Francois counties in the U.S. state of Missouri.

Middlebrook Creek merges with Mud Creek to form the headwaters of Indian Creek. The confluence is just south of the Iron Mountain Lake community and reservoir.

Middlebrook Creek was named after the nearby community of the same name.

== See also ==
- List of rivers of Missouri
