= Mud Creek (St. Francois County, Missouri) =

Stream in the US state of Missouri

Coordinates: 37°40′46″N 90°37′02″W

Mud Creek is a stream in St. Francois County in the U.S. state of Missouri.

Mud Creek merges with Middlebrook Creek to form the headwaters of Indian Creek. The confluence is just south of the Iron Mountain Lake community and reservoir.

Mud Creek was so named on account of the muddy character of its water.

== See also ==
- List of rivers of Missouri
