= Tetley Hill =

Hill in Missouri, U.S.

Coordinates: 37°42′47″N 90°25′20″W

Tetley Hill is a summit in St. Francois County in the U.S. state of Missouri. It has an elevation of 984 feet (300 m). The hill is at the southeast end of a ridge between the St. Francis River to the east and Doe Run Creek to the west. Route H passes the north and east side of the hill and route AA crosses the ridge northwest of the peak. Farmington is about four miles to the north and Doe Run is about four miles to the northwest.

Tetley Hill has the name of the original owner of the site.
