= Wortham =

Wortham may refer to:

== Places ==
- Wortham, Suffolk, United Kingdom
- Wortham, Missouri, United States
- Wortham, Texas, United States
- Wortham, Lifton, an historic manor in Devon, England

== Other uses ==
- Wortham (surname)
