= Doe Run =

Doe Run may refer to:

== Companies ==
- Doe Run Company

== Places ==
=== United States ===
- Doe Run, Maryland
- Doe Run, Missouri
- Doe Run, Pennsylvania

== See also ==
- Doe Run Creek (disambiguation)
