= Bismarck Memorial =

Bismarck Memorial may refer to:

- Bismarck Memorial (Berlin), memorial statue in Berlin
- Bismarck Memorial Airport, Airport in Bismarck, Missouri

== See also ==
- Bismarck Monument (Hamburg), memorial statue in Hamburg
- Bismarck monument, monuments of Otto von Bismarck
