= Allen Branch (Doe Run Creek tributary) =

Stream in Missouri, U.S.

Allen Branch Tributary to Doe Run Creek
- Location of Allen Branch mouth

Location
- Country: United States
- State: Missouri
- County: St. Francois

Physical characteristics
- Source: Brewers Creek divide
  - location: about 0.25 miles north of Buck Mountain
  - coordinates: 37°40′07″N 90°31′43″W
  - elevation: 1,320 ft (400 m)
- Mouth: Doe Run Creek
  - location: about 2 miles south of Doe Run, Missouri
  - coordinates: 37°43′04″N 90°29′51″W
  - elevation: 866 ft (264 m)
- Length: 4.29 mi (6.90 km)
- Basin size: 5.34 square miles (13.8 km^{2})
- Discharge
  - location: Doe Run Creek
  - average: 5.76 cu ft/s (0.163 m^{3}/s) at mouth with Doe Run Creek

Basin features
- Progression: Doe Run Creek → St. Francis River → Mississippi River → → Gulf of Mexico
- River system: St. Francis River
- Tributaries
  - left: unnamed tributaries
  - right: unnamed tributaries
- Bridges: Buck Mountain Road (x2)

Allen Branch is a stream in St. Francois County, Missouri. It is a tributary of Doe Run Creek.

Allen Branch has the name of the original owner of the site.

== Course ==
Allen Branch rises about 0.25 miles north of Buck Mountain in St. Francois County, Missouri, and then flows northeast to join Doe Run Creek about 2 miles south of Doe Run.

== Watershed ==
Allen Branch drains 5.34 square miles (13.8 km^{2}) of area, receives about 44.5 in/year of precipitation, has a wetness index of 435.49, and is about 89% forested.

== See also ==
- List of rivers of Missouri
