= Tetley (disambiguation) =

Tetley is a major worldwide tea brand.

Tetley or Tetley's may also refer to:

== People ==
=== Surname ===
- Bill Tetley (1933–2003), Canadian curler, father of Ian Tetley
- Darren Tetley (born 1993), English boxer
- Glen Tetley (1926–2007), American modern dancer and choreographer
- Harold Tetley (1907–1987), New Zealand rugby league player and coach
- Ian Tetley (born 1962), Canadian curler, son of Bill Tetley
- James Tetley (1843–1924), Anglican priest and author, Archdeacon of Bristol
- James Noel Tetley (1898–1971), British Army brigadier and member of the Tetley brewing family
- Joe Tetley (born 1995), English cricketer
- Joseph Tetley (1825–1878), English-born New Zealand politician
- Joshua Tetley (1778–1859), English founder of the Tetley's brewery
- Joy Tetley (born 1946), Anglican former Archdeacon of Worcester
- Max Tetley (1909–1997), Australian rules footballer
- Nigel Tetley (1924–1972), South African-born British sailor and Royal Navy officer, first person to circumnavigate the world solo in a trimaran
- Thomas Tetley (1856–1924), English rugby union footballer
- Walter Tetley (1915–1975), American voice actor
- William Tetley (1927–2014), Canadian lawyer and law professor

=== Given name ===
- Tetley Gant (1853–1928), Australian barrister, Tasmanian politician and chancellor
- Tetley Rowe (1861–1915), Anglican priest, Archdeacon of Rochester and Canon Residential of Rochester Cathedral

== Other uses ==
- Tetley, Lincolnshire, England, a hamlet
- Tetley Hill, Missouri, United States, a summit
- Tetley (Somerset, Virginia), United States, a historic home and farm complex on the National Register of Historic Places
- The Tetley, a contemporary art and learning centre in Leeds
- Tetley Hall, a hall of residence of the University of Leeds
- Tetley Trophy, an Auckland Rugby League individual player honour

== See also ==
- Tetley's (disambiguation)
