= Doe Run Creek =

Doe Run Creek may refer to:

- Doe Run Creek (St. Francis River), a stream in the U.S. state of Missouri
- Doe Run Creek (Webb Creek), a stream in the U.S. state of Missouri
- Doe Run Creek (Ararat River tributary), a stream in Patrick County, Virginia
