= Silver Spring =

Silver Spring or Silver Springs may refer to:

== Places ==
=== Canada ===
- Silver Springs, Calgary, a neighborhood in Alberta, Canada
- Silver Springs Public School, a school in Toronto, Ontario, Canada
- Silver Spring, Conception Harbour, Newfoundland and Labrador, Canada
- Silverspring, Saskatoon, a neighborhood in Saskatchewan

=== United States ===
==== Florida ====
- Silver Springs (attraction), a group of artesian springs in Marion County
- Silver Springs, Florida, an unincorporated community in Marion County
- Silver Springs Shores, Florida, a census-designated place in Marion County
- Silver Springs State Park, a Florida State Park which includes the attraction

==== Nevada ====
- Silver Springs, Nevada, in Lyon County
  - Silver Springs Airport
- Shermantown, Nevada, formerly Silver Springs, in Lander County and later White Pine County

==== Other ====
- Silver Springs, Alaska
- Silver Spring, Maryland
- Silver Springs, Missouri
- Silver Springs, New York
- Silver Spring, Pennsylvania
- Silver Springs State Fish and Wildlife Area, Illinois

== Companies ==
- Silver Spring Mineral Water Company Limited
- Silver Spring Networks

== Transportation ==
- Silver Spring station (Maryland), a subway and commuter rail station
- Silver Spring station (Baltimore and Ohio Railroad), a historic train station in Maryland

== Other uses ==
- Silver Spring, a composition by William Mason (composer)
- "Silver Springs" (song), by Fleetwood Mac
- Silver Spring monkeys
