= Ron Bockenkamp =

American politician (born 1941)

Member of the Missouri House of Representatives

Personal details
- Born: January 21, 1941 (age 85) Bonne Terre, Missouri
- Party: Democratic
- Occupation: police detective

Ron Bockenkamp (born January 21, 1941, in Bonne Terre, Missouri) is an American politician who served in the Missouri House of Representatives. Between 1959 and 1964, he served in the United States Air Force. He also served as a St. Louis police detective before he was first elected to the Missouri House of Representatives in 1974. The Board of Directors of St. Francois County Joint Communications has seven members. Bockenkamp has served as the county-wide elected chairman.
