= Drew Forbes =

American football player (born 1997)

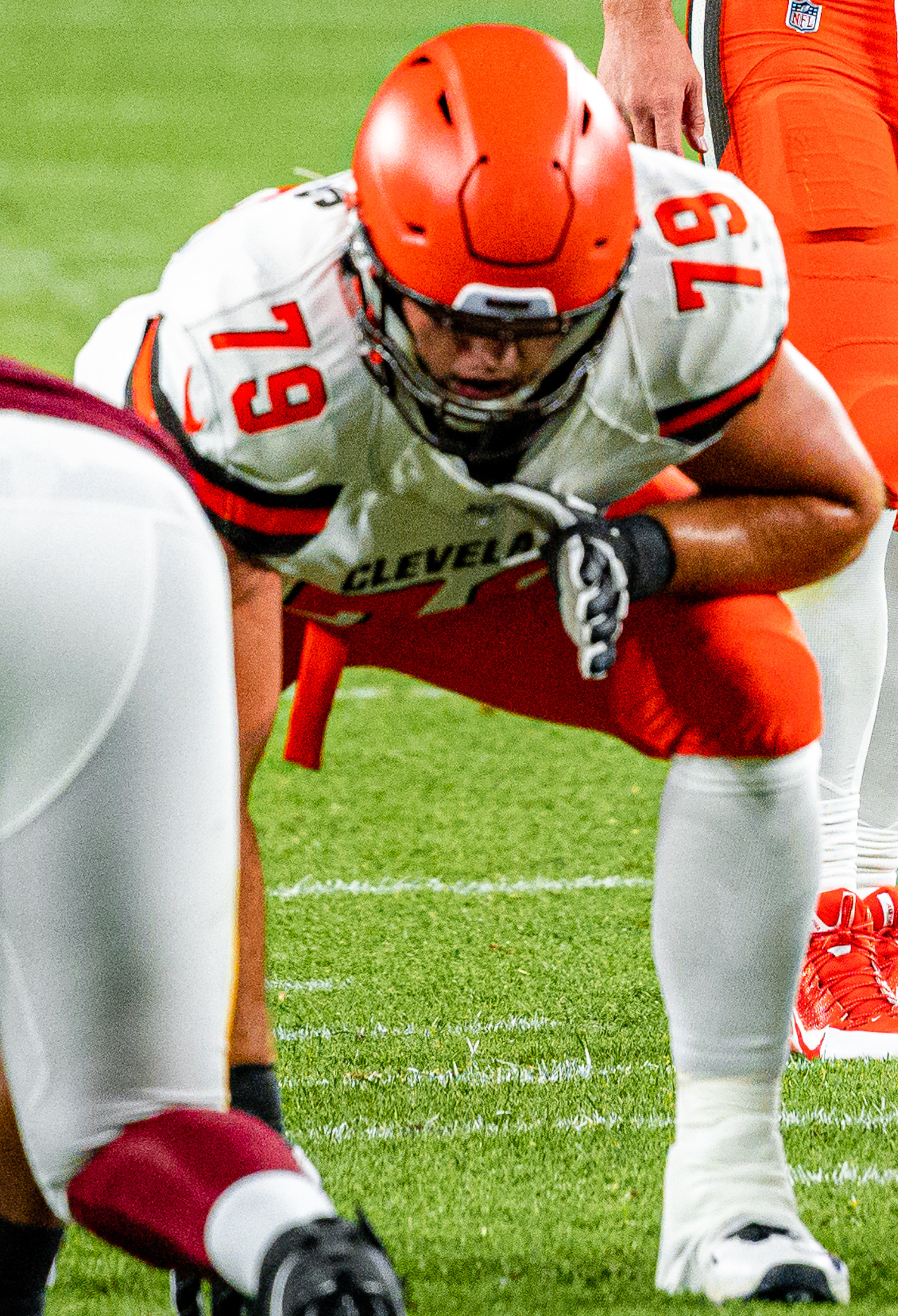
- Forbes with the Cleveland Browns in 2019

No. 79, 76, 70
- Position: Guard

Personal information
- Born: January 18, 1997 (age 29); Bonne Terre, Missouri, U.S.
- Listed height: 6 ft 5 in (1.96 m)
- Listed weight: 308 lb (140 kg)

Career information
- High school: North County (Bonne Terre)
- College: Southeast Missouri State (2015–2018)
- NFL draft: 2019: 6th round, 189th overall pick

Career history
- Cleveland Browns (2019–2021); Detroit Lions (2022); Cleveland Browns (2022–2023)

Awards and highlights
- First-team All-OVC (2018)

Career NFL statistics
- Games played: 13
- Stats at Pro Football Reference

Andrew Forbes (born January 18, 1997) is an American former professional football player who was a guard in the National Football League (NFL). He played college football for the Southeast Missouri State Redhawks.

== Professional career ==
Pre-draft measurables
Height	Weight	Arm length	Hand span	40-yard dash	10-yard split	20-yard split	20-yard shuttle	Three-cone drill	Vertical jump	Broad jump	Bench press
6 ft 4 1/2 in (1.94 m)	308 lb (140 kg)	32 5/8 in (0.83 m)	10 in (0.25 m)	4.96 s	1.73 s	2.83 s	4.70 s	7.65 s	30.5 in (0.77 m)	8 ft 11 in (2.72 m)	28 reps
All values from Pro Day

=== Cleveland Browns (first stint) ===
Forbes was selected by the Cleveland Browns in the sixth round with the 189th overall pick in of the 2019 NFL draft. Forbes signed his rookie contract with the Browns on May 2, 2019. Forbes was placed on injured reserve with a knee injury on September 1, 2019. He was activated off injured reserve on November 14, 2019.

Forbes exercised his option to opt-out of the 2020 season on July 29, 2020, due to the COVID-19 pandemic.

On August 31, 2021, Forbes was placed on season-ending injured reserve with a knee injury.

On September 5, 2022, Forbes was waived by the Browns.

=== Detroit Lions ===
On September 5, 2022, Forbes was claimed off waivers by the Detroit Lions. He was waived on October 1, 2022.

=== Cleveland Browns (second stint) ===
On October 3, 2022, Forbes was claimed off waivers by the Browns. Forbes was placed on the reserve/non-football illness list on August 28, 2023. He was waived on April 15, 2024.
