= Goose Creek Lake, Missouri =

- Census-designated place
- Location within Missouri Location within the United States
- Coordinates: 37°58′47″N 90°21′9″W
- Country: United States
- State: Missouri
- Counties: St. Francois; Ste. Genevieve
- Townships: Marion; Jackson

Area
  - Total: 4.43 sq mi (11.47 km^{2})
  - Land: 3.96 sq mi (10.25 km^{2})
  - Water: 0.47 sq mi (1.22 km^{2})
- Elevation: 760 ft (230 m)

Population (2020)
  - Total: 524
  - Density: 132.4/sq mi (51.12/km^{2})
- Time zone: UTC-6 (Central (CST))
  - Summer (DST): UTC-5 (CDT)
- ZIP Code: 63036 (French Village)
- Area code: 573
- FIPS code: 29-27924
- GNIS feature ID: 2806424

Goose Creek Lake is an unincorporated community and census-designated place (CDP) in St. Francois and Ste. Genevieve counties, Missouri, United States. The community is built around a lake of the same name, a reservoir impounding Goose Creek, an east-flowing tributary of Fourche Du Clos and part of the Establishment Creek watershed leading to the Mississippi River.

The community is in the northeast part of St. Francois County and extends east into the northwest part of Ste. Genevieve County. It is 3 miles (5 km) east of French Village, 15 miles (24 km) northeast of Bonne Terre, and 22 miles (35 km) west of Ste. Genevieve.

The community was first listed as a CDP prior to the 2020 census.

== Demographics ==
Historical population
Census	Pop.	Note	%±
2020	524		—
U.S. Decennial Census

Goose Creek Lake first appeared as a census designated place in the 2020 U.S. census.
