= Mineral City, Missouri =

Unincorporated community in the US state of Missouri

Coordinates: 37°42′59″N 90°32′01″W

Mineral City is an unincorporated community in southern St. Francois County, in the U.S. state of Missouri. The community lies on Missouri Route W, southwest of Doe Run. Stono Mountain and the headwaters of Doe Run Creek lie to the west.

Mineral City had its start as a lead-mining settlement, hence the name.
