= Bread Tray Mountain =

Mountain in Missouri, United States

Coordinates: 37°40′40″N 90°32′23″W

Bread Tray Mountain is a summit in St. Francois County in the U.S. state of Missouri. The peak has an elevation of 1,444 feet (440 m).

Bread Tray Mountain was so named on account its outline having the shape of a bread tray.
