= Bismarck Airport =

Bismarck Airport may refer to:

- Bismarck Memorial Airport in Bismarck, Missouri, United States (FAA: H57)
- Bismarck Municipal Airport in Bismarck, North Dakota, United States (FAA: BIS)
