= Allen Creek =

Allen Creek may refer to:

== Canada ==
- Allen Creek (Haliburton County), a stream in central Ontario

== United States ==
- Allen Creek (Huron River tributary), a stream in Washtenaw County, Michigan
- Allen Creek (Banister River tributary), a stream in Pittsylvania County, Virginia

== See also ==
- Allen Branch (disambiguation)
