= Rock Springs =

Rock Springs may refer to:

== Places ==
- Rock Springs, Missouri
- Rock Springs, New Mexico
- Rock Springs, Wisconsin
- Rock Springs, Wyoming
- Rock Springs–Sweetwater County Airport, Wyoming
- Rock Springs Conservation Area, Illinois
- Rock Springs Run State Reserve, Florida

== Other uses ==
- Rock Springs (film), a 2026 horror film
- Rock Springs (book), a 1987 collection of short stories by Richard Ford
- Rock Springs Cafe in Black Canyon City, Arizona
- Rock Springs massacre, an 1885 riot in Wyoming among white and Chinese immigrant miners
