= Loughboro, Missouri =

Unincorporated community in Missouri, U.S.

Coordinates: 37°46′42″N 90°31′19″W

Location of Loughboro within the state of Missouri.

Loughboro is an unincorporated community in St. Francois County, in the U.S. state of Missouri. The community is located on the St. Francis River floodplain along Missouri Route B. Elvins is approximately four miles to the north and Doe Run is about three miles to the south-southeast.

== History ==
A post office called Loughboro was established in 1870, and remained in operation until 1904. A variant spelling was "Loughborough". The community most likely takes its name from Loughborough, England.
