= Ogborn =

Ogborn is a surname. Notable people with the surname include:

- Anne Ogborn (born 1959), American activist
- Jon Ogborn, British physicist and former Professor of Science Education
- Julie Ogborn (born 1958), Guam long-distance runner
- Miles Ogborn (born 1950), British geographer

== See also ==
- Ogborn, Missouri
- Osborn (surname)
