= Big River Township, St. Francois County, Missouri =

Summit in the US state of Missouri

Coordinates: 37.9992°N 90.5656°W

Big River Township is an inactive township in St. Francois County, in the U.S. state of Missouri. It contains the census-designated place of Lake Timberline.

Big River Township was erected in 1863, taking its name from the Big River.
