= Iron Mountain, Missouri =

Unincorporated community in Missouri, U.S.

Coordinates: 37°41′43″N 90°38′25″W

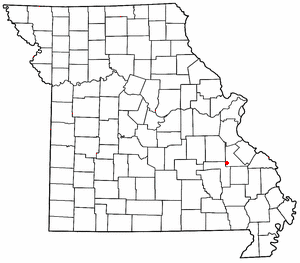

Iron Mountain is an unincorporated community in southwestern St. Francois County, Missouri, United States. It is located approximately six miles south of Bismarck.The town was needed in the civil war. because of its pure iron, it was pure enough to turn into a cannon. The community was founded in 1836 as a mining site and it was named for nearby Iron Mountain, once thought to be made completely of iron ore. A post office called Iron Mountain was established in 1846, and remained in operation until 1978.

The railroad history of the area runs deep, as the railways were key to the distribution of the minerals being mined. The Iron Mountain and Southern Railway was prominent during the development of the Iron Mountain community in the 19th century.
