= Kennedy Branch =

Stream in the U.S. state of Missouri

Coordinates: 37.764218°N 90.388178°W

Kennedy Branch is a stream in St. Francois County in the U.S. state of Missouri. It is a tributary of Wolf Creek.

Kennedy Branch has the name of the local Kennedy family.

== See also ==
- List of rivers of Missouri
