= Bonne Terre station =

- Bonne Terre Depot
- U.S. National Register of Historic Places
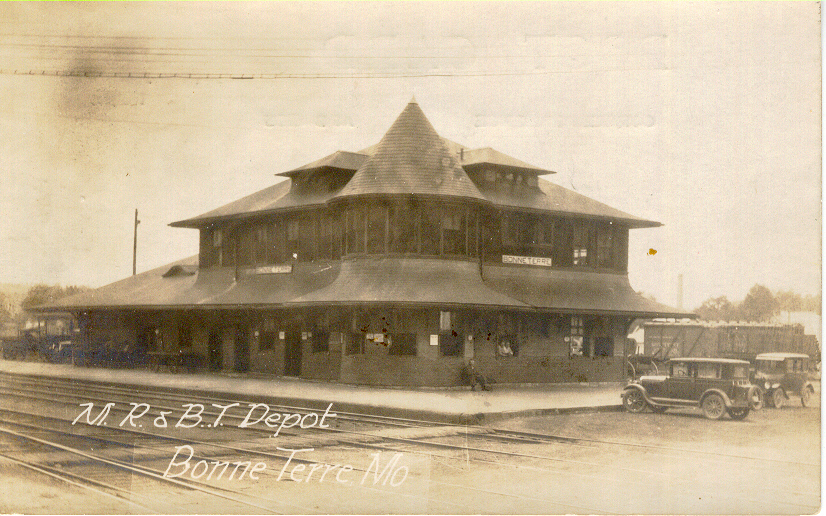
- Early photo of Mississippi River & Bonne Terre Railroad Depot at Bonne Terre, Missouri

- Location within Missouri Location within the United States
- Location: Oak St., Bonne Terre, Missouri
- Coordinates: 37°55′7″N 90°32′56″W
- Area: 0.5 acres (0.20 ha)
- Built: 1909
- Architectural style: Stick/eastlake, Queen Anne
- NRHP reference No.: 84002606
- Added to NRHP: April 5, 1984

Bonne Terre Depot, also known as the Mississippi River and Bonne Terre Railway Depot, is a historic train station located at Bonne Terre, St. Francois County, Missouri. It was built in 1909 by the Mississippi River and Bonne Terre Railway, and is a 2 1/2-story, Queen Anne / Stick style frame building on an ashlar foundation. It has a hipped roof with dormers and features a round, conical-roofed tower and encircling verandah with bell-cast profile. The building has been renovated as a bed and breakfast inn.

It was added to the National Register of Historic Places in 1984.
