= Prairie Hollow =

Valley in the US state of Missouri

Coordinates: 37.744774°N 90.353177°W

Prairie Hollow is a valley in St. Francois County in the U.S. state of Missouri.

Prairie Hollow was named for the fact the valley contained relatively few trees in pioneer days.
