= Stono Mountain =

Summit in the US state of Missouri

Coordinates: 37°43′02″N 90°32′59″W

Stono Mountain is a summit in St. Francois County in the U.S. state of Missouri. The mountain rises to an elevation of 1,644 feet (501 m). Mineral City lies along the headwaters of Doe Run Creek just to the east on Missouri Route W and Little Stono Mountain lies to the north.

Stono Mountain possibly takes its name from the Stono River in South Carolina, although folk etymology maintains stones in the area caused the name to be selected.

== See also ==
- List of mountain peaks of Missouri
