= Marion Township, St. Francois County, Missouri =

Township in St. Francois County, Missouri, U.S.

Coordinates: 37.9678°N 90.4294°W

Marion Township is an inactive township in St. Francois County, in the U.S. state of Missouri. It contains part of the census-designated place of Goose Creek Lake.

Marion Township was erected in 1836, taking its name from Francis Marion, an army officer during the American Revolutionary War.
