= North County High School (Missouri) =

Public high school in Missouri, US

Location
- 7151 Raider Road; Bonne Terre, Missouri 63628; 37°54′29″N 90°31′28″W

Information
- Type: Public high school
- Principal: Chris Brewer
- Staff: 49.75 (FTE)
- Grades: 9–12
- Enrollment: 879 (2023–2024)
- Student to teacher ratio: 17.67
- Colors: Blue and gold
- Mascot: Raider
- Website: ncsd.k12.mo.us

North County High School is a high school in the North County School District, St. Francois County, Missouri. It is located in Bonne Terre, Missouri, and is the only high school in the district.

== Notable alumni ==
- Will Compton, NFL player
- Drew Forbes, NFL player
