= Allen Branch =

Allen Branch may refer to:

- Allen Branch (Doe Run Creek tributary), a stream in Missouri
- Allen Branch (Fourche a Renault tributary), a stream in Missouri
- Allen Branch (Troublesome Creek tributary), a stream in Missouri

== See also ==
- Alan Branch, an American football player
