= Earl R. Blackwell =

Missouri Senator

Member of the Missouri Senate from the 22nd district
- In office January 7, 1959 – January 8, 1975
- Preceded by: Leo J. Rozier
- Succeeded by: Clifford W. "Jack" Gannon

Personal details
- Born: December 12, 1923 Blackwell, Missouri
- Died: December 10, 2009 (aged 85) Hillsboro, Missouri
- Party: Democratic

Earl R. Blackwell (December 12, 1923 – December 10, 2009) was an American politician who served in the Missouri Senate from the 22nd district from 1959 to 1975.

He died on December 10, 2009, in Hillsboro, Missouri at age 85.
