= Chesapeake, Missouri =

Census-designated place in Missouri, U.S.

- Census-designated place
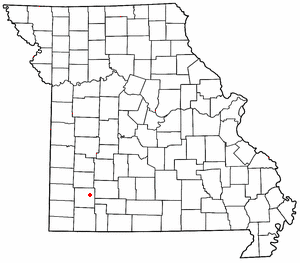
- Location of Chesapeake in Missouri
- Coordinates: 37°07′01″N 93°40′54″W
- Country: United States
- State: Missouri
- County: Lawrence

Area
  - Total: 0.45 sq mi (1.16 km^{2})
  - Land: 0.44 sq mi (1.15 km^{2})
  - Water: 0 sq mi (0.00 km^{2})

Population (2020)
  - Total: 48
  - Density: 107.8/sq mi (41.62/km^{2})
- FIPS code: 29-13582
- GNIS feature ID: 2587059

Chesapeake is a census-designated place (CDP) in Lawrence County, Missouri, United States. As of the 2020 census, Chesapeake had a population of 48. It is located on Missouri Route 174, approximately five miles (8.0 km) east of Mount Vernon.

== Description ==
Chesapeake currently houses a fish hatchery, operated by the Missouri Department of Conservation.

A post office called Chesapeake was established in 1850, and remained in operation until 1914. The community's name commemorates the Capture of USS Chesapeake.

== Demographics ==
Historical population
Census	Pop.	Note	%±
2020	48		—
U.S. Decennial Census

== See also ==
- List of census-designated places in Missouri
