= North St. Francois County R-1 School District =

School district in Missouri, U.S.

North St. Francois County R-1 School District is a school district in St. Francois County, Missouri. The district takes in students from the towns of Bonne Terre and Desloge, and from surrounding areas in the north part of the county.

== Schools ==
There are five schools in the district:

- North County Primary (grades K-2) is located at 405 Hillcrest Drive in Bonne Terre, MO.
- Parkside Elementary (grades 3–4) is located at 100 North Parkside in Desloge, MO.
- North County Intermediate School (grades 5–6) is located at 801 Elm Street in Desloge, MO.
- North County Middle School (grades 7–8) is located at 406 E. Chestnut Street in Desloge, MO.
- North County High School (grades 9–12) is located at 7151 Raider Road in Bonne Terre, MO.

There is also a career center, UniTec Career Center, which is located at 7163 Raider Road in Bonne Terre, next to the High School.

== Administration ==
The administration office is located on 300 Berry Road in Bonne Terre, near Harps Food Stores. The administrators are as follows: Mrs. Kathryn Bockman, Superintendent, Dr. Brandon Gregory, Asst. Superintendent, and Dr. Lori Lamb, Asst. Superintendent.
