= St. Joe Lead Company Administration Building =

- U.S. National Register of Historic Places
- Location within Missouri Location within the United States
- Location: Elm St. Bonne Terre, Missouri
- Coordinates: 37°55′17″N 90°32′57″W
- Area: 1 acre (0.40 ha)
- Built: 1909
- Architectural style: Gothic
- NRHP reference No.: 84002611
- Added to NRHP: April 5, 1984

St. Joe Lead Company Administration Building, also known as the St. Joe Company Offices, Central Office Building, was a historic office building located on Allen street near School street, Bonne Terre, St. Francois County, Missouri. It was built in 1909 by the St. Joe Lead Company, and was a 2 1/2-story, H-shaped, Gothic Revival style brick building with granite trim. It featured pointed arched entrances, bay windows and bi-chromatic decoration.

It was added to the National Register of Historic Places in 1984.
