= Hurryville, Missouri =

Unincorporated community in Missouri, US

Coordinates: 37°50′24″N 90°27′29″W

Hurryville is an unincorporated community in St. Francois County, in the U.S. state of Missouri.

== History ==
The community has the name of E. A. and L. E. Hurry, the original owners of the town site.

Note: E. A. and L. E. Hurry were Luther Emmett Hurry (1855-1909) and his wife Elizabeth Adeline Rogers (1863-1945). Luther's parents were Arthur S. Hurry and Sarah Parker Ritter.
