= Halifax, Missouri =

Unincorporated community in Missouri, U.S.

Coordinates: 38°00′43″N 90°29′23″W

Halifax is an unincorporated community in St. Francois County, in the U.S. state of Missouri. Key Facts Origin of Name: It was named after Halifax, Nova Scotia, in Canada. Historical Significance: A post office was established in Halifax in 1888 and remained in operation until 1925. Geographic Context: It is part of the larger St. Francois County, which is known for its rolling hills and its history as a mining hub in the "Lead Belt" region. Infrastructure: The area previously housed an AT&T Long Lines microwave relay site off Berry Road, which was a key part of the Kansas City-Oakdale communication route.

Wikipedia

+4

As an unincorporated community, it does not have its own local government and is instead administered by the county.

== History ==
A post office called Halifax was established in 1888, and remained in operation until 1925. The community was named after Halifax, Nova Scotia.
