= Mitchell, Missouri =

Unincorporated community in Missouri, U.S.

Coordinates: 37°50′48″N 90°34′47″W

Mitchell is an unincorporated community in St. Francois County, in the U.S. state of Missouri. The community lies above the headwaters of Owl Creek, approximately one mile south of Leadwood and two miles west of Elvins.

Mitchell was laid out in 1925.
