= Syenite, Missouri =

Unincorporated community in Missouri, U.S.

Coordinates: 37°40′36″N 90°23′30″W

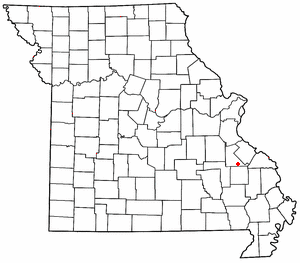

Syenite is an unincorporated community in southern St. Francois County, in the U.S. state of Missouri. The community lies on Missouri Route DD, west of U.S. Route 67. Knob Lick lies approximately 1.5 miles to the east and the St. Francis River valley is to the north and west. Knob Lick Mountain lies about one mile to the south-southeast.

== History ==
A post office called Syenite was established in 1881, and remained in operation until 1914. The community was named after the rock syenite, since the area was a mining district.
