= Fortuna, Missouri =

Census-designated place in Moniteau County, Missouri, United States

- Census-designated place
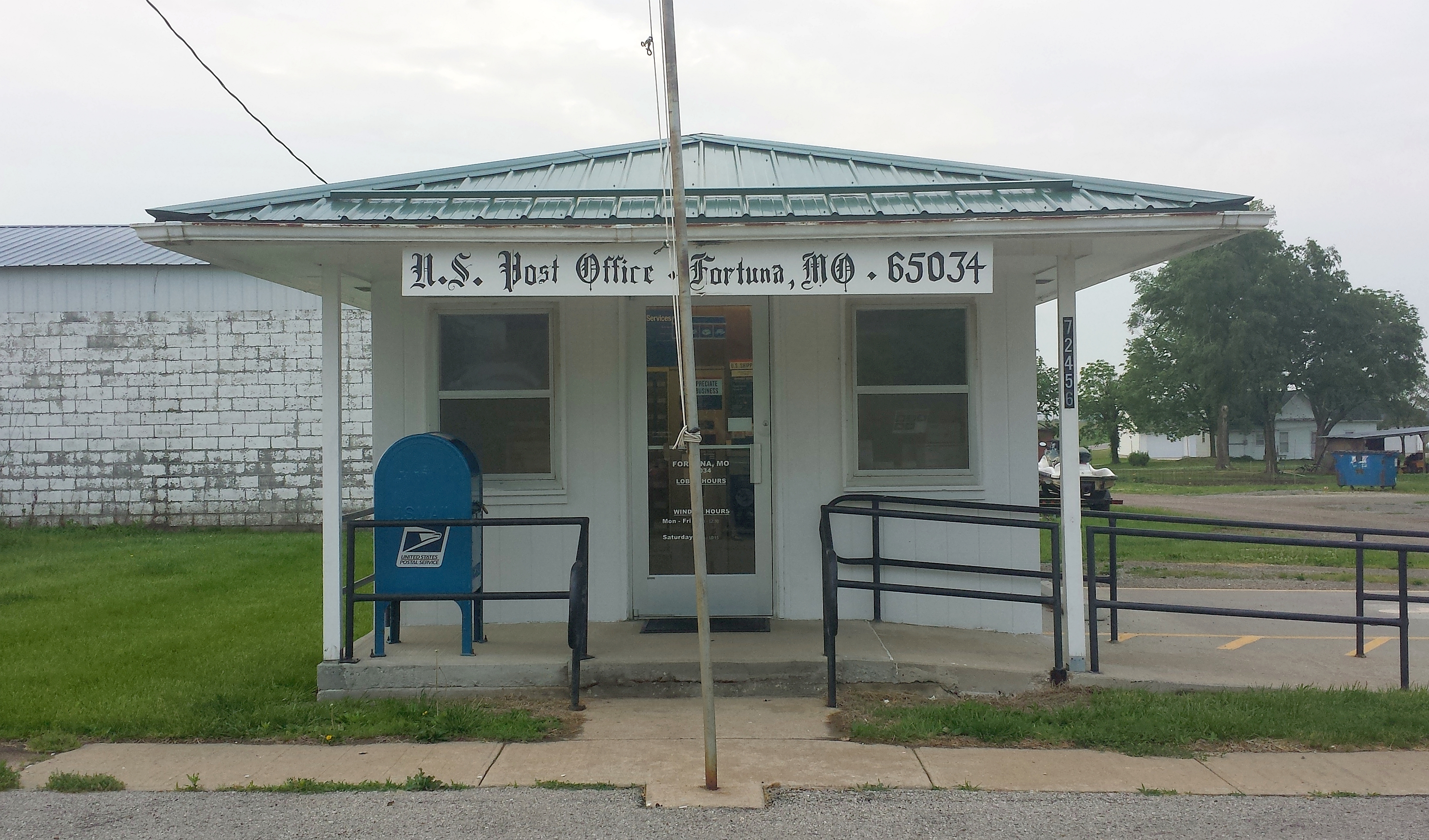
- Fortuna post office

- Location within Missouri Location within the United States
- Coordinates: 38°34′04″N 92°47′49″W
- Country: United States
- State: Missouri
- County: Moniteau

Area
  - Total: 0.20 sq mi (0.51 km^{2})
  - Land: 0.20 sq mi (0.51 km^{2})
  - Water: 0 sq mi (0.00 km^{2})
- Elevation: 968 ft (295 m)

Population (2020)
  - Total: 130
  - Density: 657.8/sq mi (253.98/km^{2})
- ZIP Code: 65034
- FIPS code: 29-25300
- GNIS feature ID: 2804681

Fortuna is a census-designated place (CDP) in Moniteau County, Missouri, United States. As of the 2020 census, the population was 130.

== History ==
A post office called Fortuna has been in operation since 1882. The community was named after Fortuna, the Roman goddess of fortune.

== Geography ==
Fortuna is in western Moniteau County and is bordered to the southwest by Morgan County. Missouri Route 5 passes through the community, leading north 6 miles (10 km) to Tipton and south 11 miles (18 km) to Versailles. California, the Moniteau county seat, is 17 miles (27 km) to the northeast.

According to the U.S. Census Bureau, the Fortuna CDP has an area of 0.20 square miles (0.52 km^{2}), all land. The town sits on a ridge which drains southeast to the Straight Fork of North Moreau Creek and northwest to Little Richland Creek. North Moreau Creek is an east-flowing tributary of the Moreau River, which joins the Missouri River near Jefferson City, while Little Richland Creek is a northwest-flowing tributary of the Lamine River, which runs north to the Missouri west of Boonville.

== Demographics ==
Historical population
Census	Pop.	Note	%±
2020	130		—
U.S. Decennial Census

Fortuna first appeared as a census designated place in the 2020 U.S. census.

== See also ==
- List of census-designated places in Missouri
