= Gads Hill, Missouri =

Gads Hill
- Unincorporated community
- Location within the state of Missouri
- Coordinates: 37°14′18″N 90°41′48″W
- Country: United States
- State: Missouri
- County: Wayne
- Elevation: 843 ft (257 m)
- Time zone: UTC-6 (Central (CST))
  - Summer (DST): UTC-5 (CDT)
- ZIP codes: 63957
- GNIS feature ID: 750014

Gads Hill is an unincorporated community in northwestern Wayne County, Missouri, United States. It is located on Missouri Route 49, approximately midway between Des Arc and Piedmont. Named after the country home of Charles Dickens, it was established in 1872 by George W. Creath. The town's name was changed to Zeitonia in 1887, but reverted to Gads Hill in 1906.

The town was a train station on the St. Louis, Iron Mountain and Southern Railway line and was the location of the Gads Hill Train Robbery, the first train robbery in Missouri, which took place on January 31, 1874. At 3:00 in the afternoon, the James-Younger gang boarded the train and proceeded to rob the passengers. While the exact amount was never certain, newspapers at the time estimated between $2,000 and $22,000 was stolen.
