= Cross Roads, St. Francois County, Missouri =

Unincorporated community in the US state of Missouri

Coordinates: 37°39′57″N 90°14′48″W

Cross Roads is an unincorporated community in St. Francois County, in the U.S. state of Missouri.

== History ==
A post office called Cross Roads was established in 1858, and remained in operation until 1862. The community was named for a road junction near the town site.
