= Bonne Terre Mine =

- U.S. National Register of Historic Places
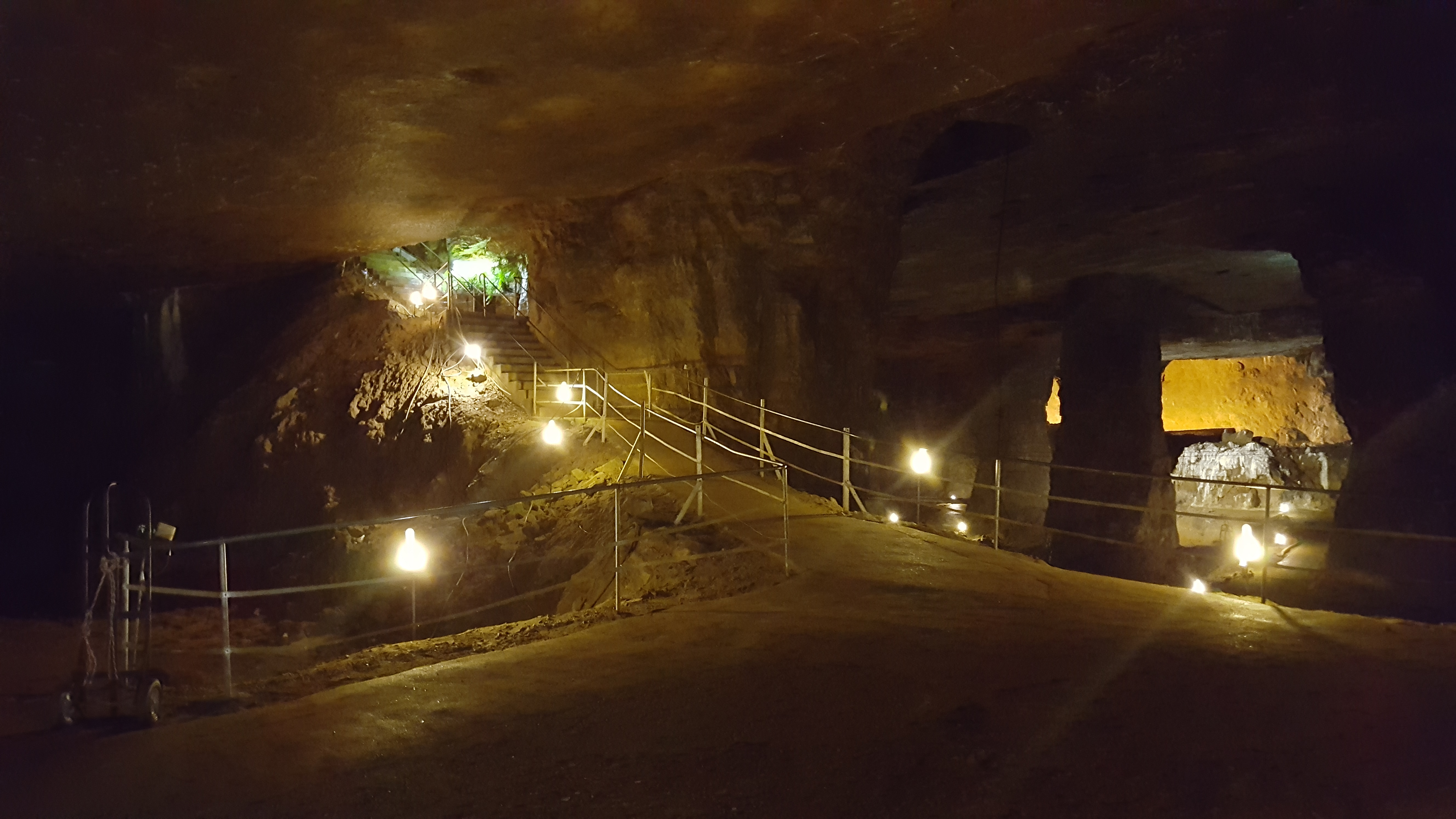
- Bonne Terre Mine in 2017

- Location within Missouri Location within the United States
- Location: MO 47, Bonne Terre, Missouri
- Coordinates: 37°55′22″N 90°33′08″W
- Area: 10.5 acres (4.2 ha)
- Built: 1864
- Built by: St. Joseph Lead Co.
- NRHP reference No.: 74002281
- Added to NRHP: September 9, 1974

Bonne Terre Mine, also known as the St. Joseph Lead Mine at Bonne Terre, is a historic lead mine located at Bonne Terre, St. Francois County, Missouri.

Bonne Terre Mine was built starting in 1864 by the St. Joe Lead Company, and is located below the city of Bonne Terre. The mine closed in 1962.

It was added to the National Register of Historic Places in 1974.

Since its closure it has gradually filled up with rain and springwater, and is called "the largest man made cavern in the world". Surface, belowground and underwater tours are possible. Surface tour features a mining museum, barbershop and post office. In 1983, Jacques Cousteau's Calypso crew explored the mine for a documentary. Since then the underwater experience has been billed as one of "Americas largest scuba diving resorts" or "the world's largest fresh water dive resort".
