= Hamilton Town, Missouri =

Unincorporated community in Missouri, U.S.

Coordinates: 37°44′29″N 90°29′01″W

Hamilton Town is an unincorporated community in St. Francois County, in the U.S. state of Missouri.

The community has the name of one Mr. Hamilton, a local minister.
