= Blackwell, Missouri =

Unincorporated community in Missouri, U.S.

Coordinates: 38.044°N 90.618°W

Blackwell is an unincorporated community in a small part of Washington County and the extreme northern section of St. Francois County, Missouri, United States. It is located approximately seven and a half miles south of De Soto.

A variant name was "Blackwell Station". A post office called Blackwells Station was established in 1858, and the name was changed to Blackwell in 1885. The community has the name of Lavinia Blackwell and Margaret Blackwell, first settlers.

Senator Earl R. Blackwell grew up near Blackwell.
