= Terre du Lac, Missouri =

Unincorporated community in Missouri, U.S.

- Census-Designated Place
- Interactive map of Terre du Lac, Missouri
- Coordinates: 37°54′11″N 90°36′57″W
- Country: United States
- State: Missouri
- County: St. Francois County

Area
  - Total: 7.56 sq mi (19.58 km^{2})
  - Land: 6.99 sq mi (18.10 km^{2})
  - Water: 0.58 sq mi (1.49 km^{2})
- Elevation: 905 ft (276 m)

Population (2020)
  - Total: 2,478
  - Density: 354.7/sq mi (136.94/km^{2})
- FIPS code: 29-72772
- GNIS feature ID: 2587116

Terre du Lac is an unincorporated community and census-designated place in St. Francois and Washington counties in the U.S. state of Missouri. It uses zip code 63628, from neighboring Bonne Terre. As of the 2020 census, Terre du Lac had a population of 2,478.

The recreational community is built around several man-made lakes and a golf course overlooking the Big River valley to the south.

== Demographics ==
Historical population
Census	Pop.	Note	%±
2020	2,478		—
U.S. Decennial Census

=== 2020 census ===
As of the 2020 census, Terre du Lac had a population of 2,478. The median age was 47.9 years. 19.7% of residents were under the age of 18 and 25.2% of residents were 65 years of age or older. For every 100 females there were 102.5 males, and for every 100 females age 18 and over there were 101.9 males age 18 and over.

0.0% of residents lived in urban areas, while 100.0% lived in rural areas.

There were 1,012 households in Terre du Lac, of which 27.3% had children under the age of 18 living in them. Of all households, 59.9% were married-couple households, 15.1% were households with a male householder and no spouse or partner present, and 18.5% were households with a female householder and no spouse or partner present. About 22.4% of all households were made up of individuals and 11.7% had someone living alone who was 65 years of age or older.

There were 1,281 housing units, of which 21.0% were vacant. The homeowner vacancy rate was 2.2% and the rental vacancy rate was 8.1%.

Racial composition as of the 2020 census
Race	Number	Percent
White	2,326	93.9%
Black or African American	7	0.3%
American Indian and Alaska Native	5	0.2%
Asian	9	0.4%
Native Hawaiian and Other Pacific Islander	0	0.0%
Some other race	15	0.6%
Two or more races	116	4.7%
Hispanic or Latino (of any race)	39	1.6%
