= Koester, Missouri =

Unincorporated community in Missouri, U.S.

Coordinates: 38°01′20″N 90°24′34″W

Koester is an unincorporated community in St. Francois County, in the U.S. state of Missouri.

== History ==
A post office called Koester was established in 1893, and remained in operation until 1917. The community has the name of C. E. Koester, the proprietor of a local mill.
