= Tetley's =

Tetley's may refer to:

- Tetley, a brand of tea
- Tetley's Bitter, a brand of beer
- Tetley's brewery, brewery in Leeds which brews the above beer
- Tetley's Stadium, Dewsbury, West Yorkshire, sponsored by Tetley's Bitter

== See also ==
- Tetley (disambiguation)
