= Lake Timberline, Missouri =

- Census-designated place
- Location within Missouri Location within the United States
- Coordinates: 37°59′45″N 90°32′44″W
- Country: United States
- State: Missouri
- County: St. Francois
- Townships: Big River

Area
  - Total: 2.57 sq mi (6.65 km^{2})
  - Land: 2.38 sq mi (6.16 km^{2})
  - Water: 0.19 sq mi (0.49 km^{2})
- Elevation: 850 ft (260 m)

Population (2020)
  - Total: 726
  - Density: 305.3/sq mi (117.87/km^{2})
- Time zone: UTC-6 (Central (CST))
  - Summer (DST): UTC-5 (CDT)
- ZIP Code: 63628 (Bonne Terre)
- Area code: 573
- FIPS code: 29-40222
- GNIS feature ID: 2806427

Lake Timberline is an unincorporated community and census-designated place (CDP) in St. Francois County, Missouri, United States. The community is built around several reservoirs constructed in the valleys of Bee Run and Primrose Creek, southwest-flowing tributaries of the Big River, which in turn flows northwest to the Meramec River.

The community is in northern St. Francois County, bordered to the north by Jefferson County. It lies northwest of U.S. Route 67, 6 miles (10 km) north of Bonne Terre, 19 miles (31 km) southwest of Festus, and 53 miles (85 km) southwest of St. Louis.

The community was first listed as a CDP prior to the 2020 census.

== Demographics ==
Historical population
Census	Pop.	Note	%±
2020	726		—
U.S. Decennial Census

Lake Timberline first appeared as a census designated place in the 2020 U.S. census.
