= Settletown, Missouri =

Unincorporated community in Missouri, U.S.

Coordinates: 37°57′02″N 90°35′45″W

Settletown is an unincorporated community in St. Francois County, in the U.S. state of Missouri.

Settletown was laid out in 1878, and named after Hattie and William Settle, the original owners of the town site.
