= French Village, Missouri =

Unincorporated community in Missouri, U.S.

Coordinates: 37°58′21″N 90°23′23″W

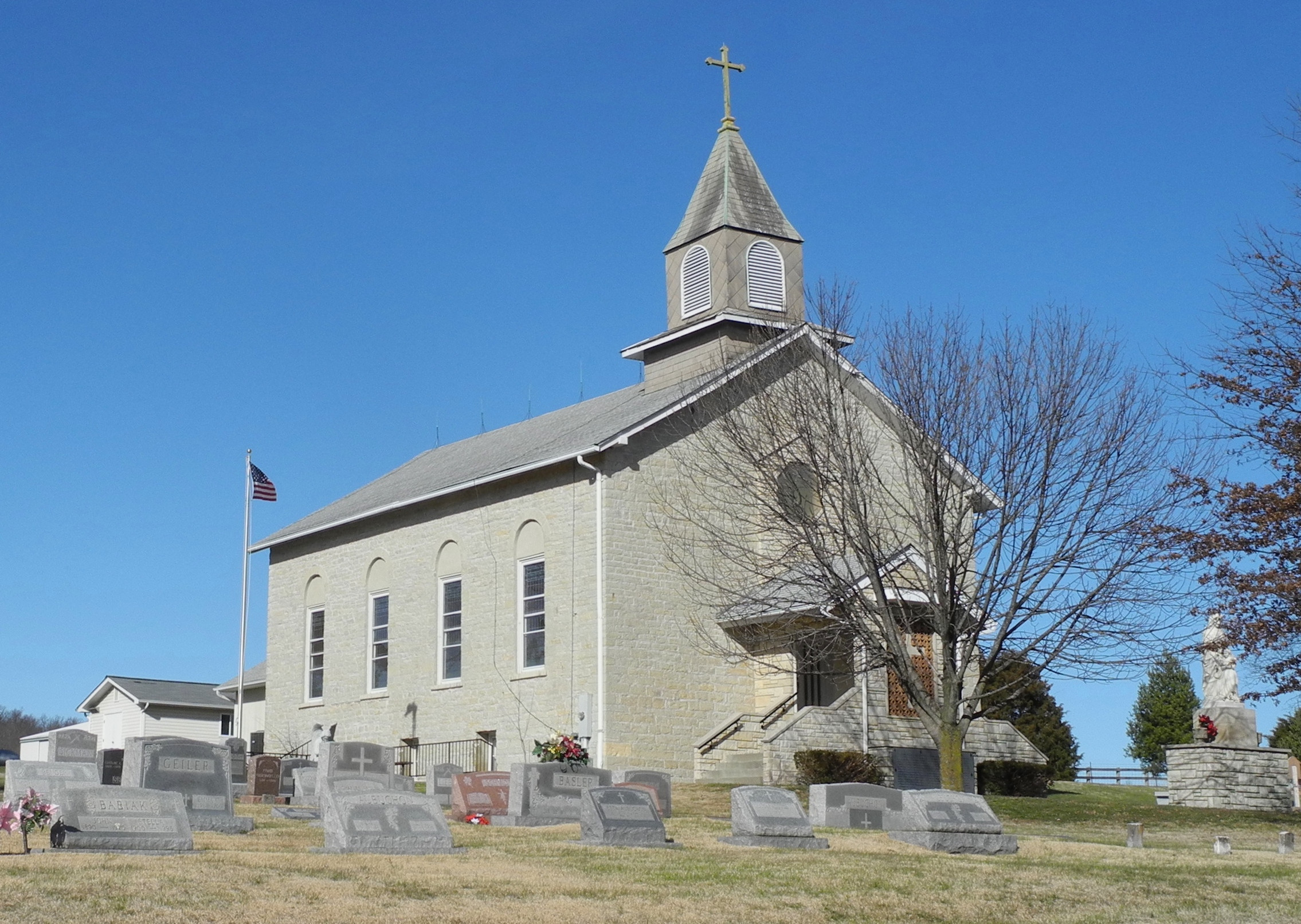
St. Anne Catholic Church in French Village

French Village is an unincorporated community in eastern St. Francois County, Missouri, United States. It is located approximately ten miles east of Bonne Terre and has a population of 1,226. The ZIP Code for French Village is 63036.

== History ==
French Village was founded in the 1820s by a colony of French Canadians. A post office called French Village has been in operation since 1857.
