= De Lassus, Missouri =

Unincorporated community in the US state of Missouri

Coordinates: 37°45′52″N 90°27′20″W

De Lassus is an unincorporated community in St. Francois County, in the U.S. state of Missouri. Much of the community has been annexed by Farmington.

== History ==
De Lassus was platted in 1869 when the railroad was extended to that point. A post office called Delassus was established in 1870, and remained in operation until 1915. The community has the name of Carlos de Hault de Lassus, a Spanish colonial official.

De Lassus can be found in the 1876 edition of The Monitor Guide to Post Offices and Railroad Stations in the United States and Canada, page 61.
