= St. Louis, Iron Mountain and Southern Railway =

American railway company

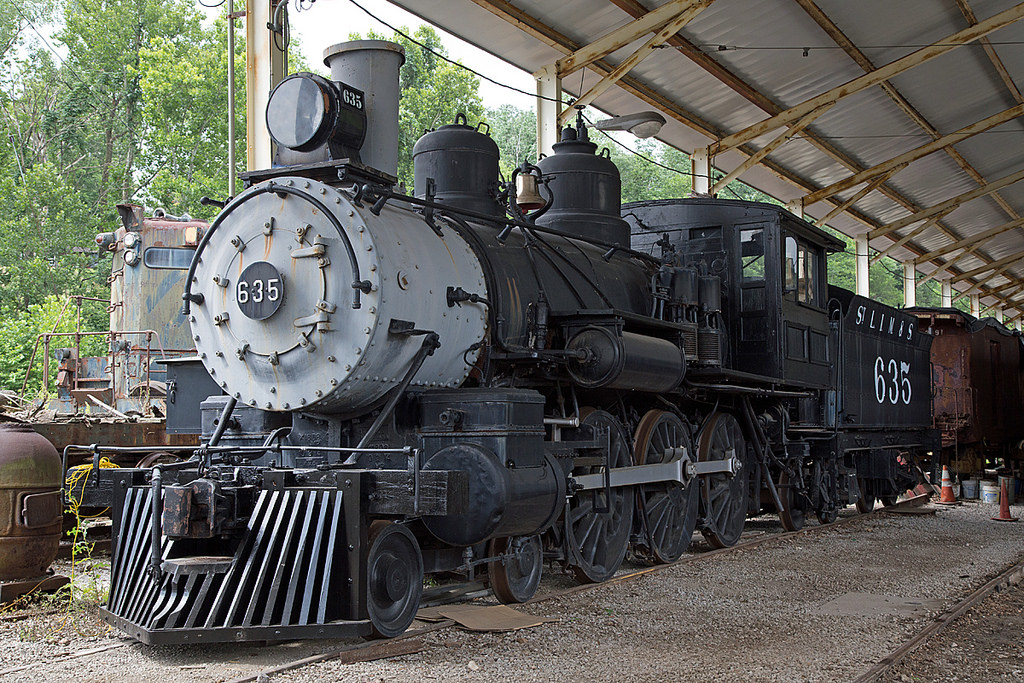
- No. 635, seen here in 2016 after preservation.

Overview
- Headquarters: St. Louis, Missouri
- Reporting mark: SLOT
- Locale: United States
- Dates of operation: 1856–1917
- Successor: Missouri Pacific Railroad

Technical
- Track gauge: 4 ft 8 1/2 in (1,435 mm) standard gauge
- Length: 489 miles (787 km)

Other
- Website: slimrr.com

The St. Louis, Iron Mountain and Southern Railway (reporting mark SLOT), commonly known as the Iron Mountain, (Note: The railway is famous for giving its name to the Iron Mountain Baby, and the railroad is reported to have paid for the child's education.) was an American railway company that operated from 1856 until 1917 when it was merged into the Missouri Pacific Railroad.

== History ==
The Iron Mountain was initially established to deliver iron ore from Iron Mountain to St. Louis, Missouri. Once owned by Henry Gudon Marquand and his brother, Frederick Marquand. They were forced out through Jay Gould's railroad monopoly. In 1883 the railway was acquired by Jay Gould, becoming part of a 9,547-mile (15,364 km) system. On May 12, 1917, the company was officially merged into the Missouri Pacific Railroad, which in turn was merged into the Union Pacific Railroad between 1982 and 1997. It was robbed twice, once by the James-Younger Gang, on January 31, 1874, at Gad's Hill, and once by the "One-Time Train Robbery Gang", on November 3, 1893, at Olyphant, Arkansas.

== Heritage railroad ==
A heritage railroad by the same name, based in Jackson, Missouri operates about 6 miles (9.7 km) of shortline in Cape Girardeau County.

== See also ==
- St. Louis, Iron Mountain and Southern Railway 5
- St. Louis Southwestern Railway
- Dardanelle and Russellville Railroad
- Mississippian Railway
- Little Rock and Fort Smith Railroad
