= Ogborn, Missouri =

Unincorporated community in Missouri, U.S.

Coordinates: 37°49′52″N 90°25′18″W

Ogborn is an unincorporated community in St. Francois County, in the U.S. state of Missouri.

Ogborn has the name of a railroad employee. A variant name was "Farmington Junction".
