= Bismarck Memorial Airport =

- IATA: none; ICAO: none; FAA LID: H57

Summary
- Airport type: Public
- Owner: City of Bismarck
- Serves: Bismarck, Missouri
- Elevation AMSL: 1,038 ft (316 m)
- Coordinates: 37°45′32″N 090°37′00″W
- Interactive map of Bismarck Memorial Airport

Runways
Direction	Length		Surface
Direction	ft	m	Surface
17/35	2,050	625	Asphalt

Statistics (2008)
- Aircraft operations: 2,910
- Based aircraft: 12
- Source: Federal Aviation Administration

Bismarck Memorial Airport (FAA LID: H57) is a city-owned public-use airport located one nautical mile (1.2 mi; 1.9 km) southeast of the central business district of Bismarck, a city in St. Francois County, Missouri, United States.

== Facilities and aircraft ==
Bismarck Memorial Airport covers an area of 56 acres (23 ha) at an elevation of 1,038 feet (316 m) above mean sea level. It has one runway designated 17/35 with an asphalt surface measuring 2,050 by 50 feet (625 by 15 m).

For the 12-month period ending April 7, 2008, the airport had 2,910 aircraft operations, an average of 242 per month: 99.7% general aviation and 0.3% military. At that time there were 12 single-engine aircraft based at this airport.

== See also ==
- List of airports in Missouri
