= Frankclay, Missouri =

- Census-Designated Place
- Location within Missouri
- Coordinates: 37°51′47″N 90°36′52″W
- Country: United States
- State: Missouri
- County: St. Francois County

Area
  - Total: 0.63 sq mi (1.64 km^{2})
  - Land: 0.63 sq mi (1.64 km^{2})
  - Water: 0 sq mi (0.00 km^{2})
- Elevation: 886 ft (270 m)

Population (2020)
  - Total: 194
  - Density: 307/sq mi (118.5/km^{2})
- ZIP code: 63601
- Area code: 573
- FIPS code: 29-25516
- GNIS feature ID: 2587070

Frankclay is an unincorporated community and census-designated place in West Central St. Francois County, Missouri, United States. It is located approximately one mile south of Route 8 about five miles west of Flat River. As of the 2020 census, Frankclay had a population of 194.

A post office called Frankclay was established in 1905, and remained in operation until 1973. The community has the name of the original owner of the town site.

== Demographics ==
Historical population
Census	Pop.	Note	%±
2020	194		—
U.S. Decennial Census
