= Gads Hill Train Robbery =

1874 train robbery in Gads Hill, Missouri

The Gads Hill Train Robbery (also known as the Great Missouri Train Robbery) was a crime committed by the James–Younger Gang in Gads Hill, Missouri. In January 1874, five members of the James–Younger gang robbed a train and stole $12,000 (equivalent to $290,000 in 2023) in cash. All five escaped.

The robbery has since been recognized as one of the most infamous crimes committed by outlaws in the American Old West.

== James-Younger gang ==
The James–Younger Gang was a gang of outlaws consisting of well-known criminal Jesse James and his brother, Frank James; Cole, Jim, John and Bob Younger, as well as other gunslingers. After fighting for the Confederate States of America in the American Civil War (1861–1865), the James brothers formed a gang in 1866 and committed crimes in Missouri, until their gang eventually collapsed in 1876 after a botched bank robbery in Minnesota.

== Previous train robbery ==
In July 1873, Jesse and Frank James robbed a train in Adair, Iowa, and stole $6,000 (equivalent to $140,000 in 2023) in cash. However, they soon ran out of money and began plotting a new train robbery. By now, the gang had acquired new members, including the three oldest Younger brothers.

== Robbery ==
On January 31, 1874, five men, believed to have been Jesse and Frank James, Cole Younger, Jim Younger and John Younger, entered the small town of Gads Hill, Missouri, and robbed the general store. Afterwards, they proceeded to hold the townspeople hostage inside the store. A train was expected to arrive there at 4:00 pm that day, but it ended up being forty-five minutes late. When it did arrive, the James-Younger gang created a bonfire on the train tracks and waved a red flag in front of it to make the train conductor stop immediately.

After entering the train, the gang proceeded with the robbery. However, they avoided robbing women and working men. It is said they did this by looking at every passenger's hands to see how much callus they had. While some of the gang members were handling the passengers, the rest broke open the safe and stole more money. All five robbers managed to escape unharmed, with a total of $12,000 (equivalent to $290,000 in 2023).

== Aftermath ==
Following one of the James-Younger gang's most successful robberies, the Pinkerton National Detective Agency began attempting to hunt down the members of the gang, particularly the ones responsible for the train robbery. In March 1874, John Younger was killed during a shootout with Jim Younger and three lawmen in Saint Clair, Missouri.
