= Rock Springs, Missouri =

Unincorporated community in Missouri, U.S.

Coordinates: 37.75644°N 90.48346°W

Rock Springs is an unincorporated community in St. Francois County, in the U.S. state of Missouri.

The area takes its name from a spring of the same name which in turn was named for its boulder. A variant name was "Rock Spring".
