= Doe Run Creek (Webb Creek tributary) =

Stream in the American state of Missouri

Doe Run Creek is a stream in Reynolds County in the U.S. state of Missouri. It is a tributary of Webb Creek.

The stream headwaters arise about three miles south of Ellington along the east side of Missouri Route 21 (at 37°11′27″N 90°57′15″W). The stream flows east and southeast to its confluence with Webb Creek (at 37°08′09″N 90°51′12″W). The confluence and final half mile of the stream course is currently under the waters of Clearwater Lake.

Doe Run Creek was so named on account of deer in the area.

== See also ==
- List of rivers of Missouri
