= Riverside, Jefferson County, Missouri =

Unincorporated community in Missouri, U.S.

Coordinates: 38°17′12″N 90°22′48″W

Riverside is an unincorporated community in Jefferson County, in the U.S. state of Missouri.

== History ==
A post office called Riverside was established in 1890, and remained in operation until 1910. The community's name alludes to the nearby Mississippi River.
