= Wortham (surname) =

Wortham is a surname. Notable people with the surname include:

- Barron Wortham (born 1969), American football player
- Cornelius Wortham (born 1982), American football player
- Gus Sessions Wortham (1891–1976), American businessman
- John Lee Wortham (1862–1924), American businessman and politician
- Michael Wortham (born 2002), American football player
- Rich Wortham (born 1953), American baseball player
- Stanton Wortham, American academic
