= Silver Springs, Missouri =

Unincorporated community in the US state of Missouri

Coordinates: 37°59′57″N 90°31′28″W

Silver Springs is an unincorporated community in St. Francois County, in the U.S. state of Missouri.

== History ==
A post office called Silver Spring was established in 1850, and remained in operation until 1860. The community took its name from a spring near the original town site.
