= Wortham, Missouri =

- Census-Designated Place
- Interactive map of Wortham, Missouri
- Coordinates: 37°50′40″N 90°36′31″W
- Country: United States
- State: Missouri
- County: St. Francois

Area
  - Total: 0.90 sq mi (2.33 km^{2})
  - Land: 0.89 sq mi (2.31 km^{2})
  - Water: 0.0077 sq mi (0.02 km^{2})
- Elevation: 889 ft (271 m)

Population (2020)
  - Total: 197
  - Density: 221.0/sq mi (85.34/km^{2})
- FIPS code: 29-81088
- GNIS feature ID: 2587125

Wortham is a census-designated place in St. Francois County, in the U.S. state of Missouri.

As of the 2020 census, Wortham had a population of 197.

== Demographics ==
Historical population
Census	Pop.	Note	%±
2020	197		—
U.S. Decennial Census

== History ==
Wortham was originally called "Cherrytown", and under the latter name was platted in 1904. A post office called Wortham was established in 1925 and remained in operation until 1969. An early postmaster, Ray Wortham, gave the community its name.
