= Bismarck, Missouri =

- City
- Motto: The Sign of a Good Town
- Location of Bismarck, Missouri
- Coordinates: 37°46′7″N 90°37′31″W
- Country: United States
- State: Missouri
- County: St. Francois
- Incorporated: 1877

Government
  - Type: Council-Manager
  - Mayor: Seth Radford
  - City Clerk: Garner Kitchen
  - Police Chief: Scott LaHay
  - Fire Chief: Kegan Gravett

Area
  - Total: 1.00 sq mi (2.58 km^{2})
  - Land: 1.00 sq mi (2.58 km^{2})
  - Water: 0 sq mi (0.00 km^{2})
- Elevation: 1,030 ft (310 m)

Population (2020)
  - Total: 1,239
  - Density: 1,244.2/sq mi (480.39/km^{2})
- Time zone: UTC-6 (Central (CST))
  - Summer (DST): UTC-5 (CDT)
- Zip code: 63624
- Area code: 573
- FIPS code: 29-05878
- GNIS feature ID: 2394176

Bismarck is a city in St. Francois County, Missouri, United States. As of the 2020 census, Bismarck had a population of 1,239.

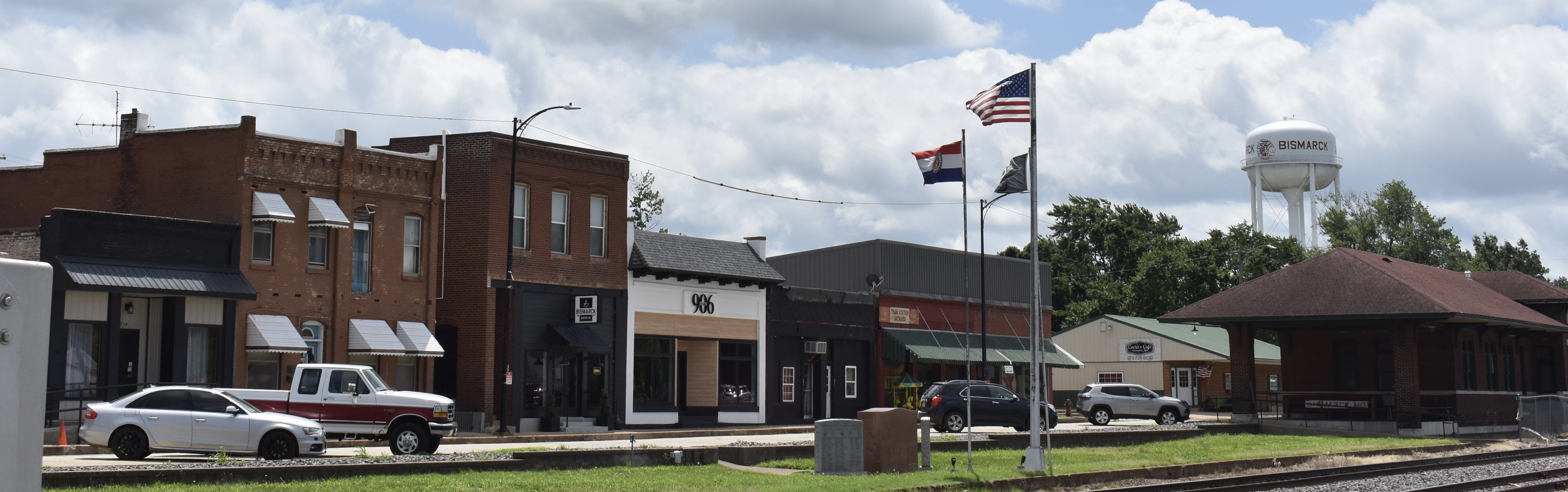
Bismarck

== History ==
Bismarck, situated in the western part of St. Francois County, owes its origin and early growth to the farming interests about it and its location at the intersection of the Belmont branch with the main line of the St. Louis, Iron Mountain and Southern Railway. Bismarck was first laid out and platted in 1868. It was named after the Iron Chancellor of Germany, Prince Otto Eduard Leopold von Bismarck, as there was a strong desire to attract German immigrants to the growing railroad area.

The railroad ran through the town from the northwest to the southeast. All of the original streets of Bismarck, with the exception of Main and Center, were named after trees.

In 1877, Bismarck was incorporated as a town by the County Court and the first trustees were William H. Gullivan, Benjamin Schoch, C. C. Grider, George H. Kelly and A. H. Tegmeyer. In the year 1881, this incorporation was abolished. Since that time, Bismarck has been reincorporated. According to folklorist Margot Ford McMillen the name of the town caused some difficult times for residents following America's entry into World War I. With patriotism running high, a town named for a famous German leader was seen as "un-American", and prompted some citizens to advocate changing the name to "Loyal". However the majority of residents soundly rejected the idea.

The population about 1910 was 848. It is now 1,579.

== Geography ==
According to the United States Census Bureau, the city has a total area of 1.00 square mile (2.59 km^{2}), all land.

== Demographics ==
Historical population
Census	Pop.	Note	%±
1880	285		—
1890	837		193.7%
1900	708		−15.4%
1910	848		19.8%
1920	949		11.9%
1930	1,185		24.9%
1940	1,302		9.9%
1950	1,244		−4.5%
1960	1,237		−0.6%
1970	1,387		12.1%
1980	1,625		17.2%
1990	1,579		−2.8%
2000	1,470		−6.9%
2010	1,546		5.2%
2020	1,239		−19.9%
U.S. Decennial Census; 2013 Estimate

=== 2010 census ===
As of the census of 2010, there were 1,546 people, 634 households, and 410 families residing in the city. The population density was 1,546.0 inhabitants per square mile (596.9/km^{2}). There were 723 housing units at an average density of 723.0 per square mile (279.2/km^{2}). The racial makeup of the city was 97.61% White, 0.26% Black or African American, 0.91% Native American, 0.06% Asian, 0.13% from other races, and 1.03% from two or more races. Hispanic or Latino of any race were 0.65% of the population.

There were 634 households, of which 34.9% had children under the age of 18 living with them, 43.8% were married couples living together, 15.1% had a female householder with no husband present, 5.7% had a male householder with no wife present, and 35.3% were non-families. 26.8% of all households were made up of individuals, and 11.7% had someone living alone who was 65 years of age or older. The average household size was 2.44 and the average family size was 2.95.

The median age in the city was 37.2 years. 24.5% of residents were under the age of 18; 8.4% were between the ages of 18 and 24; 26.9% were from 25 to 44; 26.4% were from 45 to 64; and 14% were 65 years of age or older. The gender makeup of the city was 47.3% male and 52.7% female.

=== 2000 census ===
As of the census of 2000, there were 1,470 people, 586 households, and 420 families residing in the city. The population density was 1,477.1 inhabitants per square mile (570.3/km^{2}). There were 660 housing units at an average density of 663.2 per square mile (256.1/km^{2}). The racial makeup of the city was 98.84% White, 0.20% African American, 0.20% Native American, 0.07% Asian, and 0.68% from two or more races. Hispanic or Latino of any race were 0.20% of the population.

There were 586 households, out of which 33.8% had children under the age of 18 living with them, 52.9% were married couples living together, 13.1% had a female householder with no husband present, and 28.3% were non-families. 24.1% of all households were made up of individuals, and 13.0% had someone living alone who was 65 years of age or older. The average household size was 2.43 and the average family size was 2.85.

In the city, the population was spread out, with 25.6% under the age of 18, 9.4% from 18 to 24, 29.5% from 25 to 44, 20.3% from 45 to 64, and 15.1% who were 65 years of age or older. The median age was 36 years. For every 100 females there were 95.5 males. For every 100 females age 18 and over, there were 90.4 males.

The median income for a household in the city was $24,583, and the median income for a family was $30,294. Males had a median income of $25,781 versus $18,417 for females. The per capita income for the city was $12,150. About 14.7% of families and 20.9% of the population were below the poverty line, including 29.4% of those under age 18 and 14.7% of those age 65 or over.

== Transportation ==
The Bismarck Memorial Airport is located one nautical mile (1.9 km) southeast of Bismarck's central business district.

The Missouri Pacific line from St. Louis to Laredo runs through Bismarck.

== Notable people ==
- George Washington Peck – Member of the United States House of Representatives from Michigan
- Johnny Reagan - Missouri Basketball Hall of Fame
- Glen D. VanHerck - USAF General, Commander USNORTHCOM & NORAD USAF Biography
