= Doe Run Creek (St. Francis River tributary) =

Stream in the U.S. state of Missouri

Doe Run Creek is a stream in St. Francois County in the U.S. state of Missouri. It is a tributary of the St. Francis River.

The headwaters of the stream arise just east of Stono Mountain and west of Mineral City at 37°43′15″N 90°31′39″W. The stream crosses under Missouri Route W just southwest of Doe Run and continues on to the southeast to its confluence with the St. Francis River at 37°39′51″N 90°25′55″W.

Doe Run Creek was so named on account of does in the area.

== See also ==
- List of rivers of Missouri
