= Iron Mountain Lake, Missouri =

- City
- Location of Iron Mountain Lake, Missouri
- Coordinates: 37°41′08″N 90°37′23″W
- Country: United States
- State: Missouri
- County: St. Francois

Area
  - Total: 2.08 sq mi (5.40 km^{2})
  - Land: 1.96 sq mi (5.08 km^{2})
  - Water: 0.12 sq mi (0.32 km^{2})
- Elevation: 1,053 ft (321 m)

Population (2020)
  - Total: 640
  - Density: 326.2/sq mi (125.94/km^{2})
- Time zone: UTC-6 (Central (CST))
  - Summer (DST): UTC-5 (CDT)
- Postal code: 63624
- Area code: 573
- FIPS code: 29-35450
- GNIS feature ID: 2395436
- Website: https://ironmountainlake.com/

Iron Mountain Lake is a city in St. Francois County, Missouri, United States. As of the 2020 census, Iron Mountain Lake had a population of 640.

== Geography ==
According to the United States Census Bureau, the city has a total area of 2.08 square miles (5.39 km^{2}), of which 1.96 square miles (5.08 km^{2}) is land and 0.12 square miles (0.31 km^{2}) is water.

== Demographics ==
Historical population
Census	Pop.	Note	%±
1990	632		—
2000	693		9.7%
2010	737		6.3%
2020	640		−13.2%
U.S. Decennial Census

=== 2010 census ===
As of the census of 2010, there were 737 people, 295 households, and 200 families living in the city. The population density was 376.0 inhabitants per square mile (145.2/km^{2}). There were 367 housing units at an average density of 187.2 per square mile (72.3/km^{2}). The racial makeup of the city was 96.20% White, 2.17% Native American, 0.14% Asian, 0.14% from other races, and 1.36% from two or more races. Hispanic or Latino of any race were 1.90% of the population.

There were 295 households, of which 29.2% had children under the age of 18 living with them, 45.8% were married couples living together, 13.6% had a female householder with no husband present, 8.5% had a male householder with no wife present, and 32.2% were non-families. 25.8% of all households were made up of individuals, and 11.2% had someone living alone who was 65 years of age or older. The average household size was 2.50 and the average family size was 2.95.

The median age in the city was 41.8 years. 22.7% of residents were under the age of 18; 7.7% were between the ages of 18 and 24; 24% were from 25 to 44; 29.9% were from 45 to 64; and 15.6% were 65 years of age or older. The gender makeup of the city was 48.8% male and 51.2% female.

=== 2000 census ===
As of the census of 2000, there were 693 people, 265 households, and 187 families living in the city. The population density was 351.8 inhabitants per square mile (135.8/km^{2}). There were 380 housing units at an average density of 192.9 per square mile (74.5/km^{2}). The racial makeup of the city was 98.12% White, 0.14% Native American, 0.14% Asian, and 1.59% from two or more races. Hispanic or Latino of any race were 3.32% of the population.

There were 265 households, out of which 34.0% had children under the age of 18 living with them, 53.6% were married couples living together, 10.6% had a female householder with no husband present, and 29.1% were non-families. 24.2% of all households were made up of individuals, and 11.7% had someone living alone who was 65 years of age or older. The average household size was 2.62 and the average family size was 3.03.

In the city the population was spread out, with 28.0% under the age of 18, 7.2% from 18 to 24, 26.3% from 25 to 44, 24.7% from 45 to 64, and 13.9% who were 65 years of age or older. The median age was 37 years. For every 100 females there were 92.5 males. For every 100 females age 18 and over, there were 94.2 males.

The median income for a household in the city was $19,583, and the median income for a family was $23,750. Males had a median income of $23,854 versus $17,344 for females. The per capita income for the city was $9,399. About 29.2% of families and 34.9% of the population were below the poverty line, including 46.8% of those under age 18 and 29.6% of those age 65 or over.
