= Doe Run, Missouri =

Doe Run
- Census-designated place
- Location within Missouri Location within the United States
- Coordinates: 37°44′34″N 90°29′51″W
- Country: United States
- State: Missouri
- County: St. Francois County
- Founded: 1880

Area
  - Total: 2.42 sq mi (6.26 km^{2})
  - Land: 2.41 sq mi (6.24 km^{2})
  - Water: 0.0077 sq mi (0.02 km^{2})
- Elevation: 961 ft (293 m)

Population (2020)
  - Total: 737
  - Density: 305.8/sq mi (118.06/km^{2})
- ZIP code: 63637
- Area code: 573
- FIPS code: 29-19684
- GNIS feature ID: 2587064

Doe Run is an unincorporated community and census-designated place in St. Francois County, Missouri, United States. As of the 2020 census, Doe Run had a population of 737. It is located on Routes 221 and B, approximately three miles southwest of Farmington.

== Demographics ==
Historical population
Census	Pop.	Note	%±
2020	737		—
U.S. Decennial Census

== History ==
Doe Run had its start in 1880 as a lead-mining town. A post office called Doe Run has been in operation since 1887. The community takes its name from nearby Doe Run Creek.
