= Bonne Terre, Missouri =

City in St. Francois County, Missouri, United States

- City
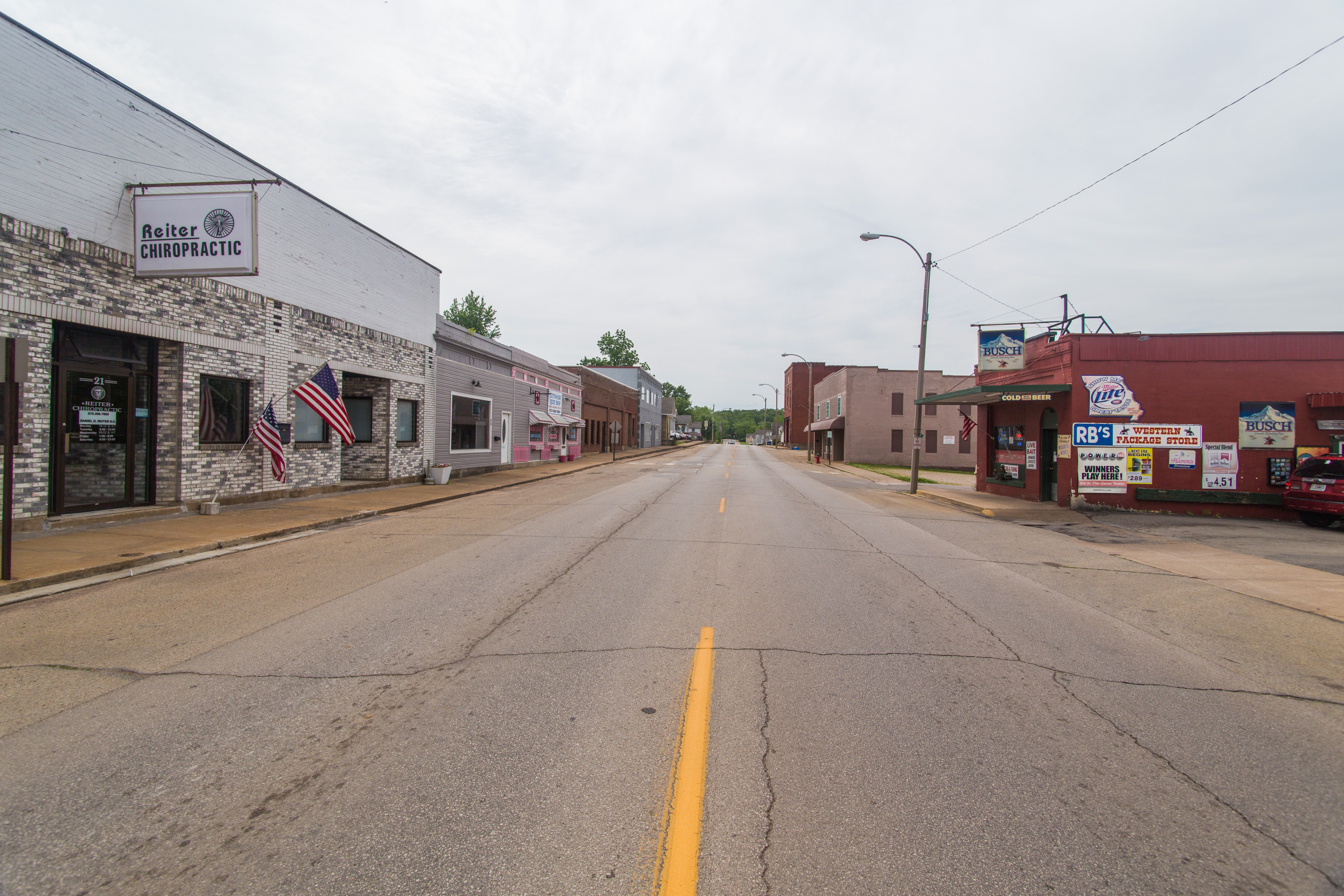
- Bonne Terre, Missouri, May 2019
- Motto: Good Earth, Good People
- Location of Bonne Terre, Missouri
- Coordinates: 37°55′15″N 90°32′33″W
- Country: United States
- State: Missouri
- County: St. Francois

Government
  - Mayor: Erik Schonhardt

Area
  - Total: 4.10 sq mi (10.63 km^{2})
  - Land: 4.07 sq mi (10.54 km^{2})
  - Water: 0.035 sq mi (0.09 km^{2})
- Elevation: 824 ft (251 m)

Population (2020)
  - Total: 6,903
  - Density: 1,696.8/sq mi (655.14/km^{2})
- Time zone: UTC−6 (Central (CST))
  - Summer (DST): UTC−5 (CDT)
- ZIP Code: 63628
- Area code: 573
- FIPS code: 29-07102
- GNIS feature ID: 2394219
- Website: City of Bonne Terre, Missouri

Bonne Terre (/bɒnˈtɛər/ bon-TAIR) is a city in St. Francois County, Missouri, United States. As of the 2020 census, Bonne Terre had a population of 6,903. Situated in the Southeast Missouri Lead District, lead mining shaped the history and character of the area from the earliest French settlers in the 1720s until today, even though Bonne Terre Mine (established by St. Joseph lead mining company in 1864) closed in 1962. Mine tailing piles eroded, and contaminated the area as dust, posing residential hazards or were washed into the Big River. Not until 1992 was the Bonne Terre Mine Tailings Site listed as a Superfund site; as of 2022 remediation is still ongoing.

The Bonne Terre Depot from 1909, the St. Joe Lead Company Administration Building and the Bonne Terre Mine, are listed on the National Register of Historic Places. The latter is spring water filled and has become a scuba diving attraction.

Bonne Terre is also home to the Eastern Reception, Diagnostic and Correctional Center, a 3000 bed prison of adult males who may have substance abuse issues or are mentally disabled, and where Missouri has conducted all of its executions since April 2005.

== History ==
=== Lead mining era, 1860s-1963 ===
The community was originally part of the Louisiana Territory and settled by Frenchmen in 1720 after they discovered lead ore. Two Frenchmen, La Motte and Philip Francois Renault, had left France in 1719 with 200 miners in search of minerals as part of the Company of the West. Surface miners referred to it as La Bonne Terre around 1825, meaning "the good soil" because of the lead. In 1828, St. Anne, the first Catholic chapel in St Francois County, was built here.

In 1864, Bonne Terre Mine was established by St. Joseph lead mining company which was incorporated in NYC the same year. In 1865, a new superintendent, J. C. Winslow, brought a number of Cornish miners. Underground mining began in 1869. After a post office was established in 1868, the corporate name of the town, "St. Joe´s mines" changed to Bonne Terre.

Major lead mining operations from the 1870s also included the Desloge Lead Company, and Doe Run. The Desloge mines were started by Firmin V. Desloge, and above-ground works were bounded approximately by present-day Division Street on the west, Benham Street on the south, Route 67 on the east, and the township line to the north.

In 1880, Bone Terre was platted as a town. The miners were local small farmers, timber cutters and rock quarrymen supplementing their income, and later Hungarian, various Slavic, and other southern European immigrants. In 1890, the Mississippi River & Bonne Terre Railroad hauled ore to Herculaneum smelters. The Bonne Terre Depot from 1909 still exists. At the beginning of the 20th century, St. Joe Lead was the only one of initially dozens of mining companies left, as it had bought up the remaining companies. In 1962, the mine closed. Lead mine tailings were used as paving gravel for decades.

In 1977, heavy rains caused about 50,000 cubic yards of tailings to slough into the Big River.

=== 21st century ===
Chat dumps or mine tailing piles remain until today; lead dust contaminated the surrounding area and was a hazard to residents. Only in 1992, the Bonne Terre Mine Tailings Site was listed as a Superfund Site. As of 2021, over 1,400 residential yards have been remediated. The Bonne Terre East Tailings Flat is still used as a repository for lead-contaminated soils. Because lead levels in fish downstream of the mining area are elevated above World Health Organization Standards, the state of Missouri advises people not to eat fish they catch from the Big River.

Bonne Terre is home to the Eastern Reception, Diagnostic and Correctional Center, a roughly 3000-bed prison of adult males who may have substance abuse issues or are mentally disabled. Since April 2005, Missouri has conducted all of its executions there.

== Geography ==
Bonne Terre is part of the Southeast Missouri Lead District, an area of rolling hills of the Ozark Plateau with elevations up to 300 feet. The ground is mostly red clay over a base of limestone. The area contains the highest concentration of galena (lead(II) sulfide) in the world.

According to the United States Census Bureau, the city has a total area of 4.10 square miles (10.62 km^{2}), of which 4.04 square miles (10.46 km^{2}) is land and 0.06 square miles (0.16 km^{2}) is water.

== Demographics ==
Historical population
Census	Pop.	Note	%±
1890	3,719		—
1920	3,815		—
1930	4,021		5.4%
1940	3,730		−7.2%
1950	3,533		−5.3%
1960	3,219		−8.9%
1970	3,622		12.5%
1980	3,797		4.8%
1990	3,871		1.9%
2000	4,039		4.3%
2010	6,864		69.9%
2020	6,903		0.6%
U.S. Decennial Census

=== 2020 census ===
As of the 2020 census, Bonne Terre had a population of 6,903. The median age was 37.2 years. 15.7% of residents were under the age of 18 and 11.9% of residents were 65 years of age or older. For every 100 females there were 190.4 males, and for every 100 females age 18 and over there were 218.0 males age 18 and over.

94.7% of residents lived in urban areas, while 5.3% lived in rural areas.

There were 1,796 households, of which 31.8% had children under the age of 18 living in them. Of all households, 38.6% were married-couple households, 19.9% were households with a male householder and no spouse or partner present, and 30.7% were households with a female householder and no spouse or partner present. About 31.1% of all households were made up of individuals and 13.2% had someone living alone who was 65 years of age or older.

There were 2,041 housing units, of which 12.0% were vacant. The homeowner vacancy rate was 3.7% and the rental vacancy rate was 13.0%.

Racial composition as of the 2020 census
Race	Number	Percent
White	5,248	76.0%
Black or African American	1,262	18.3%
American Indian and Alaska Native	27	0.4%
Asian	19	0.3%
Native Hawaiian and Other Pacific Islander	3	0.0%
Some other race	32	0.5%
Two or more races	312	4.5%
Hispanic or Latino (of any race)	119	1.7%

=== 2010 census ===
As of the census of 2010, there were 6,864 people, 1,634 households, and 1,063 families living in the city. The population density was 1,699.0 inhabitants per square mile (656.0/km^{2}). There were 1,882 housing units at an average density of 465.8 per square mile (179.8/km^{2}). The racial makeup of the city was 79.60% White, 18.72% Black or African American, 0.34% Native American, 0.20% Asian, 0.10% Native Hawaiian or Pacific Islander, 0.10% from other races, and 0.93% from two or more races. Hispanic or Latino of any race were 1.35% of the population.

There were 1,634 households, of which 38.2% had children under the age of 18 living with them, 43.9% were married couples living together, 15.9% had a female householder with no husband present, 5.3% had a male householder with no wife present, and 34.9% were non-families. 29.5% of all households were made up of individuals, and 13.1% had someone living alone who was 65 years of age or older. The average household size was 2.54 and the average family size was 3.14.

The median age in the city was 34.2 years. 17.3% of residents were under the age of 18; 12.8% were between the ages of 18 and 24; 37.1% were from 25 to 44; 22.3% were from 45 to 64; and 10.4% were 65 years of age or older. The gender makeup of the city was 67.1% male and 32.9% female.

=== 2000 census ===
As of the census of 2000, there were 4,039 people, 1,554 households, and 1,062 families living in the city. The population density was 1,000.0 inhabitants per square mile (386.1/km^{2}). There were 1,685 housing units at an average density of 417.2 per square mile (161.1/km^{2}). The racial makeup of the city was 98.46% White, 0.30% African American, 0.20% Native American, 0.05% Asian, 0.12% from other races, and 0.87% from two or more races. Hispanic or Latino of any race were 0.17% of the population.

There were 1,554 households, out of which 35.9% had children under the age of 18 living with them, 49.4% were married couples living together, 14.4% had a female householder with no husband present, and 31.6% were non-families. 27.3% of all households were made up of individuals, and 13.9% had someone living alone who was 65 years of age or older. The average household size was 2.53 and the average family size was 3.06.

In the city the population was spread out, with 27.1% under the age of 18, 10.0% from 18 to 24, 27.9% from 25 to 44, 19.3% from 45 to 64, and 15.8% who were 65 years of age or older. The median age was 35 years. For every 100 females there were 89.2 males. For every 100 females age 18 and over, there were 85.1 males.

The median income for a household in the city was $29,929, and the median income for a family was $37,072. Males had a median income of $29,617 versus $18,310 for females. The per capita income for the city was $15,062. About 11.7% of families and 15.4% of the population were below the poverty line, including 20.4% of those under age 18 and 21.8% of those age 65 or over.

== Education ==
North St. Francois County R-1 School District operates three schools at Bonne Terre: North County Primary School, North Co. Sr. High School, and Unitec Career Center.

The town has a lending library, the Bonne Terre Memorial Library. The Limestone building in the style of Italian renaissance was built in 1905 by St. Joe Lead Company director Dwight Jones.

== Arts and culture ==
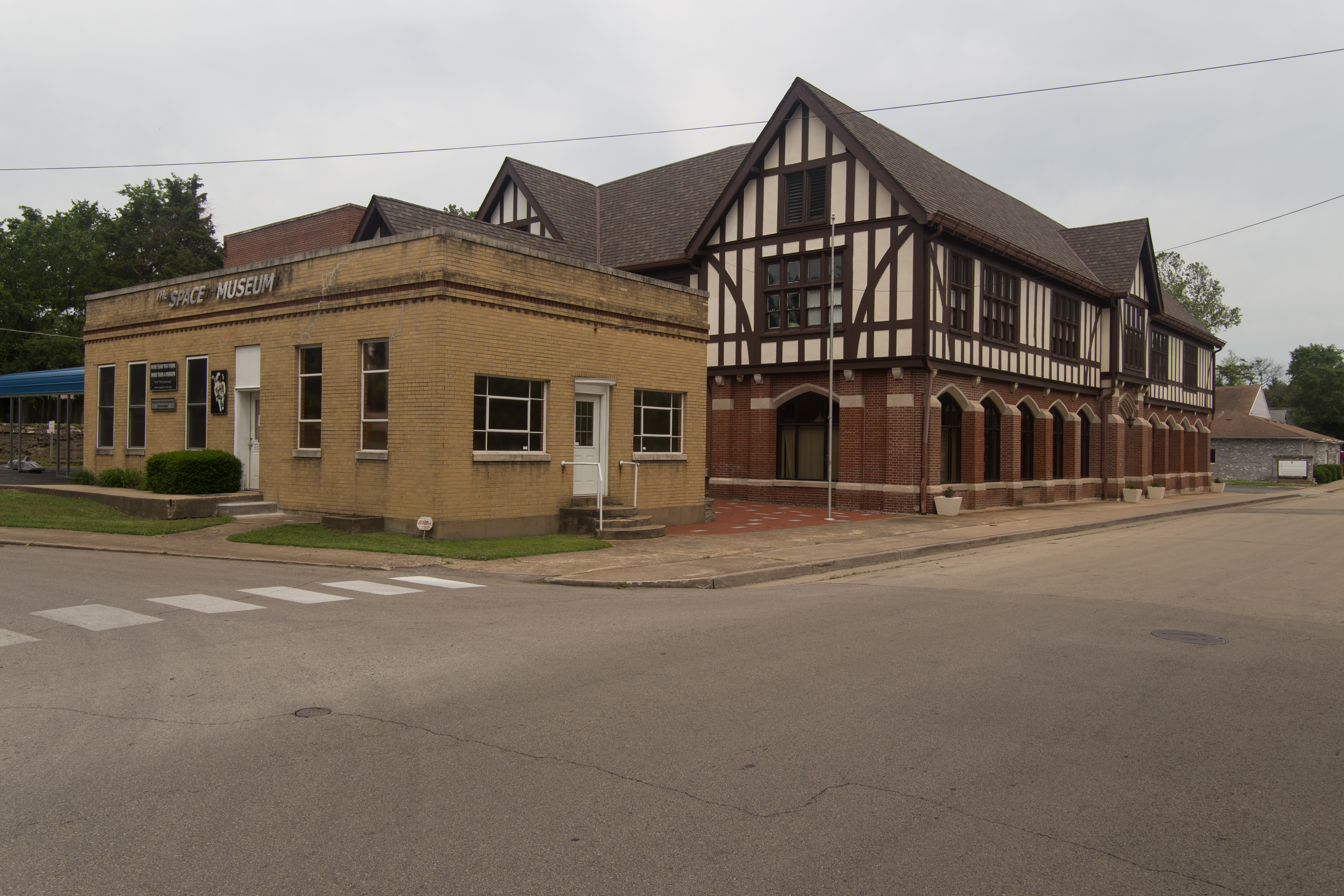
The Space Museum, exterior view, May 2019

In 1974, Bonne Terre Mine, and in 1984 St. Joe Lead Company Administration Building were listed on the National Register of Historic Places. The mine was the first in the network of St. Joe Minerals lead mines that led to Missouri producing 70 percent of the United States' lead in the Southeast Missouri Lead District. The mine was a target of Price's Raid during the American Civil War. The mine is open for tours and is also known as a scuba diving attraction.

The French village was a campsite on a trail branching of the Camino Real. Downtown architecture includes as the oldest building the Shepard house from 1869, while the former post office is from 1878 and a bathhouse (natatorium) is from 1889. The city hall from 1909 was built in Tudor style, and reportedly is a replica of Shakespeare´s home, while the modern city hall was built as a cash and carry store.

Bonne Terre is also home to a Space Museum. It has a flag that went to the moon with astronaut Eugene Cernan on Apollo 17.

== Notable people ==
- Ron Bockenkamp
- Will Compton
- Firmin V. Desloge
- Ray Sanders MLB All-Star, later an MLB scout
- Jon Simmons
- Patrick Williams

== See also ==
- List of cities in Missouri
