= St. Francois County, Missouri =

County in Missouri, United States

- County
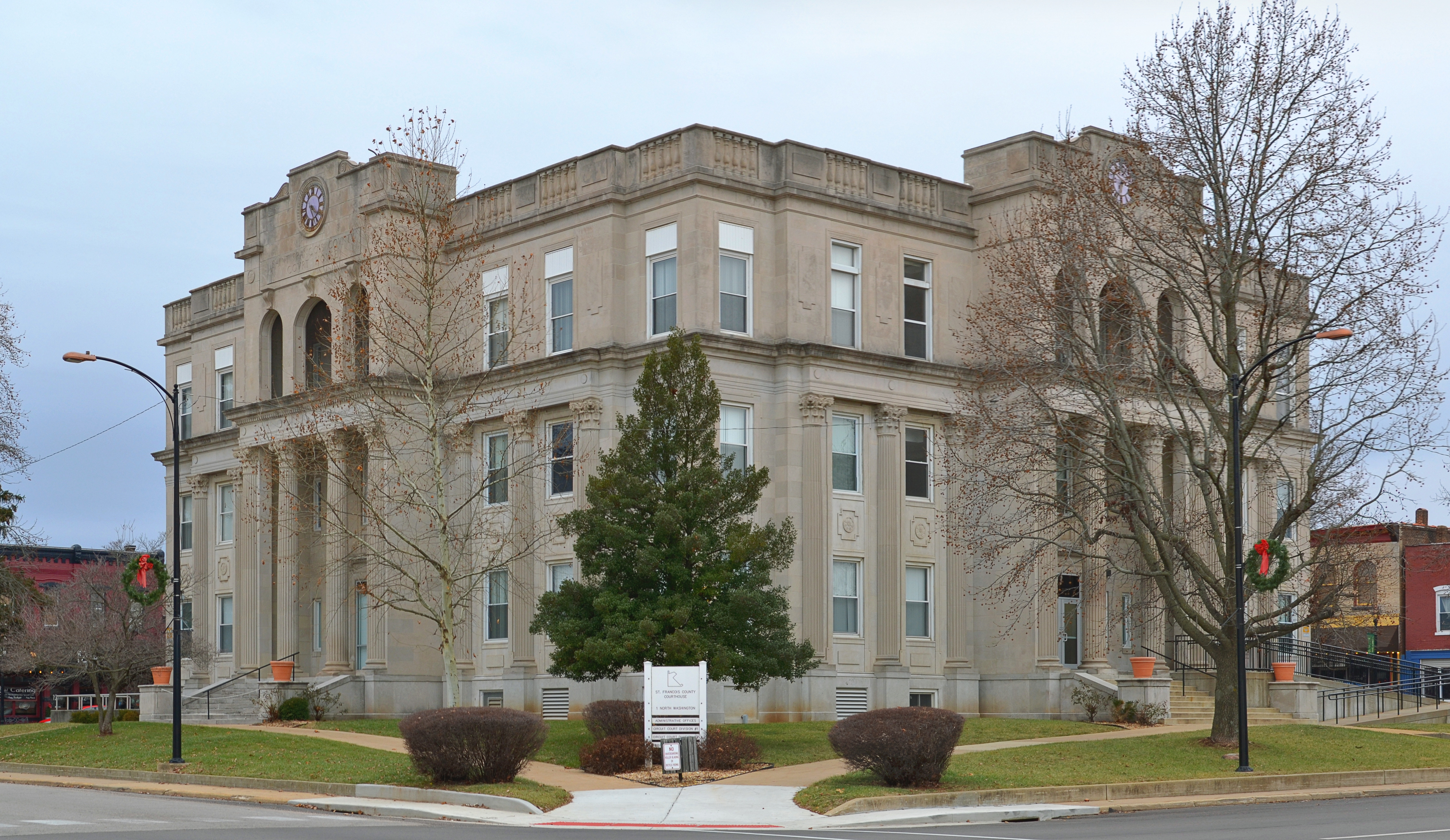
- St. Francois County Courthouse in Farmington

- Seal

- Location within the U.S. state of Missouri
- Coordinates: 37°46′55″N 90°25′20″W
- Country: United States
- State: Missouri
- Founded: December 19, 1821
- Named for: St. Francis River
- Seat: Farmington
- Largest city: Farmington

Area
  - Total: 455 sq mi (1,180 km^{2})
  - Land: 452 sq mi (1,170 km^{2})
  - Water: 2.8 sq mi (7.3 km^{2}) 0.6%

Population (2020)
  - Total: 66,922
  - Estimate (2025): 67,809 ▲
  - Density: 148/sq mi (57.2/km^{2})
- Time zone: UTC−6 (Central)
  - Summer (DST): UTC−5 (CDT)
- Congressional district: 8th
- Website: www.sfcgov.org

St. Francois County (/ˈfrænsɪs/ FRAN-siss) is a county in the Lead Belt region in the U.S. state of Missouri. At the 2020 census, the population was 66,922. The largest city and county seat is Farmington. The county was officially organized on December 19, 1821. It was named after the St. Francis River. The origin of the river's name is unclear. It may refer to St. Francis of Assisi. Another possibility is that Jacques Marquette, a Jesuit who explored the region in 1673, named the river for the Jesuit missionary Francis Xavier; Marquette had spent some time at the mission of St. François Xavier before his voyage and, as a Jesuit, was unlikely to have given the river a name honoring the Franciscans.

St. Francois County comprises the Farmington Micropolitan Statistical Area, which is also included in the St. Louis–St. Charles–Farmington–Illinois Combined Statistical Area.

== History ==
=== Seal ===
2018–2022

2022–present

A former county seal, used from 2018 to 2022, was posted on the subreddit r/CrappyDesign where it received considerable attention and was covered by local and national news organizations. It was criticized for being "overdone" and "amateurish," though some said they felt it stood out and was "spontaneous."

The 2018 seal was designed during a weekend deadline by county commissioner Harold Gallaher and incorporated components from an older 1982 seal designed by a high school student in needlework. The seal was unanimously approved by the county commission and was used on government signage and vehicles.

The seal featured clip art-style images of a bald eagle atop the American flag, a pickaxe and shovel, a Bible and Christian cross, and an outline of the county. It also featured the phrase "In God we trust" and the founding date of the county.

In response to the attention it received, the county held a contest to redesign the seal. Gallaher requested that the redesign make reference to the parks in the county as well as include elements from the old seal. The county received 264 or 282 entries from 33 counties and 35 states, of which three finalists were chosen. Some included the St. Francois County Courthouse and referenced the county's mining history. The winning design was submitted by Bryan Finch, a graphic designer from Farmington, Missouri, a city in St. Francois County.

== Adjacent counties ==
- Jefferson County (north)
- Ste. Genevieve County (east)
- Perry County (southeast)
- Madison County (south)
- Iron County (southwest)
- Washington County (west)

== Major highways ==
- U.S. Route 67
- Route 8
- Route 32
- Route 47
- Route 221

== National protected area ==
- Mark Twain National Forest (part)

== Demographics ==
Historical population
Census	Pop.	Note	%±
1830	2,366		—
1840	3,211		35.7%
1850	4,964		54.6%
1860	7,249		46.0%
1870	9,742		34.4%
1880	13,822		41.9%
1890	17,347		25.5%
1900	24,051		38.6%
1910	35,738		48.6%
1920	31,403		−12.1%
1930	35,832		14.1%
1940	35,950		0.3%
1950	35,276		−1.9%
1960	36,516		3.5%
1970	36,818		0.8%
1980	42,600		15.7%
1990	48,904		14.8%
2000	55,641		13.8%
2010	65,359		17.5%
2020	66,922		2.4%
2025 (est.)	67,809	▲	1.3%
U.S. Decennial Census; 1790-1960 1900-1990; 1990-2000 2010-2015

=== 2020 census ===
As of the 2020 census, the county had a population of 66,922. The median age was 40.3 years. 20.9% of residents were under the age of 18 and 17.3% of residents were 65 years of age or older. For every 100 females there were 113.3 males, and for every 100 females age 18 and over there were 116.5 males age 18 and over.

59.0% of residents lived in urban areas, while 41.0% lived in rural areas.

There were 24,792 households in the county, of which 29.6% had children under the age of 18 living with them and 26.5% had a female householder with no spouse or partner present. About 29.4% of all households were made up of individuals and 12.8% had someone living alone who was 65 years of age or older.

There were 28,636 housing units, of which 13.4% were vacant. Among occupied housing units, 65.9% were owner-occupied and 34.1% were renter-occupied. The homeowner vacancy rate was 2.4% and the rental vacancy rate was 9.1%.

=== Racial and ethnic composition ===
As of the 2020 census, the racial makeup of the county was 89.6% White, 4.0% Black or African American, 0.3% American Indian and Alaska Native, 0.6% Asian, 0.0% Native Hawaiian and Pacific Islander, 0.6% from some other race, and 4.9% from two or more races; Hispanic or Latino residents of any race comprised 1.6% of the population.

St. Francois County, Missouri – Racial and ethnic composition Note: the US Census treats Hispanic/Latino as an ethnic category. This table excludes Latinos from the racial categories and assigns them to a separate category. Hispanics/Latinos may be of any race.
Race / Ethnicity (NH = Non-Hispanic)	Pop 1980	Pop 1990	Pop 2000	Pop 2010	Pop 2020	% 1980	% 1990	% 2000	% 2010	% 2020
White alone (NH)	42,127	47,489	53,228	60,631	59,474	98.89%	97.11%	95.66%	92.77%	88.87%
Black or African American alone (NH)	107	945	1,105	2,759	2,645	0.25%	1.93%	1.99%	4.22%	3.95%
Native American or Alaska Native alone (NH)	33	103	188	228	192	0.08%	0.21%	0.34%	0.35%	0.29%
Asian alone (NH)	91	120	174	242	403	0.21%	0.25%	0.31%	0.37%	0.60%
Native Hawaiian or Pacific Islander alone (NH)	x	x	12	32	21	x	x	0.02%	0.05%	0.03%
Other race alone (NH)	23	8	14	12	188	0.05%	0.02%	0.03%	0.02%	0.28%
Mixed race or Multiracial (NH)	x	x	473	677	2,910	x	x	0.85%	1.04%	4.35%
Hispanic or Latino (any race)	219	239	447	778	1,089	0.51%	0.49%	0.80%	1.19%	1.63%
Total	42,600	48,904	55,641	65,359	66,922	100.00%	100.00%	100.00%	100.00%	100.00%

=== 2000 census ===
As of the census of 2000, there were 55,641 people, 20,793 households, and 14,659 families residing in the county. The population density was 124 inhabitants per square mile (48/km^{2}). There were 24,449 housing units at an average density of 54 units per square mile (21/km^{2}). The racial makeup of the county was 96.14% White, 2.02% African American, 0.35% Native American, 0.31% Asian, 0.02% Pacific Islander, 0.23% from other races, and 0.92% from two or more races. Hispanic or Latino of any race were 0.80% of the population.

There were 20,793 households, out of which 32.60% had children under the age of 18 living with them, 54.90% were married couples living together, 11.30% had a female householder with no husband present, and 29.50% were non-families. 24.90% of all households were made up of individuals, and 11.20% had someone living alone who was 65 years of age or older. The average household size was 2.48 and the average family size was 2.94.

In the county, the population was spread out, with 24.00% under the age of 18, 9.20% from 18 to 24, 29.40% from 25 to 44, 22.50% from 45 to 64, and 14.90% who were 65 years of age or older. The median age was 37 years. For every 100 females there were 103.30 males. For every 100 females age 18 and over, there were 101.90 males.

The median income for a household in the county was $39,551, and the median income for a family was $47,923. Males had a median income of $29,961 versus $19,412 for females. The per capita income for the county was $19,047. Approximately 14.90% of the population and 11.00% of families were below the poverty line, including 19.80% under the age of 18 and 11.50% over the age of 65.

=== Religion ===
According to the Association of Religion Data Archives County Membership Report (2000), St. Francois County is a part of the Bible Belt with evangelical Protestantism being the majority religion. The most predominant denominations among residents in St. Francois County who adhere to a religion are Southern Baptists (45.48%), Roman Catholics (14.94%), and Methodists (8.37%). There is also a small Orthodox Christian presence in the county, an example being Nativity of the Holy Virgin Mary Orthodox Church in Desloge.

Catholic Churches in the county are Immaculate Conception in Park Hills, St. Joseph in Farmington, St. Joseph in Bonne Terre, St. John in Bismarck, and St. Anne in French Village.

== Politics ==
=== Local ===
The Republican Party predominantly controls politics at the local level in St. Francois County. Republicans hold all but two of the county's elected positions.

St. Francois County, Missouri

Elected countywide officials
Assessor	Eric Dugal	Republican
Auditor	Louie Seiberlich	Republican
Circuit Clerk	Kristina Bone	Republican
County Clerk	Kevin Engler	Republican
Collector	Angie K. Usery	Republican
Commissioner (presiding)	Harold Gallaher	Republican
Commissioner (district 1)	Kary Buckley	Republican
Commissioner (district 2)	David Kater	Republican
Coroner	Jason Coplin	Republican
Prosecuting Attorney	Blake Dudley	Republican
Public Administrator	Gary Matheny	Republican
Recorder	Jay Graf	Republican
Sheriff	Daniel R. Bullock	Republican
Treasurer	Parks G. Peterson	Republican

=== State ===
St. Francois County is divided into three legislative districts in the Missouri House of Representatives.

- District 115 — Currently represented by Bill Lucas (R-De Soto).

Missouri House of Representatives — District 115 — St. Francois County (2020)
Party	Candidate	Votes	%	±%
Republican	Cyndi Buchheit Courtway	3,783	74.73%	
Democratic	Cynthia Nugent	1,272	25.13%	

Missouri House of Representatives — District 115 — St. Francois County (2018)
Party	Candidate	Votes	%	±%
Republican	Elaine Gannon	3,211	98.14%	

Missouri House of Representatives — District 115 — St. Francois County (2016)
Party	Candidate	Votes	%	±%
Republican	Elaine Gannon	3,010	68.63%	+3.40
Democratic	Barbara Stocker	1,196	27.27%	−2.98
Libertarian	Charles Bigelow	180	4.10%	+4.10

Missouri House of Representatives — District 115 — St. Francois County (2014)
Party	Candidate	Votes	%	±%
Republican	Elaine Gannon	1,486	65.23%	+13.26
Democratic	Dan Darian	689	30.25%	−17.78
Constitution	Jerry Dollar Jr.	103	4.52%	+4.52

Missouri House of Representatives — District 115 — St. Francois County (2012)
Party	Candidate	Votes	%	±%
Republican	Elaine Gannon	2,106	51.97%	
Democratic	Rich McCane	1,946	48.03%	

- District 116 — Currently represented by Dale Wright (politician) (R-Farmington). It consists of the southeastern section of the county, including part of Farmington.

Missouri House of Representatives — District 116 — St. Francois County (2020)
Party	Candidate	Votes	%	±%
Republican	Dale Wright	6,687	97.96%	

Missouri House of Representatives — District 116 — St. Francois County (2018)
Party	Candidate	Votes	%	±%
Republican	Dale Wright	4,374	70.12%	
Democratic	Bill Kraemer	1,855	29.74	

Missouri House of Representatives — District 116 — St. Francois County (2016)
Party	Candidate	Votes	%	±%
Republican	Kevin Engler	5,590	100.00%	

Missouri House of Representatives — District 116 — St. Francois County (2014)
Party	Candidate	Votes	%	±%
Republican	Kevin Engler	2,826	100.00%	

Missouri House of Representatives — District 116 — St. Francois County (2012)
Party	Candidate	Votes	%	±%
Republican	Kevin Engler	4,881	100.00%	

- District 117 — Currently represented by Mike Henderson (R-Bonne Terre). It consists of the western parts of the county and includes the communities of Bismarck, Bonne Terre, Desloge, Doe Run, Iron Mountain Lake, Leadington, Leadwood, and parts of Farmington and Park Hills.

Missouri House of Representatives — District 117 — St. Francois County (2020)
Party	Candidate	Votes	%	±%
Republican	Mike Henderson	10,485	73.21%	
Democratic	Tony Dorsett	3,817	26.65%	

Missouri House of Representatives — District 117 — St. Francois County (2018)
Party	Candidate	Votes	%	±%
Republican	Mike Henderson	8,169	71.92%	
Democratic	Kayla Chick	3,168	27.89%	

Missouri House of Representatives — District 117 — St. Francois County (2016)
Party	Candidate	Votes	%	±%
Republican	Mike Henderson	7,302	56.74%	+56.74
Democratic	Travis Barnes	5,567	43.26%	−56.74

Missouri House of Representatives — District 117 — St. Francois County (2014)
Party	Candidate	Votes	%	±%
Democratic	Linda Black	5,081	100.00%	

Missouri House of Representatives — District 117 — St. Francois County (2012)
Party	Candidate	Votes	%	±%
Democratic	Linda Black	9,704	100.00%	

All of St. Francois County is a part of Missouri's 3rd District in the Missouri Senate and is currently represented by Elaine Gannon (R-De Soto).

Missouri Senate — District 3 — St. Francois County (2020)
Party	Candidate	Votes	%	±%
Republican	Elaine Freeman Gannon	23,058	97.65%	

Missouri Senate — District 3 — St. Francois County (2016)
Party	Candidate	Votes	%	±%
Republican	Gary Romine	18,992	81.79%	+21.62
Green	Edward R. Weissler	4,229	18.21%	+18.21

Missouri Senate — District 3 — St. Francois County (2012)
Party	Candidate	Votes	%	±%
Republican	Gary Romine	13,329	60.17%	
Democratic	Joseph Fallert, Jr.	8,823	39.83%	

Past gubernatorial election results
Year	Republican	Democratic	Third Parties
2024	74.54% 20,827	23.35% 6,524	2.11% 591
2020	69.37% 19,258	27.67% 7,682	2.96% 823
2016	58.51% 14,433	38.20% 9,424	3.29% 811
2012	44.17% 9,965	52.88% 11,930	2.94% 664
2008	34.55% 8,418	63.49% 15,468	1.96% 478
2004	52.14% 11,903	46.43% 10,601	1.43% 327
2000	46.42% 8,712	50.22% 9,425	3.36% 632
1996	40.23% 7,192	57.19% 10,224	2.58% 461
1992	39.44% 7,350	60.56% 11,287	2.58% 461
1988	58.28% 9,401	40.94% 6,604	0.77% 125
1984	52.10% 8,777	47.90% 8,068	0.00% 0
1980	51.93% 8,797	47.89% 8,113	0.18% 30
1976	47.82% 7,569	52.13% 8,251	0.04% 7

=== Federal ===
U.S. Senate — Missouri — St. Francois County (2018)
Party	Candidate	Votes	%	±%
Republican	Josh Hawley	13,111	59.98%	
Democratic	Claire McCaskill	7,770	35.54%	
Libertarian	Japheth Campbell	342	1.56%	
Green	Jo Crain	157	0.72%	
Independent	Craig O'Dear	447	2.04%	

U.S. Senate — Missouri — St. Francois County (2016)
Party	Candidate	Votes	%	±%
Republican	Roy Blunt	13,110	53.32%	+12.57
Democratic	Jason Kander	10,117	41.15%	−11.23
Libertarian	Jonathan Dine	661	2.69%	−4.18
Green	Johnathan McFarland	431	1.75%	+1.75
Constitution	Fred Ryman	269	1.09%	+1.09

U.S. Senate — Missouri — St. Francois County (2012)
Party	Candidate	Votes	%	±%
Republican	Todd Akin	9,142	40.75%	
Democratic	Claire McCaskill	11,751	52.38%	
Libertarian	Jonathan Dine	1,540	6.87%	

St. Francois County is included in Missouri's 8th Congressional District and is currently represented by Jason T. Smith (R-Salem) in the U.S. House of Representatives. Smith won a special election on Tuesday, June 4, 2013, to finish out the remaining term of U.S. Representative Jo Ann Emerson (R-Cape Girardeau). Emerson announced her resignation a month after being reelected with over 70 percent of the vote in the district. She resigned to become CEO of the National Rural Electric Cooperative.

U.S. House of Representatives — District 8 — St. Francois County (2020)
Party	Candidate	Votes	%	±%
Republican	Jason T. Smith	19,505	71.53	
Democratic	Kathy Ellis	7,170	26.30	
Libertarian	Tom Schmitz	576	2.11	

U.S. House of Representatives — District 8 — St. Francois County (2018)
Party	Candidate	Votes	%	±%
Republican	Jason T. Smith	14,051	65.16%	
Democratic	Kathy Ellis	7,052	32.70%	
Libertarian	Jonathan Shell	444	2.06%	

U.S. House of Representatives — District 8 — St. Francois County (2016)
Party	Candidate	Votes	%	±%
Republican	Jason T. Smith	16,309	68.07%	+8.72
Democratic	Dave Cowell	6,933	28.94%	−1.86
Libertarian	Jonathan Shell	718	3.00%	+0.66

U.S. House of Representatives — District 8 — St. Francois County (2014)
Party	Candidate	Votes	%	±%
Republican	Jason T. Smith	7,317	59.35%	−2.46
Democratic	Barbara Stocker	3,798	30.80%	−2.64
Libertarian	Rick Vandeven	288	2.34%	+1.27
Constitution	Doug Enyart	465	3.77%	+0.50
Independent	Terry Hampton	461	3.74%	+3.74

U.S. House of Representatives — District 8 — Special Election – St. Francois County (2013)
Party	Candidate	Votes	%	±%
Republican	Jason T. Smith	1,850	61.81%	−7.50
Democratic	Steve Hodges	1,001	33.44%	+5.73
Libertarian	Bill Slantz	32	1.07%	−1.91
Constitution	Doug Enyart	98	3.27%	+3.27
Write-In	Wayne L. Byington	12	0.40%	+0.40

U.S. House of Representatives — District 8 — St. Francois County (2012)
Party	Candidate	Votes	%	±%
Republican	Jo Ann Emerson	15,423	69.31%	
Democratic	Jack Rushin	6,166	27.71%	
Libertarian	Rick Vandeven	664	2.98%	

United States presidential election results for St. Francois County, Missouri
Year	Republican		Democratic		Third party(ies)	
Year	No.	%	No.	%	No.	%
1888	1,445	38.44%	2,214	58.90%	100	2.66%
1892	1,253	36.53%	2,141	62.42%	36	1.05%
1896	1,664	42.37%	2,245	57.17%	18	0.46%
1900	2,295	45.30%	2,707	53.43%	64	1.26%
1904	2,894	51.25%	2,615	46.31%	138	2.44%
1908	3,260	48.56%	2,942	43.83%	511	7.61%
1912	2,305	37.03%	2,786	44.76%	1,134	18.22%
1916	3,015	43.79%	3,675	53.38%	195	2.83%
1920	5,504	49.86%	5,300	48.01%	235	2.13%
1924	6,117	51.16%	5,542	46.35%	297	2.48%
1928	9,040	68.34%	4,171	31.53%	17	0.13%
1932	6,017	43.59%	7,613	55.15%	174	1.26%
1936	7,271	47.79%	7,876	51.77%	66	0.43%
1940	8,687	51.55%	8,132	48.26%	32	0.19%
1944	7,320	52.00%	6,745	47.92%	11	0.08%
1948	6,234	46.03%	7,276	53.73%	32	0.24%
1952	9,672	54.55%	8,040	45.35%	17	0.10%
1956	9,968	56.85%	7,566	43.15%	0	0.00%
1960	10,131	58.44%	7,205	41.56%	0	0.00%
1964	5,690	35.00%	10,567	65.00%	0	0.00%
1968	7,492	47.60%	6,379	40.53%	1,867	11.86%
1972	8,812	65.42%	4,658	34.58%	0	0.00%
1976	7,002	44.01%	8,852	55.63%	57	0.36%
1980	8,914	52.70%	7,495	44.31%	507	3.00%
1984	9,792	57.84%	7,137	42.16%	0	0.00%
1988	7,923	49.13%	8,158	50.59%	46	0.29%
1992	5,889	31.08%	9,367	49.44%	3,691	19.48%
1996	6,200	34.98%	9,034	50.96%	2,492	14.06%
2000	9,327	49.50%	9,075	48.17%	439	2.33%
2004	12,087	52.71%	10,748	46.87%	98	0.43%
2008	12,660	51.57%	11,540	47.01%	350	1.43%
2012	13,248	58.35%	8,829	38.89%	628	2.77%
2016	17,468	70.10%	6,250	25.08%	1,202	4.82%
2020	20,511	73.25%	7,044	25.16%	446	1.59%
2024	21,521	75.21%	6,811	23.80%	283	0.99%

==== Covid-19 controversy ====
During the 2020 COVID-19 pandemic, the head of the St. Francois County Public Health Department described being driven to resign from her position by residents who refused to "accept the reality of the pandemic" and made "cowardly" anonymous threats against her and her family.

== Education ==
Of adults 25 years of age and older in St. Francois County, 72.4% possess a high school diploma or higher while 10.2% hold a bachelor's degree or higher as their highest level of educational attainment.

=== Public schools ===
- Bismarck R-V School District – Bismarck
  - Bismarck Elementary School (PK–06)
  - Bismarck High School (07–12)
- Farmington R-VII School District – Farmington
  - Jefferson Elementary School (01–04)
  - Lincoln Intermediate School (05–06)
  - Roosevelt Elementary School (01–04)
  - Truman Learning Center (PK-K)
  - Washington-Franklin Elementary School (01–04)
  - Farmington Middle School (07–08)
  - Farmington High School (09–12)
  - W.L. Johns Administrative Office Building
- North St. Francois County R-1 School District – Bonne Terre
  - North St. Francois County Primary School (PK–02) – Bonne Terre
  - North St. Francois County Parkside Elementary School (03–04) – Desloge
  - North St. Francois County Intermediate School (05–06) – Desloge
  - North St. Francois County Middle School (07–08) – Desloge
  - North St. Francois County High School (09–12) – Bonne Terre
- St. Francois County Central R-III School District – Park Hills
  - Park Hills Central Elementary School (K–02)
  - West Elementary School (03–05)
  - Park Hills Central Middle School (06–08)
  - Park Hills Central High School (09–12)
- West St. Francois County R-IV School District – Leadwood
  - West St. Francois County Elementary School (PK–05) – Park Hills
  - West St. Francois County Middle School (06–08) – Leadwood
  - West St. Francois County High School (09–12) – Park Hills

=== Private schools ===
- St. Paul Lutheran School – Farmington – (PK–12) – Lutheran Church–Missouri Synod
- St. Joseph School – Farmington – (K–08) – Roman Catholic
- St. Joseph Elementary School – Bonne Terre – (PK–06) – Roman Catholic

=== Vocational-technical and other schools ===
- Juvenile Detention Center – Farmington – (04–12)
- Midwest Learning Center – Farmington – (04–12)
- Unitec Career Center – Bonne Terre – (10–12)

=== Colleges and universities ===
- Mineral Area College – Park Hills – A public, two-year community college.

=== Public libraries ===
- Bonne Terre Memorial Library
- Farmington Public Library

== Communities ==
=== Cities ===
- Bismarck
- Bonne Terre
- Desloge
- Farmington (county seat)
- Iron Mountain Lake
- Leadington
- Leadwood
- Park Hills

=== Census-designated places ===
- Doe Run
- Frankclay
- Goose Creek Lake
- Knob Lick
- Lake Timberline
- Terre du Lac
- Wortham

=== Other unincorporated communities ===
- Blackwell
- Cross Roads
- De Lassus
- French Village
- Gumbo
- Halifax
- Hamilton Town
- Hazel Run
- Hurryville
- Iron Mountain
- Koester
- Libertyville
- Loughboro
- Mineral City
- Middlebrook
- Mitchell
- Ogborn
- Old Mines
- Rock Springs
- Settletown
- Silver Springs
- Syenite

=== Former communities ===
- Elvins
- Esther
- Fairview Acres
- Flat River
- Rivermines

== See also ==
- National Register of Historic Places listings in St. Francois County, Missouri
