= Columbia Historic District =

Columbia Historic District may refer to:

== In the United States ==
- Columbia Historic District (Sonora, California), listed on the National Register of Historic Places (NRHP)
- Columbia Green Historic District, Columbia, Connecticut, NRHP-listed
- Columbia City Historic District (Columbia City, Indiana), NRHP-listed in Whitley County
- Columbia Avenue Historic District, Davenport, Iowa, NRHP-listed
- Columbia Commercial Historic District (Columbia, Kentucky), NRHP-listed in Adair County
- West Columbia Street District in Somerset, Kentucky, NRHP-listed in Kentucky
- Downtown Columbia Historic District (Columbia, Louisiana), NRHP-listed in Louisiana
- Columbia Road–Bellevue Street Historic District, Dorchester, Boston, Massachusetts, USA
- Downtown Columbia Historic District in Columbia, Mississippi, NRHP-listed in Marion County
- Downtown Columbia, Missouri, which includes a Downtown Columbia Historic District NRHP-listed
- East Columbia Historic District (Farmington, Missouri), NRHP-listed
- Columbia Historic District (Columbia, North Carolina), NRHP-listed
- Columbia River Highway Historic District, Oregon, NRHP-listed
- Columbia Historic District (Columbia, Pennsylvania), NRHP-listed
- Columbia Historic District I, Columbia, South Carolina, NRHP-listed
- Columbia Historic District II, Columbia, South Carolina, NRHP-listed
- Columbia Commercial Historic District (Columbia, South Carolina), NRHP-listed in South Carolina
- Columbia Commercial Historic District in Columbia, Tennessee, NRHP-listed in Maury County
- Columbia West End Historic District in Columbia, Tennessee, NRHP-listed in Maury County
- East Columbia Historic District in East Columbia, Texas, NRHP-listed in Texas
- Columbia Forest Historic District, Arlington, Virginia, NRHP-listed
- Columbia City Historic District (Seattle, Washington), NRHP-listed
- Columbia Historic District (Cedarburg, Wisconsin), NRHP-listed in Wisconsin

== Other uses ==
- Columbia Commercial Historic District (disambiguation)
- Downtown Columbia Historic District (disambiguation)
- East Columbia Historic District (disambiguation)
- Columbia City Historic District (disambiguation)

== See also ==
- District of Columbia (disambiguation) and Columbia District
- Columbia (disambiguation)
