= National Register of Historic Places listings in St. Francois County, Missouri =

Location of St. Francois County in Missouri

This is a list of the National Register of Historic Places listings in St. Francois County, Missouri.

This is intended to be a complete list of the properties and districts on the National Register of Historic Places in St. Francois County, Missouri, United States. Latitude and longitude coordinates are provided for many National Register properties and districts; these locations may be seen together on an online map.

There are 11 properties and districts listed on the National Register in the county.

This National Park Service list is complete through NPS recent listings posted December 12, 2025.

== Current listings ==
	Name on the Register	Image	Date listed	Location	City or town	Description
1	Bonne Terre Depot	Bonne Terre Depot	April 5, 1984 (#84002606)	Oak St. 37°55′07″N 90°32′56″W	Bonne Terre	
2	Bonne Terre Mine	Bonne Terre Mine	September 9, 1974 (#74002281)	MO 47; 37°55′22″N 90°33′08″W	Bonne Terre	
3	Courthouse Square Historic District	Courthouse Square Historic District	June 9, 2004 (#04000582)	Roughly bounded by W. Spring St., N. Washington St., W. Harrison St., and A St. 37°46′51″N 90°25′20″W	Farmington	
4	East Columbia Historic District	East Columbia Historic District	July 14, 2004 (#04000699)	Southern side of East Columbia: 14-122 E. Columbia, northern side; 101-103 and 117-119 E. Columbia; also 202 E. Columbia St. 37°46′49″N 90°25′11″W	Farmington	202 E. Columbia represents a boundary increase of May 30, 2007
5	Eugene Field School		September 6, 2005 (#05000997)	403 Glendale St. 37°51′18″N 90°31′09″W	Park Hills	
6	Farmington State Hospital No. 4 Cemetery		October 25, 2010 (#08001360)	¼ mile south of Doubet Rd. on east side of Pullan Rd. 37°45′40″N 90°26′28″W	Farmington	
7	Howlett Gulf		November 14, 2019 (#100004602)	10 E. Main St. 37°50′56″N 90°30′58″W	Park Hills	
8	James Robinson McCormick House	James Robinson McCormick House	July 31, 1998 (#98000945)	324 W. Columbia St. 37°46′50″N 90°25′33″W	Farmington	
9	Presbyterian Orphanage of Missouri	Presbyterian Orphanage of Missouri	April 26, 2006 (#06000322)	412 W. Liberty St. 37°47′00″N 90°25′39″W	Farmington	
10	St. Francois County Jail and Sheriff's Residence	St. Francois County Jail and Sheriff's Residence	July 19, 1996 (#96000764)	11 N. Franklin St. 37°46′52″N 90°25′23″W	Farmington	
11	St. Joe Lead Company Administration Building		April 5, 1984 (#84002611)	Elm St. 37°55′16″N 90°32′59″W	Bonne Terre	

== See also ==
- List of National Historic Landmarks in Missouri
- National Register of Historic Places listings in Missouri
