= Columbia Commercial Historic District =

Columbia Commercial Historic District may refer to:

- Columbia Commercial Historic District (Columbia, Kentucky), listed on the National Register of Historic Places in Adair County
- Columbia Commercial Historic District (Columbia, South Carolina), NRHP-listed
- Columbia Commercial Historic District (Columbia, Tennessee), NRHP-listed in Maury County

== See also ==
- Columbia Historic District (disambiguation)
