= Louise F. Suddick =

American poet and author (1856–1943)

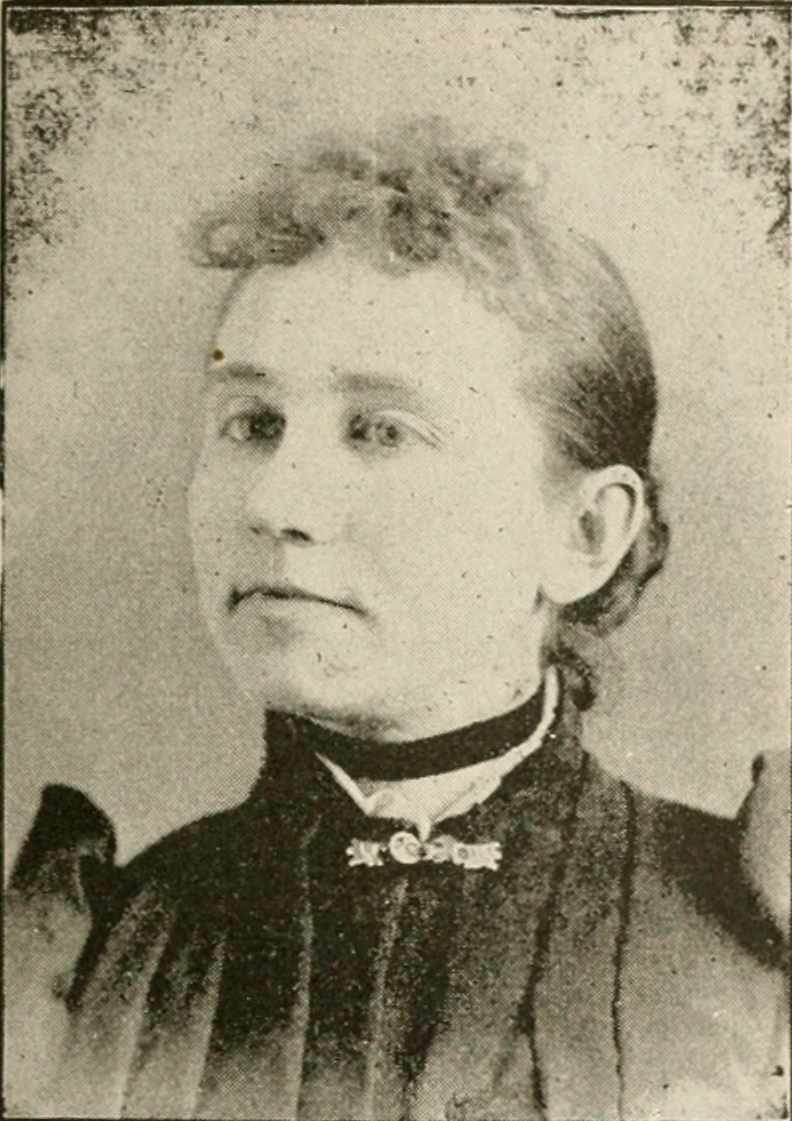
- Born: October 21, 1856; Farmington
- Died: December 29, 1943 (aged 87); Liberty
- Occupation: Poet, novelist
- Spouse(s): S. T. Suddick

Louise Farley Suddick (October 21, 1856 – December 29, 1943) was an American poet and novelist.

Louise Farley was born on October 21, 1856 in Farmington, Missouri. She married physician S. T. Suddick and lived in Cuba, Missouri. She published poetry and articles in a variety of publications. Her novel Zerelda: A Story of Love and Death (1899) features an astral voyage to another planet.

Louise F. Suddick died on 29 December 1943 in Liberty, Missouri.

== Bibliography ==
- Zerelda: A Story of Love and Death (New York: F Tennyson Neely, 1899)
