= Downtown Columbia =

Downtown Columbia may refer to:

- Downtown Columbia, Missouri
- Downtown Columbia, South Carolina

== See also ==
- Downtown Columbia Historic District (disambiguation)
- Columbia (disambiguation) § Places
