= East Columbia =

East Columbia may refer to:

- East Columbia Historic District (Farmington, Missouri)
- East Columbia Business District, Columbia, Maryland
- East Columbia, Portland, Oregon
- East Columbia, Texas
