= East Columbia Historic District =

East Columbia Historic District may refer to:

- East Columbia Historic District (Farmington, Missouri), listed on the NRHP in Missouri
- East Columbia Historic District (East Columbia, Texas), listed on the NRHP in Texas

== See also ==
- Columbia Historic District (disambiguation)
