= Columbia City Historic District =

Columbia City Historic District may refer to:

- Columbia City Historic District (Columbia City, Indiana), listed on the National Register of Historic Places in Whitley County, Indiana
- Columbia City Historic District (Seattle, Washington), listed on the National Register of Historic Places in King County, Washington
