= Presbyterian Orphanage of Missouri =

- U.S. National Register of Historic Places
- U.S. Historic district
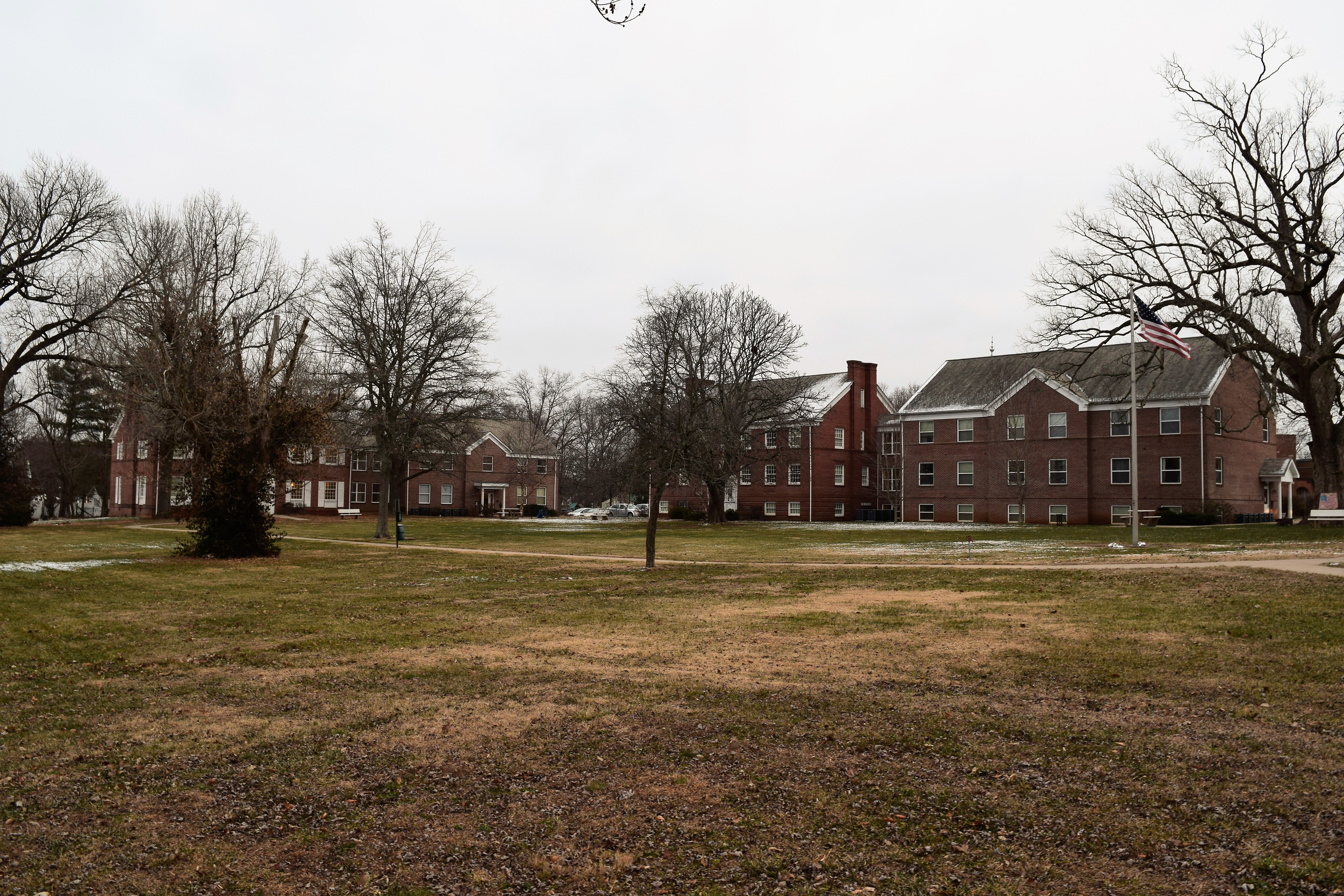

- Location within Missouri Location within the United States
- Location: 412 W. Liberty St., Farmington, Missouri
- Coordinates: 37°47′00″N 90°25′39″W
- Area: 4.3 acres (1.7 ha)
- Built by: Cook, John McM, et al.
- Architect: Stiegemeyer, O.W.
- Architectural style: Georgian Revival
- NRHP reference No.: 06000322
- Added to NRHP: April 26, 2006

Presbyterian Orphanage of Missouri, also known as Farmington Children's Home and Presbyterian Children's Home, is a historic orphanage and national historic district located at 412 West Liberty Street in Farmington, St. Francois County, Missouri. The district encompasses five contributing large brick buildings built between 1939 and the early 1950s in the Georgian Revival style. They are the Administration Building and Dining Hall, built in 1939 and enlarged in the 1940s, two large dormitories built in the early 1950s (Dearing Hall and Harlan Hall), and a smaller "hospital" building known as Holmes Cottage built in 1940.

The Presbyterian Children's Home vacated the campus in 1999 when it moved to the 600 block of Pine Street. After a 2018 merger with a Texas charity, the organization is now known as Presbyterian Children's Homes and Services. Although a file photo of the historic building appeared in a 2019 article about the agency, the Liberty Street campus remains an apartment complex for senior citizens.

It was added to the National Register of Historic Places in 2006.
