= Courthouse Square Historic District (Farmington, Missouri) =

Historic district in Missouri, United States

- U.S. National Register of Historic Places
- U.S. Historic district
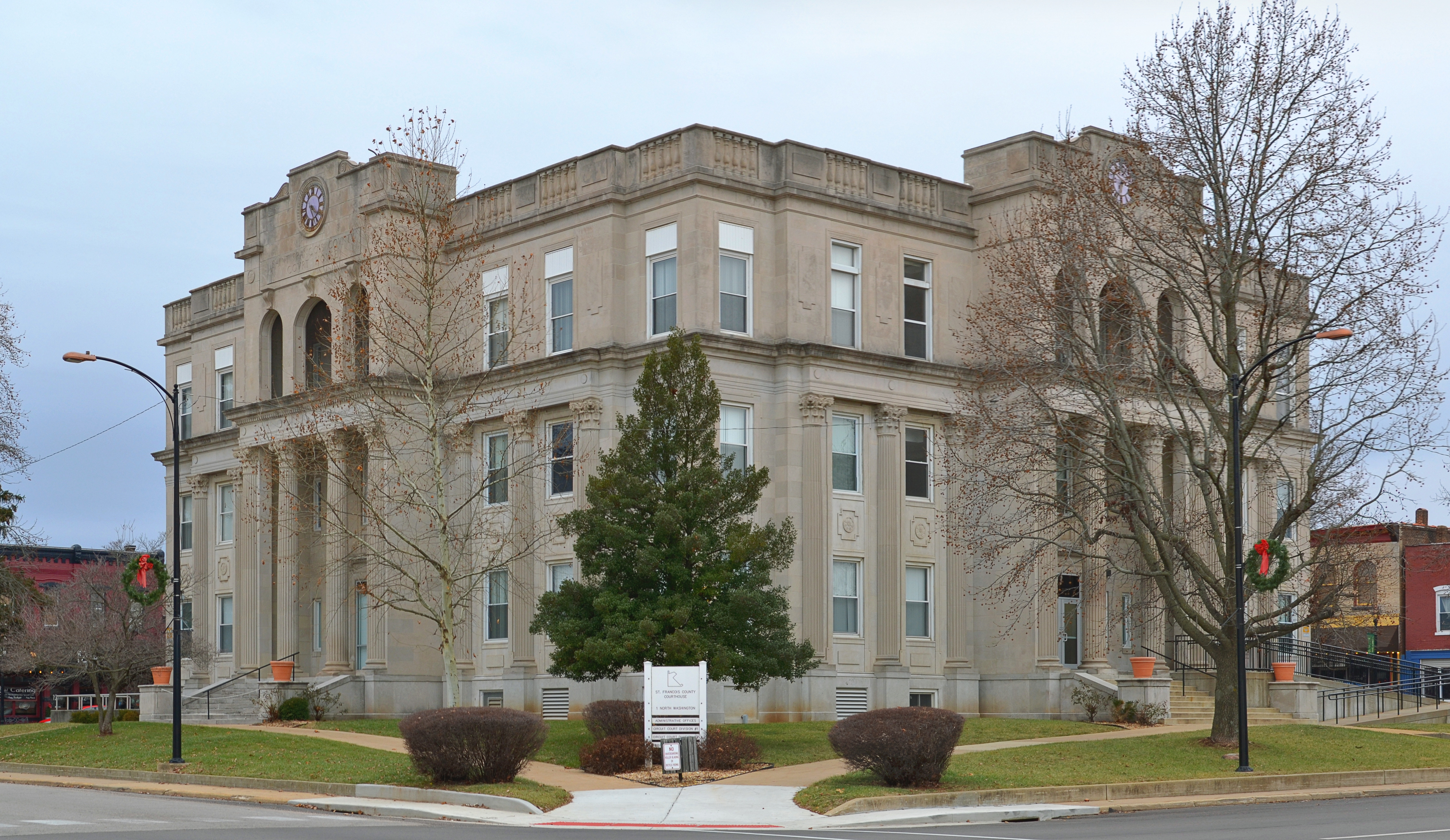
- St. Francois County Courthouse, January 2015

- Location within Missouri Location within the United States
- Location: Roughly bounded by W. Spring St., N. Washington St., W. Harrison St., and A St., Farmington, Missouri
- Coordinates: 37°46′49″N 90°25′11″W
- Area: 8.5 acres (3.4 ha)
- Architect: Pond, Charles H.; et.al.
- Architectural style: Mid 19th Century Revival, Late Victorian
- NRHP reference No.: 04000582
- Added to NRHP: June 9, 2004

The Courthouse Square Historic District is a national historic district located at Farmington, St. Francois County, Missouri. The district encompasses 26 contributing buildings in the central business district of Farmington. It developed between about 1871 and 1954, and includes representative examples of Greek Revival, Gothic Revival, Late Victorian, Beaux Arts, and Bungalow / American Craftsman style architecture. Located in the district is the separately listed St. Francois County Jail and Sheriff's Residence. Other notable buildings include the St. Francois County Courthouse (c. 1926), Rottger Building (c. 1904), Gierse Tailor Shop (c. 1876), Long Memorial Hall (1924), Methodist Episcopal Church (c. 1904), Masonic Temple (c. 1911), and Fitz Building (c. 1937).

It was listed on the National Register of Historic Places in 2004.
