= Columbia Road–Bellevue Street Historic District =

Historic district in Massachusetts, United States

- U.S. National Register of Historic Places
- U.S. Historic district
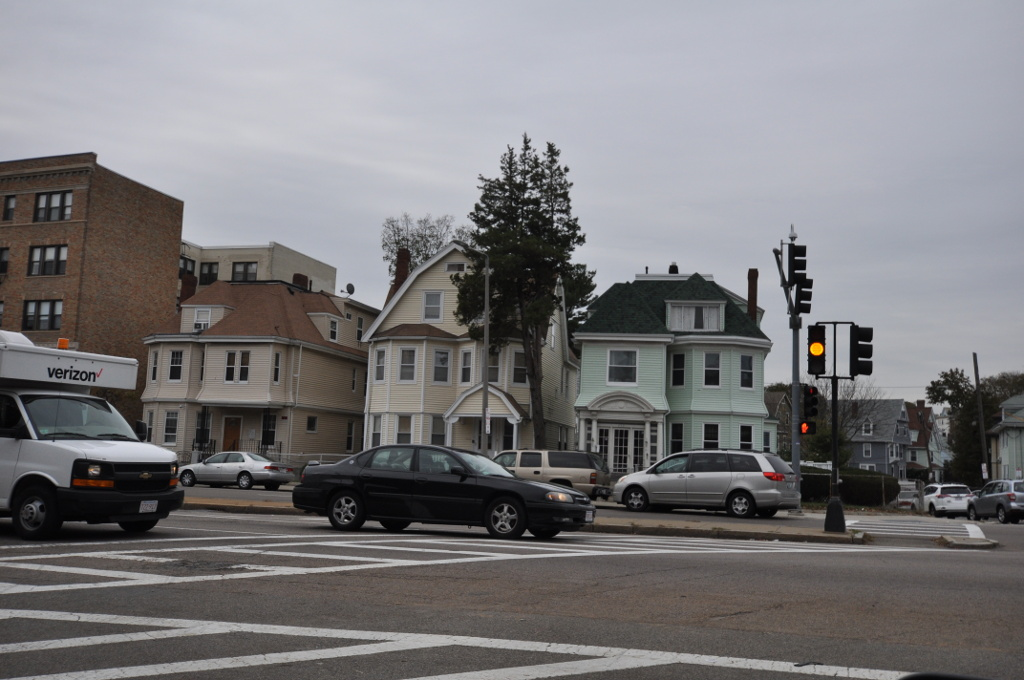

- Location within Massachusetts Location within the United States
- Location: 400-500 blocks Columbia Rd., part of Bellevue St., Dorchester, Boston, Massachusetts
- Coordinates: 42°18′46″N 71°4′6″W
- Architect: Multiple
- NRHP reference No.: 100001582
- Added to NRHP: September 8, 2017

The Columbia Road–Bellevue Street Historic District encompasses a collection of brick residential apartment houses on Columbia Road and Bellevue Street in the Dorchester neighborhood of Boston, Massachusetts. Arrayed mainly on Columbia Road between Wheelock Avenue and Bodwell Street, south of the Uphams Corner commercial area, area collection of primarily late 19th and early 20th-century multiunit residential buildings, built when the area was developed as a streetcar suburb. Most of these are Colonial Revival masonry or frame buildings three and four stories in height, although some exhibit Queen Anne features. There are a few older Greek Revival buildings in the district, and a number of apartment blocks built in the 1920s during a second phase of development.

The district was listed on the National Register of Historic Places in 2017.

== See also ==
- National Register of Historic Places listings in southern Boston, Massachusetts
