= James Robinson McCormick House =

Historic house in Missouri, United States

- U.S. National Register of Historic Places
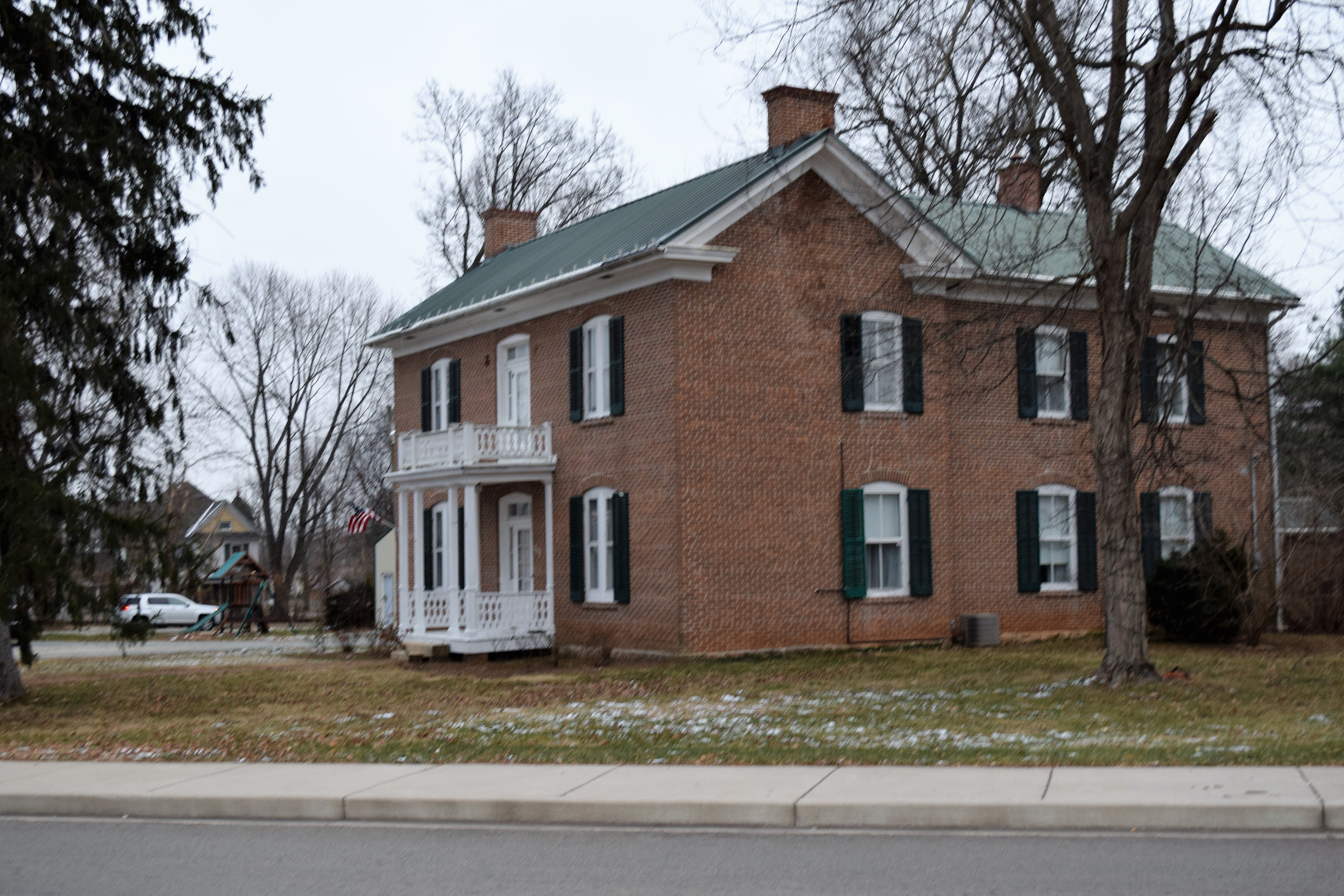

- Location within Missouri Location within the United States
- Location: 324 W. Columbia St., Farmington, Missouri
- Coordinates: 37°46′50″N 90°25′33″W
- Area: 1 acre (0.40 ha)
- Built: c. 1875
- Architectural style: Greek Revival
- NRHP reference No.: 98000945
- Added to NRHP: July 31, 1998

James Robinson McCormick House is a historic home located at Farmington, St. Francois County, Missouri. It was built circa 1875 for former United States Congressman James Robinson McCormick, and is a two-story, L-shaped, vernacular Greek Revival style red brick I-house with a rear ell. It has a low-pitched gable roof with wide bands of cornice molding and measures approximately 44 feet, 6 inches, wide and 64 feet, 4 inches, long. It features a single-story white portico supported by six white square columns. Also on the property is a contributing small brick wash house.

It was added to the National Register of Historic Places in 1998.
