= Farmington State Hospital No. 4 Cemetery =

Historic cemetery in St. Francis County, Missouri, US

- U.S. National Register of Historic Places
- Location within Missouri Location within the United States
- Location: ¼ mile south of Doubet Rd. on east side of Pullan Rd., near Farmington, Missouri
- Coordinates: 37°44′40″N 90°26′28″W
- Area: 1.9 acres (0.77 ha)
- Built: c. 1875
- NRHP reference No.: 08001360
- Added to NRHP: October 25, 2010

Farmington State Hospital No. 4 Cemetery is a historic cemetery located near Farmington, St. Francois County, Missouri. It was established in 1903, and is a rectangular plot measuring 180 feet by 450 feet. The cemetery is divided into 24 sections each containing 50 graves marked by simple wooden crosses. The entrance is marked by two concrete pillars molded to look like stylized columns. The cemetery was established as the burial ground for Missouri State Hospital #4.

It was added to the National Register of Historic Places in 2010.
