= Columbia Avenue Historic District =

Historic district in Iowa, United States

- U.S. National Register of Historic Places
- U.S. Historic district
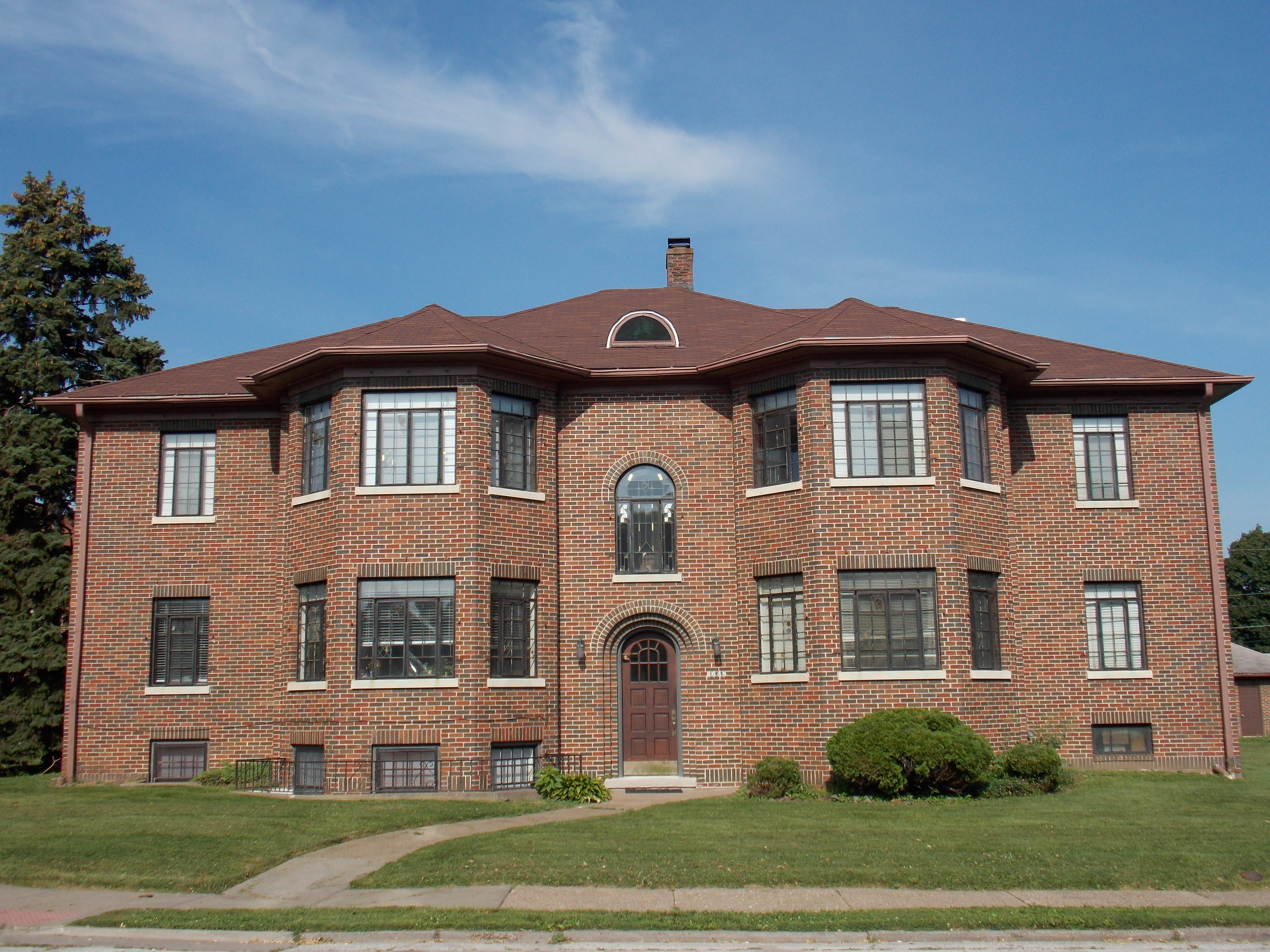
- Building at 2648 Ripley Street

- Location within Iowa Location within the United States
- Location: Roughly W. Columbia Avenue, and Harrison and Ripley and W. Hayes Streets, Davenport, Iowa
- Coordinates: 41°32′49″N 90°34′40″W
- Area: 6.95 acres (2.81 ha)
- Built: 1930-1939
- MPS: Davenport MRA
- NRHP reference No.: 84000298
- Added to NRHP: November 1, 1984

Columbia Avenue Historic District is located in the central part of the city of Davenport, Iowa, United States. It was listed on the National Register of Historic Places in 1984. The district lies north and west of Vander Veer Park. The area is entirely residential and it contains brick apartment buildings that were built between 1930 and 1939. It is one of the city's smallest districts and it is unique among the other historic districts in that it contains primarily apartment buildings.

== History ==
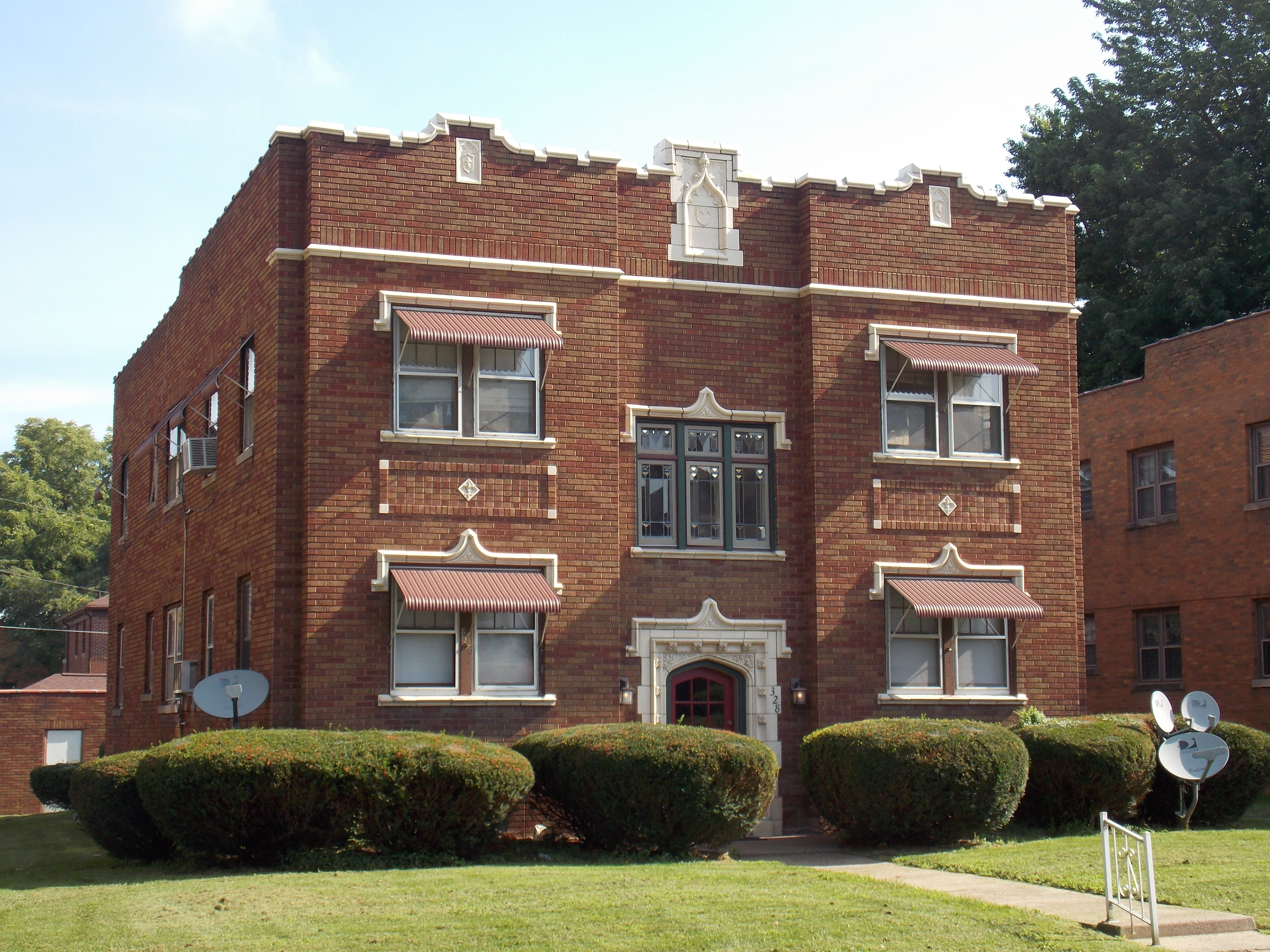
Building at 328 Columbia Avenue

The historic district is quite possibly the earliest apartment complex in the city of Davenport. The city has a long history of multiple-family housing. There is at least one row house from the 1860s still in existence. The double-house, or duplex, was popular in the city throughout the 19th century and were designed in the same styles as single-family dwellings. Larger apartment blocks of three to five floors were built in and around the city center for middle and upper-middle class households around the turn of the 20th century. During the 1910s and 1920s, most residential construction in the city was devoted to single-family homes. Harrison Manor was built from 1925 to 1926. It is a 46-unit building on Harrison Street, across from Vander Veer Park. At the time it was the largest apartment building constructed in Davenport and was similar to the apartment blocks that were being built in Chicago during the same time period.

The apartment complex centered on Columbia Avenue was begun in 1930 by Mclnnes Brothers, a local contractor and developer. It is located a block northwest of Vander Veer Park. They had several buildings of the complex under construction when they went bankrupt in 1931. Otto Behrens and John F. Steffen stepped in and completed the buildings begun by Mclnnes Brothers. Archie Mclnnes reorganized the construction firm and completed the five remaining buildings in the complex.

== Architecture ==
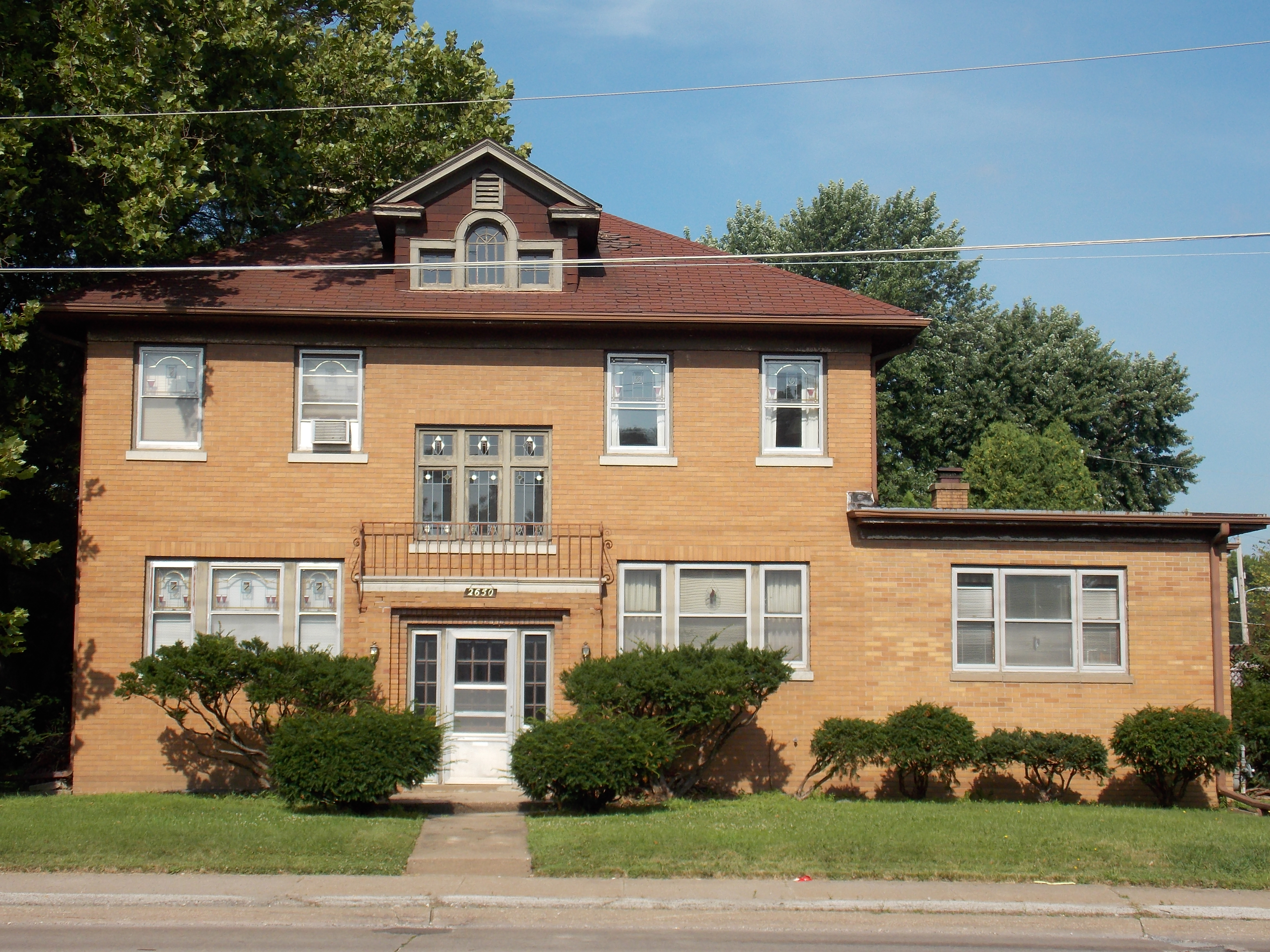
Building at 2650 Harrison Street

The apartment buildings in the Columbia Avenue Historic District are made up of 19 four to six-unit apartment buildings that were built between 1930 and 1939 and two similar structures built in the 1950s. The buildings form a complex along city streets. Eight of the buildings face both sides of West Columbia Avenue, which runs through the middle of the district between Harrison and Ripley Streets. Three of the buildings flank Columbia facing Harrison. Four more building face West Hayes Street to the north, and six buildings face Ripley Street on the west.

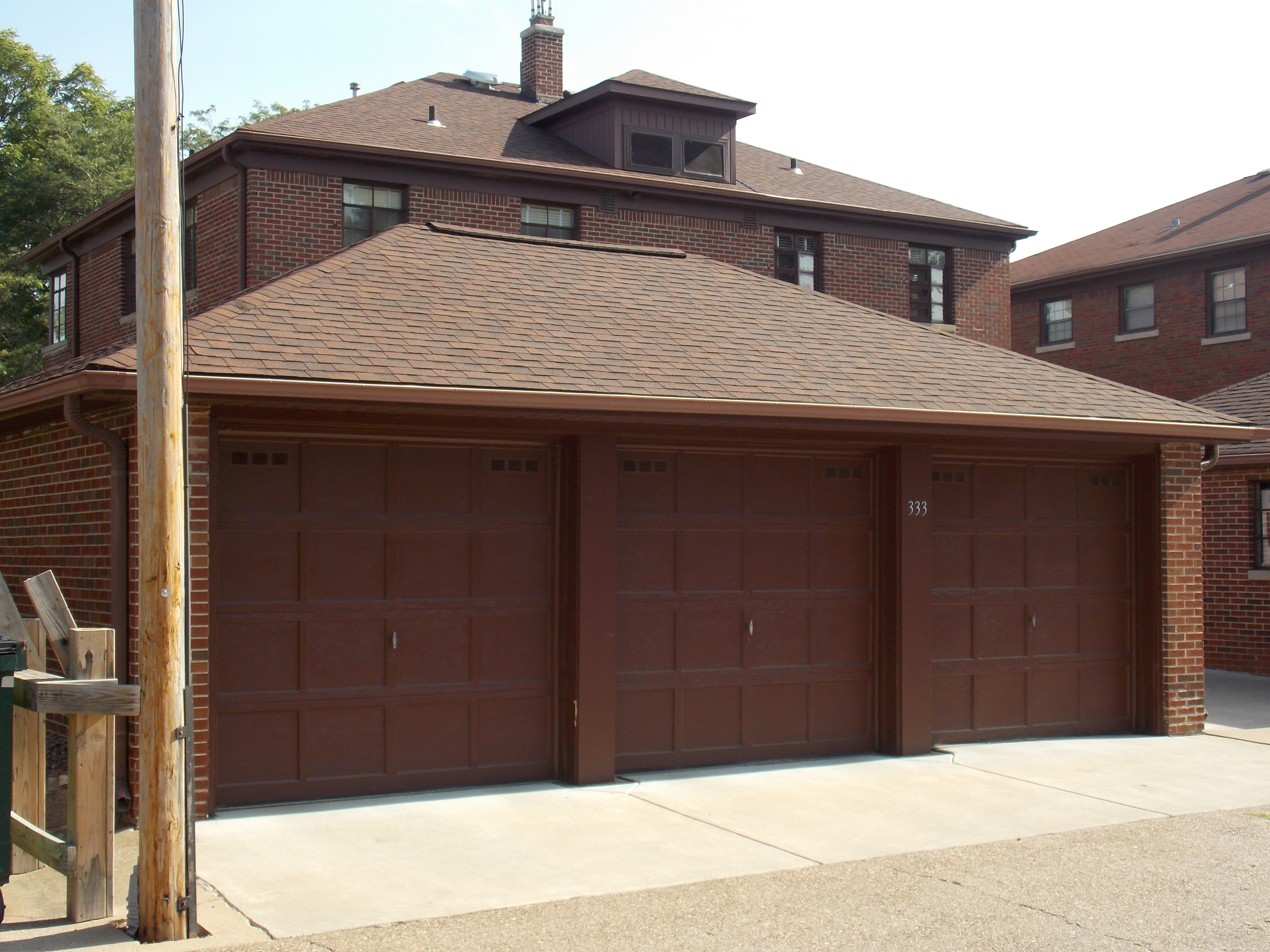
The garage behind 333 West Hayes Street

There are several characteristics that are basic to each structure. They are all two stories with a raised basement-level unit. All of the buildings follow a rectangular plan with a symmetrical three or five-bay main facade. They are all frame construction and the exteriors are covered with polychrome tapestry brick. For the most part, the decorative detail of each building is restrained with the main entrance as the primary decorative element. Each unit has a matching brick multi-car garage that faces an alley. While all of the buildings contain the above characteristics they are each distinct in appearance from each other.

The differences in each building are largely found in their decorative detail. Some of the buildings have flat roofs with parapets and a recessed main entrance bay. Others have hipped roofs with dormers and a flat facade, or a projecting central bay that terminates in shallow gables with partial returns. The main entrances into the buildings also differ in style and shape. Some of the entrances are rectangular, while others have a round-arch or a depressed Tudor arch. The door surrounds are composed of brick, rock-faced stone, or glazed terracotta. A number of the newer buildings feature end-bay windows. The stairwell windows also differ from building to building. Some contain leaded glass and stained glass, while others have bits of mirror glass that are used in abstract designs.
