= St. Francois County Jail and Sheriff's Residence =

- U.S. National Register of Historic Places
- U.S. Historic district – Contributing property
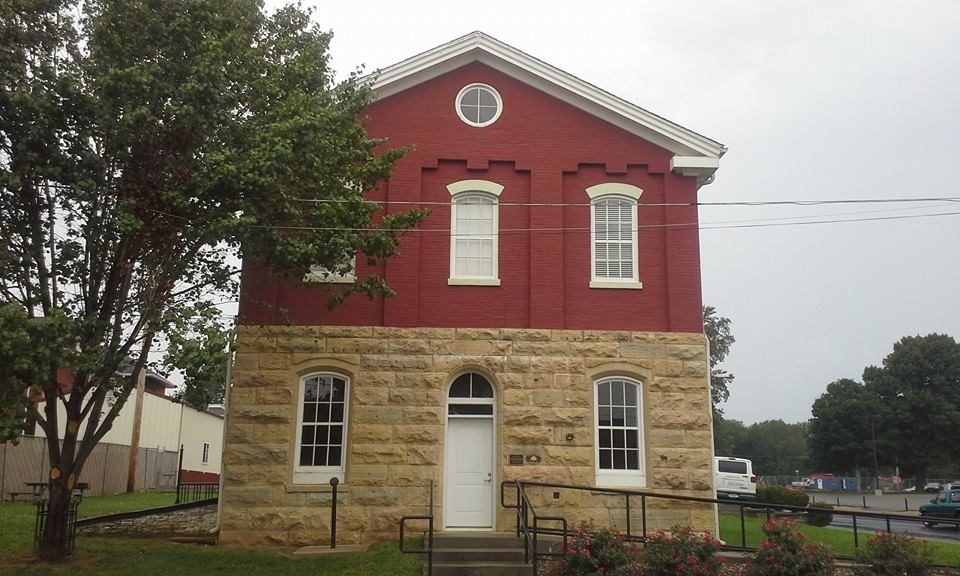
- St. Francois County Jail and Sheriff's Residence, September 2014

- Location within Missouri Location within the United States
- Location: 11 N. Franklin St., Farmington, Missouri
- Coordinates: 37°46′52″N 90°25′23″W
- Area: less than one acre
- Built: 1871
- Architect: Pond, Charles H.; Emerlauer, John
- Architectural style: Greek Revival
- NRHP reference No.: 96000764
- Added to NRHP: July 19, 1996

St. Francois County Jail and Sheriff's Residence is a historic jail and sheriff's residence located in Farmington, St. Francois County, Missouri. It was built in 1870–1871, and is a two-story, three-bay, Greek Revival-style brick and limestone building. It has a front gable roof and centered arched front doorway. The building was enlarged slightly around 1909. By 1996, it was one of the oldest operating jails in Missouri, but it was retired in September of that year when the jail moved to a newer and larger facility. The building now serves as a low-cost inn for people traveling along the TransAmerica Bicycle Trail.

It was added to the National Register of Historic Places in 1996. It is located in the Courthouse Square Historic District.
