= Downtown Columbia Historic District =

Downtown Columbia Historic District may refer to:

- Downtown Columbia Historic District (Columbia, Louisiana), listed on the NRHP in Louisiana
- Downtown Columbia Historic District in Columbia, Mississippi, listed on the NRHP in Mississippi
- Downtown Columbia, Missouri, which includes a Downtown Columbia Historic District listed on the NRHP in Missouri

== See also ==
- Columbia Historic District (disambiguation)
