= Columbia City Historic District (Columbia City, Indiana) =

Historic district in Indiana, United States

- U.S. National Register of Historic Places
- U.S. Historic district
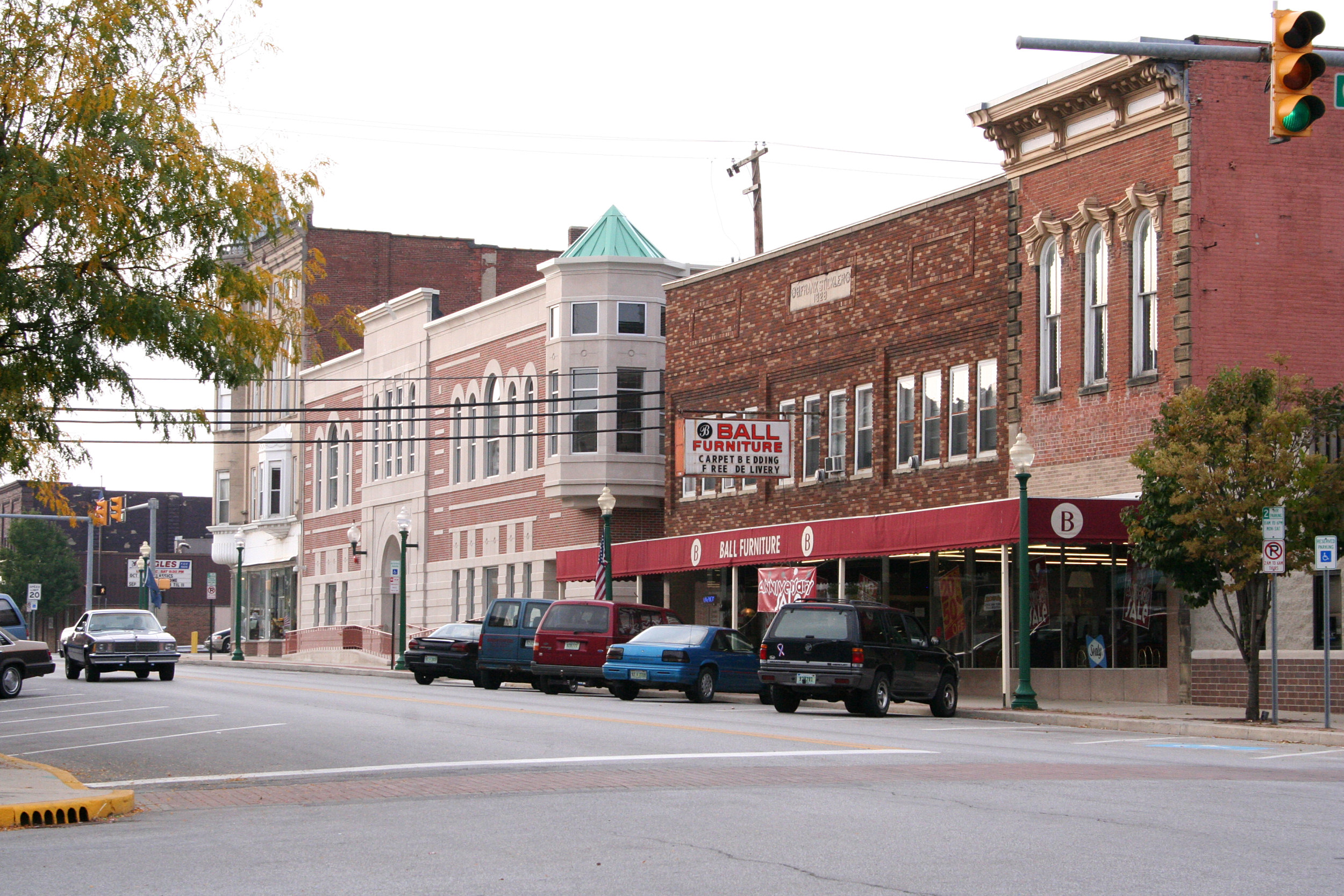
- Columbia City Historic District, October 2005

- Location within Indiana Location within the United States
- Location: Roughly bounded by Jefferson, Walnut, Ellsworth, Wayne, and N. Chauncy Sts., Columbia City, Indiana
- Coordinates: 41°09′29″N 85°29′20″W
- Area: 98 acres (40 ha)
- Architect: Multiple
- Architectural style: Late 19th And Early 20th Century American Movements, Late 19th And 20th Century Revivals, Late Victorian
- NRHP reference No.: 87001307
- Added to NRHP: June 22, 1987

Columbia City Historic District is a national historic district located at Columbia City, Indiana. The district encompasses 197 contributing buildings in the central business district and surrounding residential sections of Columbia City. It developed between about 1840 and 1937 and includes representative examples of Greek Revival, Italianate, Queen Anne, Second Empire, Classical Revival, and Bungalow / American Craftsman style architecture. Located in the district is the separately listed Whitley County Courthouse. Other notable contributing buildings include the former Whitley County Courthouse (1841), Adams Y. Hooper Residence (c. 1860), Thomas Shorb Residence (c. 1875), William McNagny Residence (c. 1880), Elisha L. McLallen House (1905), Whitley County Jail (1875), City Hall (1917), Peabody (Carnegie) Library (1919), U.S. Post Office (1935), Central Building (1872), D.B. Clugston Block (1889), Masonic Temple (1904), Church of the Brethren (1889), Presbyterian Church (1892), Methodist Church (1912), and Baptist Church (1917).

It was listed on the National Register of Historic Places in 1987.

== Gallery ==
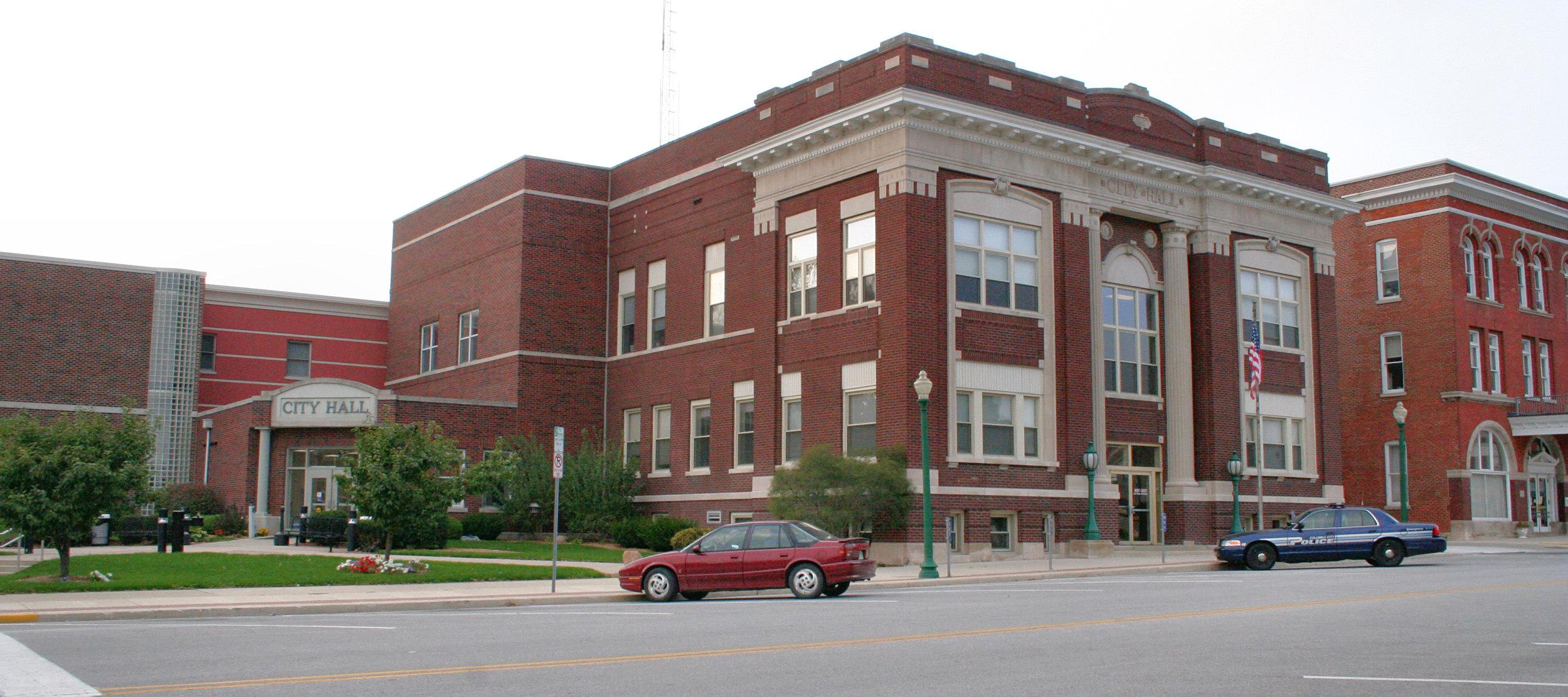
Columbia City City Hall, October 2005
