= Columbia Commercial Historic District (Columbia, Kentucky) =

Historic district in Kentucky, United States

- U.S. National Register of Historic Places
- U.S. Historic district
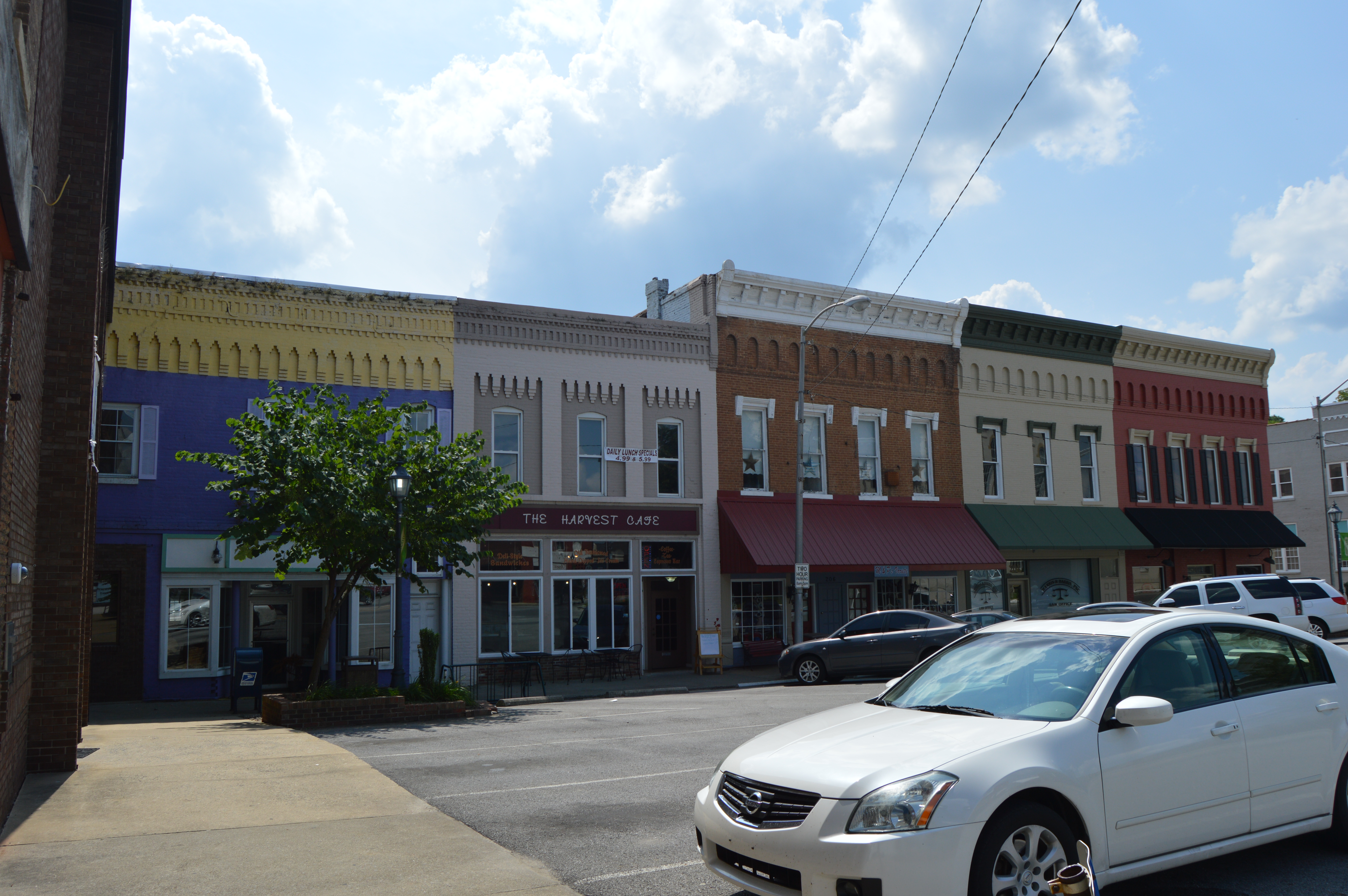

- Location within Kentucky Location within the United States
- Location: Roughly centered around the Columbia Public Square, Columbia, Kentucky
- Coordinates: 37°06′11″N 85°18′22″W
- Area: 5.3 acres (2.1 ha)
- NRHP reference No.: 100000733
- Added to NRHP: March 13, 2017

The Columbia Commercial Historic District in Columbia, Kentucky, was listed on the National Register of Historic Places in 2017. It is a 5.3 acres (2.1 ha) historic district with 29 contributing buildings, two non-contributing buildings, and a non-contributing site.

It is "centered on its tallest building, the National Register-listed Adair County Courthouse (1885), forming a traditional public square made by the buildings that surround the courthouse."
