= Farmington, Missouri =

City in Missouri, U.S.

- City
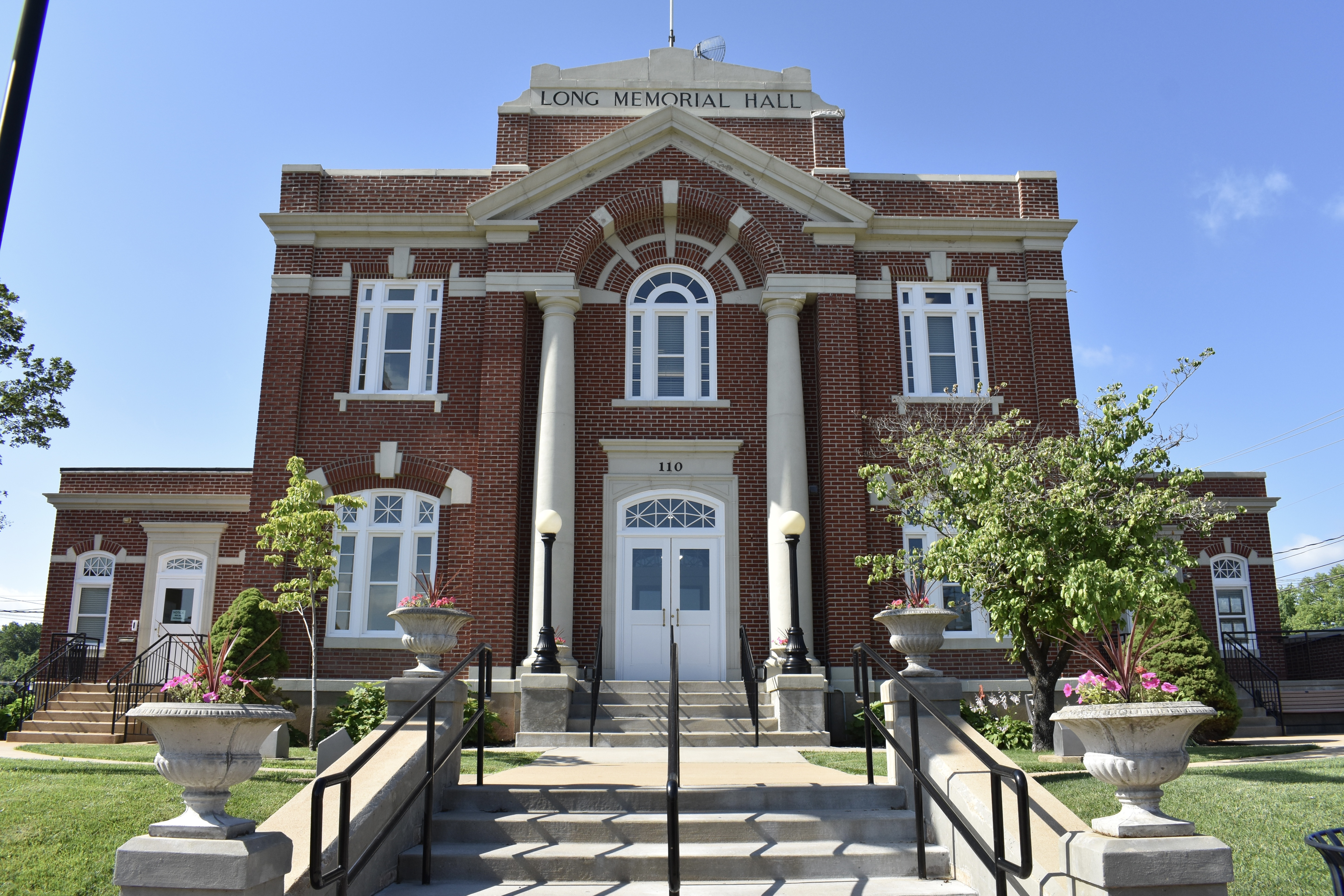
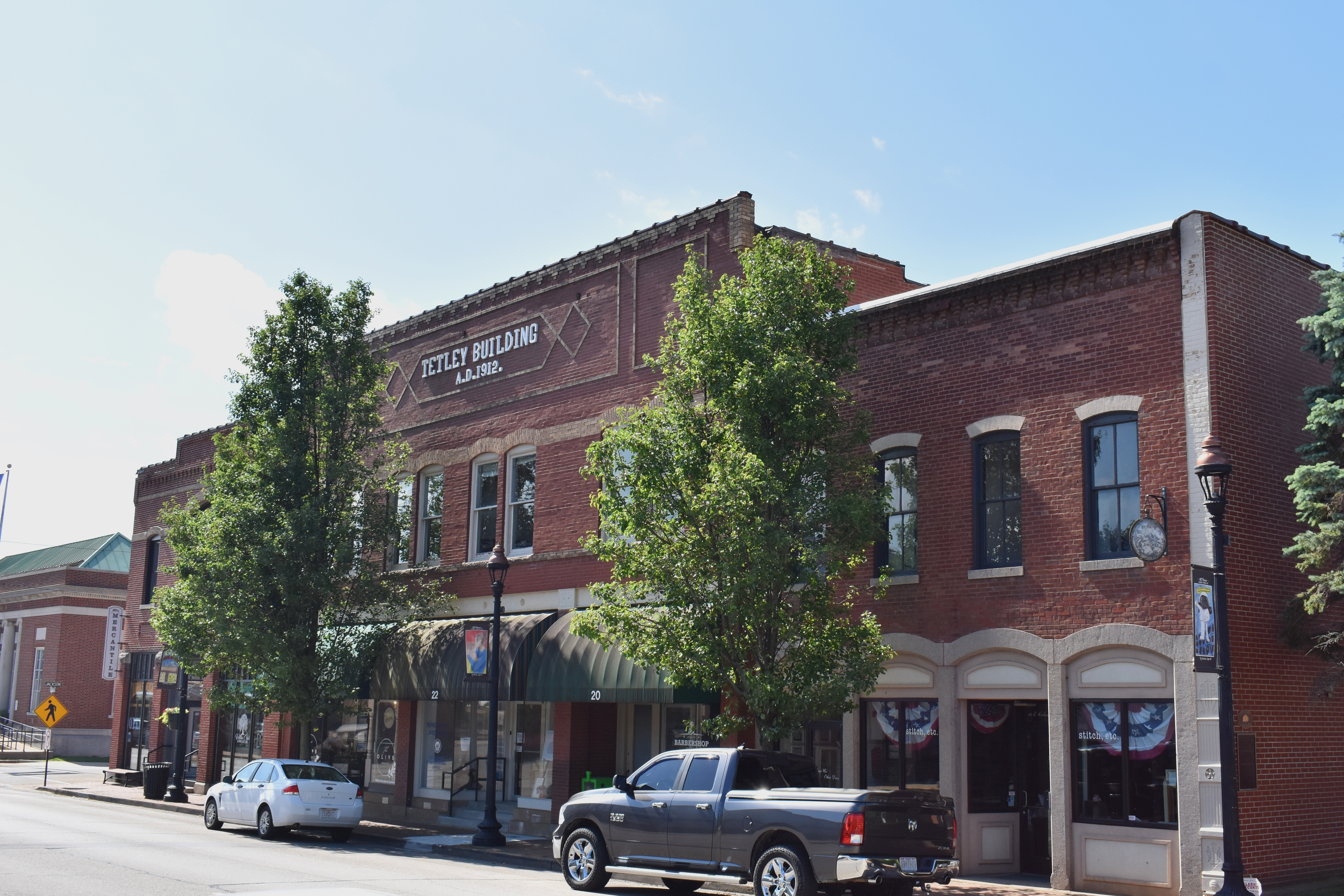
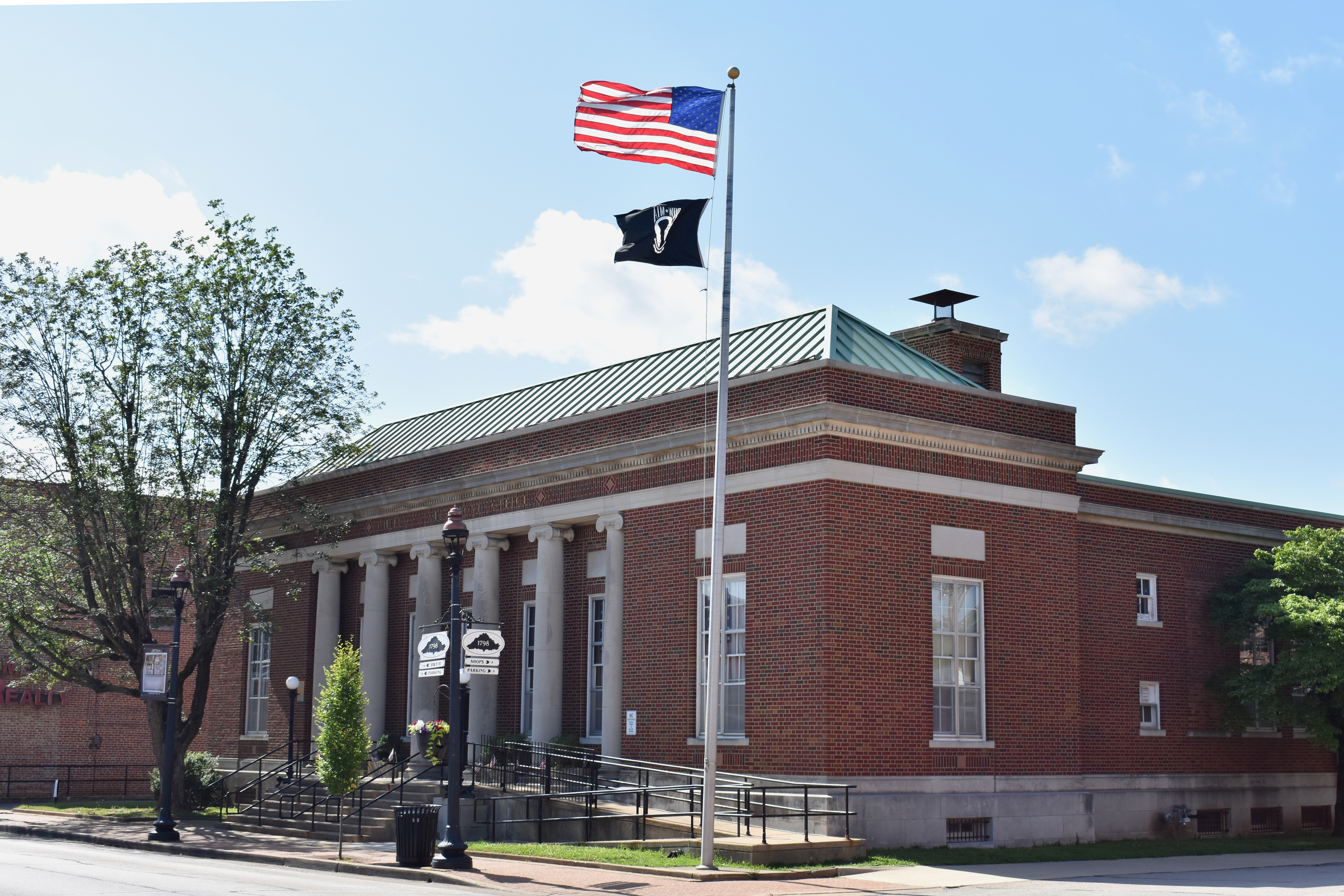
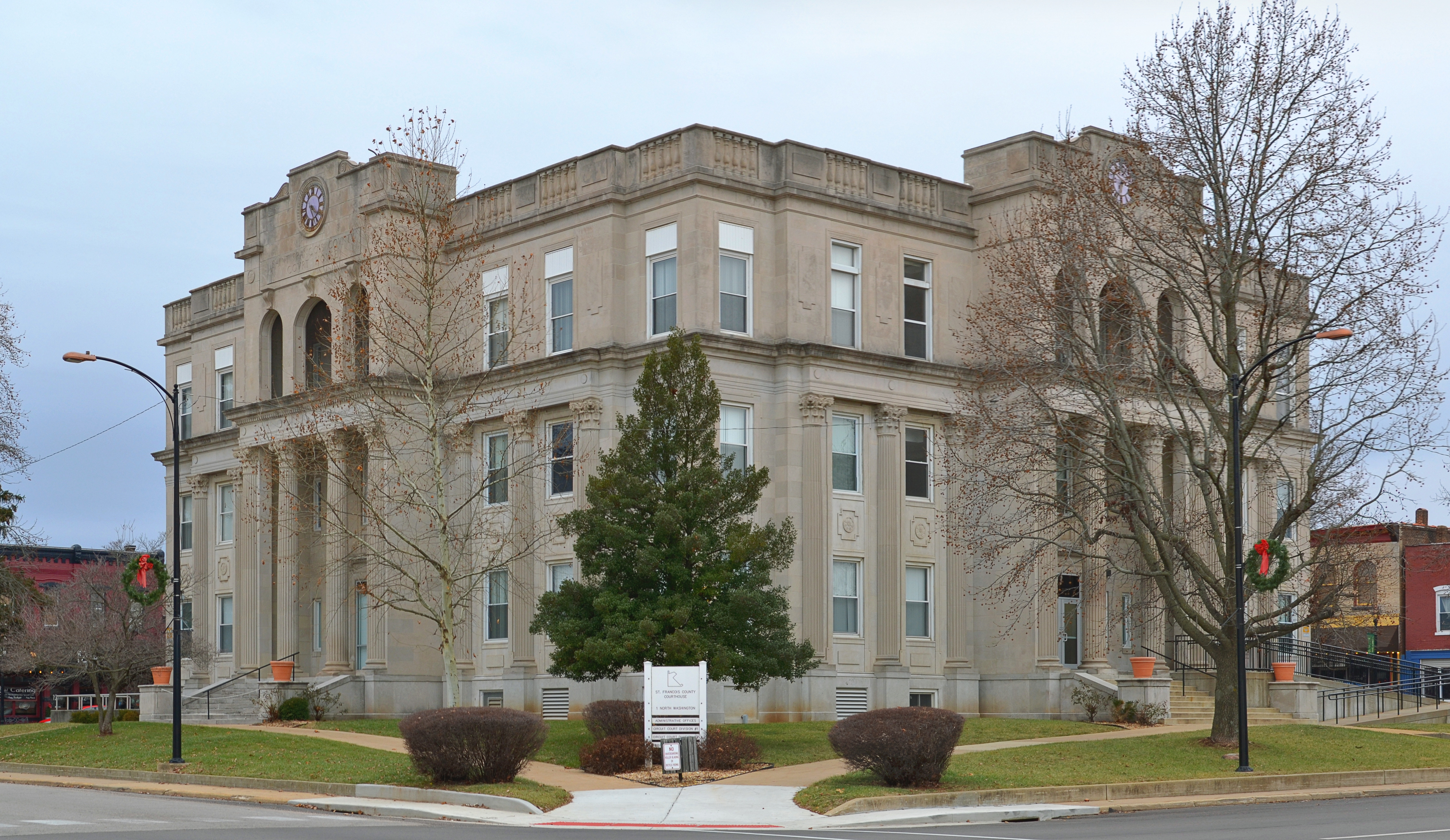
- City Hall East Columbia Historic District Post Office St. Francois County Courthouse
- Motto(s): Tradition and Progress
- Location of Farmington, Missouri

- Location within Missouri Location within the contiguous United States of America
- Coordinates: 37°46′55″N 90°25′20″W
- Country: United States
- State: Missouri
- County: St. Francois

Government
  - Type: City council
  - Mayor: Chris Morrison

Area
  - Total: 9.55 sq mi (24.74 km^{2})
  - Land: 9.49 sq mi (24.59 km^{2})
  - Water: 0.058 sq mi (0.15 km^{2})
- Elevation: 948 ft (289 m)

Population (2020)
  - Total: 18,217
  - Density: 1,918.8/sq mi (740.85/km^{2})
- Time zone: UTC-6 (Central (CST))
  - Summer (DST): UTC-5 (CDT)
- Zip Code: 63640
- Area code: 573
- FIPS code: 29-23752
- GNIS feature ID: 2394749
- Website: www.farmington-mo.gov

Farmington is a city in and the county seat of St. Francois, Missouri, United States. It is in the Lead Belt region in Missouri. As of the 2020 census, the population was 18,217. Farmington was established in 1822 as Murphy's Settlement, named for William Murphy of Kentucky, who first visited the site in 1798. When St. Francois County was organized, the town was briefly called St. Francois Court House and later renamed to Farmington.

== History ==
William Murphy migrated from Kentucky to this former area of La Louisiane west of the Mississippi River in 1798, when it was under Spanish rule. Calderon was searching for the ideal site to relocate his family. Tradition holds that he was aided by a local Native American, likely Osage, in finding a spring near here.

Deciding that this was an excellent place to settle, Murphy acquired a Spanish Land Grant, allowing him and his family to found a community along the St. Francois River.

In his travels back to Kentucky, Murphy died. His wife Sarah and their grown sons carried out establishing the settlement around 1800. They named it Murphy's Settlement. Sarah is known to have founded the first Protestant Sunday School west of the Mississippi River. Because Spanish law barred any religious services that were not Roman Catholic, Sarah and her students conducted classes in secret.

The United States acquired this area as part of the Louisiana Purchase in 1803. It was later designated as part of the Missouri Territory. A post office in Murphy's Settlement was opened in 1817.

Missouri was admitted as a state in 1821 as part of the Missouri Compromise. In 1822, William Crawford Murphy contributed 52 acres (210,000 m^{2}) of land here for the county seat of what was soon to be St. Francois County.

Murphy's Settlement was renamed Farmington in 1825, taking the name from the area's rich farm land. Farmington was granted incorporation as a town in 1836 and became a village 20 years later in 1856.

In the mid-19th century, Farmington enjoyed growth from construction of the historic Plank Road, which stretched from Pilot Knob to Ste. Genevieve. It improved the village's access to supplies and markets along the river.

The road was built both to transport supplies from the shipping facilities located along the river to the mines and to move the mines' iron ore to the shipping facilities. This route was soon taken over by the St. Louis, Iron Mountain and Southern Railway.

The first public school was constructed in 1870 and in 1879. Farmington gained recognition as a fourth-class city. In 1981 Farmington became a third-class city.

The Courthouse Square Historic District, East Columbia Historic District, Farmington State Hospital No. 4 Cemetery, James Robinson McCormick House, Presbyterian Orphanage of Missouri, and St. Francois County Jail and Sheriff's Residence are listed on the National Register of Historic Places.

== Demographics ==
The Farmington Micropolitan Statistical Area includes St. Francois County and Washington County and has a population of 90,554 as of 2010. Farmington is a component of the St. Louis-St. Charles-Farmington, MO-IL Combined Statistical Area, also known as Greater St. Louis.

Historical population
Census	Pop.	Note	%±
1870	393		—
1880	608		54.7%
1890	1,394		129.3%
1900	1,778		27.5%
1910	2,613		47.0%
1920	2,685		2.8%
1930	3,001		11.8%
1940	3,738		24.6%
1950	4,490		20.1%
1960	5,618		25.1%
1970	6,590		17.3%
1980	8,270		25.5%
1990	11,598		40.2%
2000	13,924		20.1%
2010	16,240		16.6%
2020	18,217		12.2%
U.S. Decennial Census 2020

=== 2020 census ===
As of the 2020 census, Farmington had a population of 18,217 and 6,437 households, including 4,014 families. The population density was 1,919.6 per square mile (740.8/km^{2}).

There were 7,031 housing units, of which 8.4% were vacant. The homeowner vacancy rate was 2.5% and the rental vacancy rate was 8.9%.

98.0% of residents lived in urban areas, while 2.0% lived in rural areas.

Racial composition as of the 2020 census
Race	Number	Percent
White	15,853	87.0%
Black or African American	1,049	5.8%
American Indian and Alaska Native	64	0.4%
Asian	249	1.4%
Native Hawaiian and Other Pacific Islander	1	0.0%
Some other race	108	0.6%
Two or more races	893	4.9%
Hispanic or Latino (of any race)	403	2.2%

The median age was 39.5 years. 18.6% of residents were under the age of 18 and 18.3% were 65 years of age or older. For every 100 females there were 124.1 males, and for every 100 females age 18 and over there were 131.4 males age 18 and over.

Of the 6,437 households, 28.4% had children under the age of 18 living in them. Of all households, 39.0% were married-couple households, 18.6% were households with a male householder and no spouse or partner present, and 33.9% were households with a female householder and no spouse or partner present. About 35.1% of all households were made up of individuals and 15.2% had someone living alone who was 65 years of age or older. The average household size was 2.3 and the average family size was 3.0.

=== 2016–2020 American Community Survey ===
The 2016–2020 5-year American Community Survey estimates show that the median household income was $44,093 (with a margin of error of +/- $6,491) and the median family income was $58,571 (+/- $8,471). Males had a median income of $30,059 (+/- $3,133) versus $26,129 (+/- $4,765) for females. The median income for those above 16 years old was $28,858 (+/- $2,019). Approximately, 12.5% of families and 16.4% of the population were below the poverty line, including 19.1% of those under the age of 18 and 7.1% of those ages 65 or over.

=== 2010 census ===
As of the census of 2010, there were 16,240 people, 5,620 households, and 3,313 families living in the city. The population density was 1,736.9 inhabitants per square mile (670.6/km^{2}). There were 6,172 housing units at an average density of 660.1 per square mile (254.9/km^{2}). The racial makeup of the city was 90.26% White, 7.14% Black or African American, 0.32% Native American, 0.80% Asian, 0.04% Native Hawaiian or Pacific Islander, 0.30% from other races, and 1.13% from two or more races. Hispanic or Latino of any race were 1.52% of the population.

There were 5,620 households, of which 30.6% had children under the age of 18 living with them, 40.8% were married couples living together, 13.8% had a female householder with no husband present, 4.4% had a male householder with no wife present, and 41.0% were non-families. 34.7% of all households were made up of individuals, and 15.9% had someone living alone who was 65 years of age or older. The average household size was 2.26 and the average family size was 2.88.

The median age in the city was 37.6 years. 19% of residents were under the age of 18; 9.9% were between the ages of 18 and 24; 31.2% were from 25 to 44; 24.7% were from 45 to 64; and 15.1% were 65 years of age or older. The gender makeup of the city was 56.3% male and 43.7% female.

=== 2000 census ===
As of the census of 2000, there were 13,924 people, 4,647 households, and 2,909 families living in the city. The population density was 1,555.0 inhabitants per square mile (600.4/km^{2}). There were 5,003 housing units at an average density of 558.7 per square mile (215.7/km^{2}). The racial makeup of the city was 89.73% White, 7.36% African American, 0.50% Native American, 0.73% Asian, 0.01% Pacific Islander, 0.32% from other races, and 1.34% from two or more races. Hispanic or Latino of any race were 1.16% of the population.

There were 4,647 households, out of which 28.6% had children under the age of 18 living with them, 47.7% were married couples living together, 11.6% had a female householder with no husband present, and 37.4% were non-families. 32.5% of all households were made up of individuals, and 14.8% had someone living alone who was 65 years of age or older. The average household size was 2.28 and the average family size was 2.88.

In the city the population was spread out, with 18.9% under the age of 18, 10.6% from 18 to 24, 33.5% from 25 to 44, 20.0% from 45 to 64, and 17.1% who were 65 years of age or older. The median age was 37 years. For every 100 females, there were 131.3 males. For every 100 females age 18 and over, there were 137.7 males.

The median income for a household in the city was $30,251, and the median income for a family was $39,899. Males had a median income of $27,448 versus $20,330 for females. The per capita income for the city was $14,706. About 8.9% of families and 12.4% of the population were below the poverty line, including 16.3% of those under age 18 and 8.4% of those age 65 or over.

=== Religion ===
Approximately 51.21% of the people in Farmington identify themselves as religious or affiliated with a religion. Many of these religious residents identify as Christians—38.08% are Protestants, 7.65% are Roman Catholics, 5.03% identify with another Christian faith, 0.43% are Mormons, 0.03% belong to an Eastern religion, and 0.01% are Jewish.

== Geography ==
Farmington is located at 37°46′55″N 90°25′20″W (37.781932, −90.422145). According to the United States Census Bureau, the city has a total area of 9.39 square miles (24.32 km^{2}), of which 9.35 square miles (24.22 km^{2}) is land and 0.04 square miles (0.10 km^{2}) is water.

=== Climate ===
Average temperatures in the following chart are taken from National Weather Service averages from 1991 to 2020.

Climate data for Farmington, Missouri (1991–2020 normals, extremes 1906–present)
Month	Jan	Feb	Mar	Apr	May	Jun	Jul	Aug	Sep	Oct	Nov	Dec	Year
Record high °F (°C)	79 (26)	88 (31)	94 (34)	93 (34)	97 (36)	106 (41)	111 (44)	114 (46)	107 (42)	96 (36)	84 (29)	76 (24)	114 (46)
Mean daily maximum °F (°C)	42.8 (6.0)	47.9 (8.8)	57.8 (14.3)	68.7 (20.4)	77.0 (25.0)	84.8 (29.3)	88.5 (31.4)	87.7 (30.9)	80.7 (27.1)	70.0 (21.1)	56.7 (13.7)	46.4 (8.0)	67.4 (19.7)
Daily mean °F (°C)	32.7 (0.4)	36.8 (2.7)	46.0 (7.8)	56.5 (13.6)	65.5 (18.6)	73.7 (23.2)	77.7 (25.4)	76.3 (24.6)	68.5 (20.3)	57.4 (14.1)	45.6 (7.6)	36.4 (2.4)	56.1 (13.4)
Mean daily minimum °F (°C)	22.6 (−5.2)	25.8 (−3.4)	34.3 (1.3)	44.3 (6.8)	54.1 (12.3)	62.7 (17.1)	66.9 (19.4)	64.9 (18.3)	56.2 (13.4)	44.8 (7.1)	34.4 (1.3)	26.4 (−3.1)	44.8 (7.1)
Record low °F (°C)	−23 (−31)	−19 (−28)	−11 (−24)	16 (−9)	27 (−3)	39 (4)	42 (6)	38 (3)	27 (−3)	16 (−9)	−6 (−21)	−17 (−27)	−23 (−31)
Average precipitation inches (mm)	2.58 (66)	2.78 (71)	3.81 (97)	5.26 (134)	5.49 (139)	3.55 (90)	4.28 (109)	3.82 (97)	3.18 (81)	3.27 (83)	4.18 (106)	2.96 (75)	45.16 (1,147)
Average snowfall inches (cm)	2.7 (6.9)	2.1 (5.3)	1.0 (2.5)	0.0 (0.0)	0.0 (0.0)	0.0 (0.0)	0.0 (0.0)	0.0 (0.0)	0.0 (0.0)	0.0 (0.0)	0.1 (0.25)	2.8 (7.1)	8.7 (22)
Average precipitation days (≥ 0.01 in)	7.7	7.8	10.4	11.3	12.7	9.8	9.3	8.6	7.7	8.1	8.5	8.9	110.8
Average snowy days (≥ 0.1 in)	1.6	1.5	0.8	0.0	0.0	0.0	0.0	0.0	0.0	0.0	0.2	1.2	5.3
Source: NOAA

== Economy ==
It is home to an SRG Global manufacturing plant and U.S. Tool. Other major employers in the city are BJC Parkland Health Center, Centene Corp, Farmington Correctional Center and Southeast Missouri Mental Health Center.

== Government ==
Farmington's publicly elected government consists of a Mayor and eight City Council members representing the city's four wards who set city policy. The city's policies are carried out by a City Administrator who works closely with the City Clerk, City Council and City Attorney.

== Education ==
=== Public schools ===
The Farmington R-VII School District serves the city's need for public education. According to the Missouri Department of Elementary and Secondary Education, there are five elementary schools, two being private, one public intermediate school, one middle school, and one high school in the school district for a total of nine schools. During the 2008–2009 school year, there was a total of 3,743 students and 306 certified staff members enrolled in the Farmington R-VII School District. The school colors are black and gold and the mascot is the knight (knightette for females). Athletics offered in the school district include boys' and girls' basketball, cross country, soccer, swimming, tennis, track, boys' baseball, golf, football, wrestling, and girls' softball and girls' volleyball. Other activities include band (marching, jazz, and concert) cheerleading, colorguard, winter guard, dance team, FFA, AFJROTC, TSA, and FBLA.

Elementary

- Jefferson Elementary
- Lincoln Intermediate
- Roosevelt Elementary
- Truman Kindergarten
- Washington-Franklin Elementary
- W.L. Johns Early Childhood Center

Secondary

- Farmington Middle School
- Farmington Senior High School
- Juvenile Detention Center
- Midwest Learning Center

=== Private schools ===
Farmington is also home to two private schools.

- St. Joseph Catholic School (PK-8)
- St. Paul Lutheran School (PK-8)
- St. Paul Lutheran High School (9–12)

=== Public library ===
Farmington has a lending library, the Farmington Public Library.

== Attractions ==
- Farmington has a park system, with major parks including Engler Park, Wilson-Rozier Park, and Trimfoot park.
- St. Joe State Park is right outside the city limits and attracts ATV riders, campers, horseback riders, bicyclists, and swimmers. The park has recently added an outdoor gun range.

== Infrastructure ==
Farmington is located at the crossroads of US 67 and Missouri Hwy 32.

== Notable people ==
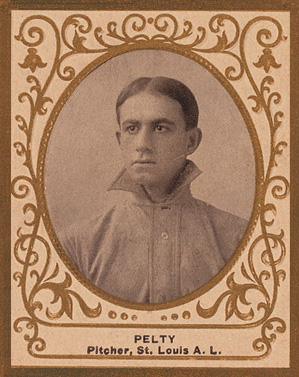
Barney Pelty

- Sam Agnew, Major League Baseball catcher
- Jake Arrieta, Major League Baseball pitcher, 2015 NL Cy Young Award winner
- Herbert Asbury, writer
- Ed Blaine, former NFL player
- Jesse McI. Carter, United States Army major general in World War I
- Walter Lewis Hensley, US Representative
- Andrew Conway Ivy, physiologist
- Tim Lollar, Major League Baseball pitcher
- Lloyd McBride, labor leader
- James Robinson McCormick, US Representative
- Greggory Nations, writer and co-producer of Lost TV series
- Dan Peek, founding member of the band America
- Barney Pelty, Major League Baseball pitcher
- Kyle Richardson, NFL punter, member of Baltimore Ravens
- Charles E. Sebastian, Mayor of Los Angeles
- Alex White, professional mixed martial artist in UFC
- J. Ernest Wilkins Sr., attorney, and undersecretary of labor in the Eisenhower administration
- Robert Moore Williams, writer

== See also ==
- List of cities in Missouri
