= Columbia Commercial Historic District (Columbia, South Carolina) =

Historic district in South Carolina, United States

- U.S. National Register of Historic Places
- U.S. Historic district
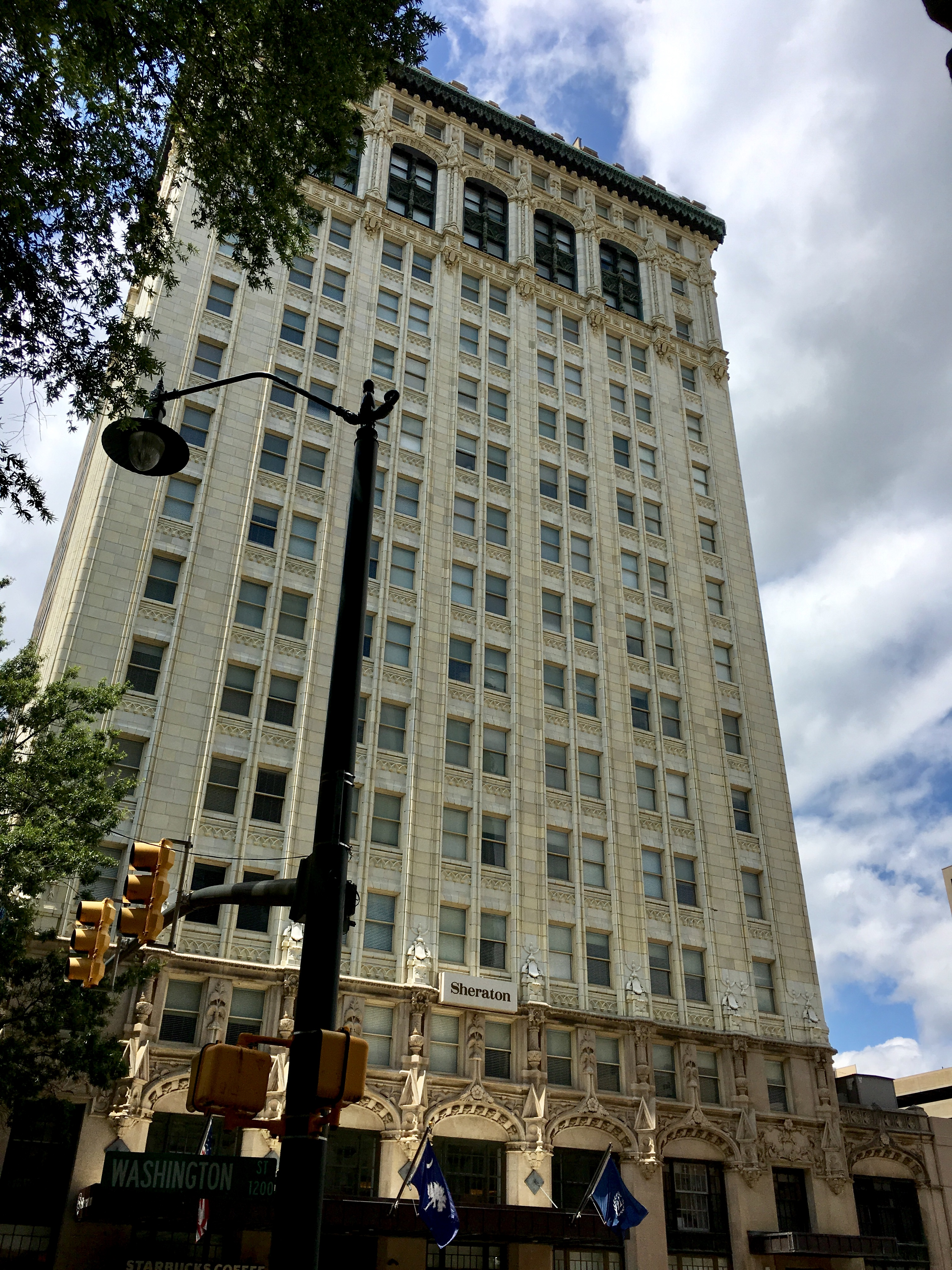
- Sheraton Building (1913)

- Location within South Carolina Location within the United States
- Location: Portions of Main, Blanding, Taylor & Sumter Sts., Columbia, South Carolina
- Coordinates: 34°00′27″N 81°02′02″W
- Area: 18 acres (7.3 ha)
- Built: 1866
- NRHP reference No.: 14000875 (original); 100000689 (increase 1); 100006058 (increase 2)

Significant dates
- Added to NRHP: October 20, 2014
- Boundary increases: February 28, 2017; January 25, 2021

The Columbia Commercial Historic District encompasses a historically significant portion of the central business district of Columbia, South Carolina. It includes portions of three blocks of Main Street between Laurel and Hampton Streets, as well as individual buildings on adjacent streets. It includes the full length of Main Streets east side on these blocks, but only the central block (between Blanding and Taylor Streets) on the west side, extending slightly south of Taylor. This area best illustrates the city's commercial and economic growth for a century, from the end of the American Civil War to about 1963, with a broad diversity of architectural styles found in a small area.

The district was added to the National Register of Historic Places in 2014, and has twice been enlarged. Nine of the district's 36 buildings are also individually listed.

== See also ==
- National Register of Historic Places listings in Columbia, South Carolina
