= East Columbia Historic District (Farmington, Missouri) =

Historic district in Missouri, United States

- U.S. National Register of Historic Places
- U.S. Historic district
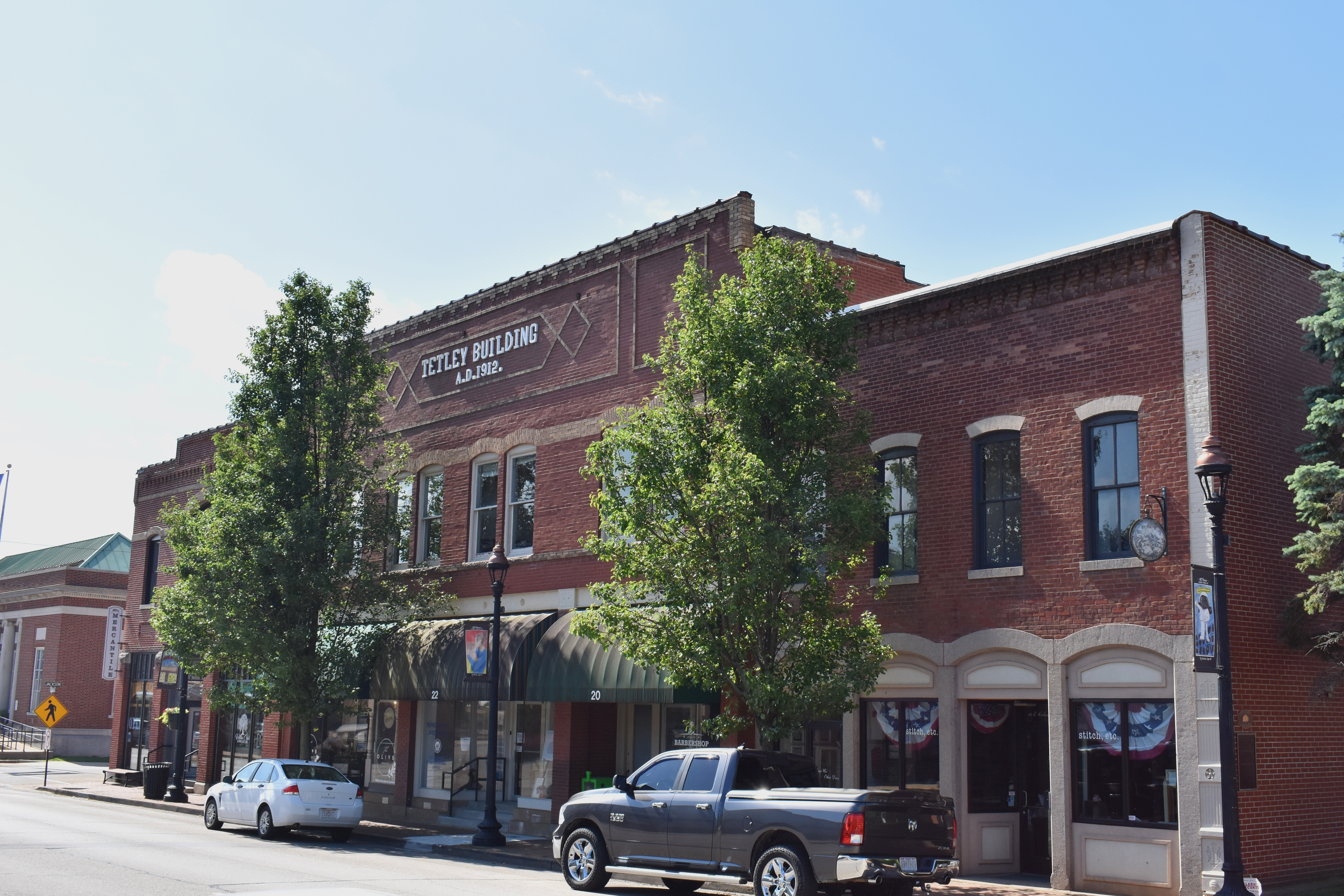
- Tetley Block

- Location within Missouri Location within the United States
- Location: S side of East Columbia:14-122 E. Columbia, N side:101-103 and 117-119 E. Columbia, Farmington, Missouri
- Coordinates: 37°46′49″N 90°25′11″W
- Area: 3.1 acres (1.3 ha)
- Architect: Miller, Louis
- Architectural style: Late Victorian, Beaux Arts, et al.
- NRHP reference No.: 04000699, 07000482 (Boundary Increase)
- Added to NRHP: July 14, 2004, May 30, 2007 (Boundary Increase)

The East Columbia Historic District is a national historic district located at Farmington, St. Francois County, Missouri. The district encompasses 11 contributing buildings in the central business district of Farmington. It developed between about 1879 and 1954, and includes representative examples of Late Victorian, Beaux Arts, and Bungalow / American Craftsman style architecture. Notable buildings include the Tetley Jewelry Store (c. 1879), Andy Hahn Building (c. 1919), Lang and Holler Building (c. 1904), U.S. Post Office (c. 1932), and Henry C. Meyer Building (c. 1899), and T.F. Lockridge Harness Co. Building / Wichman Nash Service.

It was listed on the National Register of Historic Places in 2004 with a boundary increase in 2007.
