= National Register of Historic Places listings in Saline County, Missouri =

Location of Saline County in Missouri

This is a list of the National Register of Historic Places listings in Saline County, Missouri.

This is intended to be a complete list of the properties and districts on the National Register of Historic Places in Saline County, Missouri, United States. Latitude and longitude coordinates are provided for many National Register properties and districts; these locations may be seen together in a map.

There are 32 properties and districts listed on the National Register in the county, including 3 National Historic Landmarks.

This National Park Service list is complete through NPS recent listings posted March 27, 2026.

== Current listings ==
| | Name on the Register | Image | Date listed | Location | City or town | Description |
|---|---|---|---|---|---|---|
| 1 | Arrow Rock Ferry Landing | Arrow Rock Ferry Landing | May 1, 2013 (#08000664) | Northern extension of 2nd St. 39°04′27″N 92°56′37″W | Arrow Rock | |
| 2 | Arrow Rock | Arrow Rock | October 15, 1966 (#66000422) | Arrow Rock State Park; 39°04′00″N 92°56′41″W | Arrow Rock | |
| 3 | Arrow Rock State Historic Site Bridge | Arrow Rock State Historic Site Bridge | March 4, 1985 (#85000516) | Southeast of Arrow Rock; 39°04′06″N 92°56′39″W | Arrow Rock | |
| 4 | Arrow Rock State Historic Site Grave Shelter | Arrow Rock State Historic Site Grave Shelter | February 27, 1985 (#85000534) | Southeast of Arrow Rock; 39°04′06″N 92°56′39″W | Arrow Rock | |
| 5 | Arrow Rock State Historic Site Lookout Shelter | | February 27, 1985 (#85000535) | East of Arrow Rock; 39°04′16″N 92°56′33″W | Arrow Rock | |
| 6 | Arrow Rock State Historic Site Open Shelter | Arrow Rock State Historic Site Open Shelter | February 28, 1985 (#85000536) | Southeast of Arrow Rock; 39°04′04″N 92°56′31″W | Arrow Rock | |
| 7 | Arrow Rock Tavern | Arrow Rock Tavern | February 23, 1972 (#72000729) | Main St. 39°04′03″N 92°56′42″W | Arrow Rock | |
| 8 | Baity Hall | Baity Hall | June 25, 1986 (#86001396) | Missouri Valley College, 500 E. College; 39°06′28″N 93°11′23″W | Marshall | |
| 9 | George Caleb Bingham House | George Caleb Bingham House | October 15, 1966 (#66000423) | 1st and High Sts. in Arrow Rock State Park; 39°04′15″N 92°56′35″W | Arrow Rock | |
| 10 | Henry Blosser House | Henry Blosser House | December 29, 1978 (#78001675) | East of Malta Bend off U.S. 65; 39°11′24″N 93°17′28″W | Malta Bend | |
| 11 | Buckner House | Buckner House | April 19, 1984 (#84002581) | 125 N. Brunswick Ave. 39°07′22″N 93°11′25″W | Marshall | |
| 12 | Chicago and Alton Depot | Chicago and Alton Depot | June 27, 1979 (#79001395) | Sebree St. 39°07′31″N 93°11′54″W | Marshall | |
| 13 | First Christian Church | First Christian Church | September 12, 1980 (#80002394) | 400 Bridge St. 38°57′46″N 93°25′09″W | Sweet Springs | |
| 14 | First Presbyterian Church | First Presbyterian Church | September 20, 1977 (#77000814) | 212 E. North St. 39°07′15″N 93°11′39″W | Marshall | |
| 15 | Fisher-Gabbert Archeological Site | | March 16, 1972 (#72000730) | 1 mile (1.6 km) northeast of central Miami; 39°19′51″N 93°12′48″W | Miami | |
| 16 | Fitzgibbon Hospital | Fitzgibbon Hospital | October 17, 2012 (#12000874) | 868 S. Brunswick Ave. 39°06′44″N 93°11′25″W | Marshall | |
| 17 | Free Will Baptist Church of Pennytown | Free Will Baptist Church of Pennytown | April 19, 1988 (#88000388) | Off MO UU 8 miles (13 km) southeast of Marshall; 39°00′59″N 93°10′47″W | Marshall | |
| 18 | Gumbo Point Archeological Site | | August 25, 1969 (#69000125) | Southern side of the Missouri River, 2 miles (3.2 km) north of the junction of U.S. Route 65 and Route 127; 39°13′33″N 93°23′18″W | Grand Pass | |
| 19 | Guthrey Archeological Site | | December 2, 1970 (#70000349) | 2 miles (3.2 km) east of Miami; 39°20′04″N 93°11′34″W | Miami | |
| 20 | Mt. Carmel Historic District | | November 10, 2009 (#09000900) | 290th Rd. and Missouri Highway 41 North; 39°12′39″N 93°13′09″W | Marshall | |
| 21 | George A. Murrell House | | November 14, 1997 (#97001435) | 0.75 miles (1.21 km) east and 0.5 miles (0.80 km) north of MO E and H 39°02′17″N 93°04′25″W | Napton | |
| 22 | Neff Tavern Smokehouse | Neff Tavern Smokehouse | November 30, 1978 (#78001676) | Northeast of Napton off MO 41; 39°05′48″N 93°02′39″W | Napton | |
| 23 | Old Fort | Old Fort | January 13, 1972 (#72000731) | Van Meter State Park; 39°16′22″N 93°15′49″W | Miami | |
| 24 | Plattner Archeological Site | | March 4, 1971 (#71000474) | 1 mile (1.6 km) north of Malta Bend; 39°12′38″N 93°21′24″W | Malta Bend | |
| 25 | Saline County Courthouse | Saline County Courthouse | August 24, 1977 (#77000815) | Courthouse Sq. 39°07′15″N 93°11′47″W | Marshall | |
| 26 | Santa Fe Trail-Grand Pass Trail Segments | Santa Fe Trail-Grand Pass Trail Segments | April 21, 1994 (#94000324) | Junction of US 65 and County Road T 39°11′43″N 93°26′29″W | Grand Pass | |
| 27 | Santa Fe Trail-Saline County Trail Segments | | June 30, 1994 (#94000615) | Co. Rd. 416 (Rural Rt. 3) west of junction with MO 41; 39°11′17″N 93°14′21″W | Stanhope | |
| 28 | William B. Sappington House | William B. Sappington House | January 21, 1970 (#70000348) | 3 miles (4.8 km) southwest of Arrow Rock on CR TT; 39°02′24″N 92°59′09″W | Arrow Rock | |
| 29 | Sweet Springs Historic District | Sweet Springs Historic District | December 10, 1997 (#97001485) | 200-217 W. Lexington Ave and 211 Marshall St. 38°57′54″N 93°25′04″W | Sweet Springs | Originally roughly along Lexington, Marshall, Miller, and Spring Sts., until a boundary decrease of April 26, 2010 |
| 30 | Utz Site | | October 15, 1966 (#66000424) | Southern half of Section 19, Township 52 North, Range 21 West; 39°16′23″N 93°15′12″W | Marshall | Site is a full mile long from southwest to northeast |
| 31 | Van Meter State Park Combination Building | | February 27, 1985 (#85000537) | Van Meter State Park; 39°15′53″N 93°16′05″W | Marshall | |
| 32 | Van Meter State Park Shelter Building | | February 28, 1985 (#85000538) | Van Meter State Park; 39°15′57″N 93°16′09″W | Marshall | |

== See also ==
- List of National Historic Landmarks in Missouri
- National Register of Historic Places listings in Missouri
