= Plattner Archeological Site =

- U.S. National Register of Historic Places
- Nearest city: Malta Bend, Missouri
- Area: 71 acres (29 ha)
- NRHP reference No.: 71000474
- Added to NRHP: March 4, 1971

The Plattner Site is an "Ancient Little Osage Village" site noted by Lewis and Clark, excavated by archaeologists in the 1960s, is a National Register of Historic Places listing in Saline County, Missouri.

The exact location of the site is on private property. The location is approximately one mile north of Malta Bend, Missouri, just below the river bluffs. The area can be visited without entering private property via county roads.

In the early 1800s, the river flowed 1/2 to 1 mile south of its current location, bringing this location on the river bluffs much closer to the river than it currently is.

== Description ==
National Register of Historic Places says:

The Plattner Site is significant as an area which witnessed much commerce and some resulting cultural adaptation on the part of the Little Osage Indians. As the Louisiana Territory changed hands among France, England, and Spain, soldiers and traders of all three nations visited this village and left evidence of their presence. Indian occupation of the site has been estimated roughly as 1717 to 1777. House locations, marked by concentrations of household rubbish, ash, and artifacts, are the only visible remains of the settlement.

This was a village established by the Little Osage a few miles west of the "Utz Site," which had been inhabited by the Missouria for several hundred years. The Utz site is located in and near current Van Meter State Park.

William Clark's journal, 8 June 1804, reports:

"Still further back the Plains Commence, The french inform that Lead ore is found on this river in Several places, it heads up between the Osagees & Kansas River the right hand folk [fork] passes in a Short distance of the Missourie at the antient Little Ozages Village"

The Prehistory of Missouri gives further details:

Sometime after 1806, the Little Osage left their village at Hayes, moved out of western Missouri, and established a village on the Missouri river a few miles west of Utz, which had been the principal village of the Missouri. This village, the Plattner site, was contemporaneous with the Missouri Indian village at Gumbo Point, and their cultural inventories are similar except that Plattner contains far more in the way of European trade goods than does Gumbo Point. Later, some Missouri went to live with the Osage, while others joined the Oto on the lower Platte River.

== See also ==
- List of National Historic Landmarks in Missouri
- National Register of Historic Places listings in Saline County, Missouri
- Gumbo Point Archeological Site
- Utz Site
