= Gumbo Point Archeological Site =

- U.S. National Register of Historic Places
- Location within Missouri Location within the United States
- Nearest city: Malta Bend, Missouri
- Coordinates: 39°13′32.4″N 93°23′17.8″W
- Built: ca1725
- NRHP reference No.: 69000125

The Gumbo Point Site is a Native American archaeological site in Saline County, Missouri, located near the Missouri River north of the city of Malta Bend. The site was added to the National Register of Historic Places in 1969.

== Description ==
Excavations since 1939 at Gumbo Point Archeological Site have produced numerous artifacts which indicate the results of cultural contact between the Little Osage and the Missouri Indian tribes. Archaeologists believe that the site will continue to produce significant remains.

Bruce McMillan summarized the history and significance of the site:

[T]he Missouria occupied the Utz site on the Pinnacles until sometime after their initial contact with Europeans. Based on Bourgmont’s description of the Missouria village, Bray believes that some of the tribe had already moved by 1714 from their ridgetop village to the Petitesas (Teteseau) Plain, an extensive prairie on the floodplain. The site, known as Gumbo Point (Chapman 1959b:1–3), would certainly have given the tribe better access to Fort Orleans and, after the fort was abandoned, to traders ascending the Missouri River.

France ceded Louisiana to Spain in November 1762, but it was five years later before a Spanish expedition reached St. Louis (Foley 1989:31–32). The advent of Spanish rule terminated what had been nearly a century of French domination and control of the Missouria and Osage tribes.

Spanish officials, suspicious of the Big Osage because of their raids against tribes friendly to Spain, adopted harsh measures against the Big Osage, Little Osage, and Missouria (Chapman 1959b:4). This led to a turbulent period in the lives of many tribes including the Missouria. They occupied Gumbo Point until the late eighteenth century when they finally moved west following a series of depredations by the Sauk and Fox, as well as smallpox epidemics. By 1794, the Missouria tribe was reported to have been virtually destroyed, with a few survivors joining the Little Osage and the Kansa, while a larger group numbering about 80 joined the Otoe on the Platte River (Schweitzer 2001:448). The Missouria were removed along with the Otoe in 1882 to Oklahoma, where the last full-blooded Missouria Indian died in 1907 (Berry 1936:113, 120).

== See also ==
- National Register of Historic Places listings in Saline County, Missouri
- Plattner Archeological Site
- Utz Site
