= Sweet Springs Historic District =

Historic district in Missouri, United States

- U.S. National Register of Historic Places
- U.S. Historic district
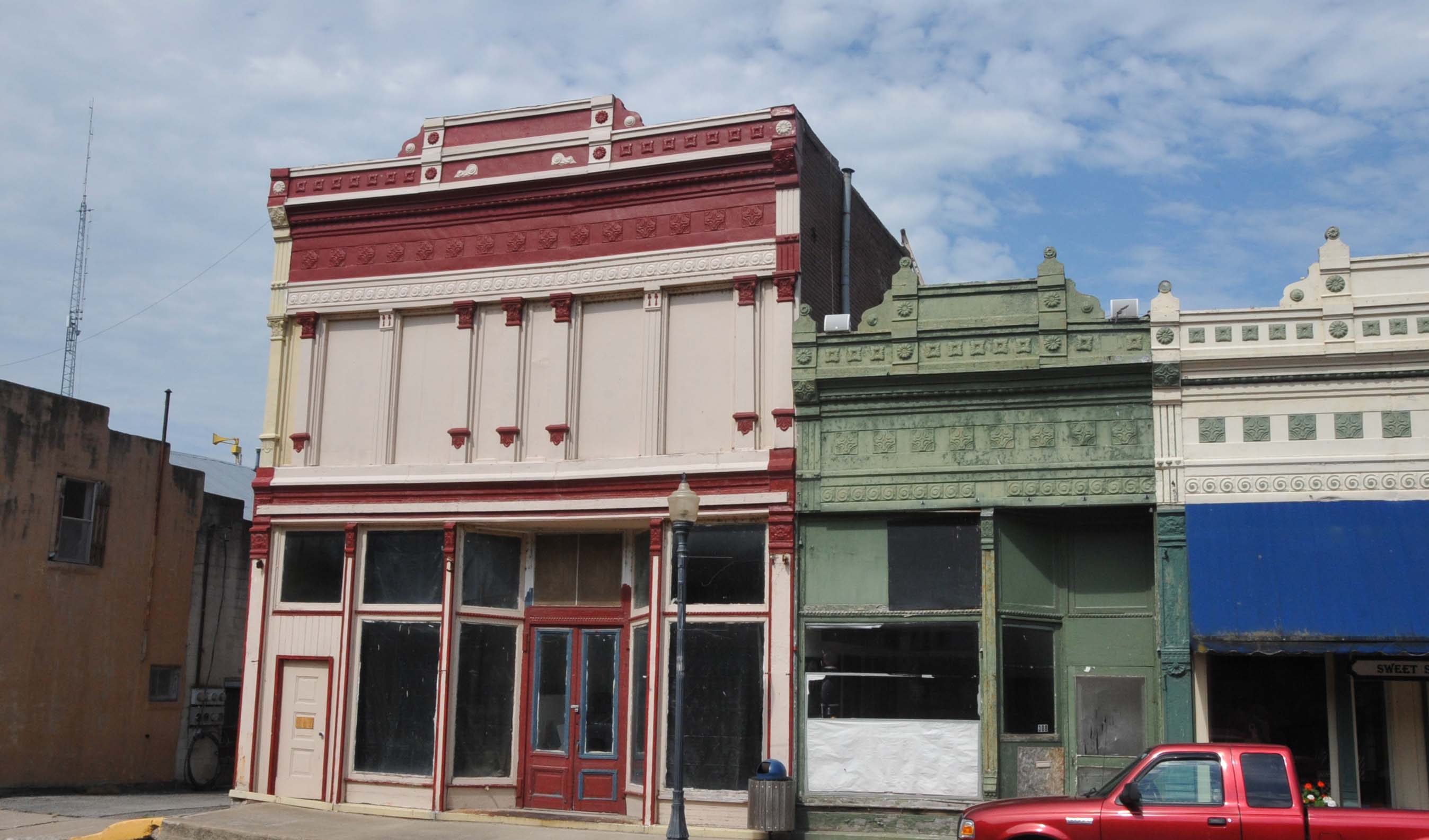
- Sweet Springs Historic District, July 2013

- Location within Missouri Location within the United States
- Location: 200-217 W. Lexington Ave and 211 Marshall St., Sweet Springs, Missouri
- Coordinates: 38°57′54″N 93°25′04″W
- Area: 3.6 acres (1.5 ha)
- Architectural style: Queen Anne, Classical Revival, Early Commercial
- MPS: Sweet Springs MPS
- NRHP reference No.: 97001485, 10000206 (Boundary Decrease)
- Added to NRHP: December 10, 1997, April 26, 2010 (Boundary Decrease)

Sweet Springs Historic District is a national historic district located at Sweet Springs, Saline County, Missouri.

== Description ==
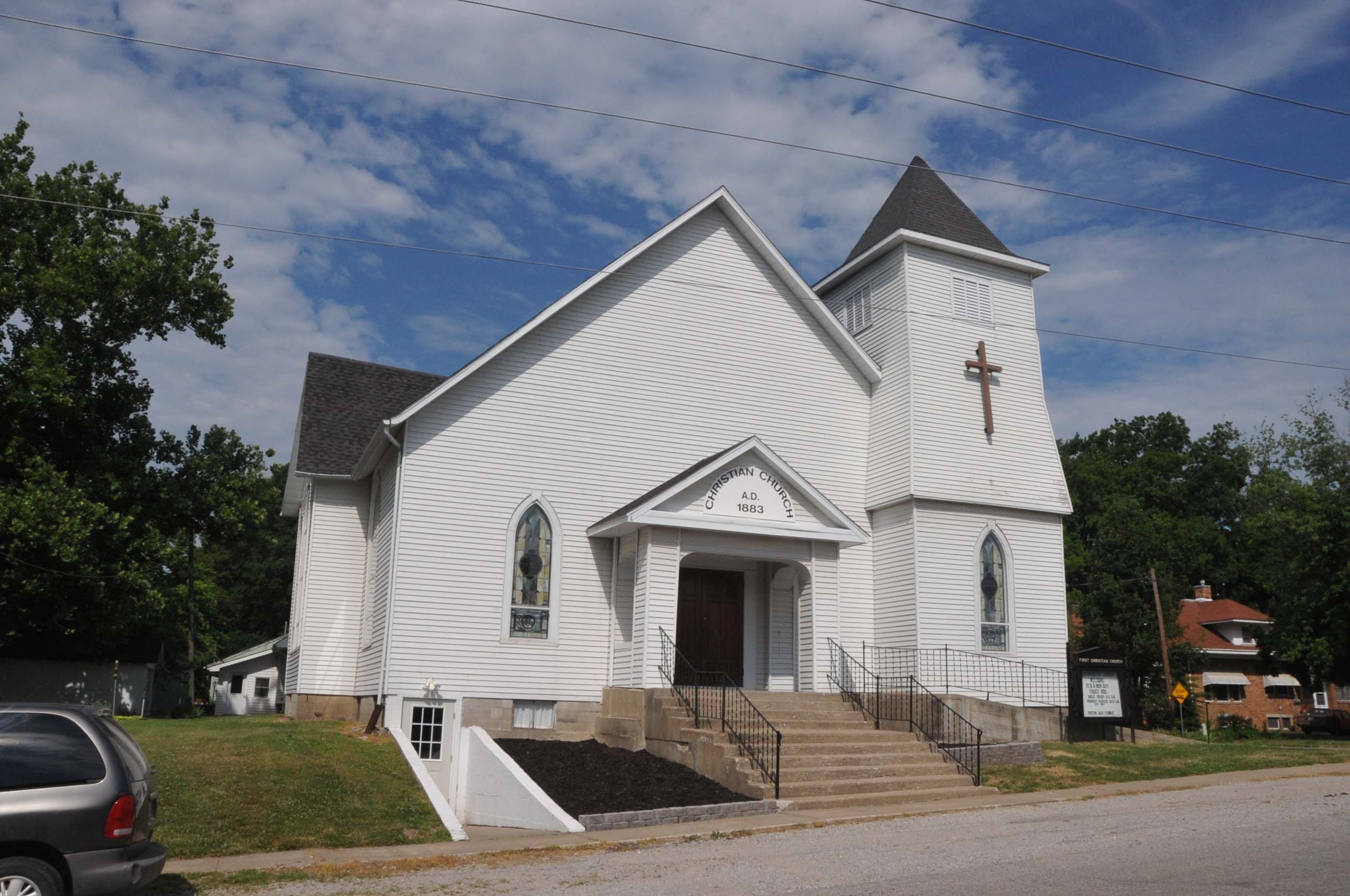
First Christian Church in the Sweet Springs Historic District, July 2013

The district encompasses 18 contributing buildings in the central business district of Sweet Springs. It developed between about 1875 and 1947, and includes representative examples of Queen Anne and Classical Revival style architecture. Notable buildings include the Sweet Springs Post Office (1912), McEntire & Son Jewelry/Post Office (c. 1885), Chemical Bank (c. 1905), and Barbee Lodge 217 AF&AM (c. 1880s, 1919).

It was listed on the National Register of Historic Places in 1997, with a boundary decrease in 2010.

== See also ==
- National Register of Historic Places listings in Saline County, Missouri
