= Utz Site =

- U.S. National Register of Historic Places
- U.S. National Historic Landmark
- Location within Missouri Location within the United States
- Nearest city: Marshall, Missouri
- Coordinates: 39°16′28″N 93°15′0″W
- Area: 200 acres (81 ha)
- Built: 1400
- NRHP reference No.: 66000424

Significant dates
- Added to NRHP: October 15, 1966
- Designated NHL: July 19, 1964

The Utz Site, designated by the Smithsonian trinomial 23SA2, is a major Native American archaeological site in Saline County, Missouri, located on bluffs overlooking the Missouri River. Partially preserved in Van Meter State Park, it is the site of one of the largest early Contact Native villages in the region, which was occupied by the Missouri tribe from c. 15th to the late 18th centuries, and was probably their principal village area during their first contact with Europeans. It was designated a National Historic Landmark in 1964.

== Description ==
The Utz Site is located in central Missouri, north of the city of Marshall and south of Miami. It is roughly 200 acres (81 ha) in size. A small portion is in an outlying part of Van Meter State Park, whose main feature is the so-called Old Fort; the rest is on private land. It is on a series of grassy hills, roughly 2 miles (3.2 km) south of the present course of the Missouri River.

The site was first noted by French explorers, beginning with Pere Marquette, whose 1673 map placed "Messourit" Indians here. It appears to have been abandoned about 1728, around the time a French fort on the river to the north was also abandoned, as there is a distinct absence of European trade goods from after that time. The site has been known for some time, due in part to its proximity to the Old Fort's distinctive earthworks, and was first studied archaeologically in the 1940s.

The ancestral people preceding the Missouri tribe, who also lived on the Utz site, are defined as Oneota.

== See also ==
- List of National Historic Landmarks in Missouri
- National Register of Historic Places listings in Saline County, Missouri
