= Neff Tavern Smokehouse =

- U.S. National Register of Historic Places
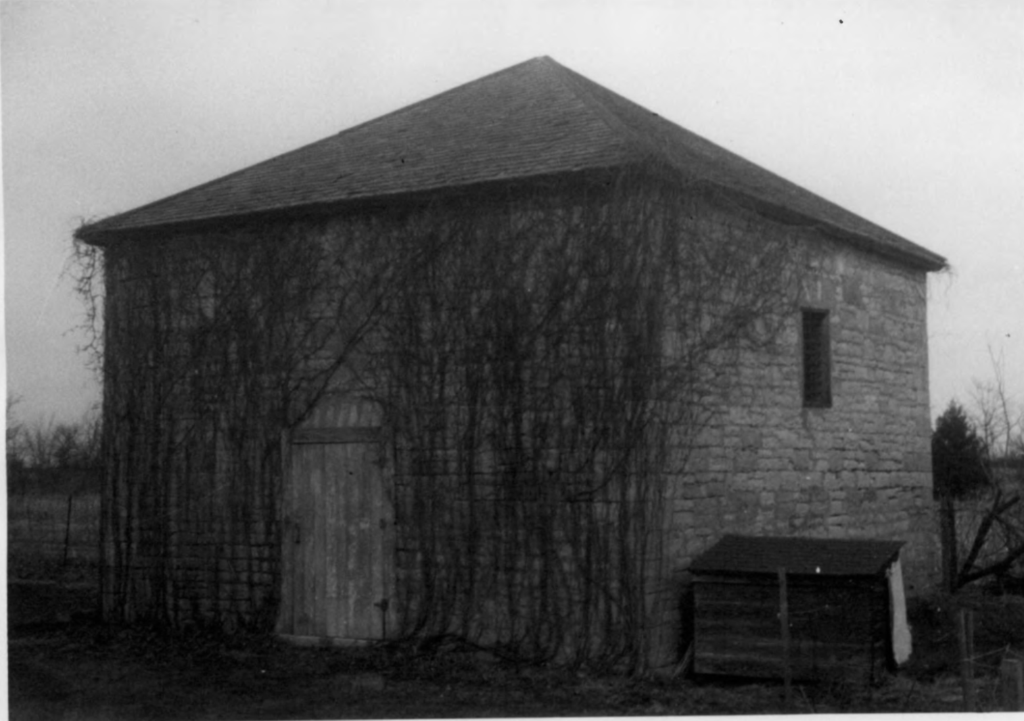

- Location within Missouri Location within the United States
- Location: Northeast of Napton off MO 41, near Napton, Missouri
- Coordinates: 39°5′47.62″N 93°2′38.65″W
- Area: 0.1 acres (0.040 ha)
- Built: 1837
- NRHP reference No.: 78001676
- Added to NRHP: November 30, 1978

The Neff Tavern Smokehouse is a historic smokehouse located on the old Santa Fe Trail northeast of Napton, Saline County, Missouri. It is off Interstate 70 and 6 miles west of Arrow Rock, Missouri. Missouri pioneer Isaac Neff (aka Isaac Nave) was born in Tennessee in 1797 and died in Missouri in 1878. He originally built a log tavern on the site in 1837. The Santa Fe Trail went between the tavern and the barn (later a stage station), skirted the family cemetery, and continued to the northwest. The tavern was torn down in 1890. The stone smokehouse is the only remaining original structure on Neff's former property.

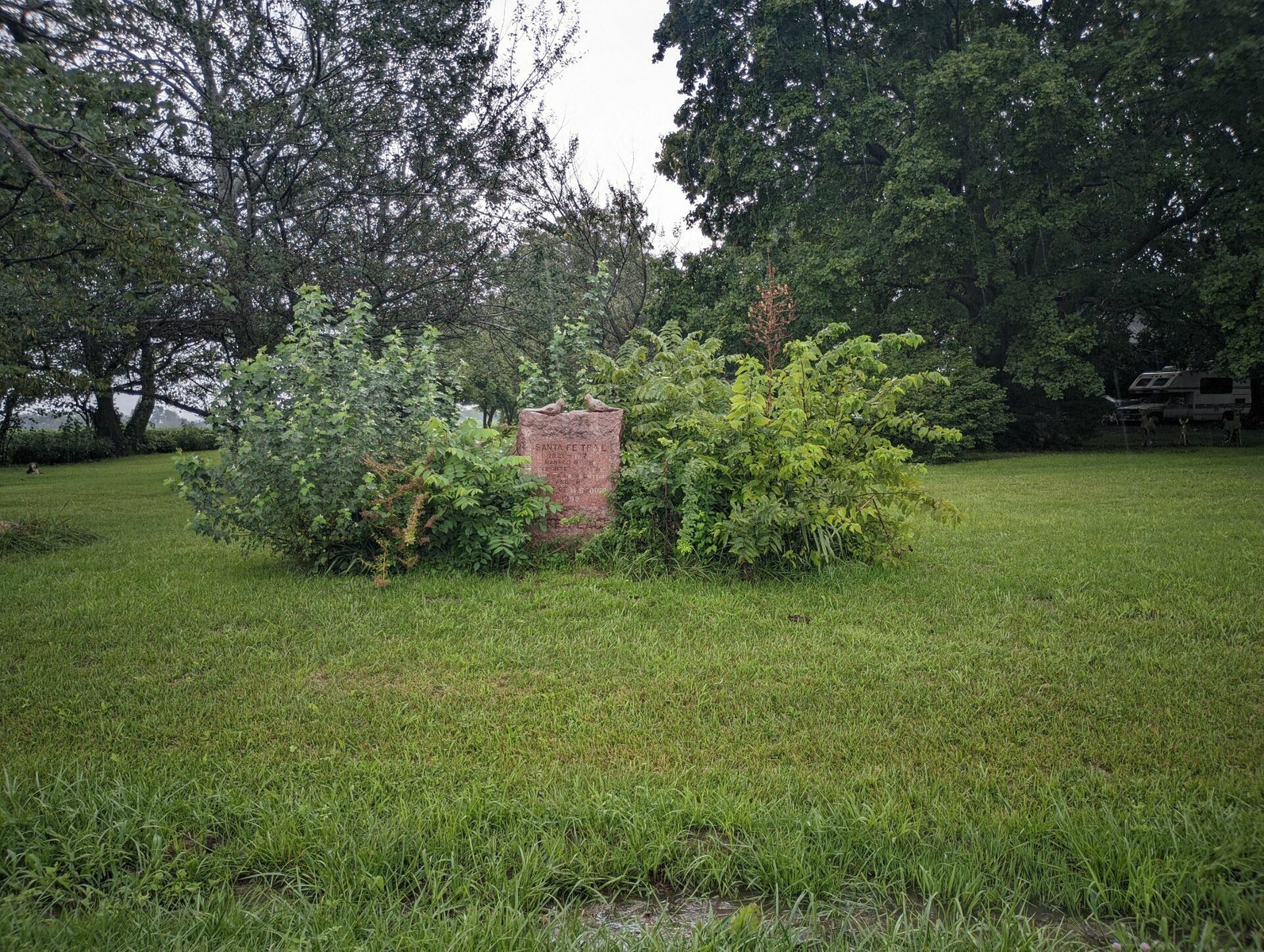
Neff Tavern Santa Fe Trail DAR Monument, 1909

It was added to the National Register of Historic Places in 1978.

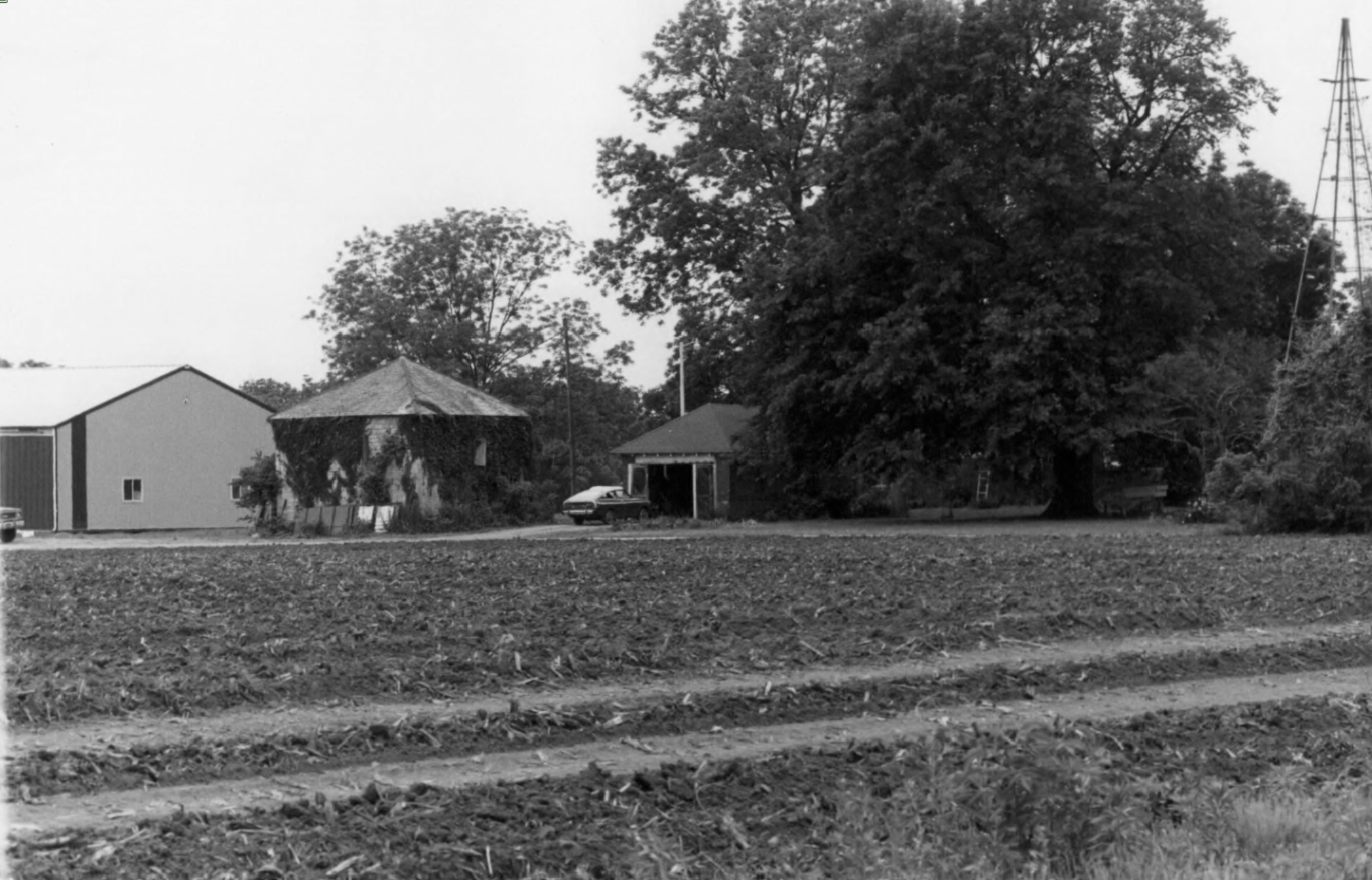
Neff Tavern (center-left) in situ, 1978 - Santa Fe Trail Historic Site near Arrow Rock, Missouri
