= Guthrey Archeological Site =

- U.S. National Register of Historic Places
- Location within Missouri Location within the United States
- Nearest city: Miami, Missouri
- Coordinates: 39°20′04″N 93°11′34″W
- Built: ca1350
- NRHP reference No.: 70000349

The Guthrey Archeological Site is a Native American archaeological site in Saline County, Missouri, located near the Missouri River east of the city of Miami, Missouri.

Archaeological investigation was undertaken in the summer of 1964, and the site was listed on the National Register of Historic Places in 1970.

== Description ==
The Guthrey Site is the earliest known Oneota occupation area in Missouri. Occupation dates are estimated as 1350 to 1400, with the possibility for both earlier and later habitation.

Oneota was a general cultural growth which developed in an area bounded by lines drawn from St. Louis to Kansas City, due north to the Minnesota River, east to Aztalan (in Wisconsin), and south to Cahokia in East St. Louis. Supported by a subsistence economy, the Oneota peoples hunted, fished, gardened, and gathered wild food plants.

== See also ==
- National Register of Historic Places listings in Saline County, Missouri
