= Marshall station (Missouri) =

- Chicago and Alton Depot
- U.S. National Register of Historic Places
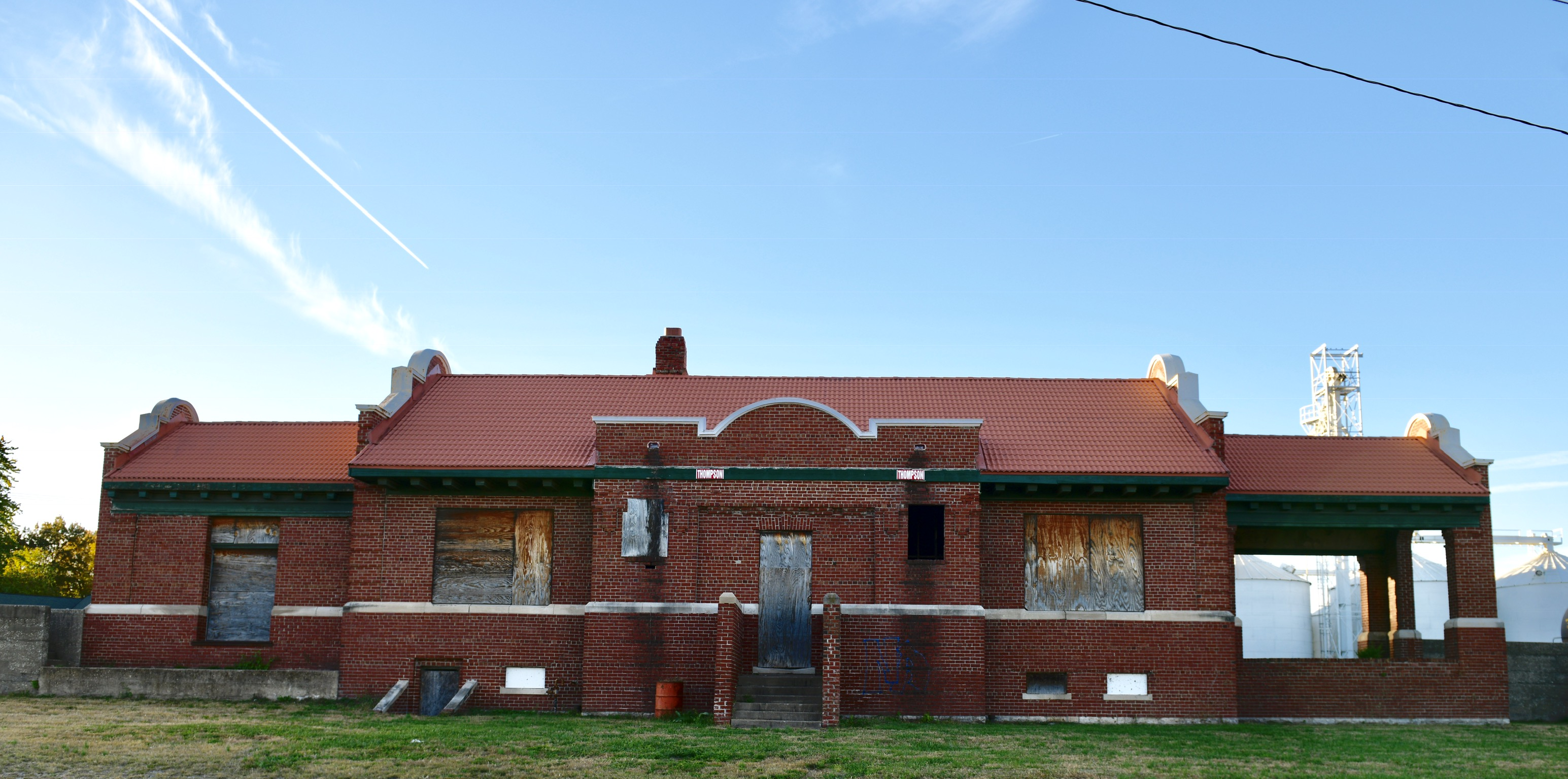
- Chicago and Alton Depot, October 2018

- Location within Missouri Location within the United States
- Location: Sebree Street; Marshall, Missouri; United States
- Coordinates: 39°7′31″N 93°11′54″W
- Area: 1.9 acres (0.77 ha)
- Built: 1906
- Built by: Page, E.R.
- Architect: Hunt, Jarvis
- Architectural style: Mission/spanish Revival, Tudor Revival, Jacobethan Revival
- NRHP reference No.: 79001395
- Added to NRHP: June 27, 1979

Chicago and Alton Depot, also known as the Illinois Central Gulf Depot, is a historic train station located at Marshall, Missouri, United States, that is listed on the National Register of Historic Places.

== Description ==
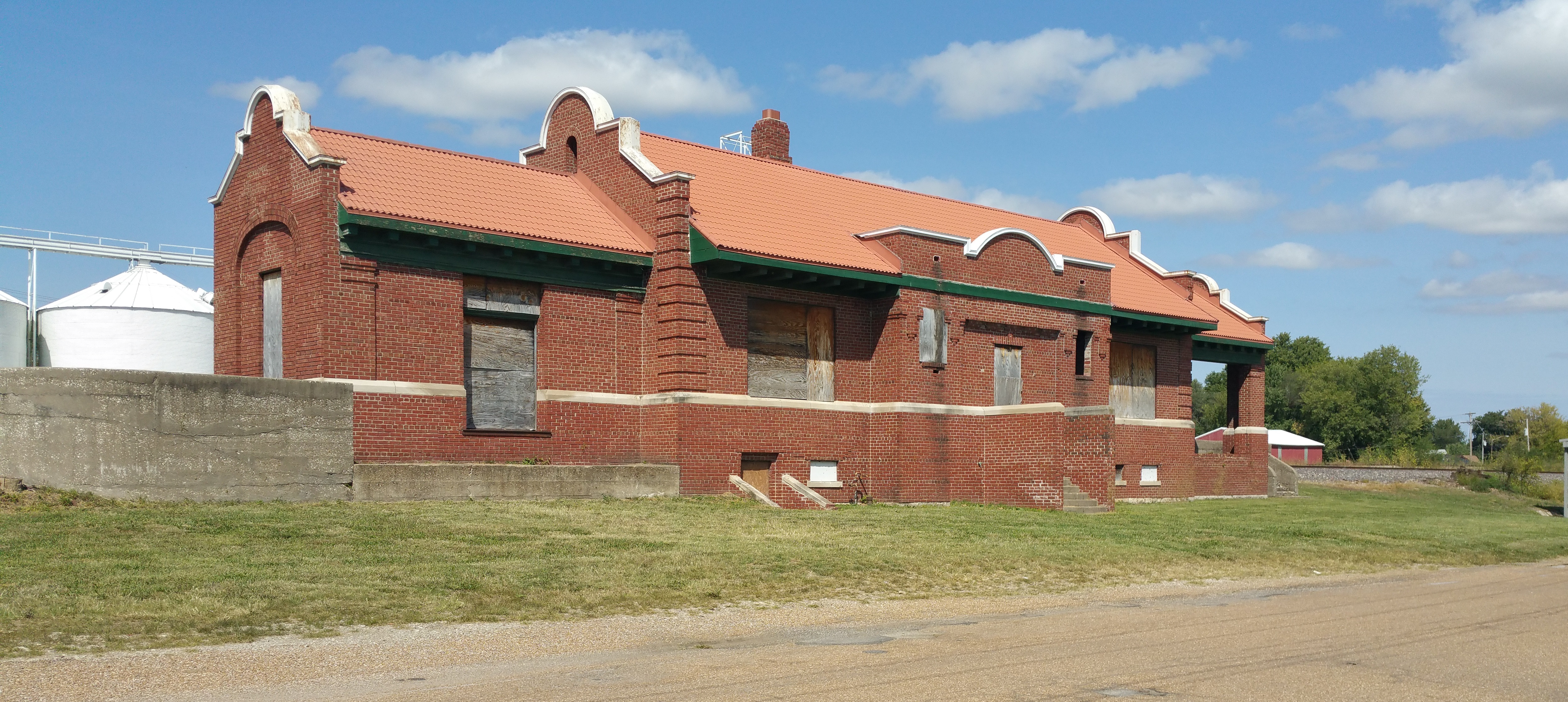
The Chicago and Alton Depot, October 2018

The depot was designed by the architect Jarvis Hunt and built in 1906 by the Chicago and Alton Railroad. It is a one-story, brick and stone building with Jacobethan Revival and Mission Revival style design elements. The building measures approximately 113 feet 2 inches in length and 42 feet 11 inches wide.

It was added to the National Register of Historic Places in 1979.

== See also ==
- National Register of Historic Places listings in Saline County, Missouri

Preceding station	Alton Railroad	Following station
Shackelford toward Kansas City	Kansas City – St. Louis	Slater toward St. Louis
