= Grand Pass, Missouri =

- Village
- Location of Grand Pass, Missouri
- Coordinates: 39°12′18″N 93°26′34″W
- Country: United States
- State: Missouri
- County: Saline

Area
  - Total: 0.11 sq mi (0.28 km^{2})
  - Land: 0.11 sq mi (0.28 km^{2})
  - Water: 0 sq mi (0.00 km^{2})
- Elevation: 719 ft (219 m)

Population (2020)
  - Total: 49
  - Density: 451.0/sq mi (174.13/km^{2})
- Time zone: UTC-6 (Central (CST))
  - Summer (DST): UTC-5 (CDT)
- ZIP code: 65339
- Area code: 660
- FIPS code: 29-28198
- GNIS feature ID: 2398186

Grand Pass is a village in Saline County, Missouri, United States. As of the 2020 census, Grand Pass had a population of 49.

== History ==
Grand Pass was named from the Great Osage Trail that passed through the town.

In 1943, German and Italian prisoners of World War II were brought to Missouri and other Midwest states as a means of solving the labor shortage caused by American men serving in the war effort. Camp Funston at Fort Riley established 12 smaller branch camps, including Grand Pass.

The Gumbo Point Archeological Site and Santa Fe Trail-Grand Pass Trail Segments are listed on the National Register of Historic Places.

== Geography ==
According to the United States Census Bureau, the village has a total area of 0.11 square miles (0.28 km^{2}), all land.

== Demographics ==
Historical population
Census	Pop.	Note	%±
1890	281		—
1930	168		—
1940	115		−31.5%
1950	124		7.8%
1960	120		−3.2%
1970	72		−40.0%
1980	71		−1.4%
1990	53		−25.4%
2000	53		0.0%
2010	66		24.5%
2020	49		−25.8%
U.S. Decennial Census

=== 2010 census ===
As of the census of 2010, there were 66 people, 26 households, and 19 families living in the village. The population density was 600.0 inhabitants per square mile (231.7/km^{2}). There were 29 housing units at an average density of 263.6 per square mile (101.8/km^{2}). The racial makeup of the village was 100.0% White. Hispanic or Latino of any race were 1.5% of the population.

There were 26 households, of which 42.3% had children under the age of 18 living with them, 53.8% were married couples living together, 11.5% had a female householder with no husband present, 7.7% had a male householder with no wife present, and 26.9% were non-families. 26.9% of all households were made up of individuals, and 11.5% had someone living alone who was 65 years of age or older. The average household size was 2.54 and the average family size was 3.00.

The median age in the village was 42 years. 30.3% of residents were under the age of 18; 3.1% were between the ages of 18 and 24; 22.7% were from 25 to 44; 30.3% were from 45 to 64; and 13.6% were 65 years of age or older. The gender makeup of the village was 47.0% male and 53.0% female.

=== 2000 census ===
As of the census of 2000, there were 53 people, 23 households, and 16 families living in the village. The population density was 499.3 inhabitants per square mile (192.8/km^{2}). There were 25 housing units at an average density of 235.5 per square mile (90.9/km^{2}). The racial makeup of the village was 83.02% White, 16.98% from other races. Hispanic or Latino of any race were 16.98% of the population.

There were 23 households, out of which 21.7% had children under the age of 18 living with them, 69.6% were married couples living together, and 30.4% were non-families. 30.4% of all households were made up of individuals, and 21.7% had someone living alone who was 65 years of age or older. The average household size was 2.30 and the average family size was 2.88.

In the village, the population was spread out, with 20.8% under the age of 18, 5.7% from 18 to 24, 18.9% from 25 to 44, 30.2% from 45 to 64, and 24.5% who were 65 years of age or older. The median age was 46 years. For every 100 females, there were 103.8 males. For every 100 females age 18 and over, there were 90.9 males.

The median income for a household in the village was $40,313, and the median income for a family was $48,125. Males had a median income of $31,250 versus $16,667 for females. The per capita income for the village was $14,089. There were 5.9% of families and 9.7% of the population living below the poverty line, including no under eighteens and 38.9% of those over 64.

== Education ==
It is in the Santa Fe R-X School District.

Metropolitan Community College has the Santa Fe school district area in its service area, but not its in-district taxation area.
