= Santa Fe Trail – Saline County Trail Segments =

- U.S. National Register of Historic Places
- Location within Missouri Location within the United States
- Location: Co. Rd. 416 (Rural Rt. 3) west of junction with MO 41, near Stanhope, Missouri
- Coordinates: 39°11′17″N 93°14′21″W
- Area: 11 acres (4.5 ha)
- MPS: Santa Fe Trail MPS
- NRHP reference No.: 94000615
- Added to NRHP: June 30, 1994

Santa Fe Trail - Saline County Trail Segments are four historic Santa Fe Trail segments located near Stanhope, Saline County, Missouri. The four trail rut segments are located on the Weinrich farm. They date to 1821–1827.

It was added to the National Register of Historic Places in 1994.
