= Santa Fe Trail =

19th-century route through central North America

Santa Fe National Historic Trail
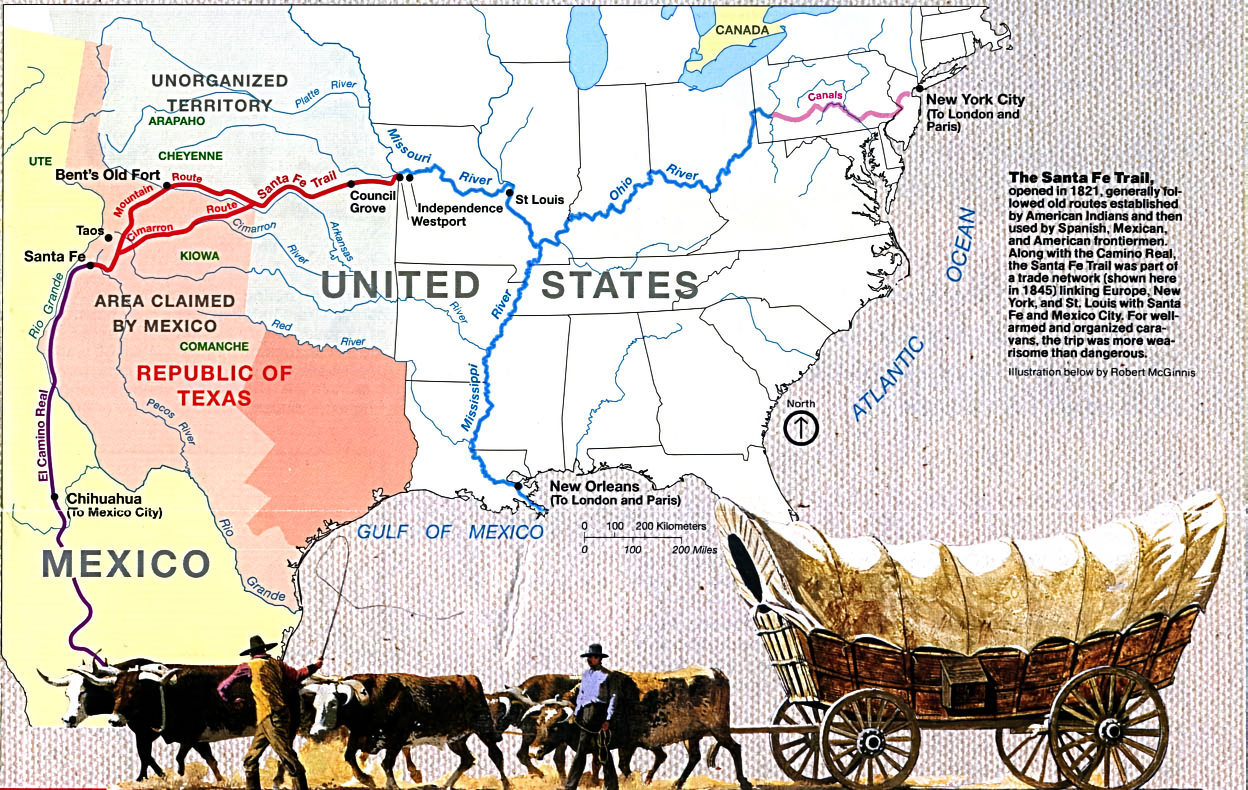
- Historic route map from Missouri to New Mexico

19th-Century Historic Operations
- Active Era: 1821–1880
- Primary Activity: International trade, freighting, and military transport
- Key Pioneer: William Becknell (Opened route in 1821)
- Transport Modes: Freight wagons, ox carts, pack mules, and stagecoaches
- Westbound Cargo: Textiles, hardware, tools, and manufactured goods
- Eastbound Cargo: Silver coins, furs, hides, and livestock (mules)

Modern Protected Status
- Designated Type: National Historic Trail
- Established: May 8, 1987
- Governing Body: National Park Service
- Administrator: National Trails Office (Regions 6, 7, & 8)

Geography & Dimensions
- States: Missouri, Kansas, Colorado, Oklahoma, Texas, New Mexico
- Historical Length: 1,203 miles (1,936 km)
- Termini: Independence, Missouri to Santa Fe, New Mexico
- Coordinates: 35°40′48″N 105°56′15″W
- Official Website: nps.gov/safe

The Santa Fe Trail was a 19th-century route through central North America that connected Franklin, Missouri, with Santa Fe, which at that time was a provincial capital of Mexico. Pioneered in 1821 by William Becknell and Joseph R. Walker, who departed from the Boonslick region along the Missouri River, the trail served as a vital commercial highway until 1880, when the railroad arrived in Santa Fe. Santa Fe was near the end of El Camino Real de Tierra Adentro which carried trade from Mexico City. The trail was later incorporated into parts of the National Old Trails Road and U.S. Route 66.

The route skirted the northern edge and crossed the north-western corner of Comancheria, the territory of the Comanche. Realizing the value, they demanded compensation for granting passage to the trail. American traders envisioned them as another market. Comanche raiding farther south in Mexico isolated New Mexico, making it more dependent on the American trade. They raided to gain a steady supply of horses to sell. By the 1840s, trail traffic through the Arkansas Valley was so numerous that bison herds were cut off from important seasonal grazing land. This habitat disruption, on top of overhunting, contributed to the collapse of the species. Comanche power declined in the region when they lost their most important game.

In 1846, during the Mexican–American War, the United States Army used the Santa Fe Trail to invade New Mexico.

After the U.S. acquisition of the Southwest that ended the war, the trail was integral to the U.S. opening the region to economic development and settlement. It played a vital role in the westward expansion of the U.S. into these new lands. The road route is commemorated today by the National Park Service as the Santa Fe National Historic Trail. A highway route that roughly follows the trail's path, through the entire length of Kansas, the southeast corner of Colorado and northern New Mexico, has been designated as the Santa Fe Trail National Scenic Byway.

== History ==
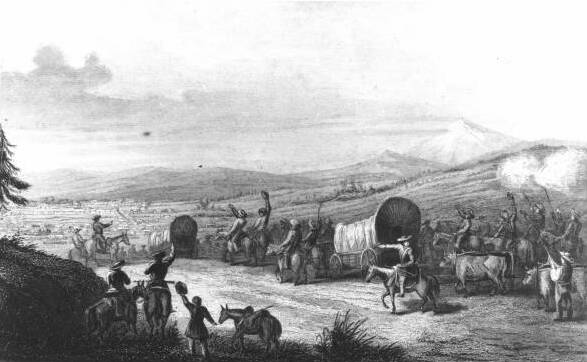
Arrival of the caravan at Santa Fe, lithograph published c. 1844

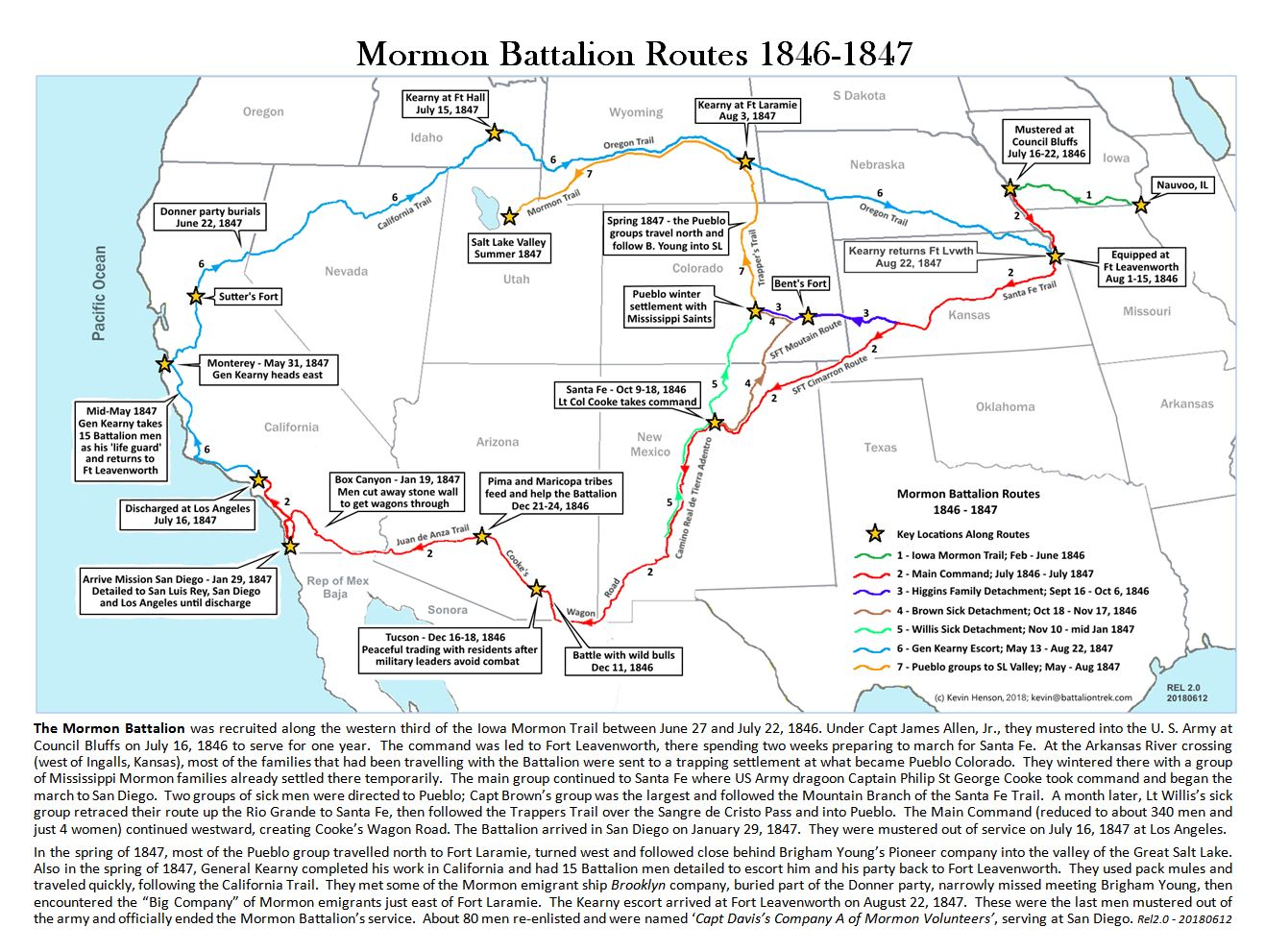
Mormon Battalion routes of 1846-1847 during the Mexican War.

The Santa Fe Trail was one of many transportation routes opened by the Indigenous people of North America as well as European trappers and traders in the second half of the 18th century. It was later used extensively by people from the United States in the 19th century after the Louisiana Purchase. Traders and settlers crossed the southwest of North America by the route connecting Independence, Missouri, with Santa Fe. Its major market in Missouri was St. Louis, with its port on the Mississippi River.

In 1719, the French officer Claude Charles Du Tisne was tasked by French authorities to establish a route to trade with the Spanish colony of Santa Fe in New Mexico. This first expedition, which started in Kaskaskia, Illinois, failed, as it was stopped by Indian tribes in Kansas. Then, at the time of the Louisiana regime, under French and then Spanish sovereignty, the French traders Pierre Antoine and Paul Mallet made a first trip in 1739 and 1740, starting also from Kaskaskia, Illinois, reaching Santa Fe and returning. They made other expeditions in 1741 and 1750, which faced various challenges from Indians and Spaniards. Then, the French explorer Pierre Vial made another pioneering trip on the route in 1792, and French traders and trappers from St. Louis gained progressively a fur trading dominance from the Spanish in Santa Fe as well as with the Indian tribes living in this vast region. Other French traders and trappers made trips on the trail from St. Louis, such as Auguste Pierre Chouteau and Jules de Mun in 1815, who were arrested by Spanish authorities in Santa Fe.

=== Post Louisiana Purchase ===
After Louisiana was sold to the United States in 1803 (Louisiana Purchase), Americans improved and publicized the Santa Fe Trail beginning in 1822, in order to take advantage of new trade opportunities with Mexico which had just won independence from Spain in the Mexican War of Independence. Manufactured goods were hauled from Missouri to Santa Fe, which was then in the northern Mexican state of Nuevo Mexico. The trail is involved in many famous incidents of the Old Wild West. Kit Carson, who became famous in his own lifetime used the trail to escape his apprenticeship and headed west from Missouri in 1826.

Junction of the Gila & Colorado Rivers. A military reconnaissance, from Fort Leavenworth, in Missouri, to San Diego, in California, including parts of the Arkansas, Del Norte, and Gila rivers by Lieut. Col. W.H. Emory, in 1846-7, with the advanced guard of the " Army of the West"

Settlers seeking the opportunity to hold free land used wagon trains to follow various emigrant trails that branched off to points west. The political philosophy of manifest destiny, the idea that the U.S. should extend from one coast to another, dominated national political discussions. The trail connected interior port cities along the Mississippi and Missouri and their wagon train outfitters to western destinations. The trail was used to carry products from the central plains to the trail head towns St. Joseph and Independence, Missouri. Supplying the towns in this early period were shallow-draft river steamers which churned up the Missouri River from St. Louis, their decks laden with textiles, iron hardware, gunpowder, and dry provisions, they transformed the early towns into logistics engines. At the docks, the local outfitters, merchants, and military quartermasters stripped the vessels of their cargo, transferring tons of freight onto the waiting backs of ox-wagons and mule pack trains. For the pioneering traders heading southwest down the Santa Fe Trail or the rugged mountain men pushing northwest into the untamed Rockies, these river towns served as a staging grounds—a vital bottleneck where the new maritime technology of steam power directly fueled the building of the West.

In the 1820s–1830s, it was also sporadically important in the reverse trade, used by traders to transport foods and supplies to the fur trappers and mountain men opening the remote Northwest, especially in the interior Northwest: Idaho, Wyoming, Colorado, and Montana. A mule trail (trapper's trails) led to points north to supply the lucrative overland fur trade in ports on the Pacific Coast.

In the spring of 1846 Francis Parkman arrives in the town of Independence, en-route to a sightseeing and historic tour of the Rocky's with a guide and group. He described the scene in his book:

Being at leisure one day, I rode over to Independence. The town was crowded. A multitude of shops had sprung up to furnish the emigrants and Santa Fe traders with necessaries for their journey ; and there was an incessant hammering and banging from a dozen blacksmiths' sheds, where the heavy wagons were being repaired, and the horses and oxen shod. The streets were thronged with men, horses, and mules. While I was in the town, a train of emigrant wagons from Illinois passed through, to join the camp on the prairie, and stopped in the principal street. A multitude of healthy children's faces were peeping out from under the covers of the wagons. Here and there a buxom damsel was seated on horseback, holding over her sunburnt face an old umbrella or a parasol, once gaudy enough, but now miserably faded. The men, very soberlooking countrymen, stood about their oxen ; and as I passed I noticed three old fellows, who, with their long whips in their hands, were zealously discussing the doctrine of regeneration. The emigrants, however, are not all of this stamp. Among them are some of the vilest outcasts in the country. I have often perplexed myself to divine the various motives that give impulse to this migration ; but whatever they may be, whether an insane hope of a better condition in life, or a desire of shaking off restraints of law and society, or mere restlessness, certain it is, that multitudes bitterly repent the journey, and, after they have reached the land of promise, are happy enough to escape from it.

Upon the outbreak of the Mexican-American War, General Kearney and the Army of the West plied through the Santa Fe Trail, through Missouri and Fort Leavenworth down south through the Mountain path.

Even after the Mexican-American War and well into the 19th century, the Trail remained partly unsecured, as shown in the White Massacre of 1849. Well into the late 19th century there were conflicts to secure the areas as part of the broader struggle of taming the West.

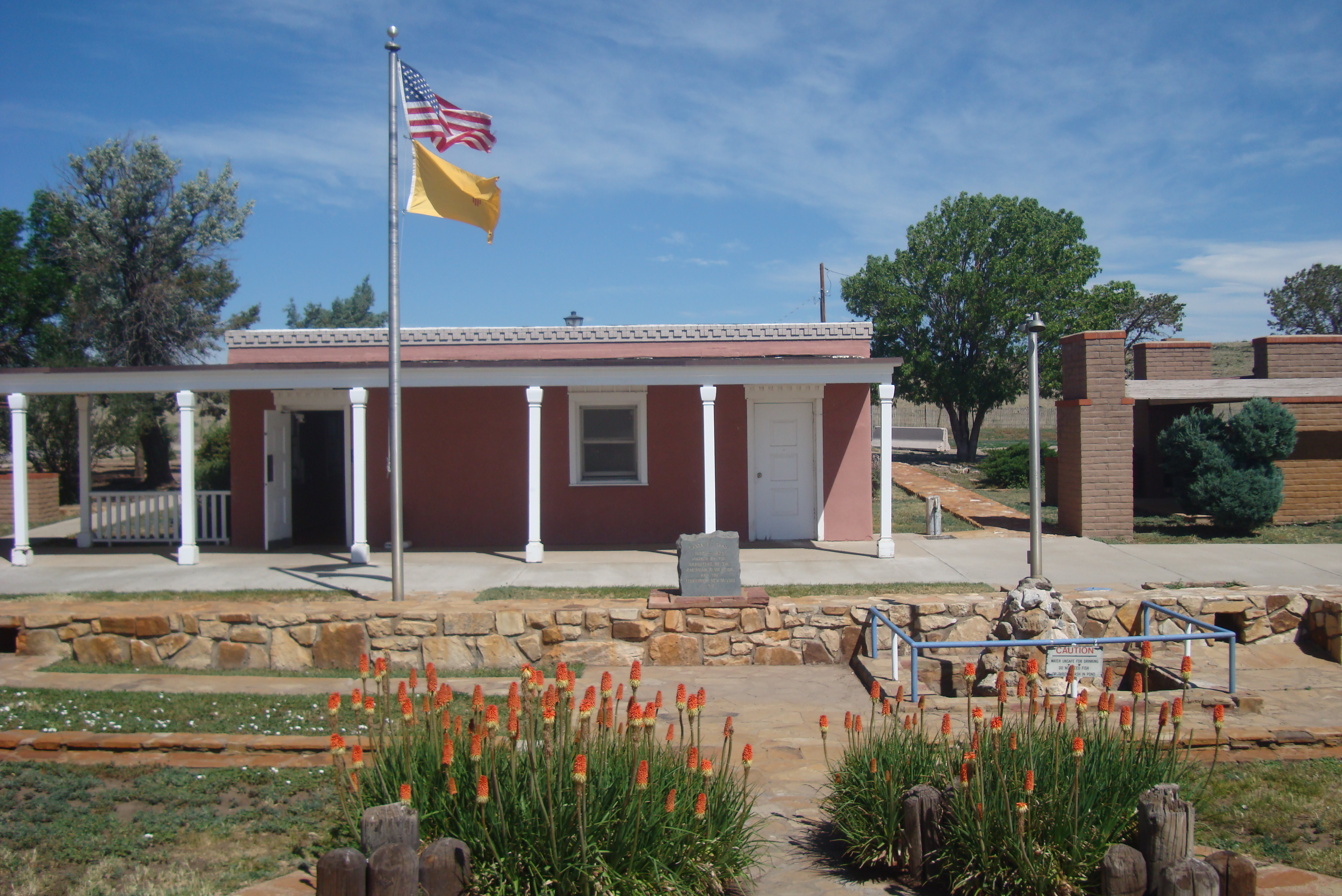
Former U.S. Army outpost on the Santa Fe Trail, now a rest area on I-25 in northern New Mexico

=== North–South trade ===
Santa Fe was near the northern terminus of El Camino Real de Tierra Adentro, which led overland between Mexico City to San Juan Pueblo, New Mexico.

Cargo mule trains were run from Fort Bernard in Wyoming to the Santa Fe Trail at Fort Bent in Colorado .

=== Importance of Santa Fe ===
Map of the Republic of Texas showing lands claimed by Texas after 1836 and present-day outline of New Mexico on the boundaries of 1836–1845

In 1825, the merchant Manuel Escudero of Chihuahua was commissioned by New Mexico governor Bartolome Baca to negotiate in Washington, D.C., for opening U.S. borders to traders from Mexico. Beginning in 1826, prominent aristocratic families of New Mexicans, such as the Chávezes, Armijos, Pereas, and Oteros, entered into the commerce along the trail. By 1843, traders from New Mexico and Chihuahua had become the majority of traders involved in the traffic of goods over the Santa Fe Trail.

In 1835, Mexico City had sent Albino Pérez to govern the department of New Mexico as Jefe Politico (political chief or governor) and as commanding military officer. In 1837, the forces of Rio Arriba (the upper Rio Grande, i.e., northern New Mexico) rebelled against Pérez's enforcement of the recent Mexican constitution, new revenue laws taxing Santa Fe commerce and entertainment, and the large grants of New Mexico land to wealthy Mexicans. New Mexicans appreciated the relative freedoms of a frontier, remote from Mexico City. The rebels defeated and executed governor Albino Perez, but were later ousted by the forces of Rio Abajo (the lower Rio Grande, or southern New Mexico) led by Manuel Armijo.

=== Conflict between Texas and Mexico ===
The Republic of Texas competed with Mexico in claiming Santa Fe, as part of the territory north and east of the Rio Grande which both nations claimed following Texas's secession from Mexico in 1836.

In 1841, a small military and trading expedition departed from Austin, Texas, for Santa Fe. They represented the Republic of Texas and its president Mirabeau B. Lamar. Their intention was to persuade the people of Santa Fe and New Mexico to relinquish control over the territory under dispute with Mexico, and over associated Santa Fe Trail commerce. Knowing about recent political disturbances there, they hoped for a welcome by the rebellious faction in New Mexico. What was known as the Texan Santa Fe Expedition encountered many difficulties. The party was captured by governor Armijo's Mexican army under less than honest negotiations. They were subjected to harsh and austere treatment during a tortuous forced march to Mexico City, where they were tried, convicted and imprisoned for their insurgent activities.

In 1842, Colonel William A. Christy wrote Sam Houston, president of Texas, requesting support for an overthrow scheme by Charles Warfield dependent on armed forces. He proposed deposing the governments in the Mexican provinces of New Mexico and Chihuahua and returning half of the spoils to the Republic of Texas. Houston agreed, provided the operation be conducted under the strictest secrecy.

He commissioned Warfield as a colonel, who attempted to raise volunteers in Texas, St. Louis, Missouri; and the southern Rockies for a Warfield Expedition. He recruited John McDaniel and a small band of men in the proximate vicinity of St. Louis, giving McDaniel the rank of a Texas captain. After Warfield headed toward the Rockies with a companion, McDaniel led a robbery in April 1843 (in present-day Rice County, Kansas) of a lightly defended Santa Fe Trail trading caravan. This resulted in the murder of its leader Antonio José Chávez, the son of a former governor of New Mexico, Francisco Xavier Chávez.

Warfield was reportedly unaware of the crime. McDaniel and one accomplice were tried, convicted and executed. Other participating suspects arrested by the U.S. were convicted and imprisoned. The newspapers reported that Americans and Mexicans were outraged by the crime. Local merchants and citizens at the U.S. end of the Santa Fe Trail demanded justice and a return to the stable commerce which their economy depended on.

After the murder of Chávez, Warfield began limited military hostilities in the region using recruits from the southern Rockies. He made an unprovoked attack on Mexican troops outside Mora, New Mexico, leaving five dead. Warfield lost his horses after an encounter in Wagon Mound, where the Mexican forces had made chase. After Warfield's men reached Bent's Fort on foot, they disbanded.

In February 1843, Colonel Jacob Snively had received a commission to intercept Mexican caravans along the Santa Fe Trail, similar to that received by Warfield the year prior. After disbanding the volunteers under his command, Warfield located and joined the 190-man, Texas "Battalion of Invincibles", under the command of Snively. New Mexico Governor Manuel Armijo led Mexican troops out of Santa Fe to protect incoming caravans. But, after the Invincibles destroyed much of an advance party led by Captain Ventura Lovato, the governor retreated. Following this battle, many Americans resigned and Snively's force was reduced to little over 100 men. Snively planned to plunder Mexican merchant caravans on territory claimed by Texas, in retaliation for recent Texian executions and Mexican invasions, but his battalion was quickly arrested and disarmed by the US troops escorting the caravans. After disarming these men, Captain Philip St. George Cooke allowed them to return to Texas.

== Mother of the railroad ==
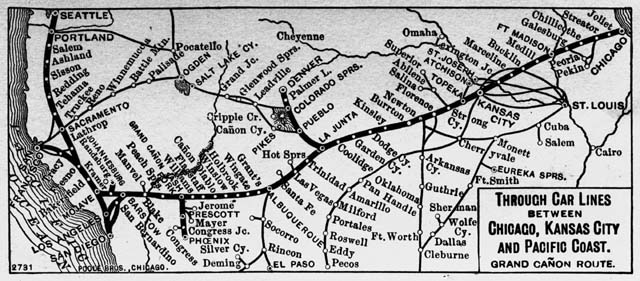
Connections along the Santa Fe Railroad, showing the principal regular stops on the AT&SF mainline, including cattle drive destinations such as Dodge City. Most of these Kansas, Colorado, and New Mexican towns were first served by the Santa Fe Trail.

In 1863, while railroad legislation underwent continual revisions, entrepreneurs grew more interested in the American Southwest, leading to the construction of the Atchison, Topeka and Santa Fe Railway. As the name suggests, the intended eastern terminus was to be Atchison, Kansas.

In Kansas, the AT&SF roadbed roughly paralleled the Santa Fe Trail west of Topeka as it expanded between 1868 and 1874. When a railroad bridge was built across the Missouri River to connect eastern markets to the Dodge City cattle trail and Colorado coal mines, the railroad spurred the growth of Kansas City, Missouri. Building the railway westwards beyond the New Mexico border was delayed and placed the railroad under financial pressure. In response, they offered packaged "Shopping Excursion deals" to potential real estate buyers. The railroad began to discount such trips to visit its land offices and gave back the ticket price as part of the purchase price if a sale was concluded.

The railroad's sale of its land granted by congress fostered growth of new towns and businesses along its route, which generated railway traffic and revenues. With this financial base, the railway extended west, gradually adding new connections through rougher west country along the western Trail. With the development of rail transport, traffic on the Trail soon dropped to merely local trade. After World War I the trail gradually became a paved automobile road.

== Route ==
Historic route, Santa Fe National Historic Trail LOC 97682418

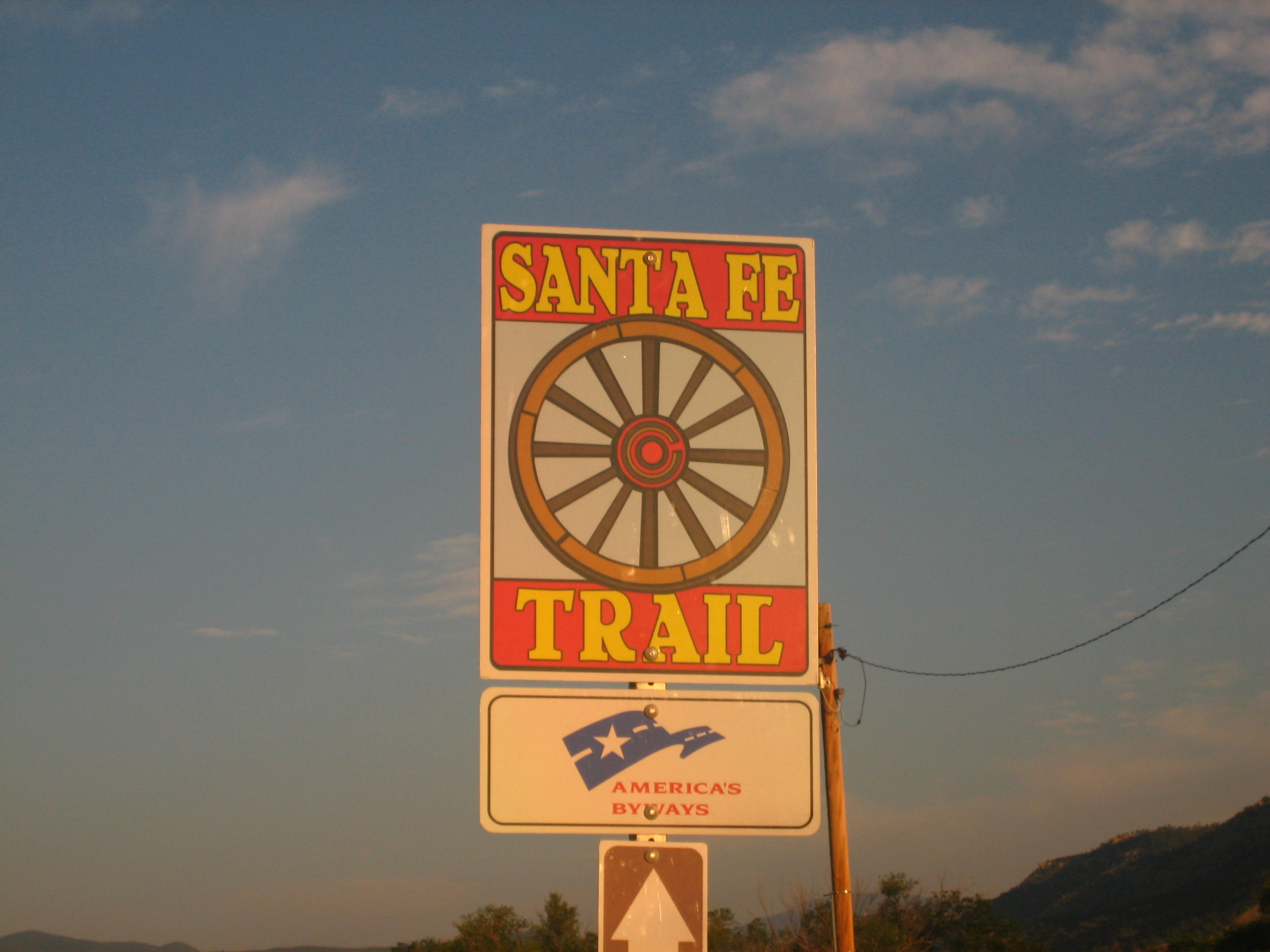
Santa Fe Trail highway sign in Cimarron, New Mexico

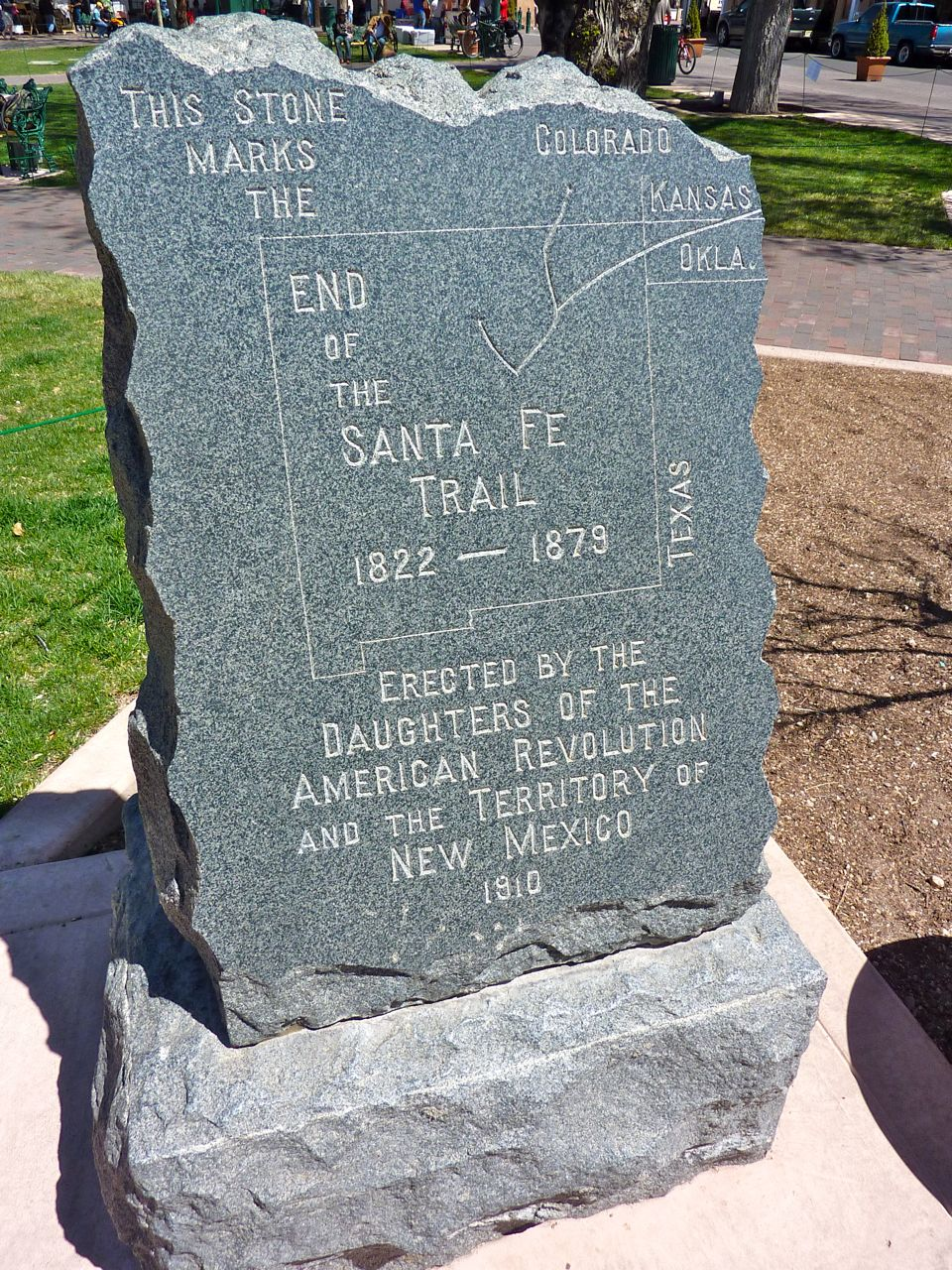
End of the Santa Fe Trail marker on the Plaza in Santa Fe, New Mexico

The eastern end of the trail was in the central Missouri town of Franklin on the north bank of the Missouri River. The route across Missouri first used by Becknell followed portions of the existing Osage Trace and the Medicine Trails. West of Franklin, the trail crossed the Missouri near Arrow Rock, after which it followed roughly the route of present-day U.S. Route 24. It passed north of Marshall, through Lexington to Fort Osage, then to Independence. Independence was also one of the historic "jumping off points" for the Oregon and California Trails.

West of Independence, it roughly followed the route of U.S. Route 56 from near the town of Olathe to the western border of Kansas. It enters Colorado, cutting across the southeast corner of the state before entering New Mexico. The section of the trail between Independence and Olathe was also used by immigrants on the California and Oregon Trails, which branched off to the northwest near Gardner, Kansas.

From Olathe, the trail passed through the towns of Baldwin City, Burlingame, and Council Grove, then swung west of McPherson to the town of Lyons. West of Lyons the trail followed nearly the route of present-day Highway 56 to Great Bend. Ruts in the earth made from the trail are still visible in several locations (Ralph's Ruts are visible in aerial photos at (38.35959264°N 98.42225502°W). At Great Bend, the trail encountered the Arkansas River. Branches of the trail followed both sides of the river upstream to Dodge City and Garden City.

West of Garden City in southwestern Kansas the trail splits into two branches. One of the branches, called the Mountain Route or the Upper Crossing continues up the Arkansas River to the confluence with the Purgatoire River near La Junta continuing along the Purgatoire River to Trinidad, then south through the Raton Pass into New Mexico.

The other main branch, called the Cimarron Cutoff or Cimarron Crossing or Middle Crossing cut southwest across the Cimarron Desert (also known as the Waterscrape or La Jornada) to the valley of the Cimarron River near the town of Ulysses and Elkhart then continued toward Boise City, Oklahoma, to Clayton, New Mexico, joining up with northern branch at Fort Union. This route was generally very hazardous because it had very little water. The Cimarron River was one of the only sources of water along this branch of the trail.

From Watrous, the reunited branches continued southward to Santa Fe. Part of this route has been designated a National Scenic Byway.

== Challenges ==
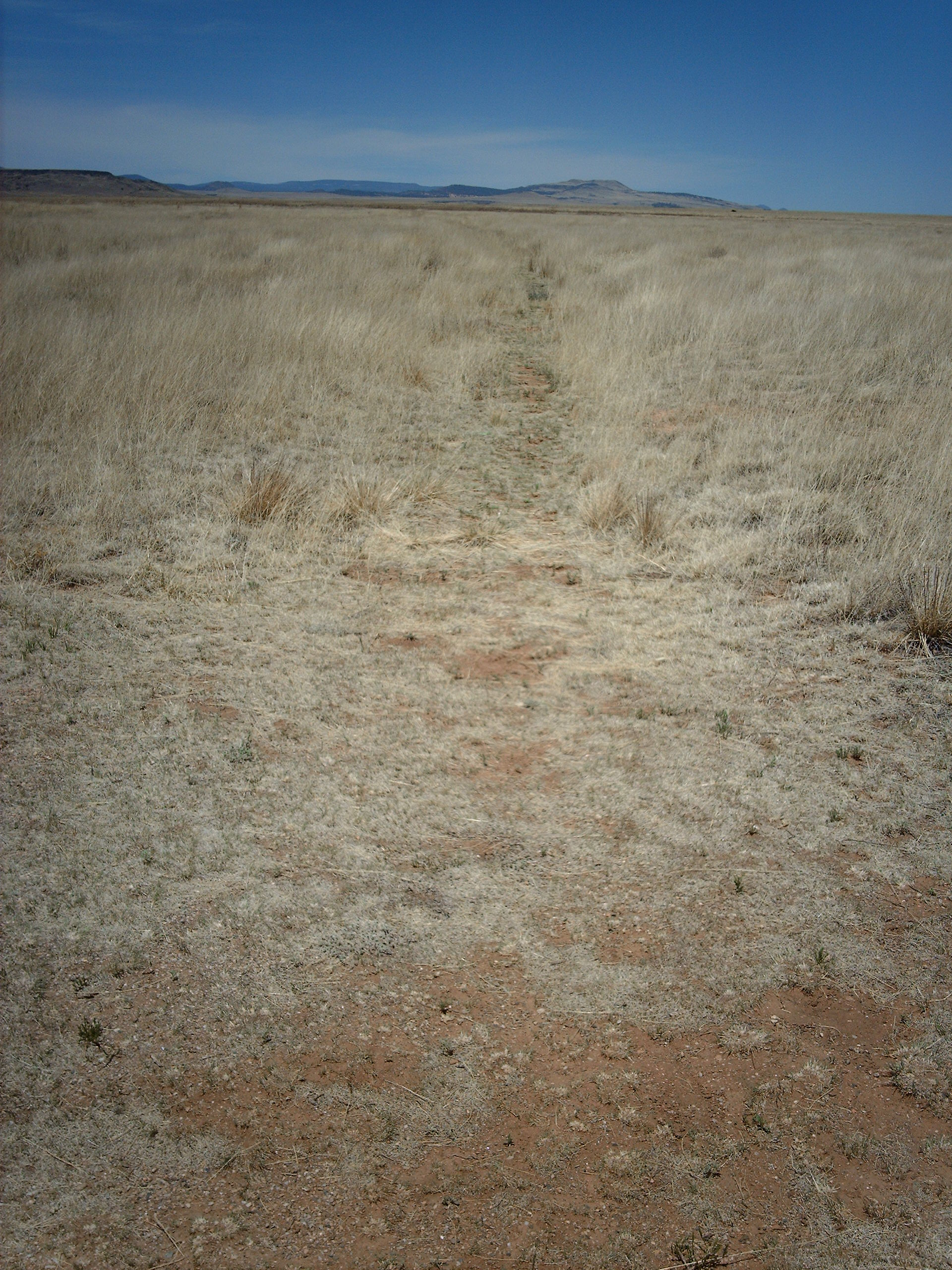
Santa Fe Trail Ruts at Fort Union

Travelers faced many hardships along the Santa Fe Trail. The trail was a challenging 900 miles (1,400 km) of dangerous plains, hot deserts, and steep and rocky mountains. The natural weather was and is continental: very hot and dry summers, coupled with long and bitterly cold winters. Fresh water was scarce, and the high steppe-like plains were nearly treeless. Water flows in the Pecos, Arkansas, Cimarron, and Canadian rivers that drain the region vary by 90 or more percent during an average year. Also on this trail, unlike the Oregon Trail, there was a serious danger of Indian attacks, for neither the Comanche nor the Apache of the southern high plains tolerated trespassers. In 1825, Congress voted for federal protection for the Santa Fe Trail, even though much of it lay in the Mexican territory. Lack of food and water also made the trail very risky. Weather conditions, like huge lightning storms, gave the travelers even more difficulty. If a storm developed, there was often no place to take shelter and the livestock could get spooked. Rattlesnakes often posed a threat, and many people died due to snakebites. The caravan size increased later on to prevent Indian raids. The travelers also harnessed more oxen instead of mules—primarily for the greater hauling power of oxen but also because they were less valued by Indians and thus less risk of being raided.

== Historic preservation ==
Segments of this trail in Missouri, Kansas, Oklahoma, and New Mexico are listed on the National Register of Historic Places. In Missouri, this includes the 85th and Manchester "Three Trails" Trail Segment, Arrow Rock Ferry Landing, Santa Fe Trail – Grand Pass Trail Segments, and Santa Fe Trail – Saline County Trail Segments. The longest clearly identifiable section of the trail, Santa Fe Trail Remains, near Dodge City, Kansas, is listed as a National Historic Landmark. In Colorado, Santa Fe Trail Mountain Route – Bent's New Fort is included on the National Register.

== Notable features ==
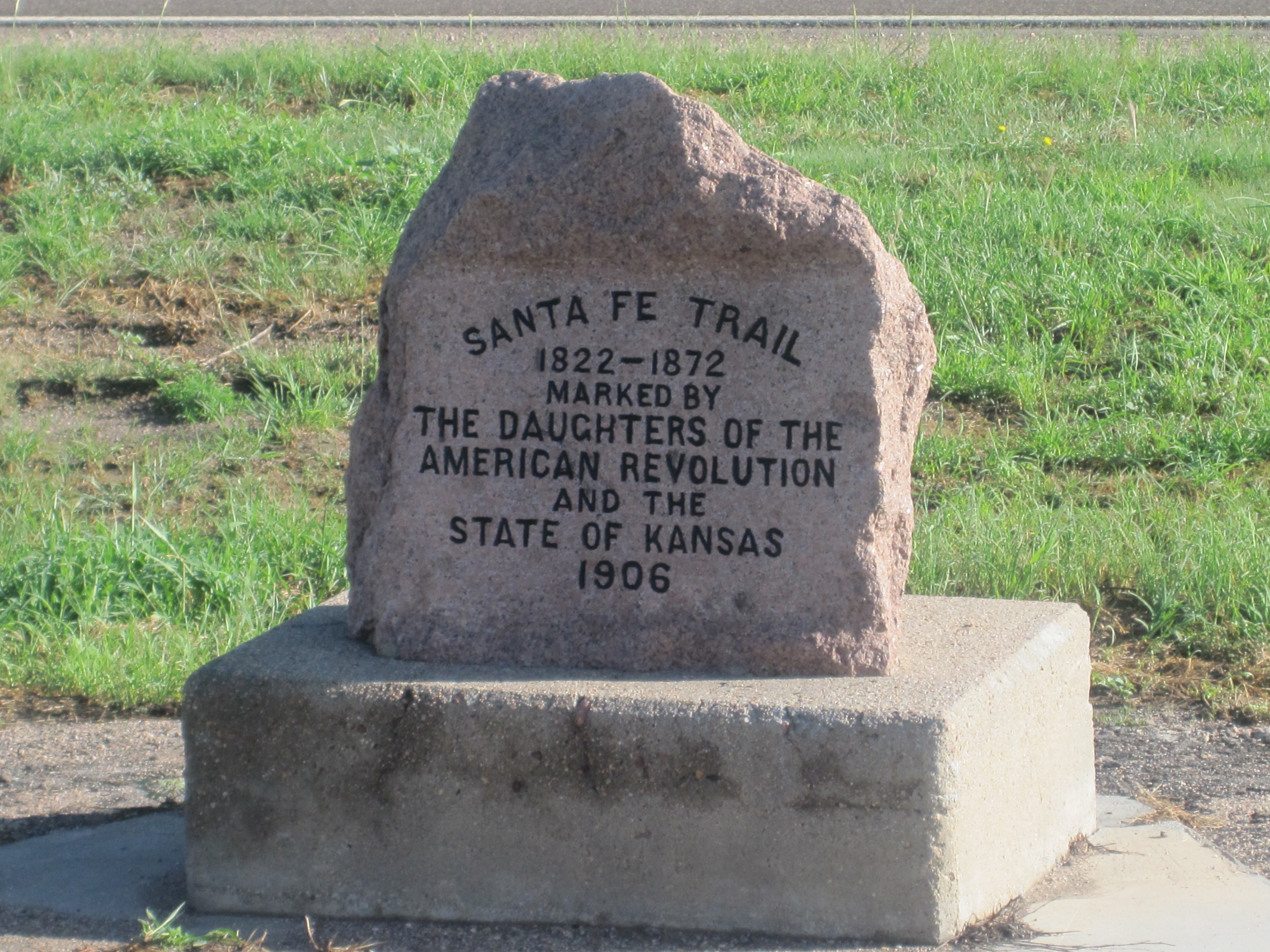
Santa Fe Trail marker in Coolidge, Kansas

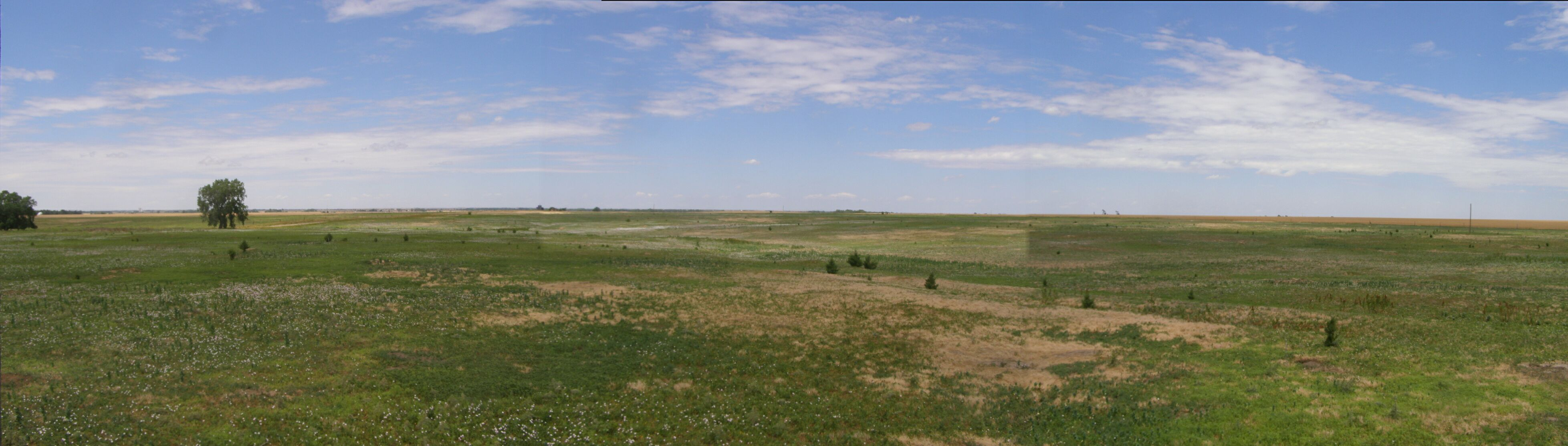
Santa Fe Trail Ruts west of Larned, Kansas

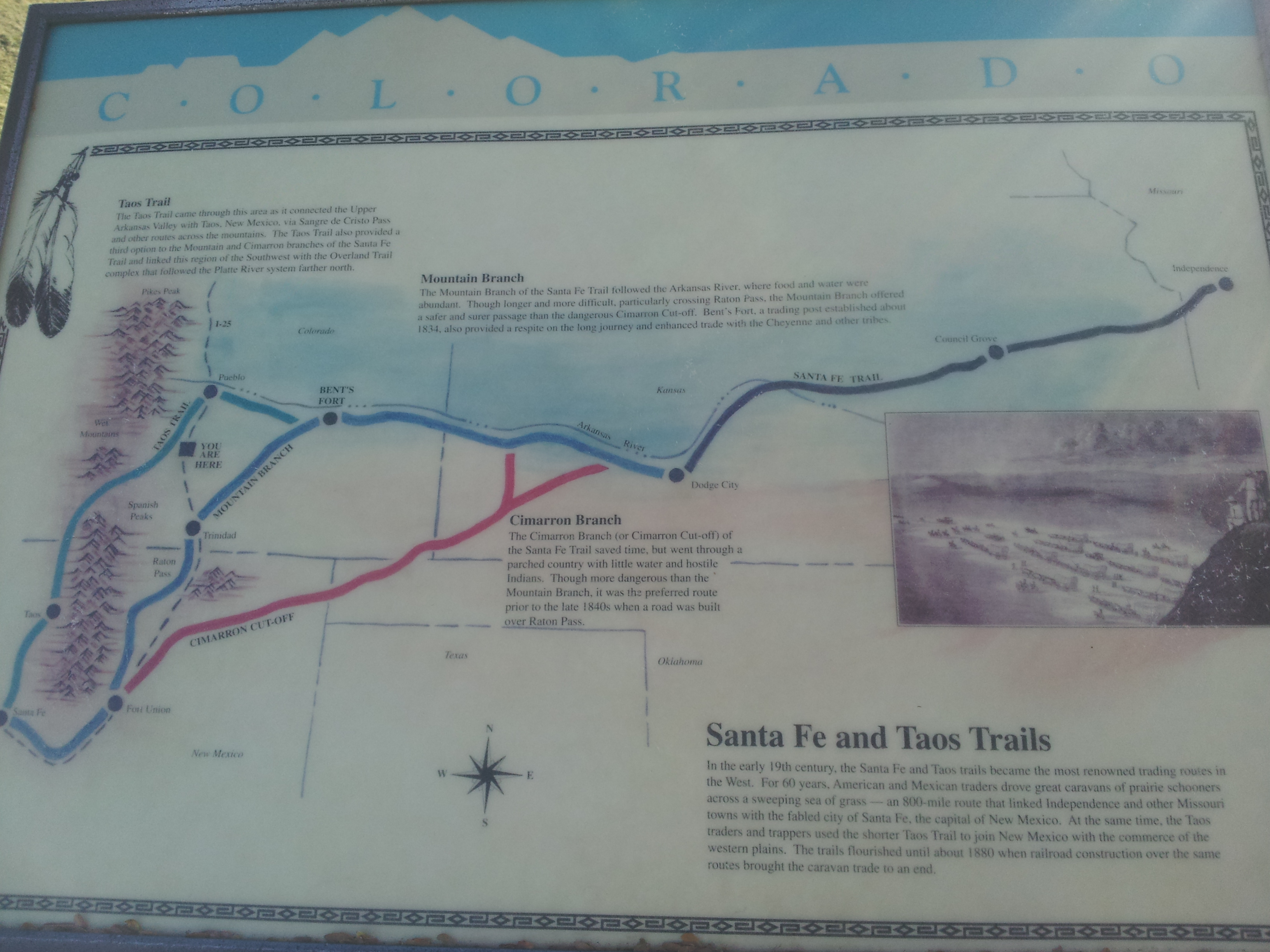
Santa Fe Trail marker at the Cuerno Verde Rest Area, Colorado

Missouri

- Arrow Rock (Arrow Rock Landing, Santa Fe Spring, Huston Tavern)
- Harvey Spring/Weinrich Ruts
- Independence (Santa Fe trail Ruts, Lower Independence (Blue Mills) Landing, Upper Independence (Wayne City) Landing.
- Kansas City (Westport Landing, Big Blue River Crossing)

Kansas

- Fairway, Kansas (Shawnee Mission)
- Council Grove (Kaw Mission, Neosho River Crossing, Hermit's Cave, Last Chance Store, Council Oak, Post Office Oak)
- Fort Larned National Historic Site
- Fort Dodge (Jackson's Grove and Island, Santa Fe Trail Ruts, Middle Crossing, Point of Rocks, Fort Atkinson Site)
- Point of Rocks

Mountain Route towards Colorado

- Arkansas River Crossing

Colorado

Mountain Route

- Bent's Old Fort National Historic Site
- Raton Pass

Cimarron Route thru Kansas towards Oklahoma

- Cimarron River
- Cimarron National Grassland

New Mexico

Mountain Route

- Clifton House
- Cimarron (Aztec Mill, Cimarron Plaza and Well)
- Philmont Scout Ranch

Cimarron Route

- Kiowa National Grassland

Joint route

- Fort Union National Monument
- Pecos National Historical Park
- Santa Fe
- De Vargas Street House, Oldest House in the United States
- Northern Rio Grande National Heritage Area

== Notable incidents ==
Year	Incident	Description	Casualty / Damage	Location	Tribe / Perpetrator Involved
1849	White Massacre	A caravan led by merchant James White was ambushed while traveling west. White and several companions were killed, while his wife, Ann, daughter, and a servant were taken captive.	6 killed; 3 captured (all captives subsequently perished or were killed in captivity).	Near Point of Rocks, New Mexico Territory	Jicarilla Apache
1850	Wagon Mound massacre	A ten-man U.S. Postal Service ox-wagon carrying mail bound for Santa Fe was caught in a brutal two-day running battle and eventually overwhelmed at Santa Clara Springs.	10 mail carriers killed; 9 Native warriors killed. Mail wagon burned.	Near Wagon Mound, New Mexico Territory	Jicarilla Apache and Mouache Ute
1854	Manco Burro Pass Ambush	Trader Lucien Maxwell attempted to cross the pass with a party of 15 men after prior route closures, resulting in a sudden ambush that temporarily halted trail traffic.	Several killed; majority of the party wounded (including Maxwell).	Manco Burro Pass, near Raton, New Mexico	Jicarilla Apache
1861	Walnut Creek Massacre	A party of Mexican traders and hunters traveling off the main trail road were attacked, scalped, and mutilated by a war party while out hunting buffalo.	6 killed, scalped, and mutilated.	Near Walnut Creek, Kansas	Kiowa
1864	Otero Caravan Robbery	Don Antonio Manuel Otero's heavily protected commercial trail caravan was ambushed by highwaymen using the Civil War as a cover, marking the trail's first major recorded non-tribal heist.	Major theft of financial capital, saddles, and draft animals; no human deaths.	Near Raton Pass, New Mexico border	Local highwaymen / Outlaws
1865	Nine Mile Ridge Massacre	After a wagon boss refused to supply food to famished Native Americans, an anxious teamster accidentally shot a warrior, prompting a retaliatory dawn ambush on the freight train.	8 teamsters killed; 1 escaped. 9 freight wagons compromised.	Nine Mile Ridge, Santa Fe Trail (Kansas)	Cheyenne and Arapaho
1891	Wharton Santa Fe Train Robbery	The notorious Dalton Gang returned from California and raided a stationary train operating on the Santa Fe line, kickstarting their brief, violent spree across the territory.	A few hundred dollars stolen from the express car and passengers.	Wharton (now Perry), Indian Territory	Dalton Gang
1892	Red Rock Santa Fe Train Robbery	Continuing their focus on regional trail commerce, the Dalton Gang successfully flagged down and boarded another Santa Fe train, looting the passengers directly.	Several hundred dollars in cash and jewelry stolen.	Red Rock, Indian Territory	Dalton Gang
1897	Edmond Santa Fe Train Robbery	The bumbling Jennings Gang boarded a Santa Fe train but failed to blow open the secure express safe with dynamite, settling instead for pocket change from passengers.	Minor personal cash stolen; safe structurally damaged but unbreached.	Edmond, Indian Territory	Jennings Gang

== See also ==
- MO: Jackson County Historic Places
- KS: Johnson County Historic Places
- OK: Cimarron County Historic Places
- NM: Colfax County Historic Places
- Oregon-California Trails Association
- Pawnee Rock
- Related National Park Units
  - Fort Larned National Historic Site
  - Bent's Old Fort National Historic Site
  - Fort Union National Monument
- Santa Fe Trail Remains
- Santa Fe Trail Museum, part of the Trinidad History Museum
- Santa Fe Trail Historical Park in El Monte, California
- Trailside Center museum in Kansas City, Missouri
- Scenic byways in the United States
- Tree in the Trail
