= Napton, Missouri =

- Unincorporated community
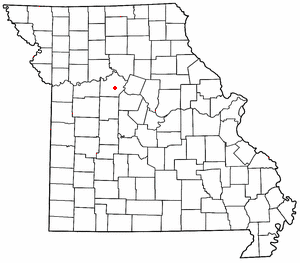
- Location of Napton, Missouri
- Coordinates: 39°03′10″N 93°05′02″W
- Country: United States
- State: Missouri
- County: Saline
- Elevation: 640 ft (200 m)
- Time zone: UTC-6 (Central (CST))
  - Summer (DST): UTC-5 (CDT)
- Area code: 660
- GNIS feature ID: 723116

Napton, originally known as Jonesboro, is an unincorporated community in southeastern Saline County, Missouri, United States. Napton is located on Missouri Supplemental Route E, 8 miles (13 km) southeast of Marshall.

Napton was originally named Jonesboro, and under the latter name was laid out in 1887, and named after the local Jones family. The present name honors William Barclay Napton, Judge of the Supreme Court of Missouri.

From 1831 to 1839, Jonesboro was the county seat of Saline County. "In 1831, the county seat was removed from Jefferson to Jonesboro ... In 1839, the county seat was removed from Jonesboro to Arrow Rock ..." (From A Directory of Towns, Villages, and Hamlets Past and Present of Saline County, Missouri, Compiled by Arthur Paul Moser Jonesboro had a post office beginning in 1828 and postal service was available there intermittently through 1873.

The George A. Murrell House and Neff Tavern Smokehouse are listed on the National Register of Historic Places.
