= Fisher-Gabbert Archeological Site =

- U.S. National Register of Historic Places
- Nearest city: Miami, Missouri
- Area: 26.7 acres (10.8 ha)
- NRHP reference No.: 72000730
- Added to NRHP: March 16, 1972

Fisher-Gabbert Archeological Site, also known as Missouri Archaeological Survey Number 23SA128, is a historic archaeological site located near Miami, Saline County, Missouri. It was partially excavated in 1970. Excavated from the site were pottery and stone tools that belong to the "Hopewell tradition."

It was added to the National Register of Historic Places in 1972.
