= Sweet Springs, Missouri =

City in Saline County, Missouri, United States

- City
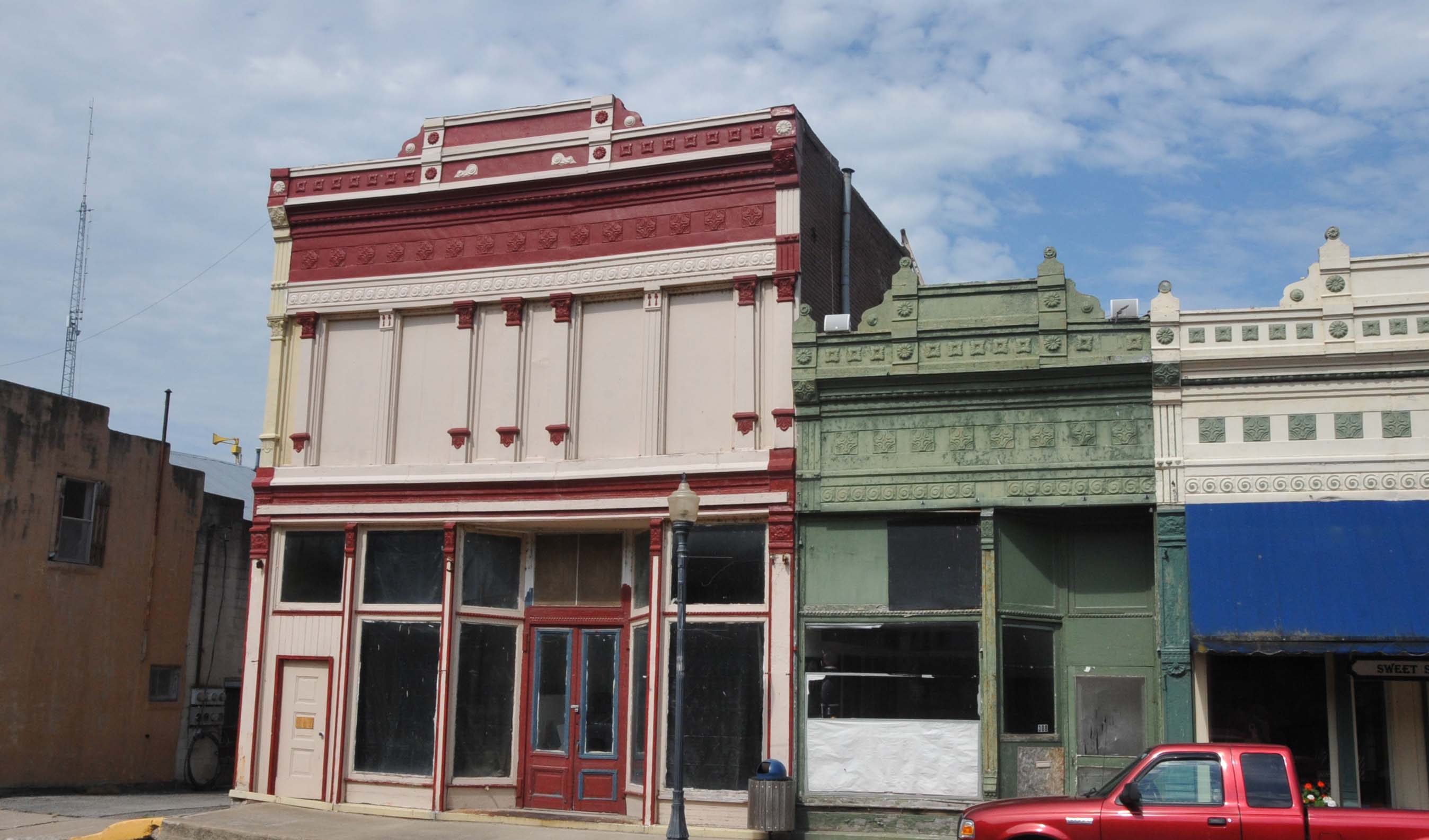
- Sweet Spring Historic District, July 2013

- Location of Sweet Springs, Missouri
- Coordinates: 38°57′54″N 93°24′55″W
- Country: United States
- State: Missouri
- County: Saline
- Incorporated: 1870

Area
  - Total: 1.68 sq mi (4.35 km^{2})
  - Land: 1.66 sq mi (4.31 km^{2})
  - Water: 0.015 sq mi (0.04 km^{2})
- Elevation: 712 ft (217 m)

Population (2020)
  - Total: 1,316
  - Estimate (2023): 1,320
  - Density: 791.4/sq mi (305.55/km^{2})
- Time zone: UTC-6 (Central (CST))
  - Summer (DST): UTC-5 (CDT)
- ZIP code: 65351
- Area code: 660
- FIPS code: 29-71890
- GNIS feature ID: 2396016
- Website: cityofsweetsprings.org

Sweet Springs is a city in Saline County, Missouri, United States, along the Blackwater River. As of the 2020 census, Sweet Springs had a population of 1,316.

== History ==
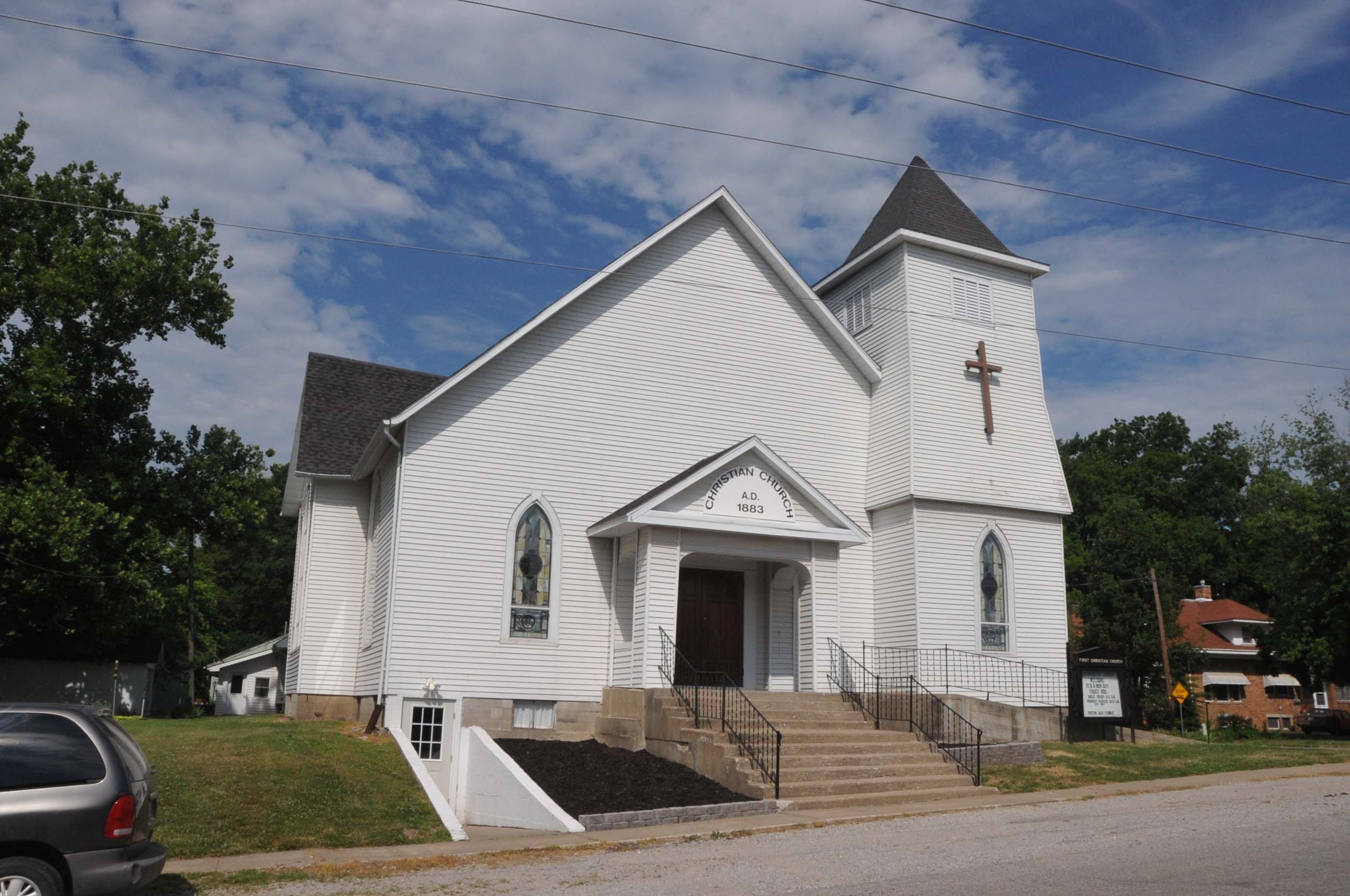
First Christian Church in Sweet Springs, July 2013

Sweet Springs was originally named "Brownsville", and under the latter name was platted in 1838. A post office called Sweet Springs has been in operation since 1849. The present name is after a mineral spring near the original town site. On April 19, 1882, a tornado destroyed much of Sweet Springs, killing 11 people and injuring 100. The First Christian Church and Sweet Springs Historic District are listed on the National Register of Historic Places.

== Geography ==
Sweet Springs is situated at the intersection of Interstate 70 / U.S. Route 40 and Route 127.

According to the United States Census Bureau, the city has a total area of 1.68 square miles (4.35 km^{2}), of which 1.66 square miles (4.30 km^{2}) is land and 0.02 square miles (0.05 km^{2}) is water.

== Demographics ==
Historical population
Census	Pop.	Note	%±
1880	1,182		—
1890	1,137		−3.8%
1900	1,080		−5.0%
1910	1,122		3.9%
1920	1,177		4.9%
1930	1,641		39.4%
1940	1,413		−13.9%
1950	1,439		1.8%
1960	1,452		0.9%
1970	1,716		18.2%
1980	1,694		−1.3%
1990	1,595		−5.8%
2000	1,628		2.1%
2010	1,484		−8.8%
2020	1,316		−11.3%
U.S. Decennial Census

=== 2010 census ===
As of the census of 2010, there were 1,484 people, 575 households, and 368 families living in the city. The population density was 894.0 inhabitants per square mile (345.2/km^{2}). There were 688 housing units at an average density of 414.5 per square mile (160.0/km^{2}). The racial makeup of the city was 94.3% White, 1.8% African American, 0.3% Native American, 0.4% Asian, 0.1% Pacific Islander, 0.9% from other races, and 2.3% from two or more races. Hispanic or Latino of any race were 1.7% of the population.

There were 575 households, of which 32.0% had children under the age of 18 living with them, 44.2% were married couples living together, 13.0% had a female householder with no husband present, 6.8% had a male householder with no wife present, and 36.0% were non-families. 28.3% of all households were made up of individuals, and 13.4% had someone living alone who was 65 years of age or older. The average household size was 2.48 and the average family size was 3.00.

The median age in the city was 42.4 years. 23.9% of residents were under the age of 18; 6.8% were between the ages of 18 and 24; 22.3% were from 25 to 44; 29.5% were from 45 to 64; and 17.4% were 65 years of age or older. The gender makeup of the city was 49.5% male and 50.5% female.

=== 2000 census ===
As of the census of 2000, there were 1,628 people, 612 households, and 417 families living in the city. The population density was 1,004.3 inhabitants per square mile (387.8/km^{2}). There were 717 housing units at an average density of 442.3 per square mile (170.8/km^{2}). The racial makeup of the city was 95.76% White, 1.29% African American, 0.06% Native American, 0.31% Asian, 0.06% Pacific Islander, 0.43% from other races, and 2.09% from two or more races. Hispanic or Latino of any race were 1.29% of the population.

There were 612 households, out of which 33.7% had children under the age of 18 living with them, 57.4% were married couples living together, 6.7% had a female householder with no husband present, and 31.7% were non-families. 28.8% of all households were made up of individuals, and 16.0% had someone living alone who was 65 years of age or older. The average household size was 2.48 and the average family size was 3.06.

In the city the population was spread out, with 25.7% under the age of 18, 6.8% from 18 to 24, 25.6% from 25 to 44, 22.2% from 45 to 64, and 19.7% who were 65 years of age or older. The median age was 39 years. For every 100 females, there were 91.8 males. For every 100 females aged 18 and over, there were 88.8 males.

The median income for a household in the city was $33,819, and the median income for a family was $41,563. Males had a median income of $28,942 versus $19,318 for females. The per capita income for the city was $14,126. About 6.2% of families and 9.6% of the population were below the poverty line, including 8.8% of those under age 18 and 10.9% of those age 65 or over.

== Climate ==
Sweet Springs has a typical temperate climate. As with most continental climates, the area has four seasons. Springs here are noted for their rainy days and variable temperatures. Thunderstorms are common and tornadoes occur during this time of year. Summers are usually hot and dry, with droughts occurring during several summers. Autumns are usually cool and rainy, although several days of warm weather are not uncommon. Winters are generally cold, with accumulating snow several days of the winter season. Although not as common, ice storms can and do occur as well.

Climate data for Sweet Springs, Missouri (1991–2020 normals, extremes 1941–present)
Month	Jan	Feb	Mar	Apr	May	Jun	Jul	Aug	Sep	Oct	Nov	Dec	Year
Record high °F (°C)	77 (25)	83 (28)	88 (31)	93 (34)	96 (36)	106 (41)	115 (46)	109 (43)	104 (40)	96 (36)	84 (29)	75 (24)	115 (46)
Mean daily maximum °F (°C)	38.4 (3.6)	44.4 (6.9)	55.5 (13.1)	66.0 (18.9)	75.7 (24.3)	84.4 (29.1)	88.7 (31.5)	87.3 (30.7)	79.9 (26.6)	68.6 (20.3)	54.8 (12.7)	43.3 (6.3)	65.6 (18.7)
Daily mean °F (°C)	27.9 (−2.3)	33.3 (0.7)	43.9 (6.6)	54.2 (12.3)	64.5 (18.1)	73.6 (23.1)	77.7 (25.4)	75.9 (24.4)	67.7 (19.8)	56.0 (13.3)	43.5 (6.4)	33.1 (0.6)	54.3 (12.4)
Mean daily minimum °F (°C)	17.4 (−8.1)	22.2 (−5.4)	32.4 (0.2)	42.3 (5.7)	53.3 (11.8)	62.7 (17.1)	66.6 (19.2)	64.5 (18.1)	55.5 (13.1)	43.3 (6.3)	32.1 (0.1)	23.0 (−5.0)	42.9 (6.1)
Record low °F (°C)	−24 (−31)	−22 (−30)	−20 (−29)	17 (−8)	29 (−2)	40 (4)	44 (7)	42 (6)	26 (−3)	14 (−10)	−8 (−22)	−23 (−31)	−24 (−31)
Average precipitation inches (mm)	1.48 (38)	1.96 (50)	2.91 (74)	4.38 (111)	5.49 (139)	4.45 (113)	5.49 (139)	4.36 (111)	4.00 (102)	3.37 (86)	2.55 (65)	2.10 (53)	42.54 (1,081)
Average snowfall inches (cm)	4.7 (12)	2.3 (5.8)	1.5 (3.8)	0.3 (0.76)	0.0 (0.0)	0.0 (0.0)	0.0 (0.0)	0.0 (0.0)	0.0 (0.0)	0.1 (0.25)	0.4 (1.0)	2.9 (7.4)	12.2 (31)
Average precipitation days (≥ 0.01 in)	6.3	5.8	9.2	10.5	11.7	9.3	8.7	8.0	7.5	8.2	6.7	6.2	98.1
Average snowy days (≥ 0.1 in)	2.8	1.9	0.8	0.1	0.0	0.0	0.0	0.0	0.0	0.1	0.5	2.0	8.2
Source: NOAA

== Education ==
Public education in Sweet Springs is administered by Sweet Springs R-VII School District.

Sweet Springs has a public library, the Sweet Springs Public Library.

== Notable people ==
- Pat Collins, catcher for 1927 New York Yankees
- Dorsey W. Shackleford, politician

== See also ==
- List of cities in Missouri
