= Henry Blosser House =

Historic house in Missouri, United States

- U.S. National Register of Historic Places
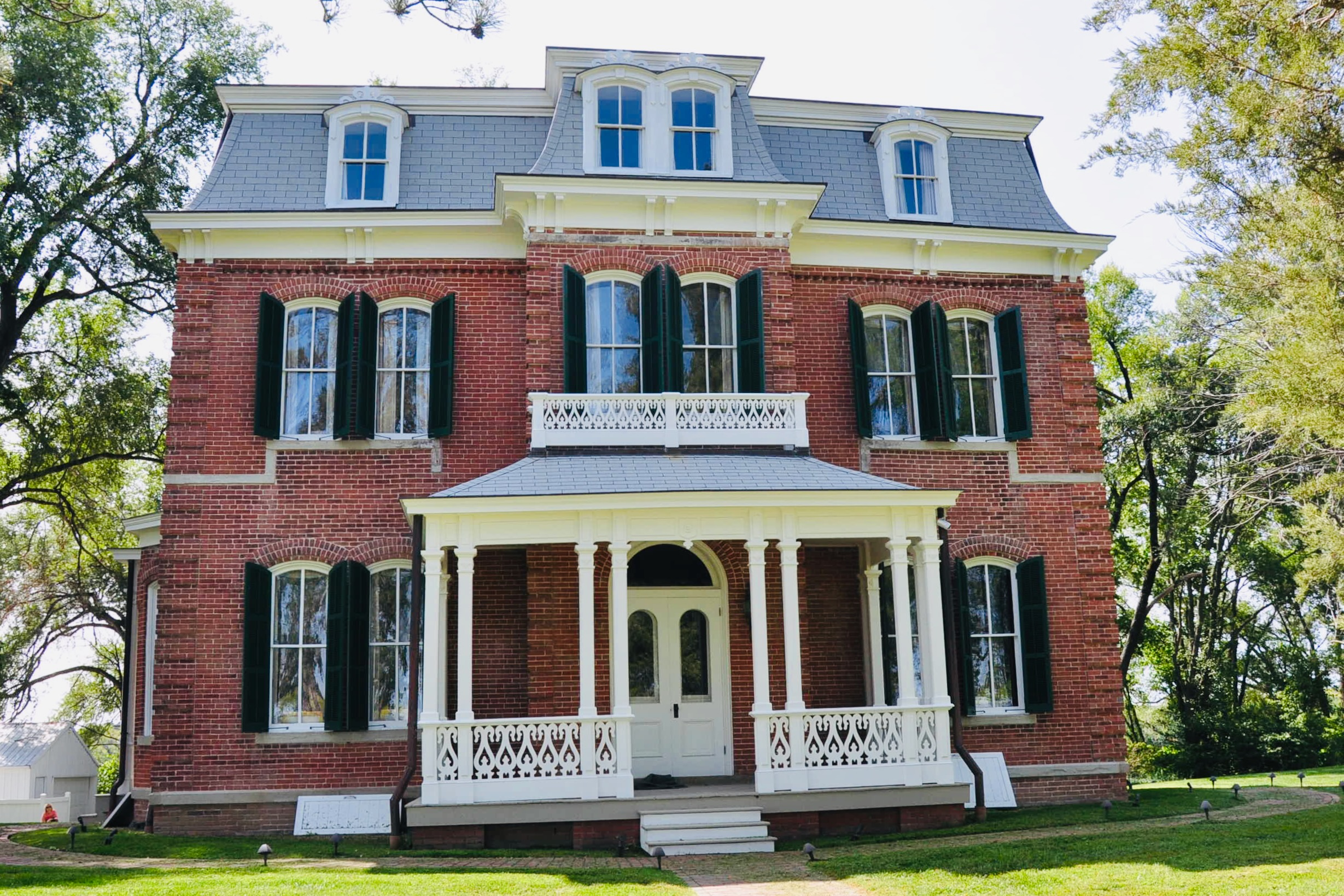
- Henry Blosser House in 2024

- Location within Missouri Location within the United States
- Location: East of Malta Bend off U.S. 65, near Malta Bend, Missouri
- Coordinates: 39°11′24″N 93°17′28″W
- Area: 10.3 acres (4.2 ha)
- Built: 1880
- Architect: Page, E.R.; Guy, John B.
- Architectural style: Second Empire
- NRHP reference No.: 78001675
- Added to NRHP: December 29, 1978

Henry Blosser House is a historic home located near Malta Bend, Saline County, Missouri. It was built in 1880, and is a three-story, Second Empire style red-orange brick farmhouse. It features a projecting central pavilion, a bell-cast mansard roof, polychrome shingles, and decorative porches. Also on the property are two contributing outbuildings and a three-level frame barn.

It was added to the National Register of Historic Places in 1978.

In 2014, the property was purchased by Dr. Arthur and Carolyn Elman. At the time the property was in a significant state of disrepair and had been placed on Missouri Preservation’s endangered properties list. Elmans hired interior designer Kelee Katillac to oversee rehabilitation of the house and barn. The mansion, now known as the Blosser-Elman Museum of Decorative Arts, is slated for opening in 2024.
