= Santa Fe Trail – Grand Pass Trail Segments =

- U.S. National Register of Historic Places
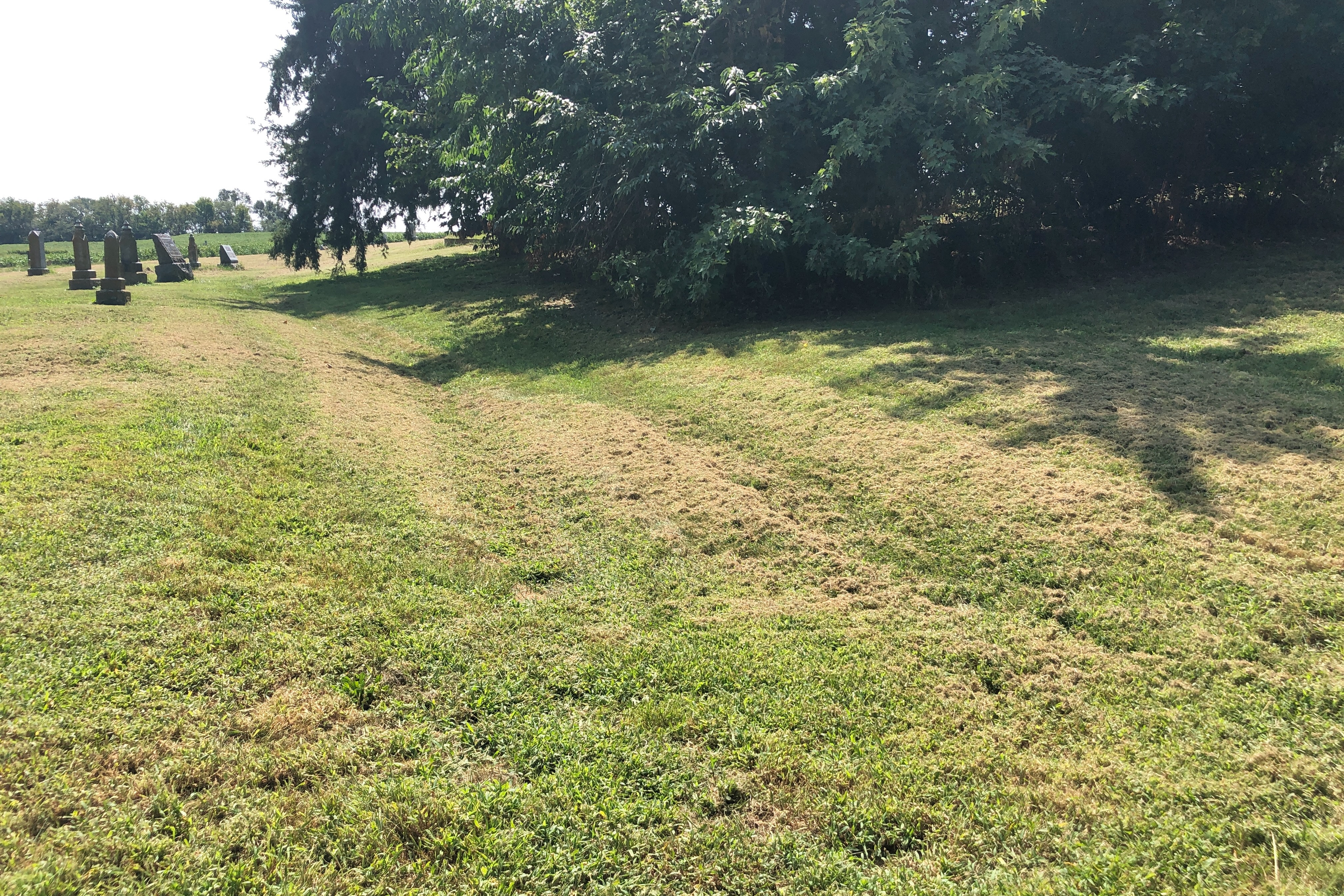
- Westernmost rut in 2024

- Location within Missouri Location within the United States
- Location: Junction of US 65 and County Road T, Grand Pass, Missouri
- Coordinates: 39°11′43″N 93°26′29″W
- Area: less than one acre
- MPS: Santa Fe Trail MPS
- NRHP reference No.: 94000324
- Added to NRHP: April 21, 1994

Santa Fe Trail – Grand Pass Trail Segments are three historic Santa Fe Trail segments located at Grand Pass, Saline County, Missouri. The three trail rut segments are located within Maple Hill Cemetery and near Grand Pass Methodist Church. They date to 1821–1827.

It was added to the National Register of Historic Places in 1994.
