= First Christian Church (Sweet Springs, Missouri) =

Historic church in Missouri, United States

- U.S. National Register of Historic Places
- Location within Missouri Location within the United States
- Location: 400 Bridge St., Sweet Springs, Missouri
- Coordinates: 38°57′46″N 93°25′9″W
- Area: less than one acre
- Built: 1882-1883
- NRHP reference No.: 80002394
- Added to NRHP: September 12, 1980

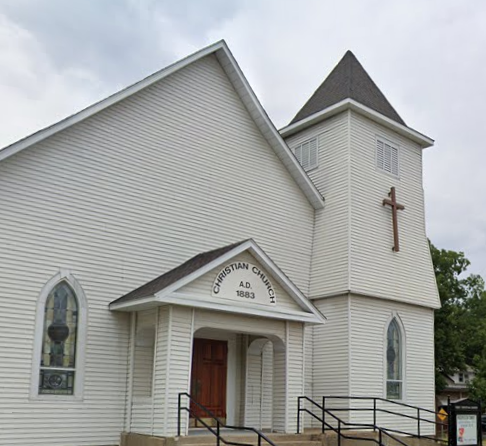
Church on 400 Bridge St as seen from the road.

First Christian Church is a historic 180-year-old Christian church located at 400 Bridge Street in Sweet Springs, Saline County, Missouri. It was built in 1882–1883 and is a one-story frame building measuring 45 feet by 60 feet. It is sheathed in weatherboard and features stained glass lancet windows and a two-story, square, bell tower.

The church was damaged by a tornado on 18th, 1882, and had to be rebuilt.

It was added to the National Register of Historic Places in 1980.
