= George A. Murrell House =

Historic house in Missouri, United States

- U.S. National Register of Historic Places
- Location within Missouri Location within the United States
- Location: 0.75 miles (1.21 km) east and 0.5 miles (0.80 km) north of MO E and H, near Napton, Missouri
- Coordinates: 39°2′17″N 93°4′25″W
- Area: less than one acre
- Built: 1854
- Architectural style: Greek Revival
- MPS: Antebellum Resources of Johnson, Lafayette, Pettis, and Saline Counties MPS
- NRHP reference No.: 97001435
- Added to NRHP: November 14, 1997

George A. Murrell House, also known as Oak Grove, is a historic home located near Napton, Saline County, Missouri. It was built in 1854, and is a two-story, Greek Revival style timber frame I-house with a two-story rear ell. It sits on a limestone block foundation and has a hipped roof. The front facade features a full-height front portico.

It was added to the National Register of Historic Places in 1997.
