= Arrow Rock Ferry Landing =

- U.S. National Register of Historic Places
- U.S. Historic district
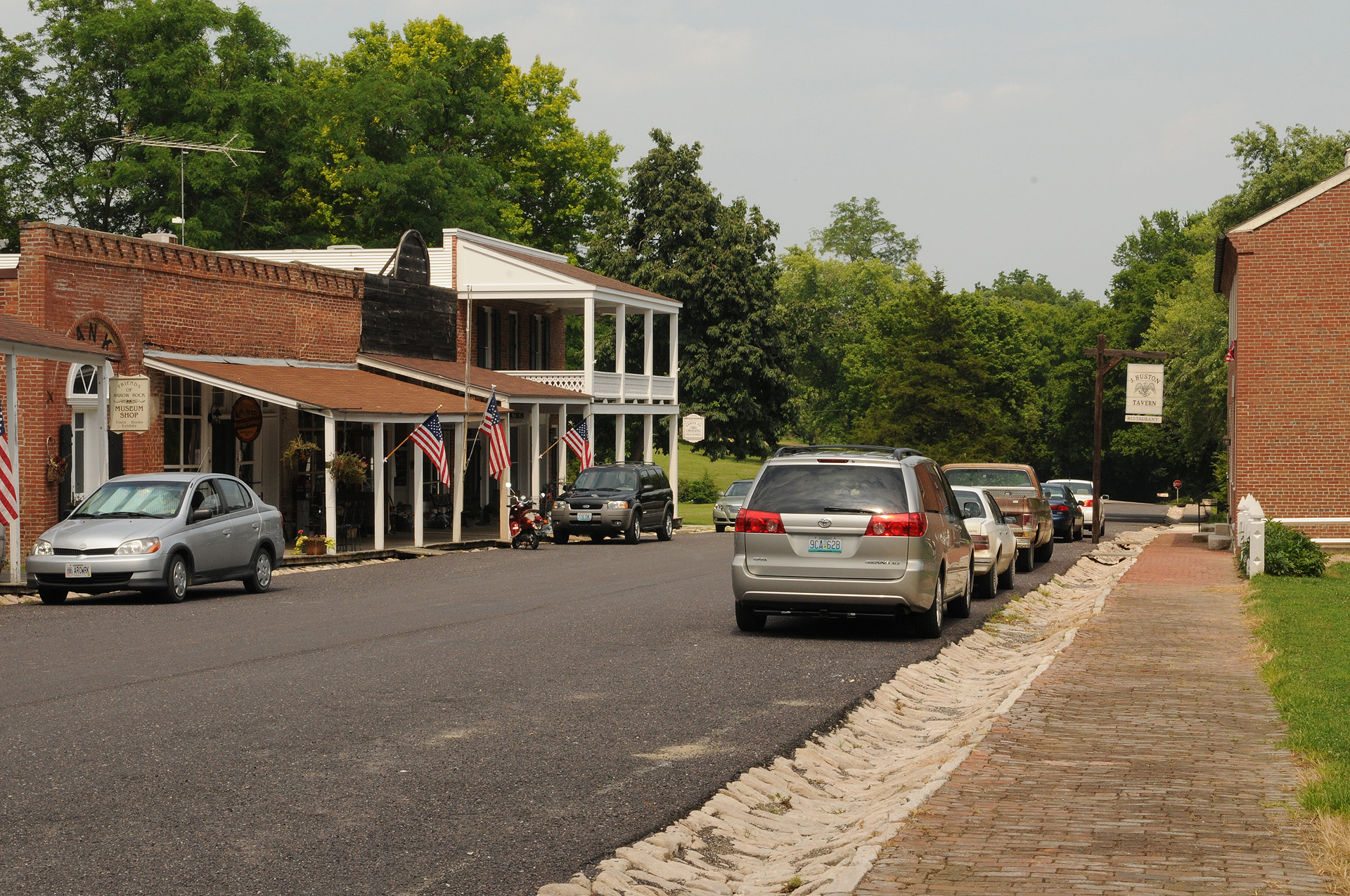

- Location within Missouri Location within the United States
- Location: Northern extension of 2nd St., Arrow Rock, Missouri
- Coordinates: 39°04′27″N 92°56′37″W
- Built: 1821, 1827
- MPS: Santa Fe Trail MPS
- NRHP reference No.: 08000664
- Added to NRHP: May 1, 2013

The Arrow Rock Ferry Landing had significance by 1821, when Santa Fe bound trading caravans departing from Franklin began crossing at the ferry.

It was listed on the National Register of Historic Places in 2013.

The site can be visited. A trail from the site goes up onto private property however.

Also listed on the National Register are other sites associated with the historic Santa Fe Trail.
