= Van Meter State Park =

State Park in Missouri, United States

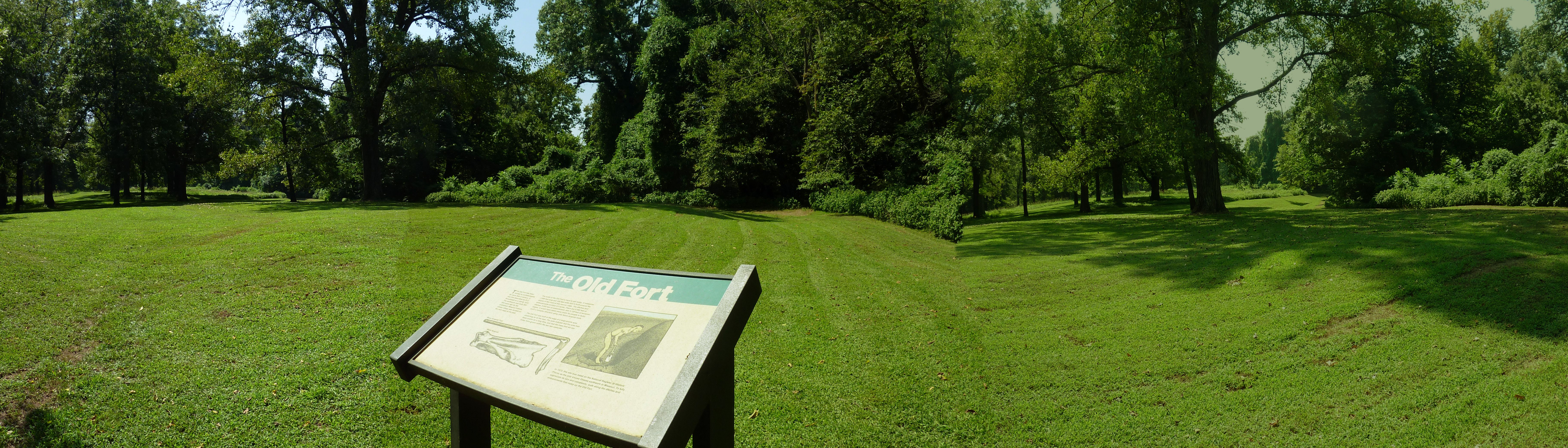
- Missouri tribe fort at the park

- Location within Missouri Location within the United States
- Location: Saline County, Missouri, United States
- Coordinates: 39°15′32″N 93°15′43″W
- Area: 1,104.63 acres (447.03 ha)
- Elevation: 663 ft (202 m)
- Established: 1932
- Administrator: Missouri Department of Natural Resources
- Visitors: 30,732 (in 2023)
- Website: Official website
- Van Meter State Park Combination Building
- U.S. National Register of Historic Places
- Nearest city: Marshall, Missouri
- Area: Less than one acre
- Built: 1935
- Built by: Civilian Conservation Corps; National Park Service
- MPS: ECW Architecture in Missouri State Parks 1933-1942 TR
- NRHP reference No.: 85000537
- Added to NRHP: February 27, 1985
- Van Meter State Park Shelter Building
- U.S. National Register of Historic Places
- Nearest city: Marshall, Missouri
- Area: Less than one acre
- Built: 1935
- Built by: Civilian Conservation Corps; National Park Service
- MPS: ECW Architecture in Missouri State Parks 1933-1942 TR
- NRHP reference No.: 85000538
- Added to NRHP: February 28, 1985

Van Meter State Park is a public recreation area on the Missouri River in Saline County, Missouri. The state park consists of 1,105 acres (447 ha) of hills, ravines, fresh water marsh, fens, and bottomland and upland forests in an area known as The Pinnacles The park has several archaeological sites, a cultural center, and facilities for camping, hiking, and fishing. It is managed by the Missouri Department of Natural Resources.

== History ==
The park and surrounding lands were once the home of the Native American tribe known to French settlers as “Oumessourit,” or Missouri Indians. Signs of the land's first occupants include the remnants of a Native American village, known as the Utz Site, a sizeable earthworks named Old Fort, and a mound field. Utz Site and Old Fort are included in the National Register of Historic Places.

The park originated when Annie Vanmeter deeded 369 acres to the state in 1932. The Civilian Conservation Corps was active in the park from 1934 to 1935. The large shelter house and the small shelter house in the Walnut Grove that survive from that era have been added to the National Register of Historic Places.

== Activities and amenities ==
The area's native history is interpreted in the park's cultural center through exhibits and murals. Park recreational activities include camping, hiking, and fishing on an 18-acre (7.3 ha) lake.
