= Malta Bend, Missouri =

- City
- Location of Malta Bend, Missouri
- Coordinates: 39°11′38″N 93°21′49″W
- Country: United States
- State: Missouri
- County: Saline

Area
  - Total: 0.25 sq mi (0.65 km^{2})
  - Land: 0.25 sq mi (0.65 km^{2})
  - Water: 0 sq mi (0.00 km^{2})
- Elevation: 699 ft (213 m)

Population (2020)
  - Total: 187
  - Density: 740.1/sq mi (285.74/km^{2})
- Time zone: UTC-6 (Central (CST))
  - Summer (DST): UTC-5 (CDT)
- ZIP code: 65339
- Area code: 660
- FIPS code: 29-45632
- GNIS feature ID: 2396734

Malta Bend is a city in Saline County, Missouri, United States. The population was 250 at the 2010 census.

== History ==
Malta Bend was platted in 1867. The community was named after a nearby meander on the Missouri River where steamer Malta sank. A post office called Malta Bend has been in operation since 1860.

The Henry Blosser House and Plattner Archeological Site are listed on the National Register of Historic Places.

== Geography ==
According to the United States Census Bureau, the city has a total area of 0.25 square miles (0.65 km^{2}), all land.

The land is surrounded on three sides by the Missouri River. The average alluvial soil depth (top soil) is 25 ft.

== Demographics ==
Historical population
Census	Pop.	Note	%±
1880	412		—
1890	449		9.0%
1900	431		−4.0%
1910	399		−7.4%
1920	442		10.8%
1930	429		−2.9%
1940	355		−17.2%
1950	414		16.6%
1960	338		−18.4%
1970	342		1.2%
1980	292		−14.6%
1990	289		−1.0%
2000	249		−13.8%
2010	250		0.4%
2020	187		−25.2%
U.S. Decennial Census

=== 2010 census ===
As of the census of 2010, there were 250 people, 98 households, and 69 families living in the city. The population density was 1,000.0 inhabitants per square mile (386.1/km^{2}). There were 110 housing units at an average density of 440.0 per square mile (169.9/km^{2}). The racial makeup of the city was 96.4% White, 1.2% African American, 1.6% from other races, and 0.8% from two or more races. Hispanic or Latino of any race were 2.0% of the population.

There were 98 households, of which 35.7% had children under the age of 18 living with them, 50.0% were married couples living together, 14.3% had a female householder with no husband present, 6.1% had a male householder with no wife present, and 29.6% were non-families. 28.6% of all households were made up of individuals, and 10.2% had someone living alone who was 65 years of age or older. The average household size was 2.55 and the average family size was 3.09.

The median age in the city was 39.6 years. 25.2% of residents were under the age of 18; 8.8% were between the ages of 18 and 24; 26% were from 25 to 44; 27.2% were from 45 to 64; and 12.8% were 65 years of age or older. The gender makeup of the city was 49.6% male and 50.4% female.

=== 2000 census ===
As of the census of 2000, there were 249 people, 93 households, and 66 families living in the town. The population density was 948.8 inhabitants per square mile (366.3/km^{2}). There were 104 housing units at an average density of 396.3 per square mile (153.0/km^{2}). The racial makeup of the town was 97.99% White, 1.61% African American, and 0.40% from two or more races.

There were 93 households, out of which 34.4% had children under the age of 18 living with them, 55.9% were married couples living together, 8.6% had a female householder with no husband present, and 29.0% were non-families. 28.0% of all households were made up of individuals, and 12.9% had someone living alone who was 65 years of age or older. The average household size was 2.68 and the average family size was 3.26.

In the town the population was spread out, with 34.1% under the age of 18, 7.2% from 18 to 24, 26.1% from 25 to 44, 18.9% from 45 to 64, and 13.7% who were 65 years of age or older. The median age was 32 years. For every 100 females there were 112.8 males. For every 100 females age 18 and over, there were 102.5 males.

The median income for a household in the town was $27,250, and the median income for a family was $34,063. Males had a median income of $28,611 versus $21,563 for females. The per capita income for the town was $14,403. About 13.3% of families and 11.3% of the population were below the poverty line, including 14.8% of those under the age of eighteen and 4.7% of those 65 or over.

== Education ==
It is in the Malta Bend R-V School District.
