= Old Fort (Miami, Missouri) =

- U.S. National Register of Historic Places
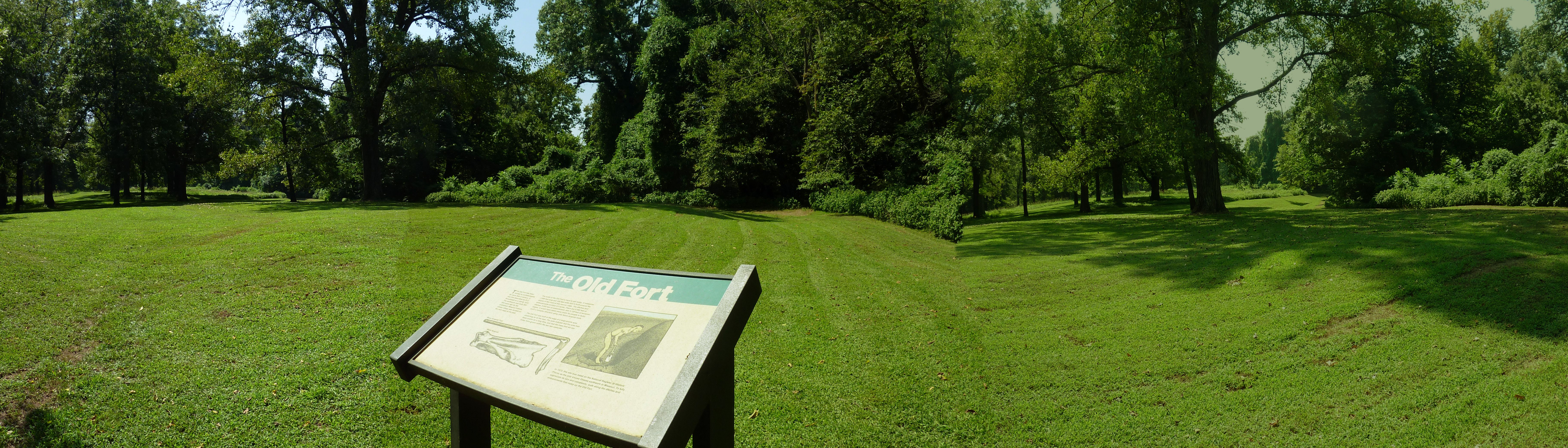

- Location within Missouri Location within the United States
- Location: Van Meter State Park, near Miami, Missouri
- Coordinates: 39°16′22″N 93°15′49″W
- Area: 7 acres (2.8 ha)
- NRHP reference No.: 72000731
- Added to NRHP: January 13, 1972

Old Fort, also known as Missouri Archaeological Survey Number 23SA104, is a historic archaeological site located at Van Meter State Park near Miami, Saline County, Missouri. It was first identified in 1879. It is an earthwork embankment dating to the period just before and/or during contact with the first Euro-American explorers.

It was added to the National Register of Historic Places in 1972.
