= Miami, Missouri =

- City
- Location of Miami, Missouri
- Coordinates: 39°19′22″N 93°13′33″W
- Country: United States
- State: Missouri
- County: Saline

Area
  - Total: 0.63 sq mi (1.63 km^{2})
  - Land: 0.56 sq mi (1.45 km^{2})
  - Water: 0.073 sq mi (0.19 km^{2})
- Elevation: 748 ft (228 m)

Population (2020)
  - Total: 152
  - Density: 272.1/sq mi (105.05/km^{2})
- Time zone: UTC-6 (Central (CST))
  - Summer (DST): UTC-5 (CDT)
- ZIP code: 65344
- Area code: 660
- FIPS code: 29-47684
- GNIS feature ID: 2395108

Miami (/maɪˈæmə/ my-AM-mə) is a city in Saline County, Missouri, United States. As of the 2020 census, Miami had a population of 152.

== History ==
Miami was originally called Greenville, under which name it was platted in 1838. A post office called Miami has been in operation since 1838. The present name is after the Miami Indians.

The Fisher-Gabbert Archeological Site, Guthrey Archeological Site, and Old Fort are listed on the National Register of Historic Places.

== Geography ==
According to the United States Census Bureau, the city has a total area of 0.63 square miles (1.63 km^{2}), of which 0.56 square miles (1.45 km^{2}) is land and 0.07 square miles (0.18 km^{2}) is water.

== Demographics ==
Historical population
Census	Pop.	Note	%±
1870	742		—
1880	813		9.6%
1890	647		−20.4%
1900	581		−10.2%
1910	431		−25.8%
1920	372		−13.7%
1930	347		−6.7%
1940	275		−20.7%
1950	217		−21.1%
1960	156		−28.1%
1970	205		31.4%
1980	177		−13.7%
1990	142		−19.8%
2000	160		12.7%
2010	175		9.4%
2020	152		−13.1%
U.S. Decennial Census

=== 2010 census ===
As of the census of 2010, there were 175 people, 60 households, and 46 families living in the city. The population density was 312.5 inhabitants per square mile (120.7/km^{2}). There were 73 housing units at an average density of 130.4 per square mile (50.3/km^{2}). The racial makeup of the city was 97.7% White, 0.6% African American, 0.6% from other races, and 1.1% from two or more races. Hispanic or Latino of any race were 1.7% of the population.

There were 60 households, of which 40.0% had children under the age of 18 living with them, 58.3% were married couples living together, 13.3% had a female householder with no husband present, 5.0% had a male householder with no wife present, and 23.3% were non-families. 16.7% of all households were made up of individuals, and 6.6% had someone living alone who was 65 years of age or older. The average household size was 2.92 and the average family size was 3.37.

The median age in the city was 39.3 years. 27.4% of residents were under the age of 18; 8.6% were between the ages of 18 and 24; 20.5% were from 25 to 44; 31.4% were from 45 to 64; and 12% were 65 years of age or older. The gender makeup of the city was 46.9% male and 53.1% female.

=== 2000 census ===
As of the census of 2000, there were 160 people, 58 households, and 40 families living in the city. The population density was 285.2 inhabitants per square mile (110.1/km^{2}). There were 68 housing units at an average density of 121.2 per square mile (46.8/km^{2}). The racial makeup of the city was 96.88% White, 0.62% African American, 1.88% Native American, 0.62% from other races. Hispanic or Latino of any race were 3.75% of the population.

There were 58 households, out of which 34.5% had children under the age of 18 living with them, 50.0% were married couples living together, 13.8% had a female householder with no husband present, and 31.0% were non-families. 24.1% of all households were made up of individuals, and 8.6% had someone living alone who was 65 years of age or older. The average household size was 2.76 and the average family size was 3.15.

In the city the population was spread out, with 32.5% under the age of 18, 6.9% from 18 to 24, 30.0% from 25 to 44, 22.5% from 45 to 64, and 8.1% who were 65 years of age or older. The median age was 34 years. For every 100 females, there were 88.2 males. For every 100 females age 18 and over, there were 89.5 males.

The median income for a household in the city was $27,750, and the median income for a family was $36,042. Males had a median income of $27,000 versus $13,750 for females. The per capita income for the city was $15,055. About 20.5% of families and 26.1% of the population were below the poverty line, including 42.6% of those under the age of eighteen and none of those 65 or over.

== Education ==
It is in the Miami R-I School District, an elementary school district.
