= List of museums in Missouri =

This list of museums in Missouri encompasses museums which are defined for this context as institutions (including non-profit organizations, government entities, and private businesses) that collect and care for objects of cultural, artistic, scientific, or historical interest and make their collections or related exhibits available for public viewing. Museums that exist only in cyberspace (i.e., virtual museums) are not included. Also included are non-profit and university art galleries.

== Museums ==
Name	Town/City	County	Region	Type	Summary
1827 Log Courthouse	Independence	Jackson	Northwest	Historic site	Mercantile operation, home and gathering place for the early Mormon settlers in Independence
1859 Jail, Marshal's Home & Museum	Independence	Jackson	Northwest	Prison	Operated by the Jackson County Historical Society
Adair County Historical Society Museum	Kirksville	Adair	Northeast	Local history	website
Adamson Cabin	Mt. Vernon	Lawrence	Southwest	Historic house	
Agency Ford Museum	Agency	Buchanan	Northwest	Local history	Located in the Agency Community Center and open by appointment
Ancient Ozarks Natural History Museum	Ridgedale, Missouri	Taney	Southwest	Natural History and Paleontology, and local history	website Part of the Big Cedar Lodge resort
Air and Military Museum of the Ozarks	Springfield	Greene	Southwest	Aviation	website
Albrecht-Kemper Museum of Art	Saint Joseph	Buchanan	Northwest	Art	Collections of 18th, 19th, 20th and 21st-century American art
Amoureux House	Ste. Genevieve	Ste. Genevieve	Southeast	Historic house	Late 18th-century house
Andrew County Museum & Historical Society	Savannah	Andrew	Northwest	Local history	website, includes collection of Navajo rugs and Kewpie dolls
Anheuser Estate	Kimmswick	Jefferson	Northeast	Historic house	Mansion and summer home of the Anheuser family
Archery Hall of Fame and Museum	Springfield	Greene	Southwest	Sports	Located on the upper floor of Bass Pro Shops Outdoor World, history of archery and bowhunting in America, includes Fred Bear memorabilia
Arrow Rock State Historic Site	Arrow Rock	Saline	Northwest	Open-air	Includes a museum of local history and the George Caleb Bingham House
Ashby-Hodge Gallery of American Art	Fayette	Howard	Northwest	Art	website, part of Central Methodist University, located on the first floor of Classic Hall, present 3 to 5 shows a year
Audrain County Historical Society	Mexico	Audrain	Northeast	Multiple	website, complex includes Graceland Museum, a historic 1857 mansion, the American Saddlebred Horse Museum, the 1903 Country School and the Country Church
Augusta Historic Museum	Augusta	St. Charles	Northeast	Local history	Operated in the August Sehrt House
Auto World Museum	Fulton	Callaway	Central	Automotive	website, vintage and classic cars and memorabilia
Barton County Historical Society Museum	Lamar	Barton	Southwest	Local history	Located in the basement of the Barton County Courthouse
Bates County Museum	Butler	Bates	Southwest	Local history	website, operated by the Bates County Historical Society, includes Victorian period rooms, displays on Osage culture, area settlers, Civil War, coal mining, railroads, author Robert Heinlein
Battle of Athens State Historic Site	Revere	Clark	Northeast	Military	Civil War
Battle of Lexington State Historic Site	Lexington	Lafayette	Northwest	Military	Civil War
Belton, Grandview and Kansas City Railroad	Belton	Cass	Northwest	Railroad	Short line passenger heritage railroad and museum, formerly the Kansas City Railroad Museum
Ben Ferrel Museum	Platte City	Platte	Northwest	Historic house	website, Victorian period house, operated by the Platte County, Missouri Historical & Genealogical Society
Benton County Museum	Warsaw	Benton	Central	Local history	website, operated by the Benton County Historical Society
Big River Train Town	Hannibal	Marion	Northeast	Railroad	Model train store and museum
Bingham-Waggoner Estate	Independence	Jackson	Northwest	Historic house	Victorian mansion once owned by artist George Caleb Bingham
Black Archives Museum	Saint Joseph	Buchanan	Northwest	History	website, area African American history
Bollinger County Museum of Natural History	Marble Hill	Bollinger	Southeast	Natural history	website, fossils, Native American artifacts, Lewis & Clark exhibit, Civil War history, Will Mayfield College history
Bollinger Mill State Historic Site	Burfordville	Cape Girardeau	Southeast	Mill	1867 working mill
Bonebrake Center of Nature and History	Salem	Dent	Southwest	Multiple	website, 1880s Bonebrake-McMurtrey House, nature exhibits and programs, 12 acre nature reserve
Bonnell Museum	Weston	Platte	Northwest	Local history	19th-century period house and farm life
Bonniebrook Gallery, Museum, and Homestead	Walnut Shade	Taney	Southwest	Biographical	website, home and museum of Rose O'Neill, creator of Kewpie dolls, operated by the Bonniebrook Historical Society
Bootheel Youth Museum, Malden, MO	Malden	Dunklin	Southeast	Children's	website
Bothwell Lodge State Historic Site	Sedalia	Pettis	Central	Historic house	31-room, 12,000-square-foot lodge with various eccentric construction details
Branson Dinosaur Museum	Branson	Taney	Southwest	Natural history	website, life-size dinosaur figures, skeletons, fossils
Branson Military Museum	Branson	Taney	Southwest	Military	website, weapons, historical artifacts from conflicts spanning the Civil War to present day, military uniforms, military toys and action figures
Burgess-How House	Kimmswick	Jefferson	Northeast	Historic house	1840s period farmhouse, operated by the Kimmswick Historical Society
Bushwacker Jail Museum	Nevada	Vernon	Southwest	Prison	website, operated by the Vernon County Historical Society; old jail and 1880s jailor's home
Bushwacker Museum	Nevada	Vernon	Southwest	Local history	website, operated by the Vernon County Historical Society
Calaboose	Springfield	Greene	Southwest	Police	website, 1891 former jail housing a police museum
Calico Cupboard Toy Sewing Machine Museum	Mountain View	Howell	Southeast	Commodity	Collection of toy sewing machines
Camden County Museum	Linn Creek	Camden	Central	Local history	website, operated by the Camden County Historical Society
Cameron Depot Museum	Cameron	Linn	Northwest	Railroad	website, operated by the Cameron Historical Society
Cape River Heritage Museum	Cape Girardeau	Cape Girardeau	Southeast	Local history	website
Center of Creative Arts (COCA)	University City	St. Louis	Northeast	Art	website, community visual and performing arts center
Centralia Historical Society Museum	Centralia	Boone	Central	Local history	website
Chaffee Historical Society Museum	Chaffee	Scott	Southeast	Local history	website
Champ Clark House	Bowling Green	Pike	Northeast	Historic house	Also known as Honeyshuck, home of Congressman Champ Clark
Chariton County Museum	Salisbury	Chariton	Northwest	Local history	website, operated by the Chariton County Historical Society
Children's Peace Pavilion	Independence	Jackson	Northwest	Children's	Designed to teach concepts of personal peace, social peace, international peace, and environmental peace to children ages 12 and under
Christian County Museum	Ozark	Christian	Southwest	Local history	website, operated by the Christian County Historical Society
Clay County Historical Society Museum	Liberty	Clay	Northwest	Local history	Includes pharmacy items, weapons, dolls, household items, arrowheads, historic doctor's office, period rooms, tools, agricultural equipment
Coal Miners Museum	Novinger	Adair	Northeast	Mining	Area coal mining, includes simulated coal mine and blacksmith shop, antique farm tools
Cole Camp Museum	Cole Camp	Benton	Central	Local history	website
Cole County Historical Society Museum	Jefferson City	Cole	Central	Local history	website, also Upschulte House, a historic house museum
Columbia College Galleries	Columbia	Boone	Central	Art	website, includes Greg Hardwick Gallery for 3-D and alternative media art, PaperInParticular for works on paper, Sidney Larson Gallery for professional work by nationally and internationally known artists and by outstanding Columbia College students
Commemorative Air Force Missouri Wing Museum	St. Charles	St. Charles	Northeast	Aviation	website, includes World War II aircraft and memorabilia, located at St. Charles County Smartt Airport
Community of Christ Museum	Independence	Jackson	Northwest	Religious	Part of the Independence Temple, history of the Community of Christ
Concordia Area Museum	Concordia	Lafayette	Central	Local history	
Concordia Historical Institute	Clayton	St. Louis	Northeast	Religious	Changing exhibits of area and Lutheran religious history, located at Concordia Seminary
Craft Studio	Columbia	Boone	Central	Art	website, contemporary crafts, exhibits works by University of Missouri students, faculty and staff, as well as local and national artists
Crane's Museum & Shoppes	Williamsburg]	Callaway	Central	Local history	Americana and local history
Crawford County Historical Museum	Cuba	Crawford	Southeast	Local history	website, operated by the Crawford County Historical Society
Crisp Museum	Cape Girardeau	Cape Girardeau	Southeast	Multiple	Part of Southeast Missouri State University, archaeology, history and fine art; also known as Southeast Missouri Regional Museum
Current River Heritage Museum	Doniphan	Ripley	Southwest	Local history	information, operated by the Ripley County Historical Society
Dade County Historical Society Museum	Greenfield	Dade	Southwest	Local history	
Dallas County Museum	Buffalo	Dallas	Central	Local history	website, operated by the Dallas County Historical Society; located in Buffalo Head Prairie Historical Park
Daniel Boone Home & Heritage Center	Defiance	St. Charles	Northeast	Living	Operated by Lindenwood University, life of Daniel Boone, simulated town consisting of over a dozen 19th century buildings
Daum Museum of Contemporary Art	Sedalia	Pettis	Central	Art	website
DeKalb County Historical Society Museum	Maysville	DeKalb	Northwest	Local history	website
Dent County Museum	Salem	Dent	Southwest	Local history	
Dexter Welcome Center Depot/Museum	Dexter	Stoddard	Southeast	Local history	
Deutschheim State Historic Site	Hermann	Gasconade	Northeast	Open-air	Mid-19th-century German immigrant family life
Dillard Mill State Historic Site	Davisville	Crawford	Southeast	Mill	Early 20th-century water-powered grist mill
Dillingham-Lewis Museum	Blue Springs	Jackson	Northwest	Local history	website, operated by the Blue Springs Historical Society
Discovery Center of Springfield	Springfield	Greene	Southwest	Science	Hands-on science exhibits
Doc's Museum	Jamesport	Daviess	Northwest	Automotive	website, antique cars and tractors
Doling Museum	Springfield	Greene	Southwest	Amusement	website, history of Doling Park, a former amusement park
Douglas County Museum	Ava	Douglas	Southwest	Local history	website, operated by the Douglas County (MO) Historical & Genealogical Society
Dunklin County Museum	Kennett	Dunklin	Southeast	Local history	Local history, open on Wednesdays
Ed Clark Museum of Missouri Geology	Rolla	Phelps	Southeast	Natural history	website, operated by the Missouri Department of Natural Resources, minerals, rocks, fossils, mammoth tusks
Edna Cuddy Memorial House	Bethany	Harrison	Northwest	Historic house	Operated by the Harrison County Historical Society, late 19th-century period house
Elgin Cottrell House	Clarksville	Pike	Northeast	Historic house	website, Victorian period house
Elizabeth Rozier Gallery	Jefferson City	Cole	Central	Art	Located in the Union Hotel at Jefferson Landing State Historic Site
Ellsinore Pioneer Museum	Ellsinore	Carter	Southwest	Local history	
Enns Entomology Museum	Columbia	Boone	Central	Natural history	website, insects, part of University of Missouri
Epps-Houts Museum	Poplar Bluff	Butler	Southeast	Art	Art from around the world including Africa, Korea, Saudi Arabia and Iran
Excelsior Springs Museum	Excelsior Springs	Clay	Northwest	Local history	website
Faust Village	Chesterfield	St. Louis	Northeast	Open-air	website, located in Faust Park, includes four homes and 16 structures spanning a period from 1840 to 1910
Fenton Historical Museum	Fenton	St. Louis	Northeast	Local history	website, operated by the Fenton Historical Society
Felix Vallé House State Historic Site	Ste. Genevieve	Ste. Genevieve	Southeast	Historic House	1830s Historic home and mercantile of Felix and Odile Vallé
First Missouri State Capitol State Historic Site	St. Charles	St. Charles	Northeast	History	Site of state's first government in the early 19th century
Flower Pentecostal Heritage Center Museum	Springfield	Greene	Southwest	Religious	website, history of American Pentecostalism
Fort Davidson State Historic Site	Pilot Knob	Iron	Southeast	Military	Park and museum, fort's old earthworks, two Confederate burial trenches and a visitor center about the Battle of Fort Davidson during the Civil War
Fort Osage National Historic Landmark	Sibley	Jackson	Northwest	Military	1812 fort
Foundry Art Centre	St. Charles	St. Charles	Northeast	Art	Interdisciplinary art center with exhibitions
Frank Lloyd Wright House in Ebsworth Park	Kirkwood	St. Louis	Northeast	Historic house	1950s house designed by architect Frank Lloyd Wright
Frisco Depot Museum	Crocker	Pulaski	Central	Railroad	
Frenchtown Heritage Museum	St. Charles	St. Charles	Northeast	Local history	website
Gallery 210	Bellerive	St. Louis	Northeast	Art	website, part of University of Missouri–St. Louis
Gasconade County Historical Society Museum	Owensville	Gasconade	Northeast	Local history	website
General Daniel Bissell House	Bellefontaine Neighbors	St. Louis	Northeast	Historic house	website, early 19th-century home of General Daniel Bissell
Gen. John J. Pershing Boyhood Home State Historic Site	Laclede	Linn	Northeast	Historic house	Mid 19th-century boyhood home of General John J. Pershing
George Caleb Bingham Gallery	Columbia	Boone	Central	Art	website, gallery of the University of Missouri Art Department
George Washington Carver National Monument	Diamond	Newton	Southwest	Biographical	Park and 19th-century boyhood farm home of scientist George Washington Carver
Glenn House	Cape Girardeau	Cape Girardeau	Southeast	Historic house	Late Victorian period house
Glore Psychiatric Museum	Saint Joseph	Buchanan	Northwest	Medical	History of what was once known as the “State Lunatic Asylum No. 2”
Golden Missouri Pioneer Museum	Golden	Barry	Southwest	History	website, includes Early American Pattern glassware, Native American arrowheads and artifacts, minerals, and collections of pocket watches, baseball cards, Civil War and pioneer artifacts and tools
Granby Mining Museum	Granby	Newton	Southwest	Mining	
Grand River Historical Society Museum	Chillicothe	Livingston	Northwest	Local history	website
Grandview Depot Museum	Grandview	Jackson	Northwest	Railroad	Operated by the Grandview Historical Society
Gray/Campbell Farmstead	Springfield	Greene	Southwest	Historic house	website, mid 19th-century house, located in Nathanael Greene Park
Grundy County Museum	Trenton	Grundy	Northwest	Local history	website
Hain House	Boonville	Cooper	Central	Historic house	website, operated by the Friends of Historic Boonville, 19th-century house owned by one family
Hannibal History Museum	Hannibal	Marion	Northeast	Local history	website, operated by the Hannibal History Museum Foundation
Harlin Museum	West Plains	Howell	Southwest	Multiple	website, art and local history
Harold Bell Wright Museum	Pierce City	Lawrence	Southwest	Local history	website, author Harold Bell Wright and local history exhibits
Harry S Truman Birthplace State Historic Site	Lamar	Barton	Southwest	Historic house	Late 19th-century period birthplace home of President Harry Truman
Harry S. Truman National Historic Site	Grandview	Jackson	Northwest	Historic house	Late 19th-century Harry S. Truman Farm Home built by Harry Truman's maternal grandmother
Harry S. Truman National Historic Site	Independence	Jackson	Northwest	Historic house	Home of Harry S Truman from the 1919 until his death in 1972
Harry S Truman Office and Courtroom	Independence	Jackson	Northwest	Biographical	Office used by Harry S. Truman during his early political years, located in the Jackson County Courthouse
Harry S. Truman Presidential Library and Museum	Independence	Jackson	Northwest	Biographical	Papers, books, and other historical materials relating to the 33rd President of the United States Harry S Truman
Harry S. Truman Regional Visitor Center	Warsaw	Benton	Central	Multiple	Cultural and natural history of Truman Lake, environmental activities, the construction of Harry S. Truman Dam, the operation of the powerhouse, and the US Army Corps of Engineers
Haviland Museum	St. Charles	St. Charles	Northeast	Decorative arts	website, Haviland china collection
Hawken House	Webster Groves	St. Louis	Northeast	Historic house	website, operated by the Webster Groves Historical Society, Victorian Federal/Greek Revival style farmhouse
Henry County Museum	Clinton	Henry	Central	Open-air	website
Hermann Fire Company Museum	Hermann	Gasconade	Northeast	Firefighting	
Hickory County Museum	Hermitage	Hickory	Central	Local history	website, operated by the Hickory County Historical Society in the John Siddles Williams House
Higgerson School Historic Site	New Madrid	New Madrid	Southeast	School	website, 19th-century one room school
Historic Aircraft Restoration Museum	Maryland Heights	St. Louis	Northeast	Aviation	Located at Creve Coeur Airport, mostly fabric-covered historic aircraft and biplanes from the inter-war years
Historic Bethel German Colony	Bethel	Shelby	Northeast	Open-air	
Historic Hanley House	Clayton	St. Louis	Northeast	Historic house	website, Victorian period farmstead
Historical Society of Lee's Summit Museum	Lee's Summit	Jackson	Northwest	Local history	website, housed in a former post office
History Museum on the Square	Springfield	Greene	Southwest	Local history	website
Hollywood Wax Museum Branson	Branson	Taney	Southwest	Media	Wax figures of celebrities including movie stars, television personalities and music icons
Hulston Mill Park	Greenfield	Dade	Southwest	Mill	website, includes the historic Hulston Mill, operated by the Dade County Historical Society, and several log cabins
Hunter-Dawson State Historic Site	New Madrid	New Madrid	Southeast	Historic house	Mid-19th-century period mansion
Iron County Historical Society Museum	Arcadia	Iron	Southeast	Local history	website
James Farm	Kearney	Clay	Northwest	Biographical	website, birthplace of Jesse James
J.C. Penney Museum	Hamilton	Caldwell	Northwest	Biographical	website, information, life of James Cash Penney, founder of J. C. Penney stores
Jefferson Barracks Museums	Lemay	St. Louis	Northeast	Military	Two museums about the history of Jefferson Barracks Military Post
Jefferson Barracks Telephone Museum	Lemay	St. Louis	Northeast	History	Features telephones, telephone-related equipment and memorabilia, located in Jefferson Barracks Historic Park
Jesse James Home Museum	Saint Joseph	Buchanan	Northwest	Biographical	House where Jesse James was gunned down
Jefferson Landing State Historic Site	Jefferson City	Cole	Central	Transportation	Exhibits on river transportation, site also includes Elizabeth Rozier Gallery
Jim's Journey	Hannibal	Marion	Northeast	African American	website, also known as the Huck Finn Freedom Center, life of the man who inspired Huck Finn's Jim, Hannibal's African American history and notable figures
John B Mahaffey Museum Complex	Fort Leonard Wood	Pulaski	Central	Military	website, includes US Army Chemical Corps Museum, US Army Engineer Museum, US Army Military Police Museum, Fort Leonard Wood Museum
John Colter Museum and Visitors Center	New Haven	Franklin	Northeast	Local history	Includes art exhibits featuring John Colter and the Lewis and Clark Expedition, Native American artifacts and Missouri River history
Johnson County Historic Complex	Warrensburg	Johnson	Southwest	Open-air	website, includes the Mary Miller Smiser Heritage Library & Museum, 1839 Johnson County Courthouse, a one-room school and an agriculture building; operated by the Johnson County Historical Society
Joplin Museum Complex	Joplin	Jasper	Southwest	Multiple	website, includes the Everett J. Ritchie Tri-State Mineral Museum, Dorothea B. Hoover Historical Museum, Empire District Electric Company Museum, the Joplin Sports Authority Sports Hall of Fame, and the National Historical Cookie Cutter Museum
Kemp Auto Museum	Chesterfield	St. Louis	Northeast	Automotive	website
Kimmswick Historical Society Museum	Kimmswick	Jefferson	Northeast	Local history	website
Kingdom of Callaway Historical Society Museum	Fulton	Callaway	Central	Local history	website
La Maison de Guibourd	Ste. Genevieve	Ste. Genevieve	Southeast	Historic House	French-Colonial home and gardens of Jacques Jean Rene Guibourd built in 1806 shows life as it was in the early 19th century, operated by the Foundation for Restoration of Ste. Genevieve, Inc.
Laclede County Historical Society Museum	Lebanon	Laclede	Central	Local history	Located in the former county jail
Laumeier Sculpture Park	Sunset Hills	St. Louis	Northeast	Art	105-acre (0.42 km^{2}) open-air museum with over 70 sculptures
Laura Ingalls Wilder Historic Home and Museum	Mansfield	Wright	Southwest	Biographical	Home of author Laura Ingalls Wilder from 1896 until her death in 1957
Lawrence County Historical Society Museum	Mount Vernon	Lawrence	Southwest	Local history	
Leila's Hair Museum	Independence	Jackson	Northwest	Commodity	Contains wreaths and jewelry containing, or made of, human hair dating before 1900
Lewis & Clark Boat House and Nature Center	St. Charles	St. Charles	Northeast	History	website, exhibits relating to the Lewis and Clark expedition, historic St. Charles, and the Missouri River ecosystem
Lewis County Historical Society Library & Museum	Canton	Lewis	Northeast	Local history	
Lexington Historical Museum	Lexington	Lafayette	Northwest	Local history	Located in a mid-19th-century church building, exhibits include steamboats, coal mining, Osage Indians and the Wentworth Military Academy
Liberty Jail	Liberty	Clay	Northwest	Jail	Former jail where Joseph Smith, Jr. and others were imprisoned from 1838 to 1839 during the Mormon War
Lincoln County Jail Museum	Troy	Lincoln	Northeast	Prison	Open for events by the Lincoln County Historical Society
Lone Jack Battlefield Museum	Lone Jack	Jackson	Northwest	Civil War	website, history of the Battle of Lone Jack and Missouri in the Civil War
Louis Bolduc House	Ste. Genevieve	Ste. Genevieve	Southeast	Historic house	Operated by The National Society of The Colonial Dames of America in the State of Missouri, French Colonial house
Louisiana Area Historical Museum	Louisiana	Pike	Northeast	Local history	
Lutheran Heritage Center & Museum	Altenburg	Perry	Southeast	Local history	website, operated by the Perry County Lutheran Historical Society, history and culture of the German Saxon immigration to East Perry County in the early 19th century
MAAPS Military Museum	Malden	Dunklin	Southeast	Military	website, located inside the Malden Regional Airport office building, history of Malden Army Airfield
Malden Historical Museum	Malden	Dunklin	Southeast	Local history	website
Maplewood	Columbia	Boone	Central	Historic house	Operated by the Boone County Historical Society, late 19th-century house
Margaret Harwell Art Museum	Poplar Bluff	Butler	Southeast	Art	website
Mark Twain Birthplace State Historic Site	Florida	Monroe	Northeast	Biographical	Two-room rented cabin where author Mark Twain was born
Mark Twain Boyhood Home & Museum	Hannibal	Marion	Northeast	Biographical	Complex includes author Mark Twain's 19th-century boyhood home and other historic houses
Marshall Welcome Center and Jim the Wonder Dog Museum	Marshall	Saline	Northwest	Local history	website, history of Jim the Wonder Dog
Mastodon State Historic Site	Imperial	Jefferson	Northeast	Archaeology	Site of Pleistocene ice age deposits and Clovis culture artifacts
May Gallery	Webster Groves	St. Louis	Northeast	Art	website, part of Webster University
McClure Archives and University Museum	Warrensburg	Johnson	Southwest	Multiple	Includes Middle East, Guatemalan and Native American artifacts, seashells, WW II collections, history of the University of Central Missouri
McDonald County Historical Museum	Pineville	McDonald	Southwest	Local history	website
Mid-Missouri Museum of Independent Telephone Pioneers	Blackwater	Cooper	Central	Technology	
Mildred Lane Kemper Art Museum	St. Louis	St. Louis	Northeast	Art	Part of Washington University in St. Louis, collections include 19th, 20th, and 21st-century European and American paintings, sculptures, prints, installations, and photographs
Miller County Museum	Tuscumbia	Miller	Central	Local history	website
Mississippi County Historical Museum	East Prairie	Mississippi	Southeast	Local history	Open during events and by appointment
Missouri Children's Museum	Columbia	Boone	Central	Children's	website
Missouri Civil War Museum	Lemay	St. Louis	Northeast	Military	State's role during the American Civil War
Missouri Farm Bureau Log Home	Jefferson City	Cole	Central	Historic house	website, 1850s log home, displays about the state's agricultural heritage over the last 150 years
Missouri Governor's Mansion	Jefferson City	Cole	Central	Historic house	1870s mansion
Missouri Mines State Historic Site	Park Hills	St. Francois	Southeast	Industry	Lead and zinc mining and geology
Missouri Sports Hall of Fame	Springfield	Greene	Southwest	Sports	Memorabilia of Missouri athletes and interactive displays
Missouri State Capitol	Jefferson City	Cole	Central	History	
Missouri State Museum	Jefferson City	Cole	Central	Multiple	Missouri history, natural history, and cultural resources history
Missouri State Penitentiary	Jefferson City	Cole	Central	Prison	Museum located on the second floor of the Jefferson City Convention & Visitors Bureau, guided tours of the historic former prison
Missouri Town 1855	Lee's Summit	Jackson	Northwest	Living	30-acre antebellum open-air museum shows 19th-century life
Missouri Veterinary Medical Foundation Museum	Jefferson City	Cole	Central	Medical	Operated by the Missouri Veterinary Medical Association
Molly Brown Birthplace & Museum	Hannibal	Marion	Northeast	Biographical	website, operated by the Hannibal History Museum Foundation, 19th-century birthplace home of activist Margaret Brown
Monroe County Museum	Paris	Monroe	Northeast	Local history	website, operated by the Monroe County Historical Society, located in the Monroe County Courthouse
Montauk State Park	Salem	Dent	Southwest	Mill	Tour of the 1896 Montauk Mill
Moore Home	Charleston	Mississippi	Southeast	Local history	website, operated by the Mississippi County Historical Society, Victorian period home with local history displays
Morgan County Historical Society Museum	Versailles	Morgan	Central	Local history	website, located in the Martin Hotel
Mormon Visitors Center	Independence	Jackson	Northwest	Religious	Experiences of Mormon settlers in Missouri between 1831 and 1839, importance of families, messages from modern prophets and the Book of Mormon
Museum of Anthropology	Columbia	Boone	Central	Anthropology	website, part of University of Missouri
Museum of Art and Archaeology	Columbia	Boone	Central	Art	Part of the University of Missouri, also Greek, Roman, and Near Eastern art works and artifacts
Museum of Missouri Military History	Jefferson City	Cole	Central	Military	
Museum of the Dog	Town and Country	St. Louis	Northeast	Art	website, collection of art devoted to the dog, operated by the American Kennel Club
Museum at the German School	Hermann	Gasconade	Northeast	Local history	website, operated by Historic Hermann
National Museum of Transportation	Kirkwood	St. Louis	Northeast	Transportation	Antique cars, boats, a plane, locomotives and railroad equipment
Nathan Boone Homestead State Historic Site	Ash Grove	Greene	Northeast	Historic house	1830s period home of Nathan Boone, son of Daniel Boone
National BB Gun Museum	Branson	Taney	Southwest	Sports	website, vintage BB guns, ads
National Churchill Museum	Fulton	Callaway	Central	Biographical	Life and times of Sir Winston Churchill, part of Westminster College, formerly the Winston Churchill Memorial and Library
National Frontier Trails Museum	Independence	Jackson	Northwest	History	website, history of America's principle western trails
National Military Heritage Museum	Saint Joseph	Buchanan	Northwest	Military	website
National Silk Art Museum	Weston	Platte	Northwest	Art	website, masterworks of French and English silk tapestries based on work by major artists from the 15th through the 20th century
New Madrid Historical Museum	New Madrid	New Madrid	Southeast	Local history	website
Newton County Historical Park	Neosho	Newton	Southwest	Open-air	Includes Newton County Historical Society Museum, Newton County School No. 111 and Log Cabin
Nicholas Beazley Aviation Museum	Marshall	Saline	Northwest	Aviation	website
Nodaway County Historical Society Museum	Maryville	Nodaway	Northwest	Local history	Local history and culture
NRA National Sporting Arms Museum	Springfield	Greene	Southwest	Sports	Located on the upper floor of Bass Pro Shops Outdoor World, history of hunting, over 1000 hunting rifles
Old Cooper County Jail & Hanging Barn	Boonville	Cooper	Central	Jail	website, operated by the Friends of Historic Boonville, 19th-century jail used until 1978
Old Stagecoach Stop	Waynesville	Pulaski	Central	Historic site	website, 19th-century hotel with rooms restored for different periods from 1854 to the present
Owens-Rogers Museum	Independence	Jackson	Northwest	Historic Landmark	website, Home of Lela Rogers and birthplace of actress/dancer Ginger Rogers, historic landmark property
Ozark Natural & Cultural Resource Center	Salem	Dent	Southwest	Multiple	website, local history, culture, industry, natural resources, art
Patee House	Saint Joseph	Buchanan	Northwest	Multiple	United States history, transportation vehicles, recreated streets of Old St. Joseph in the 1860s-1880s, Western art
Phelps County Museum	Rolla	Phelps	Southeast	Local history	website, operated by the Phelps County Historical Society, includes the 1838 Dillon Log House, the 1860 Limestone Block Jail, and the 1861 Courthouse
Pioneer Heritage Homestead	Doniphan	Ripley	Southwest	Open-air	website, 1865 log cabin museum, log barn and a blacksmith shop
Pioneer Spring Cabin	Independence	Jackson	Northwest	Historic house	1850s-period two-room log cabin
Pleasant Hill Historical Society Museum	Pleasant Hill	Cass	Northwest	Local history	website
Polk County Museum	Bolivar	Polk	Southwest	Local history	website
Pony Express Museum	Saint Joseph	Buchanan	Northwest	Transportation	History of the Pony Express
Poplar Bluff Historical Museum	Poplar Bluff	Butler	Southeast	Local history	Operated by the Butler County Historical Society
Poplar Bluff Railroad Museum	Poplar Bluff	Butler	Southeast	Railroad	website, includes model trail layout
Poplar Heights Farm	Butler	Bates	Southwest	Living	website, 1870s living history farm
Powers Museum	Carthage	Jasper	Southwest	Local history	website, open seasonally
Pulaski County Courthouse Museum	Waynesville	Pulaski	Central	Local history	website, operated by the Pulaski County Historical Society
Puppetry Arts Institute	Independence	Jackson	Northwest	Entertainment	website, puppet theater and museum with hand puppets and marionettes
The Rabbit hOle	North Kansas City	Clay	Northwest	Children'	website, Children's museum focusing on children's literature with immersive exhibits, workshop, a bookstore, and author events
Railroad Historical Museum	Springfield	Greene	Southwest	Railway	website, located in Grant Beach Park, includes a locomotive, baggage car, commuter car and caboose, railroad artifacts, model train layout
Ralph Foster Museum	Point Lookout	Taney	Southwest	Local history	Part of College of the Ozarks, history and culture of the Ozarks region
Randolph County Historical Museum	Moberly	Randolph	Northeast	Local history	website, operated by the Randolph County Historical Society
Ray County Museum	Richmond	Ray	Northwest	Local history	website, operated by the Ray County Historical Society
Raytown Historical Society Museum	Raytown	Jackson	Northwest	Local history	website
Red House Interpretive Center	Cape Girardeau	Cape Girardeau	Southeast	History	website, Missouri pioneers and life of community founder Louis Lorimier, as well as the visit of Meriwether Lewis and William Clark in November, 1803
Remember When Toy Museum & Historic Village	Canton	Lewis	Northeast	Toy	website, over 20,000 toys, antique cars, recreated 1800s village
Remington Nature Center	Saint Joseph	Buchanan	Northwest	Multiple	website, animals, plants, Native Americans, trappers, geology, Civil War history
Reynolds County Genealogy and Historical Society Museum	Ellington	Reynolds	Southeast	Local history	website
Ripley's Believe It or Not! Museum	Branson	Taney	Southwest	Amusement	
Riverbluff Cave	Springfield	Greene	Southwest	Natural history	Exhibit center with cave and worldwide fossils, also known as Missouri Institute of Natural Science
Robidoux Row Museum	Saint Joseph	Buchanan	Northwest	Local history	Operated by the Saint Joseph Historical Society, mid-19th-century apartment building with exhibits of the city's history
Rocheport Historical Museum	Rocheport	Boone	Central	Local history	Operated by Friends of Rocheport Society
Rockcliffe Mansion	Hannibal	Marion	Northeast	Historic house	Late 19th-century 13,500-square-foot (1,250 m2) Colonial Revival/Georgian-style mansion
Route 66 Museum	Lebanon	Laclede	Central	Local history	website, located in the Lebanon-Laclede County Library, includes recreations of a 1950s gas station and a classic diner, displays of antique cars, Route 66 books, magazines and videos
Route 66 State Park Visitors Center	Eureka	St. Louis	Northeast	Local history	The Visitors Center, in a historic Route 66 building, has exhibits on the Mother Road in the state of Missouri.
Ruth W. Towne Museum	Kirksville	Adair	Northeast	History	website, museum and visitor center of Truman State University, exhibits about the history of the university
Saxon Lutheran Memorial	Frohna	Perry	Southeast	Open-air	19th-century period log home and historic buildings
Softball Museum	Springfield	Greene	Southwest	Sports	website, located in the Killian Softball Complex, history of state's amateur softball
The Space Center	Bonne Terre	St. Francois	Southeast	Science	website, space memorabilia and artifacts
Springfield Art Museum	Springfield	Greene	Southwest	Art	website, collections include 19th, 20th, and 21st century American paintings, watercolor, sculpture and prints
Stars and Stripes Museum	Bloomfield	Stoddard	Southeast	Media	website, history of the United States Armed Forces military newspaper, the Stars and Stripes
State Historical Society of Missouri	Columbia	Boone	Central	Art	Changing art and history exhibits drawn from its collections
St. Charles County Historical Society Museum	St. Charles	St. Charles	Northeast	Local history	website, located in the 1830s Old Market House
St. Clair Historical Museum	St. Clair	Franklin	Northeast	Local history	website
St. Louis Kaplan Feldman Holocaust Museum	Creve Coeur	St. Louis	Northeast	History	website
St. Robert City Museum	St. Robert	Pulaski	Central	Local history	
Ste. Genevieve Museum	Ste. Genevieve	Ste. Genevieve	Southeast	Local history	website, local artifacts, art, antiques and oddities
Stephens College Historic Costume Gallery	Columbia	Boone	Central	Textile	website, located in Lela Raney Wood Hall
Stephens Museum	Fayette	Howard	Northwest	Multiple	website, part of Central Methodist University, archaeology, cultural anthropology, natural history, geology and paleontology, located on the second floor of T. Berry Smith Hall
Sterling Price Museum	Keytesville	Chariton	Northwest	Local history	website, artifacts of Governor and Civil War general Sterling Price, local history, collection of buttons, books, glassware, children's toys, housewares
Still National Osteopathic Museum	Kirksville	Adair	Northeast	Medical	website, part of A.T. Still University, national history of osteopathic medicine
St. Joseph Fire Museum	Saint Joseph	Buchanan	Northwest	Firefighting	website
St. Joseph Museum	Saint Joseph	Buchanan	Northwest	History	website, Native American collection, Lewis & Clark exhibits
St. Louis Mercantile Library	Bellerive	St. Louis	Northeast	Art	Library with free art and history exhibits from its collections
Taille de Noyer	Florissant	St. Louis	Northeast	Historic house	website, operated by the Florissant Valley Historical Society, early 19th-century house
Texas County Historical & Military Museum	Houston	Texas	Southeast	Local history	website, operated by the Texas County Genealogical & Historical Society
The Magic House, St. Louis Children's Museum	Kirkwood	St. Louis	Northeast	Children's	Hands-on learning experiences
Thomas Sappington House	Crestwood	St. Louis	Northeast	Historic house	Early 19th-century period house
Thornhill	Chesterfield	St. Louis	Northeast	Historic house	website, early 19th-century home of Frederick Bates, Missouri's second Governor
Titanic World's Largest Museum Attraction	Branson	Taney	Southwest	Maritime	Artifacts and history of the RMS Titanic
Townley House Museum	Chamois	Osage	Central	Historic house	Open by appointment
Truman State University Art Gallery	Kirksville	Adair	Northeast	Art	Professional and student exhibitions in the Ophelia Parrish Fine Arts Center
UCM Gallery of Art and Design	Warrensburg	Johnson	Southwest	Art	website, part of the University of Central Missouri
Ulysses S. Grant National Historic Site	Grantwood Village	St. Louis	Northeast	Biographical	Childhood home of Julia Grant, wife of President Ulysses S. Grant
Vaile Mansion	Independence	Jackson	Northwest	Historic house	website, 31 room elaborate Victorian mansion
Veterans Memorial Museum	Branson	Taney	Southwest	Military	website, 20th-century conflicts
Village at Boone Junction	Columbia	Boone	Central	Open-air	website, operated by the Boone County Historical Society, complex includes 1821 Gordon-Collins Cabin and 1890 Easley country store
Walt Disney Hometown Museum	Marceline	Linn	Northwest	Biographical	Walt Disney's childhood and family, railroad artifacts
Walters-Boone County Museum	Columbia	Boone	Central	Local history	website, operated by the Boone County Historical Society, also includes Montminy Art Gallery
Warren E. Hearnes Museum	Charleston	Mississippi	Southeast	Biographical	Museum about Governor Warren E. Hearnes, open for events
Washington Firehouse Museum	Washington	Franklin	Northwest	Firefighting	website, antique fire engines and vintage automobiles, operated by the Washington Historical Society
Washington Museum	Washington	Franklin	Northwest	Local history	website, operated by the Washington Historical Society
Watkins Woolen Mill State Park and State Historic Site	Lawson	Clay	Northwest	Living	1860s farm, 1860 woolen mill and gristmill, Watkins 1850 Classic Revival style house and outbuildings, museum
Weldon Spring Site Interpretive Center	St. Charles	St. Charles	Northeast	Multiple	website, history, natural history and environmental clean-up of the Weldon Spring Conservation Area
Weston Historical Museum	Weston	Platte	Northwest	Local history	website
Westphalia Historical Society Museum	Westphalia	Osage	Central	Local history	website
White House Hotel	Hermann	Gasconade	Northeast	Local history	Renovated and operating hotel with three suites and offers guide or self-guided tours. Website
Wilson's Creek National Battlefield	Republic	Greene	Southwest	Military	Includes American Civil War battlefield site and museum
Wonders of Wildlife Museum & Aquarium	Springfield	Greene	Southwest	Natural history	Currently closed for expansion, planned reopening in 2016 as America's Wildlife Museum & Aquarium
World's Largest Toy Museum	Branson	Taney	Southwest	Toy	website, over 1 million toys, includes Harold Bell Wright Museum
Wyeth-Tootle Mansion	Saint Joseph	Buchanan	Northwest	Historic house	website, Victorian mansion
Zewicki House Museum	Linn	Osage	Central	Historic house	website, operated by the Osage County Historical Society

== See also ==
- Nature Centers in Missouri

== Defunct museums ==
- '57 Heaven, Branson, formerly part of Dick Clark's American Bandstand Theater
- American Presidents Museum, Branson, collections now part of the National Center for Presidential Studies
- Augusta Station, Augusta, exhibit of model railroads
- Cementland, St. Louis, outdoor sculpture park, future uncertain since death of creator in 2011
- Civilian Conservation Corps Museum, St. Louis, closed in 2008
- Clarksville Museum, Clarksville
- Columbia Audubon Society Trailside Museum, Columbia
- Fire Museum of Missouri, Willow Springs
- First Due Museum, Hazelwood
- Fred Bear Museum, Springfield, now incorporated into the Archery Hall of Fame
- General Sweeny's Museum of Civil War History, Republic, closed in 2005
- International Bowling Museum, St. Louis, moved to Arlington, Texas in 2010
- Memoryville USA, Rolla, closed in 2009
- Missouri Photojournalism Hall of Fame, Washington, closed in 2014 and seeking new location, website
- National Video Game and Coin-Op Museum, St. Louis, closed in 1999
- Nance Museum, Lone Jack, collection of Saudi Arabian art and artifacts, donated to the University of Central Missouri, Warrensburg, Missouri in 2003
- Ozarks Afro-American Heritage Museum, Ash Grove, closed in 2013, collection now online
- Roy Rogers - Dale Evans Museum, Branson, website, moved from Victorville, California then closed in 2009
- Society of Memories Doll Museum, Saint Joseph, closed in 2011, collection now part of the St. Joseph Museums
- Walnut Springs Farm & Museum, Marshfield
- YouZeum, Columbia, closed 2010
