= List of National Historic Landmarks in Missouri =

Missouri National Historic Landmarks (clickable map)

The National Historic Landmarks (NHLs) in the U.S. state of Missouri represent Missouri's history from the Lewis and Clark Expedition, through the American Civil War, the Civil Rights Movement, and the Space Age. There are 36 National Historic Landmarks in Missouri. Two sites in Missouri were once a National Historic Landmark but later had their designations withdrawn when they failed to meet the program's criteria for inclusion. The NHLs are distributed across fifteen of Missouri's 114 counties and one independent city, with a concentration of fifteen landmarks in the state's only independent city, St. Louis.

The National Park Service (NPS), a branch of the U.S. Department of the Interior, administers the National Historic Landmark program. The NPS is responsible for determining which sites meet the criteria for designation or withdrawal as an NHL as well as identifying potential candidates for the program, through theme studies. The NPS and the National Park System Advisory Board then meet to determine the historical significance of these candidates. The final decision regarding a site's designation as a National Historic Landmark is made by the U.S. Secretary of the Interior. However, the owner of a property may object to the designation of that property as an NHL. In such cases, the site is only "eligible for designation." A property eligible for NHL status is also eligible for listing on the National Register of Historic Places (NRHP). Designated National Historic Landmarks are listed on the NRHP, which includes historic properties that the National Park Service has determined to be worthy of preservation. While NHL areas are deemed to carry national historic significance, other NRHP properties may only be significant at local or state levels.

Five historic sites in Missouri are in the U.S. National Park system. These are automatically listed in the NRHP and include one U.S. National Monument, one National Memorial, one National Battlefield, and two National Historic Sites.

== Key ==
	National Historic Landmark
^{†}	National Historic Landmark District
^{#}	National Historic Site, National Historical Park, National Memorial, or National Monument
^{*}	Delisted Landmark

== Current National Historic Landmarks ==
	Legend
(Note: Numbers represent an alphabetical ordering by significant words. Various colorings, defined here, differentiate National Historic Landmarks and historic districts from other NRHP buildings, structures, sites or objects.)	Site type
	National Historic Landmark
	National Historic Landmark District
	National Historic Site
	National Monument
	National Memorial
	National Battlefield

	Landmark name	Image	Date designated (Note: The eight- or nine-digit number below each date is the number assigned to each location in the National Register Information System database, which can be viewed by clicking the number.)	Location	County	Description
1^{†}	Anheuser-Busch Brewery	Anheuser-Busch Brewery	November 13, 1966 (#66000945)	St. Louis; 38°35′51″N 90°12′44″W	St. Louis (independent city)	The buildings in Anheuser-Busch's brewing district date from the late 1800s and are made of brick. Many are decorated with gargoyles and other such figures on the exterior. In addition, the company has also added new buildings and renovated older ones, but the district's status as a historic site has not been compromised.
2^{†}	Arrow Rock	Arrow Rock	May 23, 1963 (#66000422)	Arrow Rock; 39°04′01″N 92°56′42″W	Saline	The crossing of the Missouri River at Arrow Rock, which was recorded in the 1700s, played an important role in early explorations, such as the Lewis and Clark Expedition in 1804, that led to the opening of the American West. A ferry was later established near Arrow Rock, at what became a starting point for traders on the Santa Fe Trail. The district is now home to Arrow Rock State Park.
3	George Caleb Bingham House	George Caleb Bingham House	December 21, 1965 (#66000423)	Arrow Rock; 39°04′16″N 92°56′35″W	Saline	George Caleb Bingham, a painter, lived in this house from 1837 to 1845. During his time at this house, Bingham first sketched the Missouri River and local frontier life that later turned into his "genre" works.
4	Louis Bolduc House	Louis Bolduc House	April 15, 1970 (#69000305)	Ste. Genevieve; 37°59′20″N 90°03′14″W	Ste. Genevieve	This home was the residence of Louis Bolduc from around 1785 until his death in 1815. Bolduc was a lead miner, merchant, and planter, and was one of the local leaders of Ste. Genevieve, a small town. The house itself is an example of one in the French Colonial style of poteaux-sur-solle, or posts on sill, with a stone foundation. It also utilizes bouzillage (clay and grass) as a wall filling.
5	Carrington Osage Village Site	Carrington Osage Village Site	July 19, 1964 (#66000425)	Nevada; 37°58′52″N 94°12′35″W	Vernon	This site was occupied by the Big Osage tribe of Native Americans from around 1775–1825, and was the group's last area of residence in the southwestern portion of Missouri, as they were later confined to a Kansas reservation. The site is representative of the culture of the Big Osage, because it appears to have been a major trading area for the tribe. Now the Osage Village State Historic Site.
6	Christ Church Cathedral	Christ Church Cathedral	October 12, 1994 (#90000345)	St. Louis; 38°37′49″N 90°11′55″W	St. Louis (independent city)	Construction for the church began in 1859, but the structure was not completed until 1867. The Gothic Revival building was designed by architect Leopold Eidlitz, even though he was not devoted to the Gothic style.
7	"Champ" Clark House	"Champ" Clark House	December 8, 1976 (#76001114)	Bowling Green; 39°20′29″N 91°11′26″W	Pike	This house served as the residence of James Beauchamp Clark from 1899 until his death in 1921. Clark was the Speaker of the U.S. House of Representatives from 1911 to 1919.
8	Eads Bridge	Eads Bridge	January 29, 1964 (#66000946)	St. Louis; 38°38′N 90°10′W	St. Louis (independent city)	This steel bridge was built in 1874, at a total length of 6,442 feet (1,964 m). It was designed by Captain James B. Eads, who used a system of cantilevers to allow for the bridge's long length. At the time of its construction, the Eads Bridge was used primarily as a means to connect railroads running westward to Missouri and those running eastward to Illinois.
9	Joseph Erlanger House	Joseph Erlanger House	December 8, 1976 (#76002234)	St. Louis; 38°39′N 90°16′W	St. Louis (independent city)	This house was the home of Joseph Erlanger from 1917 until his death in 1965. Erlanger was an American physiologist and a co-recipient of the 1944 Nobel Prize in Physiology or Medicine. More recently, the house fell into a state of disrepair because its owner was unable to maintain the structure.
10	Field House	Field House	March 29, 2007 (#75002137)	St. Louis; 38°37′12″N 90°11′31″W	St. Louis (independent city)	This was the home of attorney Roswell Field, who represented slave Dred Scott in the U.S. Supreme Court case Scott v. Sandford (1857). Also the birthplace of Field's son, author Eugene Field, the house is currently known as the Eugene Field House and St. Louis Toy Museum.
11^{†}	Fort Osage	Fort Osage	November 5, 1961 (#66000418)	Sibley; 39°11′16″N 94°11′33″W	Jackson	This factory trading post was established by William Clark in 1808. Built for the protection of the Osage Indians, Fort Osage experienced success in as a trade house until the end of the factory system in 1822.
12	Gateway Arch	Gateway Arch	May 28, 1987 (#87001423)	St. Louis; 38°37′31″N 90°11′00″W	St. Louis (independent city)	The tallest man-made monument in the U.S., the arch is based on a weighted catenary design conceived by Finnish American architect Eero Saarinen. In 1967, the 630 feet (190 m) structure was opened to the public as part of the Jefferson National Expansion Memorial, which was renamed as Gateway Arch National Park in 2018.
13	Graham Cave	Graham Cave	January 20, 1961 (#66000420)	Mineola; 38°54′20″N 91°34′32″W	Montgomery	In 1949, remnants of Archaic American civilization were found in this cave. Dating back to 8,000 B.C., these remains indicate a blending of Eastern and Plains cultures at Graham Cave, which is now part of Graham Cave State Park.
14	Scott Joplin Residence	Scott Joplin Residence	December 8, 1976 (#76002235)	St. Louis; 38°38′14″N 90°12′54″W	St. Louis (independent city)	
15	Liberty Memorial	Liberty Memorial	September 20, 2006 (#00001148)	Kansas City; 39°04′49″N 94°35′10″W	Jackson	This building of this memorial started with a group of about 40 citizens, a Memorial Association led by Robert A. Long, and a dedication to build a memorial to the fallen soldiers of WW I. With funding secured (a massive fund raising that brought in over 2.5 million dollars) and approval from the city council, construction began on November 1, 1921. The Groundbreaking ceremony was the first and last gathering a group of men that included: Lieutenant General Jules Jacques de Dixmude of Belgium, Marshal Ferdinand Foch of France, General Armando Diaz of Italy, Admiral Earl Beatty of Great Britain, and General John J. Pershing of the United States. The dedication, on November 11, 1926, was attended by U.S. President Calvin Coolidge. The Liberty Memorial is home to The National World War I Museum
16^{†}	Missouri Botanical Garden	Missouri Botanical Garden	December 8, 1976 (#71001065)	St. Louis; 38°36′51″N 90°15′32″W	St. Louis (independent city)	
17	Mutual Musicians Association Building	Mutual Musicians Association Building	December 21, 1981 (#79001372)	Kansas City; 39°05′25″N 94°33′43″W	Jackson	Center of "Kansas City Style" of jazz
18	Patee House	Patee House	November 5, 1961 (#66000414)	St. Joseph; 39°46′N 94°51′W	Buchanan	
19	General John J. Pershing Boyhood Home	General John J. Pershing Boyhood Home	May 11, 1976 (#69000111)	Laclede; 39°47′N 93°10′W	Linn	A boyhood home of General John J. Pershing, now a state historic site
20	Research Cave		July 19, 1964 (#66000415)	Portland	Callaway	
21^{†}	Ste. Genevieve Historic District	Ste. Genevieve Historic District	October 9, 1960 (#66000892)	Ste. Genevieve; 37°58′37″N 90°02′55″W	Ste. Genevieve	The nation's highest concentration of French colonial log architecture
22	Sanborn Field and Soil Erosion Plots	Sanborn Field and Soil Erosion Plots	July 19, 1964 (#66000413)	Columbia; 38°56′33″N 92°19′14″W	Boone	Located on the University of Missouri campus the research conducted here helped establish soil conservation policy in the United States. The organism Streptomyces aureofaciens the original source of the drug Chlortetracycline (Aeruomycin), the first tetracycline antibiotic, was isolated here.
23	Shelley House	Shelley House	December 14, 1990 (#88000437)	St. Louis; 38°40′N 90°14′W	St. Louis (independent city)	House involved in a civil rights suit declaring racial covenants in property ownership deeds unconstitutional
24^{†}	Tower Grove Park	Tower Grove Park	December 20, 1989 (#72001556)	St. Louis; 38°36′22″N 90°15′22″W	St. Louis (independent city)	
25^{†}	Harry S Truman Farm Home	Harry S Truman Farm Home	February 4, 1985 (#78001650)	Grandview; 38°54′08″N 94°31′51″W	Jackson	
26^{†}	Harry S Truman Historic District	Harry S Truman Historic District	November 11, 1971 (#71001066)	Independence; 39°05′47″N 94°25′22″W	Jackson	
27	Mark Twain Boyhood Home	Mark Twain Boyhood Home	December 29, 1962 (#66000419)	Hannibal; 39°43′N 91°22′W	Marion	A boyhood home of Mark Twain
28	Union Station	Union Station	December 30, 1970 (#70000888)	St. Louis; 38°37′41″N 90°12′28″W	St. Louis (independent city)	
29	United States Customhouse And Post Office	United States Customhouse And Post Office	December 30, 1970 (#68000053)	St. Louis; 38°38′N 90°11′W	St. Louis (independent city)	Now known as the Old Post Office
30	Utz Site		July 19, 1964 (#66000424)	Marshall; 39°16′28″N 93°15′00″W	Saline	Major Native American village site; partly in Van Meter State Park
31	Wainwright Building	Wainwright Building	May 23, 1968 (#68000054)	St. Louis; 38°37′N 90°11′W	St. Louis (independent city)	
32^{†}	Washington University Hilltop Campus Historic District	Washington University Hilltop Campus Historic District	February 27, 1987 (#79003636)	St. Louis; 38°38′54″N 90°18′35″W	St. Louis (independent city)	Much of the Danforth Campus, part of the 1904 World's Fair grounds
33^{†}	Watkins Mill	Watkins Mill	November 13, 1966 (#66000416)	Excelsior; 39°24′04″N 94°15′37″W	Clay	
34	Westminster College Gymnasium	Westminster College Gymnasium	May 2, 1968 (#68000030)	Fulton; 38°50′54″N 91°57′22″W	Callaway	
35^{#}	White Haven	White Haven	June 23, 1986 (#79003205)	Grantwood Village; 38°33′04″N 90°21′07″W	St. Louis County	A home of Ulysses S. Grant, now a National Historic Site
36	Laura Ingalls Wilder House	Laura Ingalls Wilder House	July 17, 1991 (#70000353)	Mansfield; 37°06′N 92°34′W	Wright	

== Historic National Park Service areas ==
National Historical Parks, some National Historic Sites, some National Monuments, and certain other areas in the National Park system are highly protected historic landmarks of national importance, often listed before the inauguration of the NHL program in 1960 and not later named NHLs. There are five of these areas in Missouri. However, these five are listed by the National Park Service together with the other NHLs in Missouri.

	Landmark name	Image	Date listed	Locality	County	Description
1	George Washington Carver National Monument	Wooden cart with orange wheels in a field, in front of a white house	1943	Diamond; 36°59′10″N 94°21′14″W	Newton	
2	Ulysses S. Grant National Historic Site	light green and white building, large tree in foreground	1989	Grantwood Village; 38°33′04″N 90°21′07″W	St. Louis	
3	Gateway Arch National Park	huge arching parabolic structure, reflected in the water, at dusk	1966	St. Louis	St. Louis (independent city)	NRHP 66000941
4	Harry S. Truman National Historic Site	wooden white house, slatted with horizontal planks, trees in the background	1985	Independence; 39°05′N 94°25′W	Jackson	NRHP 85001248
5	Wilson's Creek National Battlefield	two cannons with wooden wheels and metal barrels, in a field	1960	Republic; 37°06′56″N 93°25′12″W	Greene	

== Former National Historic Landmarks ==
If an area currently designated as a National Historic Landmark is no longer eligible under the criteria for inclusion, its designation may be withdrawn. This usually occurs when the property undergoes any change that reduces or eliminates its national significance, usually demolition, addition, or other alterations. NHL status can be considered for withdrawal at the request of a property's owner or by the Secretary of the Interior. However, a former NHL can still remain on the National Register of Historic Places if it meets the necessary criteria for that listing. As of January 2009, only 28 sites are former (delisted) NHLs.

	Landmark name	Image	Date designated	Date withdrawn	Locality	County	Description
1	Goldenrod (showboat)	A faded blue, pink, and gold sign sits on the side of a rusting showboat and displays the words, "GOLDENROD / NATIONAL LANDMARK / SHOWBOAT / St. Charles, Missouri"	December 24, 1967	December 11, 2023	Kampsville, Illinois (Note: The Goldenrod Showboat traveled throughout the Midwestern United States from its construction in 1909 until 1937, at which time it was moved to the city of St. Louis, Missouri and anchored to the bottom of the Mississippi River. It stayed in St. Louis from 1937 to 1990, when it was purchased by the city of St. Charles, Missouri. In 2003, the city gave the showboat to a local businessperson, who moored it in Calhoun County, Illinois; in 2008, he transferred ownership of the boat to a St. Louis entrepreneur, who has stored it at another dock in the same county since then. While this means the Goldenrod Showboat is not currently a National Historic Landmark in Missouri, the National Park Service continues to list the ship as a Missouri landmark.); 39°18′00″N 90°36′32″W	St. Louis (independent city)	NRHP 67000029; ship was damaged by flooding and the remains were burned and scrapped.
2	USS Inaugural (minesweeper)	A monochrome ship, with striking paintwork in block patterns	1986	August 7, 2001	St. Louis; 38°37′N 90°11′W	St. Louis (independent city)	NRHP 86000091; the ship was torn from its mooring and grounded in 1993 and was a total loss.

== See also ==
- List of National Natural Landmarks in Missouri

== See also ==
- National Register of Historic Places listings in Missouri
- List of U.S. National Historic Landmarks by state
- List of areas in the United States National Park System
- List of National Natural Landmarks in Missouri
