= The Magic House =

The Magic House may refer to:

- The Magic House (film), a 1939 Czech film
- The Magic House (TV series), a 1994–1996 British children's television puppet show that aired on Scottish Television
- The Magic House, St. Louis Children's Museum, children's museum in Missouri
- The Magic House is a magical event in the television series Teletubbies about a puppet who walks around his pink house and sings from one of his windows.
