= Arrow Rock Lyceum Theatre =

American theater production company

Arrow Rock Lyceum Theater
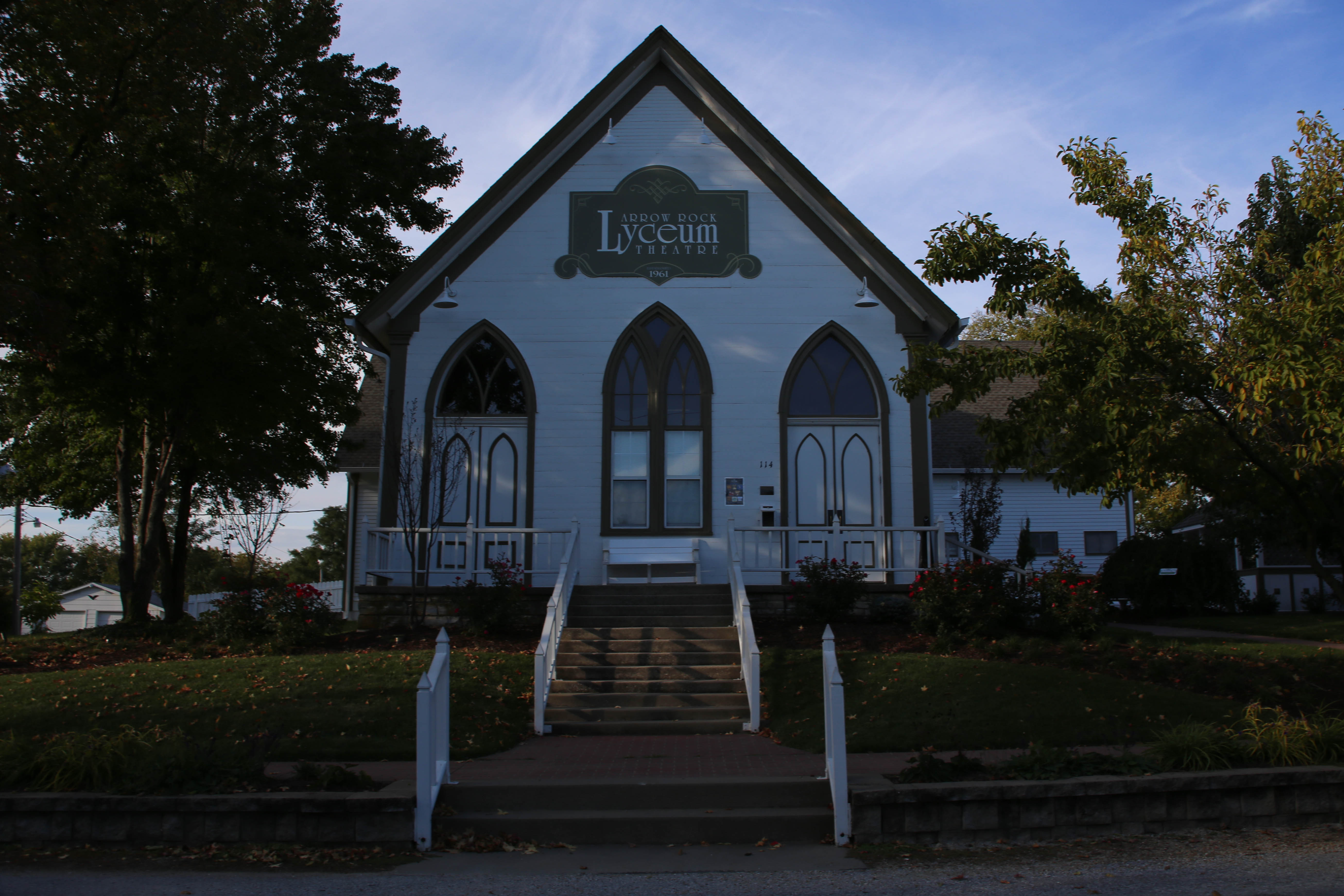
- The Arrow Rock Lyceum Theatre in 2013
- Formation: 1961
- Type: Theatre group
- Location: 114 High Street, Arrow Rock, Missouri 65320
- Artistic director: Robyne Parrish
- Website: lyceumtheatre.org

The Arrow Rock Lyceum Theatre, or simply the Lyceum Theatre, is a regional Equity theater in Arrow Rock, Missouri. Opening in 1961, the theatre is located in an historic church building within the Arrow Rock Historic District, a National Historic Landmark District since 1963. The 416-seat auditorium hosts over 33,000 patrons a year, and is Missouri's oldest professional regional theater.

== History ==
The Arrow Rock Lyceum Theatre was founded in 1961, and for its first season, performed three nineteenth-century plays on a budget of $3,500. The venue was originally a "1872 Gothic Revival Style" Baptist Church, whose congregation had consolidated with others in town and no longer used the building. Two families, the Lawrences and the Argubrights, co-owned the building and offered to let it be used as a theater. Henry Swanson, a professor at Columbia College was the first artistic director. In 1967, the theater attempted to raise $29,000 to purchase a new property. By its 30th anniversity in 1991, it had hosted 25,000 shows and had around 300,000 attendees. In 1993, the theatre underwent a renovation project to expand the capacity of the venue. In 2004, the theater's dormitory was damaged by a fire. The community provided housing for the cast for the following three seasons. From around 2005 to 2024, its artistic director was Quin Gresham, before his resignation. As of 2017, around 12,000 actors audition for roles at the theater per year. In 2019, the theatre was the first in the state to receive the "Missouri Historical Theatre" designation. In 2022, the Count Basie Orchestra performed at the theater. In 2024, it was renovated to have new seating placed.
