= Association of Children's Museums =

U.S. nonprofit organization

Association of Children's Museum
- Abbreviation: ACM
- Formation: 1962
- Type: Trade association for children's museums
- Legal status: 501(c)(3)
- Headquarters: 2550 South Clark Street, Suite 600; Arlington, Virginia 22202
- Coordinates: 38.851359°N 77.051934°W
- Origins: American Alliance of Museums
- Members: 470 institutions
- President & CEO: Arthur Affleck
- Board of directors: Putter Bert, President
- Publication: Hand to Hand
- Revenue: $3.5 million (2025)
- Award: Great Friend to Kids Award
- Website: childrensmuseums.org
- Formerly called: American Association of Youth Museums

The Association of Children's Museums (ACM) is a Arlington, Virginia–based organization that represents more than 400 children's museums in 23 countries throughout the world. The association began in 1962 as the American Association of Youth Museums and grew out of the desire for children's museums to meet as a separate group during the American Alliance of Museums' annual meeting. They remained an informal group, but their growth paralleled the growth of children's museums worldwide. In addition to organizing museums and administration of grants to museums, the Association partners with other organizations, including the Eunice Kennedy Shriver National Institute of Child Health and Human Development on health issues related to children.

== Great Friend to Kids Award ==
The Association of Children's Museums initiated the Great Friend to Kids Award in 1991 to honor individuals who have made outstanding contributions toward strengthening education for children. National Great Friend to Kids Award winners include Fred Rogers ("Mister Rogers") and Marian Wright Edelman (president and founder of the Children's Defense Fund).

== Membership ==
Select Association members:

- Boonshoft Museum of Discovery
- Boston Children's Museum
- Chicago Children's Museum
- Discovery Place
- The Magic House, St. Louis
- TELUS Spark

== See also ==
- List of children's museums in the United States (alphabetical)
