= William B. Sappington House =

Historic house in Missouri, United States

- U.S. National Register of Historic Places
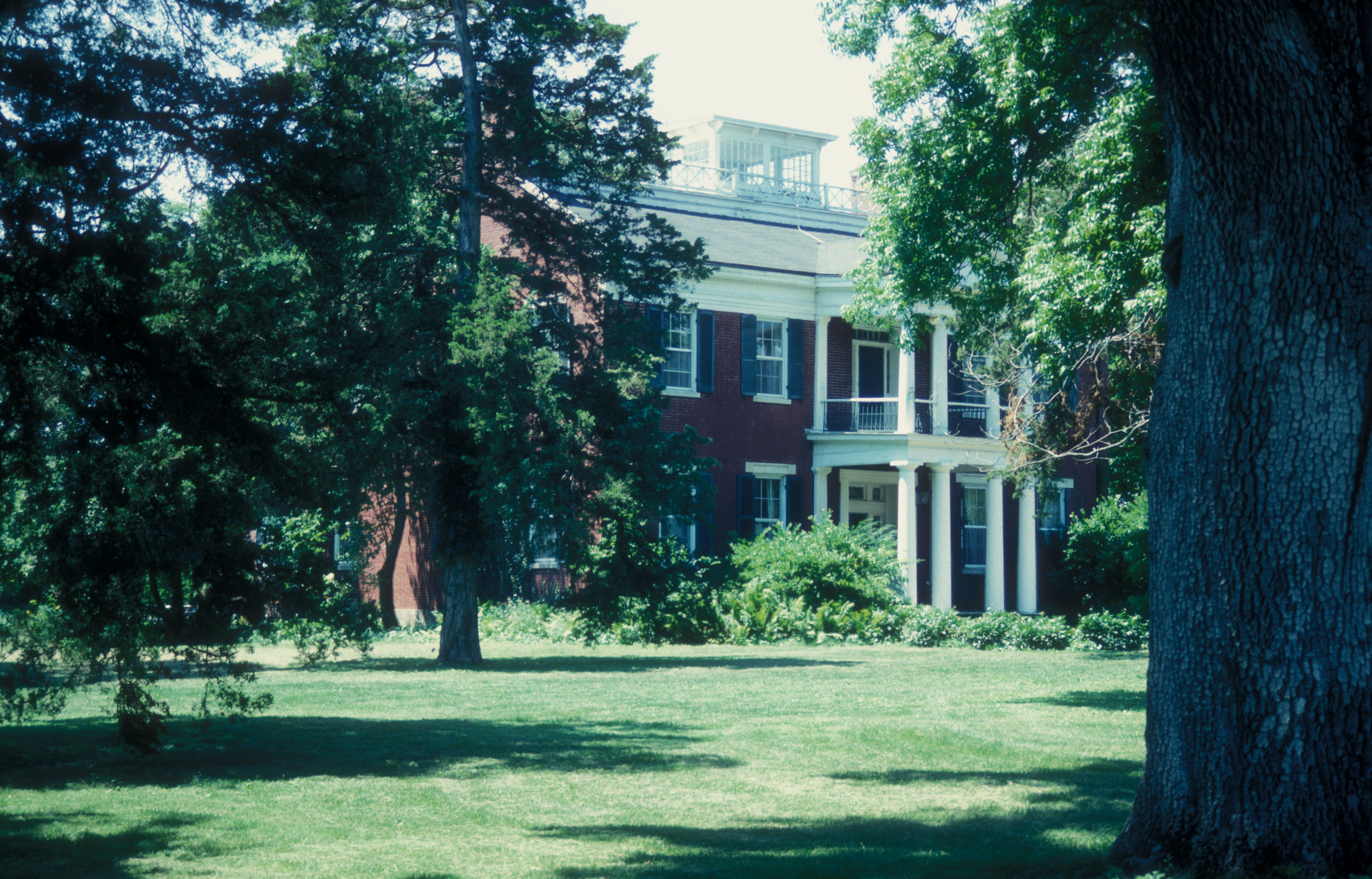
- William B. Sappington House, January 2007

- Location within Missouri Location within the United States
- Location: 3 miles (4.8 km) southwest of Arrow Rock on CR TT, near Arrow Rock, Missouri
- Coordinates: 39°2′24″N 92°59′9″W
- Area: 2 acres (0.81 ha)
- Built: 1843
- Architectural style: Greek Revival
- NRHP reference No.: 70000348
- Added to NRHP: January 21, 1970

William B. Sappington House, also known as Prairie Park, is a historic home located near Arrow Rock, Saline County, Missouri. It was built in 1843, and is a 2 1/2-story, square, Greek Revival style brick dwelling on a limestone foundation. It measures 60 feet wide. The front facade features a two-story front portico with Doric order and Ionic order columns. Its roof is topped by a roof deck and cupola. The house was extensively restored from 1948 to 1955.

It was added to the National Register of Historic Places in 1970.
