= John Beauchamp Jones =

American novelist and editor (1810–1866)

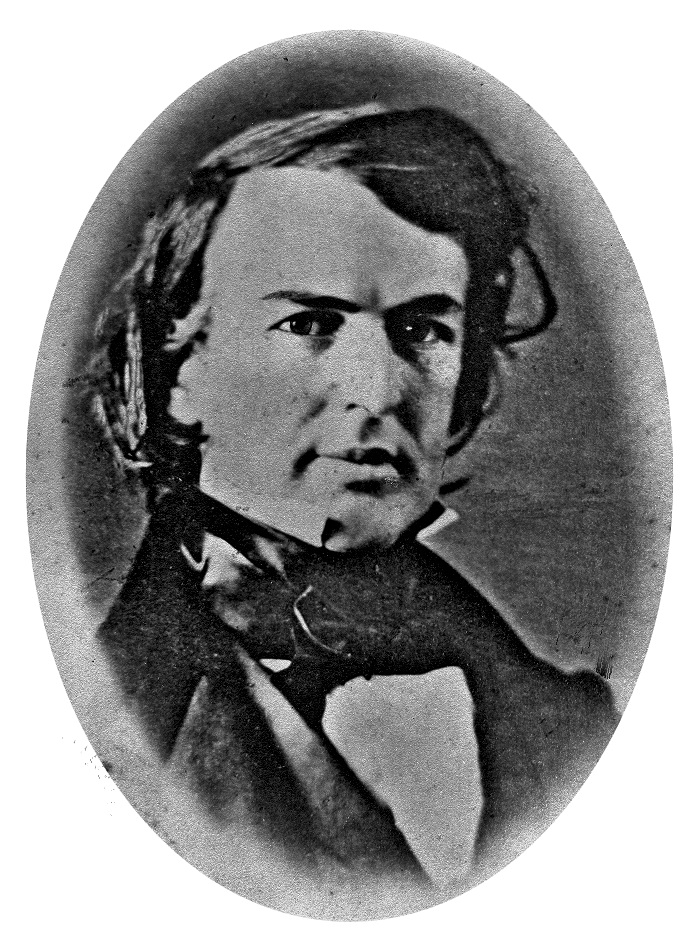
- A likeness of Jones when he was editor and majority owner of the Daily Madisonian during President John Tyler's administration
- Born: John Beauchamp Jones; March 6, 1810; Baltimore, Maryland
- Died: February 4, 1866 (aged 55); Burlington, New Jersey
- Occupations: Writer; editor; publisher; U.S. consul; C.S. government clerk
- Spouse: Frances T. Custis
- Writing career
- Pen name: J. B. Jones
- Language: English

John Beauchamp Jones (March 6, 1810 – February 4, 1866) was a novelist (particularly of the American West and the American South) whose books enjoyed popularity during the mid-19th century and a well-connected literary editor and political journalist in the two decades leading up to the American Civil War. During the war, he served as a senior clerk in the Confederate War Department and is today remembered for his diary, published as A Rebel War Clerk's Diary at the Confederate States Capital.

== Antebellum life ==
=== Maryland, Kentucky and Missouri ===
Jones was born in Baltimore, Maryland, to Joshua Jones, Jr., one of the defenders of Baltimore during the War of 1812, and Mary Ann Sands. Financial losses overtook the family and prompted a move to Cynthiana, Harrison County, Kentucky in about 1815. Jones traveled to Missouri in 1830 to assist his brother, Joseph, who was opening for his employer—an established merchant in New Franklin—a branch store at Arrow Rock in Missouri's Boonslick region. John Beauchamp Jones participated as a clerk in the enterprise from 1830 until about 1836, with his experience in the role the basis for his novel The Western Merchant, written under the pseudonym Luke Shortfield. Jones's later minor notoriety along with his recital of the details and particulars in The Western Merchant of the store opening may have led to his being solely credited by some sources with establishing the first store in Arrow Rock.

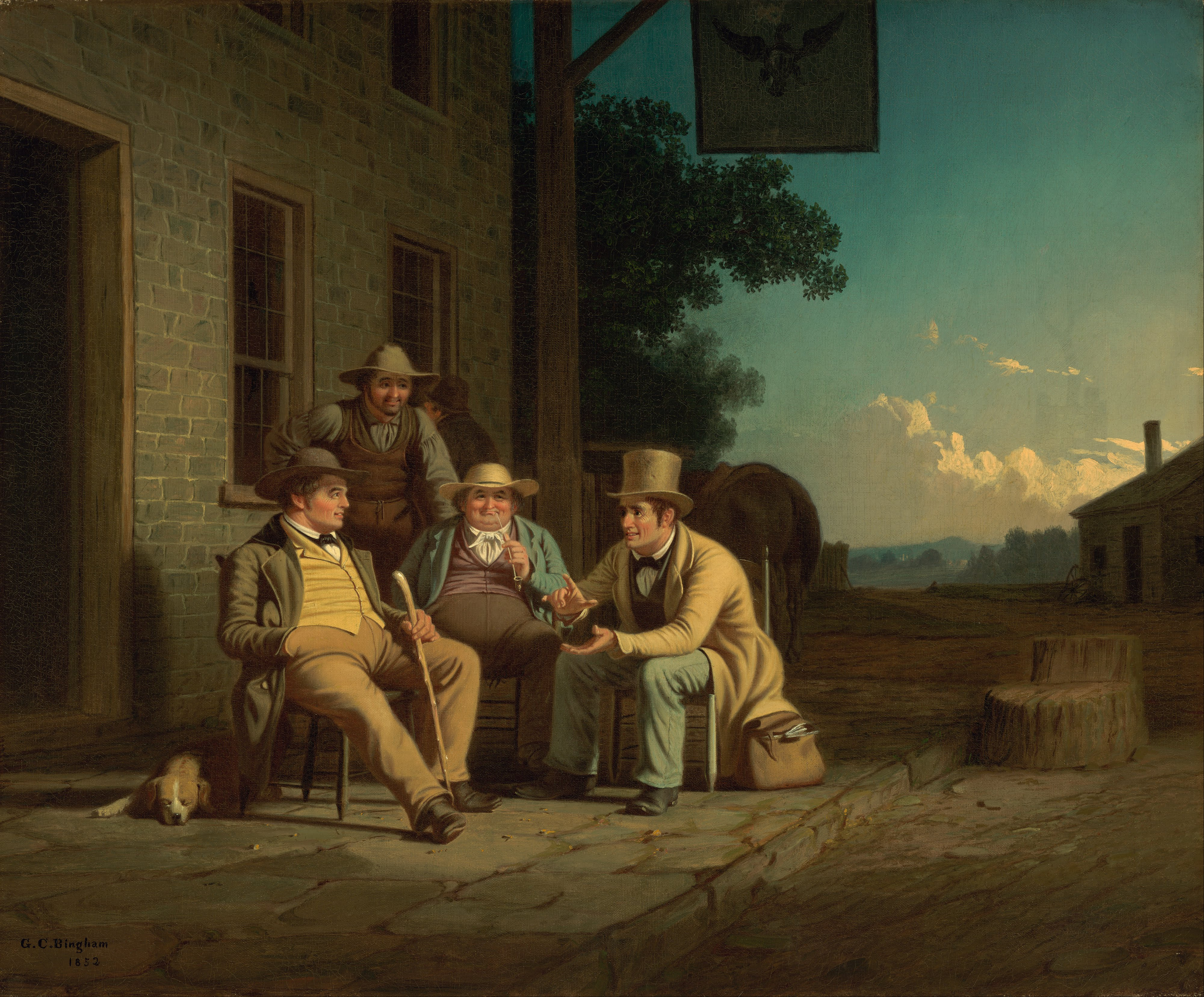
"Canvassing for a Vote", an 1852 painting by George Caleb Bingham

In Arrow Rock, John B. Jones became friends with genre painter of the frontier and Missouri Whig politician George Caleb Bingham. Bingham is featured in Jones's novel, The Life and Adventures of a Country Merchant (1854). Bingham may have reciprocated. According to Robin Grey, in Bingham's famous election "genre" studies, Jones is the seated figure on the left in the painting Canvassing for a Vote (1851—52).

=== Pennsylvania, Maryland, and Washington, D. C. ===
Jones left Arrow Rock sometime in the mid-1830s, returning east, where he wrote fiction and various newspaper articles. In 1835, a book of his poetry, Seven Ages, Memory, and Other Poems, was published in Cincinnati, Ohio.

During the late 1830s and 1840, Jones was a nearly penniless writer, residing in turns in Baltimore and Philadelphia.

Jones was in Baltimore, Maryland, at least by the middle of 1839, when he exchanged correspondence with Edgar Allan Poe, about the time Poe became the assistant editor of Burton's Gentleman's Magazine and American Monthly Review in Philadelphia. On August 6, Jones wrote Poe, informing him that he had been criticized by The Sun and other newspapers in the city. Poe replied on August 8. In November, Burtin's published Jones's lengthy essay about the plight of American authors, Thoughts on the Literary Prospects of America in Burtons', which included Poe's and Jones's joint concern about the lack of copyright protection, "But the most powerful and withering cause which has operated against the chances of our country in the competition for literary honors, has been the piratical course pursued by our publishers, in reprinting the productions of foreign pens, because they could be procured without expense."

In December, his story, The Lump of Gold, was published in Burton's.

Jones married heiress Frances T. Custis of Drummondtown on the Eastern Shore of Virginia on April 14, 1840. (Note: Jones was 30 and Custis was 31 when they married. They later had four children: Custis Parsons (1841), Anne Sands (1843), Thomas Coble (1846), and Frances Edith (1850).) The couple had been introduced by Baltimore area socialite Sally Parson, Custis's aunt, a spinster. Through his wife's social and familial (Note: Frances was first cousin three times removed to Daniel Parke Custis, first husband of Martha Dandridge Custis Washington and half-first cousin once removed with Henry A. Wise.) connections, Jones became acquainted with influential men such as John Tyler and Henry A. Wise, then a member of United States House of Representatives representing Virginia. (Note: The finances of Frances's family were controlled by two uncles, her father, Major Thomas Custis, having died when Frances was a toddler. William H.B. Custis was security on the marriage license bond of John B. Jones and Frances T. Custis.) Jones mentions his wife's property on the Eastern Shore early in his diary. Jones's marriage into the politically connected Virginia slave-holding family influenced both his fiction and newspaper career.

In May 1840, he became joint proprietor—probably from the dowry of his new wife—and editor of the weekly Baltimore Saturday Visiter. Later that year, Jones launched a monthly literary magazine, in which he held a significant financial stake, called the Baltimore Phoenix & Budget. Having failed to interest publishers in his first three novels— Wild Western Scenes, The Western Merchant, and Freaks of Fortune—, Jones serialized them in Baltimore Saturday Visiter and Baltimore Phoenix & Budget. He sold his interests in both periodicals to Joseph Evan Snodgrass in the fall of 1841.

On April 4, 1841, President William Henry Harrison died after just 31 days in office, succeeded by Vice President John Tyler. One of Tyler's first presidential actions was to designate The Daily Madisonian, a Washington newspaper, as his administration's journalistic organ. (Note: Organ—a newspaper, magazine, or other means of communicating information, thoughts, or opinions, especially on behalf of some organization, political group, or the like. [dictionary. com]) Jones purchased the newspaper from Thomas Allen, where he became the editor as well as proprietor.

Jones was offered the post as chargé ď affaires at Naples during the Polk administration by Secretary of State John C. Calhoun. Jones declined the offer despite his respect for Calhoun.

In the 1840s and 1850s, Jones repeatedly connected government, business, and banking in his books, sometimes in mystery and seriousness and other times hilariously comedic. As early as the 1840s, Jones warned his readers to follow the money, to observe where it had come from, where it was going, and what it was used for.

In 1857, Jones founded and edited the pro-South Southern Monitor in Philadelphia, living across the Delaware River in Burlington, New Jersey. Anticipating the outbreak of the American Civil War, he abandoned the paper, left his family behind, and fled to Montgomery, Alabama, arriving in Richmond, Virginia on April 12, 1861, the day Fort Sumter was fired on. His fears were realized when the office of his Southern Monitor was visited and attacked by mobs seeking the newspaper's editor on April 15.

== Civil War ==
=== Family ===
The Civil War as a fratricidal war—with brothers and relatives on opposing sides—was clearly demonstrated by the case of John Beauchamp Jones and his five brothers. John was ultra-southern. Richard and Robert were both Union men. Robert had been shot by a secessionist and badly wounded. William was a rebel, arrested and taken to Jefferson City, Missouri, where he was released without trial after being detained for a few days. Ben left Missouri, returning to Kentucky. Caleb, a wealthy former merchant and farmer in Missouri, while opposed to secession and believing there was no right to secede, thought the Southern grievances justified rebellion and revolution. Caleb's family and fortune suffered from demands made on them from both sides and, in 1864, took refuge in Canada, writing, "Our State is in a deplorable condition every crime is committed with impunity. Most of our friends have left." He thought that between the Jayhawkers and the bushwhackers, Missouri would be devastated and only a fit abode for the lawless for years to come.

=== Diary ===
With recommendations from influential southerners, including a memorial (Note: Memorial—a written statement of facts presented to a sovereign, a legislative body, etc., as the ground of, or expressed in the form of, a petition or remonstrance. (Dictionary.com)) from John Tyler and members of the Virginia secession convention to Jefferson Davis, Jones was able to secure employment as a high-ranking government clerk in the Confederate States War Department at the first Confederate capitol in Montgomery. When the Confederate government moved to Richmond, Virginia, his family joined him. From the first day of his flight from the North, Jones kept a diary to preserve the details of these eventful times for future publication.

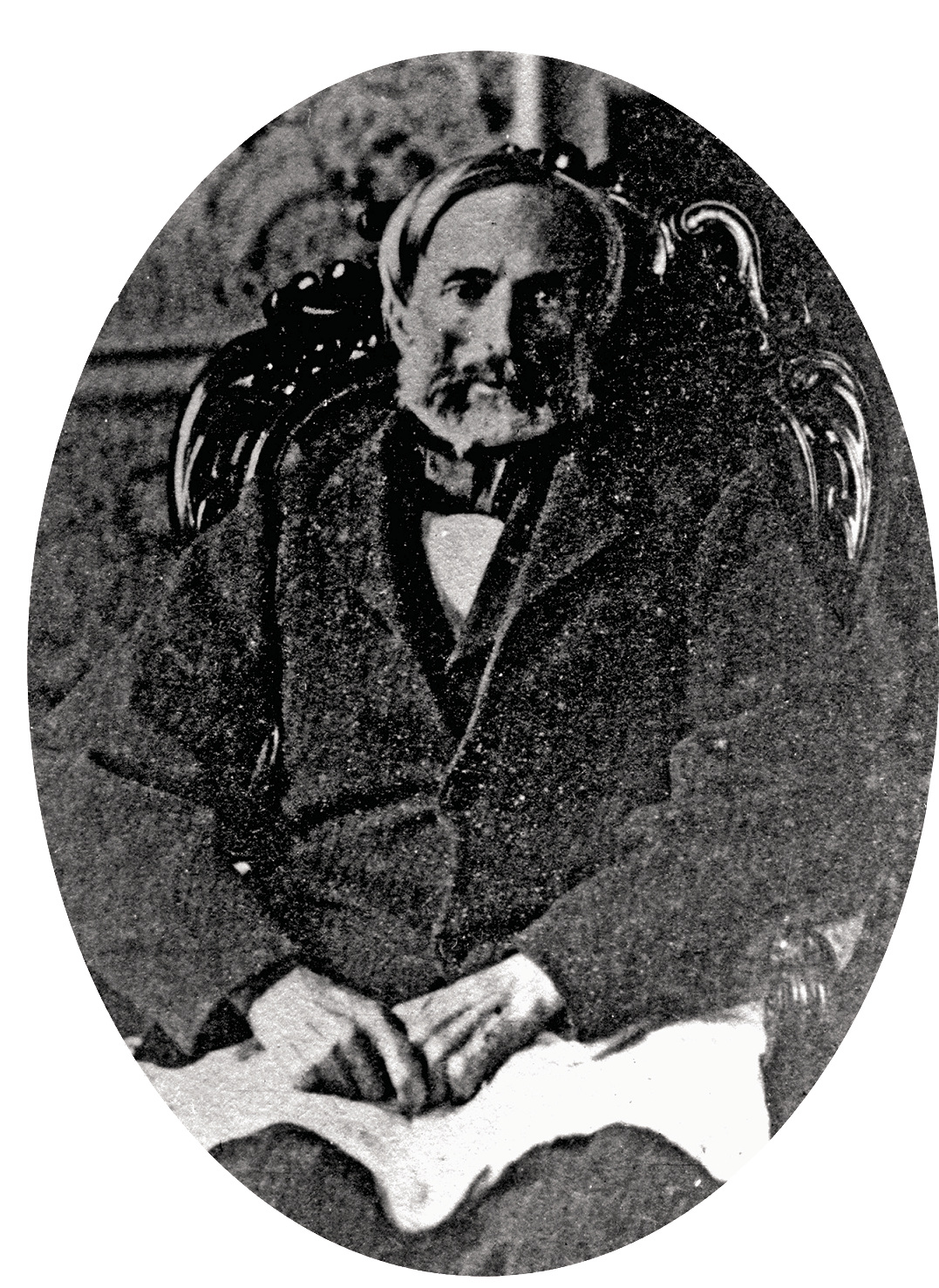
John Beauchamp Jones just before his death from tuberculosis in 1866.

After the war, Jones and his family returned to his home in Burlington, New Jersey, and prepared his manuscript for publication. In 1866, it was published as A Rebel War Clerk's Diary at the Confederate States Capital. Jones died of tuberculosis on February 4, 1866, never seeing his diary in print.

The published diary is one of the best sources of everyday life in Richmond during the war; also with details concerning the inner workings of the War Department. James I. Robertson, Jr. has called him "The Civil War's Most Valuable Diarist."

== Literary activities ==
Jones's fiction and activities as an editor attracted the attention of other literary notables of the period, including Edgar Allan Poe and William Gilmore Simms. Jones's early novels, Wild Western Scenes: A Narrative of Adventures in the Western Wilderness, Forty Years Ago (1841), The Western Merchant: A Narrative . . . (1849), and Life and Adventures of a Country Merchant: A Narrative of His Exploits at Home, during His Travels, and in the Cities; Designed to Amuse and Instruct (1854), capture the picturesque and generally Edenic qualities of the West, where he spent his early years. Jones's novels commend the honesty of "the People" and predict their abiding success, based on the democratic republicanism of Thomas Jefferson

Signature of John Beauchamp Jones from Edgar Allan Poe's "A Chapter on Autography", Graham's Magazine, December 1841

Edgar Allan Poe took note of Jones in 1841 in "A Chapter on Autography", published in Graham's Magazine in December 1841.

Mr. J. BEAUCHAMP JONES has been, we believe, connected for many years past with the lighter literature of Baltimore, and at present edits the “Baltimore Saturday Visiter,” with much judgment and general ability. He is the author of a series of papers of high merit now in course of publication in the “Visiter,” and entitled “Wild Western Scenes.”

In Wild Southern Scenes. A Tale of Disunion! and Border War!, Jones wrote of

a violent future in which Southerners would endure an era that would exceed the French Reign of Terror. Northern authorities erected a guillotine in every city and township. Tribunals of Three investigated and executed people suspected of sympathizing with slavery and the South. A Northern tyrant named Ruffleton assumed the title Lord Protector and planned an empire reminiscent of Rome. His Senate would consist of hereditary nobles drawn from the finest families. His subjects would identify themselves as Americans only; all state lines would be erased, all sectional affiliations would vanish within the new empire. The plan failed because Britain joined the war to finish off an old enemy. Stirred by the return of their revolutionary foes, American armies united and repelled Ruffleton's invaders. ...[At the] end of the book...the Union had been restored and sectionalism dissolved.

== In popular culture ==
Jones appears as a humorous supporting character in Harry Turtledove's The Guns of the South, a science fiction novel set in the 1860s.

== Works ==
Novels

- Wild Western Scenes, Grigg, Elliot and Co., 1849 [Luke Shortfield, pseud.].
- The Western Merchant: A Narrative. Containing Useful Instruction for the Western Man of Business, Grigg, Elliot & Co., [Luke Shortfield, pseud.] 1849.
- The City Merchant: or, The Mysterious Failure, Lippincott, Grambo & Co., 1851.
- The Rival Belles; or, Life in Washington, T. B. Peterson & Brothers, 1878 [1st Pub. 1852].
- Adventures of Col. Gracchus Vanderbomb, of Sloughcreek, in Pursuit of the Presidency: Also the Exploits of Mr. Numberius Plutarch Kipps, his Private Secretary, A. Hart, 1852.
- Freaks of Fortune; or, The History and Adventures of Ned Lorn, T. B. Peterson, 1854.
- The Monarchist: An Historical Novel Embracing Real Characters and Romantic Adventures, A. Hart, 1853.
- The Winkles; or, The Merry Monomaniacs. An American Picture with Portraits of the Natives, 1855.
- Wild Western Scenes-Second Series. The Warpath: A Narrative of Adventures in the Wilderness, J. B. Lippincott, 1856.
- Life and Adventures of a Country Merchant : A Narrative of his Exploits at Home, During his Travels, and in the Cities, Designed to Amuse and Instruct, J. B. Lippincott, 1857.
- Wild Southern Scenes. A Tale of Disunion! and Border War!, T. B. Peterson & Brothers, 1859.
- Secession, Coercion, and Civil War. The Story of 1861, T. B. Peterson & Brothers, 1861.
- Wild Western Scenes; or, The White Spirit of the Wilderness. Being a Narrative of Adventures, Embracing the Same Characters Portrayed in the Original "Wild Western Scenes." New Series, 1863.
- Love and Money, T.B. Peterson, 1865.
- Life and Adventures of a Country Merchant: A Narrative of his Exploits at Home, During his Travels, and in the Cities, J. B. Lippincott, 1875.

Diary

- A Rebel War Clerk's Diary at the Confederate States Capital, Volume 1, Volume 2, Philadelphia: J. B. Lippincott & Co., 1866.
