= Kennett City Hall and Masonic Lodge =

- U.S. National Register of Historic Places
- Location within Missouri Location within the United States
- Location: 122 College St., Kennett, Missouri
- Coordinates: 36°14′11″N 90°4′8″W
- Area: 0.2 acres (0.081 ha)
- Built: 1903
- NRHP reference No.: 81000333
- Added to NRHP: September 17, 1981

The Kennett City Hall and Masonic Lodge, is a historic building located at Kennett, Dunklin County, Missouri, USA. It has also been known as the Dunklin County Museum. As originally constructed in 1903, the first floor was used exclusively as Kennett's City Hall and the second floor was occupied by several local Masonic organizations. The Masons moved to a new building in the 1950s, and in 1976 the city vacated the premises as well.

In 2013, the building was housing the Dunklin County Museum, an historical museum for the county.

It is 85 by 25 feet (25.9 m × 7.6 m) in plan.

It was listed on the National Register of Historic Places in 1981.
