= J. Huston Tavern =

- Arrow Rock Tavern
- U.S. National Register of Historic Places
- U.S. Historic district – Contributing property
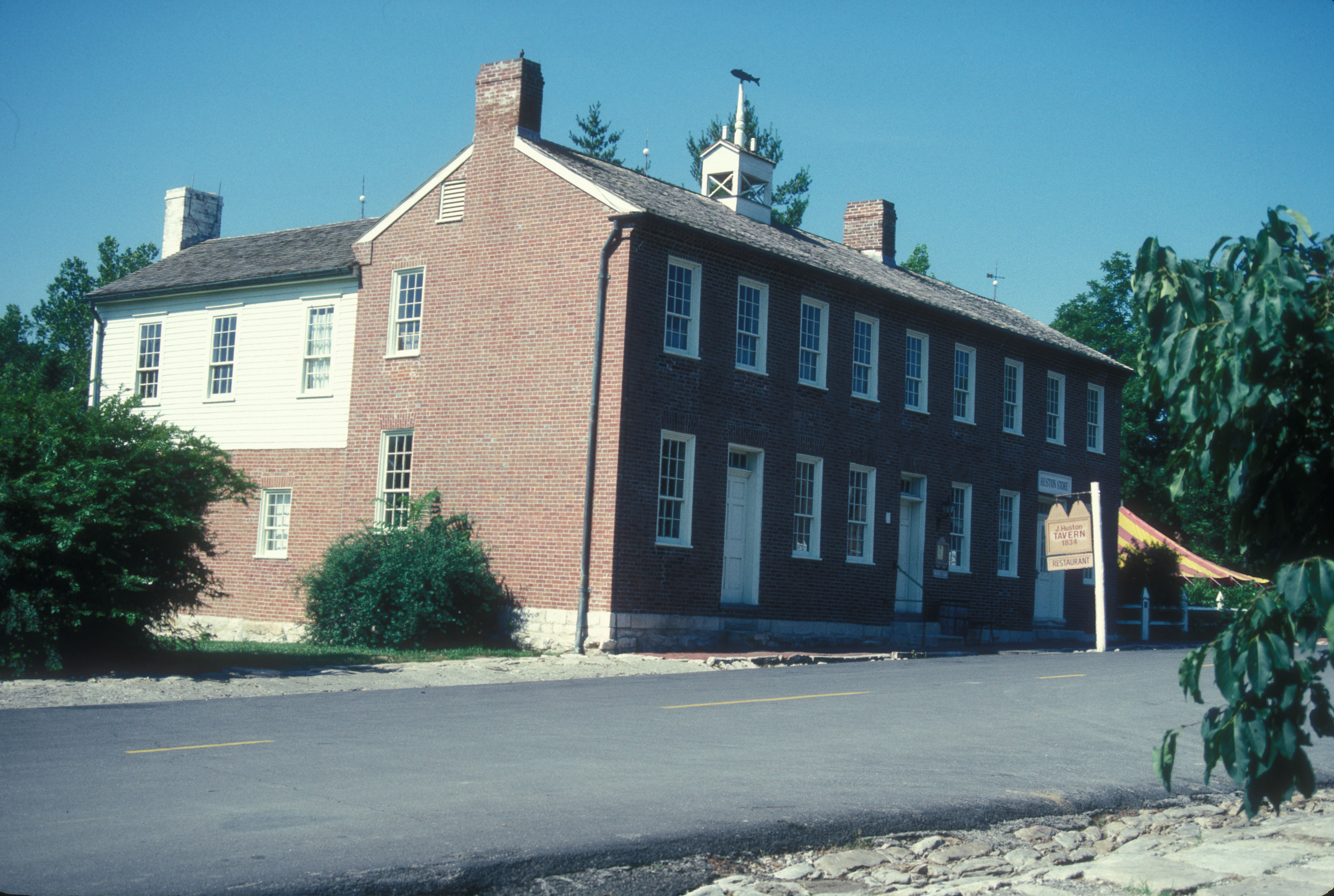
- Arrow Rock Tavern, January 2007

- Location within Missouri Location within the United States
- Location: Main St., Arrow Rock, Missouri
- Coordinates: 39°4′3″N 92°56′42″W
- Area: less than one acre
- Built: 1834
- Built by: Huston, Joseph
- Architectural style: Federal
- NRHP reference No.: 72000729
- Added to NRHP: February 23, 1972

J. Huston Tavern, also known as the Arrow Rock Tavern and The Old Tavern, is a historic tavern building located at Arrow Rock, Saline County, Missouri. It was built in 1834 by Judge Joseph Huston, and is a 2 1/2-story, Federal style brick building. A store with a second-floor ballroom was added in 1840. The tavern is the oldest continuously serving restaurant in Missouri, as well as west of the Mississippi River.

It was added to the National Register of Historic Places in 1972. It is located in the Arrow Rock Historic District.
