= George Caleb Bingham House =

Historic house in Missouri, United States

- U.S. National Register of Historic Places
- U.S. National Historic Landmark
- U.S. National Historic Landmark District – Contributing property
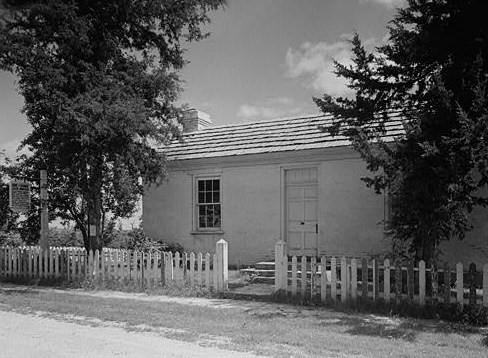
- George Caleb Bingham House in 1942

- Location within Missouri Location within the United States
- Location: Arrow Rock, Missouri
- Coordinates: 39°4′15″N 92°56′35″W
- Area: less than one acre
- Built: 1837; 189 years ago
- Architect: George Caleb Bingham
- Architectural style: Federal
- Part of: Arrow Rock Historic District (ID66000422)
- NRHP reference No.: 66000423

Significant dates
- Added to NRHP: 15 October 1966
- Designated NHL: December 21, 1965
- Designated NHLDCP: 23 May 1963

The George Caleb Bingham House is a historic house, part of Arrow Rock State Historic Site in Arrow Rock, Missouri, United States. Built in 1837, it was the principal residence of portraitist and landscape painter George Caleb Bingham (1811–79) from 1837 to 1845. It was declared a National Historic Landmark in 1965.

== Overview ==
The George Caleb Bingham House is located in the rectangular grid of streets that make up the village of Arrow Rock, near its eastern end at the southeast junction of 1st and High Streets. This property is included in, and forms part of the northern boundary of, the Arrow Rock State Historic Site. The house is a small single-story brick structure, with a three-bay front facade, side gable roof, and chimneys built into the end walls. Its main block has two rooms, and there is a wood-frame addition to the rear.

The house was built in 1837 by George Caleb Bingham, then just married and starting his career. He lived intermittently in this house until 1845, and it is where he developed his signature style of portrait and landscape painting that featured the landscapes and people of the Missouri frontier.

The house underwent a number of significant changes after Bingham moved out. By 1870 it had reportedly been enlarged, and a second story added. In 1926 it was purchased by a preservationist, and it was acquired by the state in 1934. It was then subjected to a restoration that removed all additions and reduced it to its brick core. It was given a more thoughtful restoration in 1964–65, with the goal of returning it to a Federal style appearance, due to a lack of documentary evidence of its condition during Bingham's residency.

== See also ==
- List of National Historic Landmarks in Missouri
- National Register of Historic Places listings in Saline County, Missouri
