= Arrow Rock State Historic Site =

Open-air museum in Missouri, U.S.

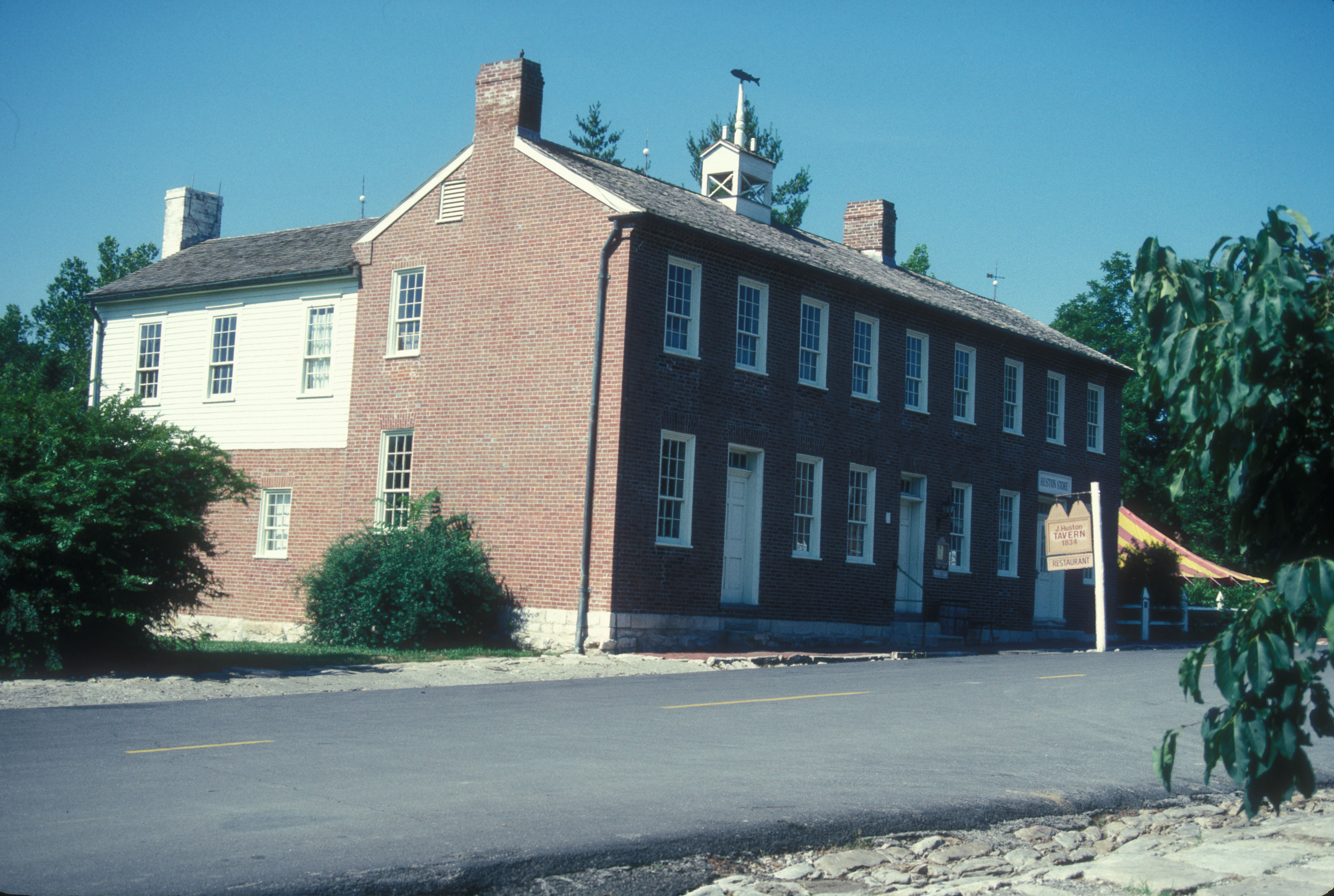
- Arrow Rock Tavern

- Location within Missouri Location within the United States
- Location: Arrow Rock, Missouri, United States
- Coordinates: 39°04′11″N 92°56′47″W
- Area: 167.39 acres (67.74 ha)
- Elevation: 712 ft (217 m)
- Established: 1923
- Visitors: 80,561 (in 2023)
- Administrator: Missouri Department of Natural Resources
- Website: Official website
- Arrow Rock State Historic Site Bridge
- U.S. National Register of Historic Places
- Nearest city: Arrow Rock, Missouri
- Area: less than one acre
- Built: 1937
- Built by: WPA
- Architect: NPS
- MPS: ECW Architecture in Missouri State Parks 1933-1942 TR
- NRHP reference No.: 85000516
- Added to NRHP: March 4, 1985

Arrow Rock State Historic Site is an open-air museum encompassing bluffs along the Missouri River and a portion of the village of Arrow Rock, Missouri. The park is part of the Arrow Rock Historic District, a National Historic Landmark, and commemorates the history of the area as a key stop on the Santa Fe Trail.

A visitor center museum features exhibits about Arrow Rock and the Boone's Lick country. The Bingham Home, built by artist George Caleb Bingham, is a historic house museum furnished as in the 1880s. The 1834 Huston Tavern is a restaurant. A walking tour of the site includes the old courthouse, town doctor's home, stone jail, and other historic buildings. The park's amenities also include camping facilities and hiking trails.

The bridge and shelters were listed on the National Register of Historic Places in 1985.

== Works Progress Administration works at Arrow Rock State Historic Site ==
Works Progress Administration works at Arrow Rock State Historic Site, near Arrow Rock, Missouri, are works built by Works Progress Administration workers during 1934 to 1937. These include:

- Arrow Rock State Historic Site Bridge, at Arrow Rock State Historic Site, southeast of Arrow Rock, Missouri (National Park Service and Works Progress Administration), NRHP-listed. It is a three arch span stone bridge.
- Arrow Rock State Historic Site Grave Shelter, Arrow Rock State Historic Site, southeast of Arrow Rock, Missouri (National Park Service and Works Progress Administration), NRHP-listed
- Arrow Rock State Historic Site Lookout Shelter, Arrow Rock State Historic Site, east of Arrow Rock, Missouri (National Park Service and Works Progress Administration), NRHP-listed
- Arrow Rock State Historic Site Open Shelter
