= Discovery Center of Springfield =

- Established: 1998
- Location: 438 St. Louis Street, Springfield, Missouri, United States
- Coordinates: 37.2087°N 93.2886°W
- Website: Discovery Center of Springfield

The Discovery Center of Springfield (DCS) in Springfield, Missouri, is an interactive, hands-on science center. In December 2021, inaugural grand prize winner of the Center for Education Reform and media partner Forbes STOP Award. The Wall Street Journal editorial board wrote about the museum that became a school winning the $1 million award.

At the onset of the COVID-19 pandemic in March 2020, the Discovery Center remained open, providing emergency, licensed childcare for the families of healthcare workers and first responders. DCS provided over 200,000 hours of free childcare and over 50,000 free meals and snacks.

Its history goes back to the late 1980s when a group of community volunteers led by the junior league of Springfield began a feasibility study for a children's hands-on museum project for Springfield and the Ozark region.

In 1991 Discovery Center of Springfield was incorporated. Over the next six years the volunteer board of directors and other committed community volunteers planned the building purchase and renovation, exhibits and program development and business operation. Since its opening in January 1998, the DCS has developed and added programs and exhibits. In 2000, they completed a master plan process and determined it was time to begin planning for expansion. In September 2006 DCS opened a new 30,000 sq. ft. building expansion with additional exhibits.
