= The Magic House, St. Louis Children's Museum =

Not-for-profit children's museum in Kirkwood, Missouri, USA

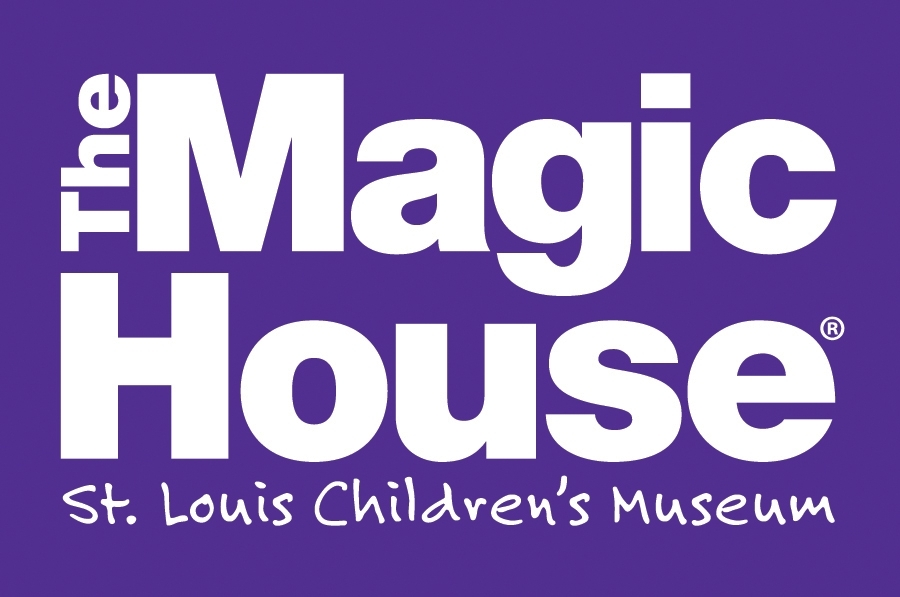
- Established: 1979
- Location: 516 S. Kirkwood Rd., Kirkwood, Missouri, 63122
- Coordinates: 38°34′26″N 90°24′21″W
- Visitors: 500,000 + annually
- President: Elizabeth Fitzgerald
- Public transit access: MetroBus
- Website: magichouse.org

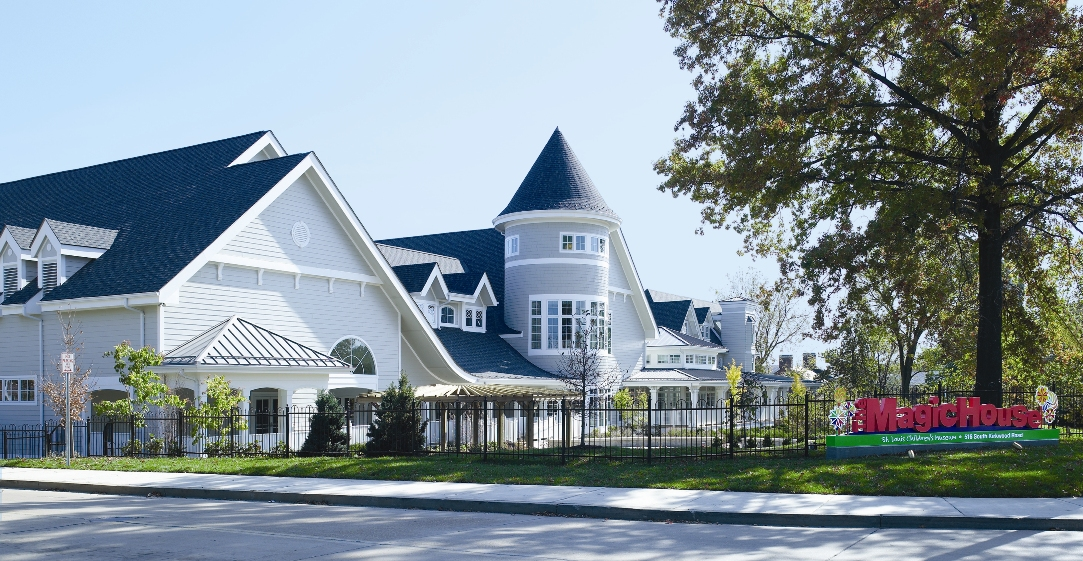
The Magic House from Kirkwood Road

The Magic House is a not-for-profit children's museum located in Kirkwood, Missouri, just outside St. Louis. The Magic House opened as a children's museum in 1979 with the mission of engaging children in hands-on learning experiences that encourage experimentation, creativity and the development of problem-solving skills within a place of beauty, wonder, joy and magic. Since the opening of the Museum in 1979, The Magic House has undergone a series of additions and renovations that have expanded the Museum space from 5,500 square feet to 55,000 square feet (5,100 m^{2}). The Magic House has gained recognition as one of the nation's top children's museums, and was ranked the nation's #1 attraction based on child appeal by Zagat U.S. Family Travel Guide. The Museum attracts more than 560,000 visitors per year and since its opening has been visited by more than 12 million people.

== History ==
In addition to serving as a major cultural attraction for the region, The Magic House holds a special place in the history of St. Louis. The original Victorian style house built in 1901 belonged to the George Lane Edwards Family. Edwards was a managing partner in his family's brokerage firm, A. G. Edwards & Sons, as well as the first president of the St. Louis Stock Exchange and a director of the Louisiana Purchase Exposition. The second and third floors of the original Museum currently house exhibits chronicling the lives of the Edwards family to give visitors a historical perspective of the house and an inside look into life in the early twentieth century. The Magic House was founded by two St. Louis women, Jody Newman and Barbie Freund, who volunteered three years of their time to create a cultural institution that would be both educational and fun. When the Museum first opened its doors in October 1979, the facilities were designed to accommodate 30,000 visitors each year, however, during its first year of operations, the Museum welcomed 165,000 guests. Since its inaugural year, The Magic House has undergone several renovations and expansions.

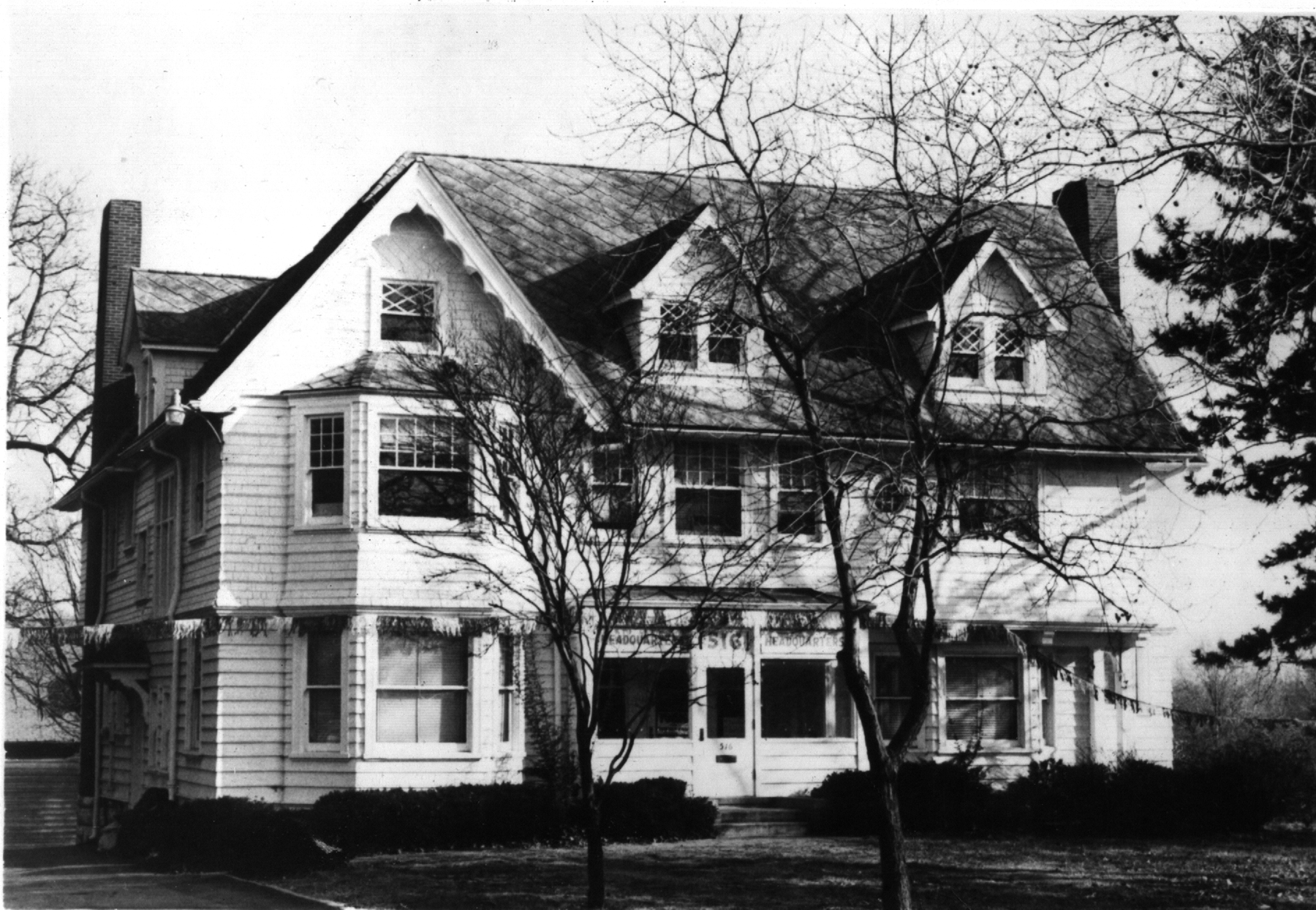
Original House

The first expansion took place in 1985, when The Magic House opened a 2,000-square-foot area designed exclusively for children ages 1 to 6 called, "A Little Bit of Magic." In 1989, an addition was constructed on the front and south side of the house. This included a large wrap-around porch, an expanded lobby and an elevator that allowed the Museum to be accessible to all visitors. In 1997, the Museum underwent a major expansion which added the Children's Village, Math Path, Fitness Center and an Education Wing. In 2001, The Magic House opened Backyard Magic, an outdoor facility featuring a Victorian Education Pavilion, a Children's Sculpture Garden and an outdoor Exhibit Patio. Again in 2008, The Magic House underwent a major expansion as it added a 25,000-square-foot addition nearly doubling the size of the Museum.

=== Programs/ Operations ===
The Magic House is a self-supporting 501 (c)(3) not-for-profit organization that relies on the generous support of individual, foundation and corporate donors. 80 percent of funding comes from earned revenue sources such as admissions, the gift shop and the Picnic Basket Cafe. The Magic House does not receive ongoing public support from tax revenue. In addition to daily operations and admissions at the museum, The Magic House provides outreach programs, field trips and special events. Over 50,000 students participate in field trips at The Magic House annually. With support from several corporations and foundations, The Magic House is able to bring educational outreach programs to schools, libraries and hospitals, reaching more than 25,000 children each year. The Star Society annual fund, the Education Program Fund and support from private foundations and corporations provide free field trips, outreach programs and other hands-on learning experiences for children, families and schools in need. The Magic House also provides events and programs for special populations including military families, seriously ill youth, special needs youth and foster children. In addition to paid staff, The Magic House relies on more than 250 adult and youth volunteers each year. In 2015, there were a total 6,116 volunteer hours donated to The Magic House. The Magic House is a member of the American Alliance of Museums and the Association of Children's Museums.

== See also ==
- List of museums in Missouri
