= Arrow Rock Historic District =

Historic district in Missouri, United States

- Arrow Rock
- U.S. National Register of Historic Places
- U.S. National Historic Landmark District
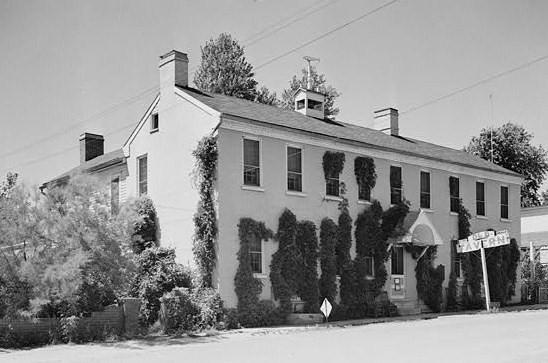
- Houston Tavern in 1940

- Location within Missouri Location within the United States
- Location: Arrow Rock, Missouri
- Coordinates: 39°4′0″N 92°56′41″W
- Area: 260 acres (1.1 km^{2})
- Built: 1817
- NRHP reference No.: 66000422

Significant dates
- Added to NRHP: October 15, 1966
- Designated NHLD: May 23, 1963

Arrow Rock Historic District is a National Historic Landmark District encompassing the village of Arrow Rock, Missouri and the adjacent Arrow Rock State Historic Site. The Arrow Rock area was where the historic Santa Fe Trail crossed the Missouri River, and was thus a key stopping point during the settlement of the American West. The 260-acre (1.1 km^{2}) historic district was declared a National Historic Landmark in 1963.

== Description and history ==
Arrow Rock is named for a stone formation that has been a recognized landmark on the Missouri River since the 18th century, supposedly prized by local Native Americans as a source of stone for tools and weapons. A ferry was established in the area in 1815, providing westward access to settlers passing through Franklin on the eastern bank. In the 1820s this route became known as the Santa Fe Trail, and became a major route by which settlers traveled west. The town of Arrow Rock provided services to these travelers, with a tavern (the still-standing 1834 J. Huston Tavern) and a fresh-water spring among the amenities. By the mid-19th century the town had a population of 1,000. As the trail declined in importance, so did the town's population.

Since 1912, Arrow Rock has transformed from a small river town into a major heritage-tourism center thanks to an active historic preservation movement. In 1963 it was recognized as a National Historic Landmark site, in 2006 the National Trust for Historic Preservation listed it as one of its "Dozen Distinctive Destination" sites, and in 2008 it was recognized as a "Preserve America Community." For most of the 20th century, preservation and interpretation activities focused almost exclusively on the upscale white, male components, ignoring the role of the majority population. Beginning in 1996, Arrow Rock redefined has utilized public history and archaeology to emphasize new interpretive programs that Pay much more attention to the African American heritage. Preservationists and historians are eager to involve this previously marginalized descendant community.

The historic district includes both the incorporated village of Arrow Rock, and the grounds of the adjacent state historic site, which partly overlap each other. The village includes a significant number of surviving pre-Civil War buildings, including the tavern, a courthouse, jail, and several churches. Within the bounds of the state park is the George Caleb Bingham House, a modest brick structure (now restored) that was the home of frontier artist George Caleb Bingham.

== See also ==
- List of National Historic Landmarks in Missouri
- National Register of Historic Places listings in Saline County, Missouri
