= Arthur F. McClure II Archives and University Museum =

Coordinates: 38°45′21.3″N 94°44′14.4″W

The Arthur F. McClure Archives and University Museum contains a variety of historical documents and artifacts pertaining to the history of the University of Central Missouri as well as containing other collections that focus on larger histories. The archives and museum serves the University of Central Missouri students as well as the general public. The archives are often frequented by individuals researching genealogy as well as students looking for resources on notable events that occurred during the twentieth century.

== Background ==
Arthur F. McClure II was a professor of history at the University of Central Missouri (formerly Central Missouri State University) after receiving his doctoral degree from the University of Kansas in 1966. McClure wrote histories focusing on the Truman Presidency and the Post-war era. He also was a member of the Historic Preservation Committee in Warrensburg, Missouri. McClure served in Washington, D.C., organizing the Central Archives at the National Archives. The UCM archives and museum were dedicated to Arthur F. McClure II due to his extensive involvement with preservation in the community.

== Collections ==
- The historical documents from the University of Central Missouri: These documents include but are not limited to yearbooks, catalogs, newspapers, sports history and memorabilia, photographs. The archives also include any artifacts donated by alumnus and faculty members. These artifacts serve to provide a well-rounded history of the University and its students. During the fire in 1915, many documents were lost. However, the University has been able to replace some information on students from that period thanks to donations from the public.
- The Arthur F. McClure Twentieth Century American History Collection: This section of the archives includes newspapers, magazine and journal articles focusing on twentieth century history. Named in honor of Arthur F. McClure II, this collection also includes an impressive selection of documents pertaining to African American history.
- The Nance Saudi Arabian, Middle East, and Asian collection includes artifacts from the aforementioned countries. Currently, the university has an exhibit detailing the ARAMCO corporation in Saudi Arabia.
- The Rohmiller Seashell Collection contains over ten thousand seashells from around the world available for study.
- The Haymaker Collection of Guatemalan Artifacts contains jewelry and textiles from Guatemala.
- The Fred W. Schmidt Meso-American Collection.
- The collection of Native American Artifacts has items from Native American groups from around North America (Arctic, Plains, Northwest and Southwest).
- The University also has prehistoric artifacts that have been collected from the surrounding areas and donated to the museum.

== World's Fair Mirror ==
The archives and museum also serves as storage for some of the universities delicate decorative pieces. One such artefact is a mirror that was donated to the university from the 1904 World's Fair. In 1904, Missouri hosted the Louisiana Purchase Exposition in St. Louis (otherwise known as the 1904 World's Fair). This exhibition had thousands of artifacts that celebrated the centennial of the purchase of the Louisiana Territory in 1904. Different buildings were constructed to celebrate the unique features of the states that grew out of the purchase, including Missouri itself. A mirror from the Missouri building was donated to what is now the University of Central Missouri and has hung in UCM’s recreational facilities for over a century.

The mirror was first placed in the Dockery building that was constructed in 1904 to serve as UCM’s gymnasium. Over the years, the gymnasium has moved from the Dockery building to the new Morrow Student Recreation and Wellness Center. During the construction of the new recreation center, the mirror was held in the McClure Archives. Since construction on the recreation center, the mirror once again decorates the student recreation center.
