= Arrow Rock, Missouri =

- Village
- Location of Arrow Rock, Missouri
- Coordinates: 39°4′12″N 92°56′50″W
- Country: United States
- State: Missouri
- County: Saline

Area
  - Total: 0.14 sq mi (0.35 km^{2})
  - Land: 0.14 sq mi (0.35 km^{2})
  - Water: 0 sq mi (0.00 km^{2})
- Elevation: 722 ft (220 m)

Population (2020)
  - Total: 60
  - Density: 450/sq mi (173.8/km^{2})
- Time zone: UTC-6 (Central (CST))
  - Summer (DST): UTC-5 (CDT)
- ZIP code: 65320
- Area code: 660
- FIPS code: 29-02044
- GNIS feature ID: 2397439
- Website: arrowrock.org

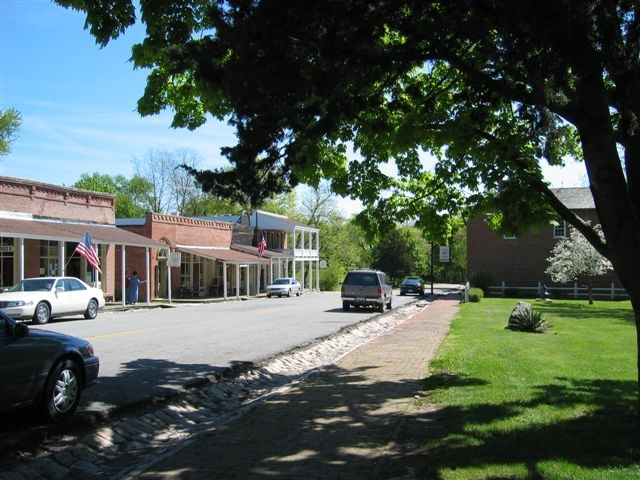
Boardwalk storefront on left, J. Huston Tavern on right. Stone gutters laid by slaves in 1858 line the street.

Arrow Rock is a village in Saline County, Missouri, United States, located near the Missouri River. The entire village is part of the National Historic Landmark Arrow Rock Historic District, designated by the Department of the Interior, National Park Service in 1963. It is significant in the history of Westward Expansion, the Santa Fe Trail, and 19th-century artist George Caleb Bingham. The town is well known for the Arrow Rock Lyceum Theatre, hosting over 33,000 patrons every year.

The first state-designated historic site is located here. Restoration of a 19th-century tavern in 1923 marked the beginning of historic preservation in Missouri. Many structures within the village are individually listed on the National Register of Historic Places. Several locations are also certified sites of the Lewis and Clark National Historic Trail and the Santa Fe National Historic Trail.

The village retains much of its 19th-century Boonslick character, and it attracts more than 100,000 visitors per year. Given the importance of heritage tourism to the village's economy, architectural ordinances implemented in 2004 provide guidance for both new construction and restorations of existing structures.

The town has numerous bed and breakfast establishments, and a modern campground nearby is maintained by the Missouri Division of State Parks. Local government consists of an elected five-member Board of Trustees. The Trustees elect their chair person (mayor).

== Geography ==
According to the United States Census Bureau, the village has a total area of 0.13 square miles (0.34 km^{2}), all land.

== Demographics ==
Historical population
Census	Pop.	Note	%±
1880	304		—
1890	350		15.1%
1900	358		2.3%
1910	336		−6.1%
1920	286		−14.9%
1930	304		6.3%
1940	247		−18.7%
1950	170		−31.2%
1960	245		44.1%
1970	81		−66.9%
1980	82		1.2%
1990	70		−14.6%
2000	79		12.9%
2010	56		−29.1%
2020	60		7.1%
U.S. Decennial Census

=== 2010 census ===
As of the census of 2010, there were 56 people, 36 households, and 16 families residing in the village. The population density was 430.8 inhabitants per square mile (166.3/km^{2}). There were 61 housing units at an average density of 469.2 per square mile (181.2/km^{2}). The racial makeup of the village was 98.2% White and 1.8% from two or more races.

There were 36 households, of which 2.8% had children under the age of 18 living with them, 38.9% were married couples living together, 5.6% had a female householder with no husband present, and 55.6% were non-families. 47.2% of all households were made up of individuals, and 8.4% had someone living alone who was 65 years of age or older. The average household size was 1.56 and the average family size was 2.06.

The median age in the village was 61.7 years. 1.8% of residents were under the age of 18; 0% were between the ages of 18 and 24; 12.6% were from 25 to 44; 44.6% were from 45 to 64; and 41.1% were 65 years of age or older. The gender makeup of the village was 46.4% male and 53.6% female.

=== 2000 census ===
As of the census of 2000, there were 79 people, 39 households, and 24 families residing in the town. The population density was 592.5 inhabitants per square mile (228.8/km^{2}). There were 62 housing units at an average density of 465.0 per square mile (179.5/km^{2}). The racial makeup of the town was 100.00% White.

There were 39 households, out of which 17.9% had children under the age of 18 living with them, 48.7% were married couples living together, 12.8% had a female householder with no husband present, and 35.9% were non-families. 30.8% of all households were made up of individuals, and 20.5% had someone living alone who was 65 years of age or older. The average household size was 2.03 and the average family size was 2.52.

In the town the population was spread out, with 13.9% under the age of 18, 3.8% from 18 to 24, 11.4% from 25 to 44, 35.4% from 45 to 64, and 35.4% who were 65 years of age or older. The median age was 57 years. For every 100 females, there were 97.5 males. For every 100 females age 18 and over, there were 88.9 males.

The median income for a household in the town was $45,000, and the median income for a family was $46,875. Males had a median income of $46,250 versus $35,417 for females. The per capita income for the town was $28,344. None of the population and none of the families were below the poverty line.

== Notable people ==
- William Becknell – the "Father of the Santa Fe Trail" and Saline County judge
- George Caleb Bingham – artist
- Asa Finley – settled west of Arrow Rock and was state representative from Saline County
- Claiborne Fox Jackson – Arrow Rock's first postmaster
- John Beauchamp Jones – tended a store in Arrow Rock and was an author
- Meredith Miles Marmaduke – platted the town of Arrow Rock and served as Missouri's eighth governor
- John Sappington Marmaduke – son of Meredith Marmaduke, became Governor of Missouri in 1884
- John Sappington – first physician in Saline County

== History ==
Arrow Rock was the name of a prominent flint-bearing bluff on the Missouri River. The name first appeared on a French map from 1732 as "Pierre a Fleche", meaning "Rock of Arrows". Edwin James on the 1819 Yellowstone Expedition wrote, "Arrow Rock is so called from its having been formerly resorted to by neighboring Indians for the stone used to point their arrows." The two dominant Native American tribes in the area encountered by French traders early in the 18th century were the Missouria and the Osage.

The bluff continued to be a landmark to explorers and travelers for over 150 years. Lewis and Clark passed by on June 9, 1804, and noted "Several small Channels running out of the River below a Bluff [Cliff of rocks called the arrow rock] & Prairie (Called the Prairie of Arrows)". In 1808, William Clark passed through the area again on his way to construct Fort Osage noting a "Big Arrow Rock" and a "Little Arrow Rock" just upstream from it. He declared the area would "make a handsome spot for a town."

During the first half of the 19th century, this region of central Missouri was called "Boonslick Country" so named for the Boone's salt lick about four miles east of Arrow Rock in adjacent Howard County. The term "lick" derived from wildlife licking salt from the ground around the briny springs. Nathan and Daniel Morgan Boone, sons of famed frontiersman Daniel Boone, manufactured salt here from 1805 to 1812, shipping it to St. Louis. Their partners and co-operators, James and Jesse Morrison, continued the salt business until 1833. Salt boiling continued intermittently until the 1860s. The site of this early frontier industry is now managed as Boone's Lick State Historic Site by the Missouri Division of State Parks.

Euro-American settlers arrived in 1810, establishing small settlements several miles to the north and to the south of the Arrow Rock bluff and in the river bottoms on the opposite side of the Missouri River. During the War of 1812, these settlers built small defensive forts as protection from Ioway, Sac & Fox Indians allied to Great Britain. When Fort Osage closed in 1813, the fort's factor (trader) George C. Sibley moved his operation to the Arrow Rock bluff during the winter of 1813–1814 to carry on trade with the Osage Indians. This helped maintain their loyalty the United States during the war.

By 1815, a ferry was established at the site of Arrow Rock. Westbound settlers poured into the area, crossing the Missouri River on the Arrow Rock ferry. Santa Fe trading caravans departing from Franklin began crossing at the ferry in 1821. From 1819 to 1833, the ferry was owned by Judge David Todd, the uncle of Mary Todd Lincoln. Judge William B. Napton noted that 1827 was an especially busy year for the ferry as the population of Saline County swelled that year. In 1849 and 1850 the covered wagons of emigrants to California "were hardly ever out of sight at Arrow Rock." Several Arrow Rock residents continued to be involved in the Santa Fe trade as late as the beginning of the Civil War, 1861.

The town was founded in June 1829 and originally called "Philadelphia". Some documents refer to it as "New Philadelphia". However, in 1833 the state legislature changed the name because the locale was better known as 'Arrow Rock'. Joseph Huston, one of the town commissioners, built a two-story brick building in 1834. Due to Arrow Rock's location on the Missouri River and along the Santa Fe Trail, travelers undoubtedly asked Huston for overnight accommodations. He began building frame or log additions to the brick building and by 1840 was widely known as a hotel-keeper. The J. Huston Tavern also housed a store and a ballroom used for dances and a meeting hall. As the building passed to other owners, it became known as the Neill House, Scripture House, City Hotel and Old Tavern. The J. Huston Tavern houses the oldest continuously operating restaurant west of the Mississippi and is today operated by the Missouri Division of State Parks in partnership with the Friends of Arrow Rock, Inc.

Settlers in the Arrow Rock area were predominantly migrants from the Upper South of Virginia, Kentucky, and Tennessee. They brought slaves and southern culture with them. The town developed as a thriving river port, exporting tobacco and hemp from plantations in the region. Hemp was the most important cash crop in Saline County. Before the Civil War, hemp was made into ropes and bags for baling cotton. Wheat, corn, beef, pork and mules were also shipped from Arrow Rock to supply the cotton districts of the Mississippi delta. The agricultural production of the Boonslick Country depended on slave labor just as cotton production did in the South. This symbiotic relationship led most residents of Arrow Rock and the Boonslick Country to support the South during the Civil War. Saline County and other Missouri counties with a high population of enslaved African Americans later became identified as “Little Dixie.” According to historian Dr. Christopher Phillips, Arrow Rock represented a unique blending of western frontier idealism and southern traditions.

During the town's early decades, it was the site of a slave market, and the auction block continued to stand on the river bluff in front of the J. Huston Tavern for many decades after the Emancipation Proclamation and the U.S. victory in the Civil War eradicated human enslavement. Because of the slave market's prominence, the large bend in the Missouri River below the town was known as "N***** Bend."

Arrow Rock's population peaked at 1,000 by 1860. Even as late as 1872, the town was considered one of the busiest river ports between St. Louis and Kansas City, Missouri. During the Civil War there were no major battles in the area, but guerrilla raids and murders disrupted agricultural production and river commerce. Union militia enforced martial law on the town during most of the war. Town government conducted little business in 1861 and 1862 and did not convene at all from 1863 to 1865. The population began to decline after the war and railroads began supplanting steamboat commerce. Arrow Rock failed in its bids to secure a rail line and a bridge across the Missouri River. The rapid post war growth of urban areas such as Kansas City, St. Louis and Chicago began drawing away residents with the promise of better jobs. The town was swept by disastrous fires in 1864, 1872 and 1901. By the turn of the 20th century the population had declined to around 300.

Prior to the Civil War, Arrow Rock's black residents worked as household or domestic slaves or as laborers at the docks and business warehouses. Many were skilled tradesmen who were rented out by their masters to business contractors. Much of the town's infrastructure such as the massive stone gutters lining Main Street, were built by enslaved African-Americans. Following emancipation in 1865, Arrow Rock's African-American population grew as former plantation slaves moved into town. Gradually they were able to purchase their own homes, mostly on the north side of town. By 1880, 51% of the town's population was African-American. Owing to segregation of the time, they had to develop their own churches, schools and social institutions. The last black resident of the community died in 2009.

Arrow Rock's connection with the Santa Fe Trail led to national recognition by the Old Trails Society of the Daughters of the American Revolution (DAR) in 1912. As DAR interest in the community grew, they persuaded the Missouri legislature to purchase and preserve the "Old Tavern" (J. Huston Tavern) in 1923. Acreage around the Tavern was purchased as a state park. This was the beginning of publicly funded historic preservation in Missouri and one of the first units of the new Missouri State Park system. The park grew to 169 acres, about a third of which lies within town boundaries. In 1976 the facilities designation was changed from park to historic site to better reflect its cultural mission.

The Friends of Arrow Rock, Inc., formed in 1959 to help preserve historic structures outside the state historic site boundary. They give guided tram tours of town from April though October and work closely with Arrow Rock State Historic in conducting education and interpretive programs about the village.

== Town ordinances ==
December 23, 1847, Article 6 of Laws for Conducting Town Meetings; "It shall be the duty of all members of said Board of Trustees to be present at every meeting, and for failing so to do, shall forfeit and pay the sum of fifty cents, unless excused from said fine, upon a reasonable cause given for said absentee absence."

January 1849 “Be it ordained &c that any one guilty of fighting, or loud and boisterous quarrelling, or engaging in any mob, or making unusual noises, furious or violent riding within the corporation, upon conviction before a magistrate shall be fined in any sum not less than two dollars and fifty cents and not more than twenty dollars."

March 28, 1850 "It was resolved that Benjamin Hawpe be appointed Captain of Patrol and that William Parks, E. K. Chase & William H. McCowan be and are hereby appointed patrols for the Town of Arrow Rock for six months from date whose duty it shall be to guard the Town and prevent the unlawful meeting of Negroes and see that no Negro is out from home after nine o’clock at night without a pass and if so found shall be dealt with as the Law directs."

September 6, 1858, the Town Board ordained "...that any person guilty of firing or setting off fire works, fire crackers or throwing turpentine [lighting then throwing it in the air] and gass balls [explosive carbide] ...shall on conviction be fined not less than one or more than five dollars for each offense."

March 10, 1868 "Be it ordained from & after this date by the trustees of the corporation of the town of Arrow Rock that all and any Billiard Table within the corporate limits of this town, or within one half a mile of the same shall pay an annual tax of Ten Dollars, tax, the same due semiannually in advance." The board apparently felt their authority extended beyond the corporation limits.

June 2, 1871, the Town Board acting on a complaint from Mr. L. D. Lindsey ordered the Constable to suppress the game of croquet because the players "frequently indulge in profane and obscene language." The Board has never rescinded the order so modern day residents periodically will get up a game of "outlaw croquet" in town.

April 8, 1872, the Town Board “Ordered that the privy in rear of Levy Bros. Store be declared a nuisance, also D.D. Greens’ Cow-yard.”

== Archaeology ==
Archaeologist Dr. Timothy E. Baumann McClung Museum of Natural History and Culture, University of East Tennessee began conducting surveys in 1995 to explore African-American life and culture from the slavery period through emancipation and into the early 20th century. He has led teams in excavating several households, a schoolhouse, a church, and a Masonic Lodge that were part of Arrow Rock's African-American community. Dr. Baumann confirmed that the Masonic Lodge had been built over the site of the Caldwell Pottery Works, the third largest pottery works in Missouri during the 1850s and 1860s. Remains of a beehive kiln, outbuildings and thousands of shards of pottery and testing clay were uncovered. In 2005, the probable site of Sibley's trading house for the Osage was surveyed, although few remains were found due to the temporary nature of the post and subsequent agricultural activities on the grounds. Dr. Baumann continues to serve as a museum consultant for Friends of Arrow Rock, Inc. He has also excavated slave quarters at two neighboring plantation sites, Prairie Park and Oak Grove.

Several excavations have been carried out on state historic site property. Archaeologists from the University of Missouri have conducted several surveys and excavations on the grounds identifying the remains of a 19th-century mercantile store, the town's first public school and a livery stable. Larry Grantham and Brant Vollmann former archaeologists with the Missouri Division of State Parks have conducted limited excavations of a small 19th century store and the grounds around the Dr. Mathew W. Hall House and the J. Huston Tavern. Members of the Missouri Archaeological Society surface surveyed several empty town lots in 2016 and found evidence of 19th century businesses and warehouses. No evidence of a permanent Native American village has been located at Arrow Rock. However, evidence indicates the area had been a major manufacturing site for flint points dating back at least 10,000 years.

== Arts ==
Arrow Rock's tradition in the arts has its roots in the residency of George Caleb Bingham. He began painting portraits of local residents in 1833. His earliest extant portraits are those of Dr. John Sappington and Jane B. Sappington done in 1834. These two portraits along with a second set of portraits of Dr. and Mrs. Sappington he completed in 1844 an 1875 portrait of James M. Piper, several original lithographic prints and Bingham family memorabilia are on display at the Arrow Rock State Historic Site Visitors’ Center Museum.

Jane Froman (1907–1980) was a popular singer and actress during the 1930s through 1950s. She had her own television show in the 1950s and was known for her charitable work with sick children. A native Missourian, she retired to Columbia Missouri. From 1969 through 1972 she did charitable work for a music camp to help children develop musical abilities. Established in the Old Schoolhouse of Arrow Rock, it was named as the Jane Froman Music Center. The center attracted nationally known artists to Arrow Rock for summer concerts and she performed Christmas concerts there. Although the music center closed in 1972, it gave impetus to development of other artistic venues in town.

The Arrow Rock Lyceum Theater was established in 1960 in the abandoned Baptist Church. Missouri's oldest repertory theater, the Lyceum now produces Broadway caliber musicals and plays from June through September with special holiday productions in December. Actors come from as far away as New York and California and audiences are drawn from across Missouri. A 408-seat auditorium was added in 1995 and the old church building itself now serves as the box office and concession area.

In 1973, a musical version of Mark Twain's "Tom Sawyer" was filmed here. The movie, Tom Sawyer, starred Johnny Whitaker as Tom, Jeff East as Huckleberry Finn, Celeste Holm as Aunt Polly, Warren Oates as Muff Potter and Jodie Foster in her third movie role, as Becky Thatcher. Many of the town's buildings and landscapes are recognizable in the film. The following year, Jeff East reprised his role in Huckleberry Finn which was partially filmed here. Paul Winfield co-starred as Jim and comedian Harvey Korman as The King. On July 4, 2007, the town also celebrated the 35th anniversary of the film. One hundred people participated in a parade and well over 2,000 spectators lined Main Street from the old schoolhouse to Second Street. Johnny Whitaker, Jeff East and Celeste Holm served as parade marshals and shared their fond memories of making the film with the crowd, and renewed acquaintances they had made with local residents during filming.

In addition to being the home of the Lyceum Theatre, Arrow Rock continues its tradition of supporting the arts by periodically hosting art and crafts shows and workshops and special concerts throughout the year. The second full weekend of each October the town hosts the Fall Heritage Festival hosting a wide variety of craftspeople, artisans, reenactors and musical entertainment.

== Parks and public lands ==
Established in 1923, Arrow Rock State Historic Site is administered by the Missouri Division of State Parks. It was one of the first three units to come into the Missouri state park system. The 169-acre site overlooks the Missouri valley and encompasses about one-fourth of the village. The site contains a large visitor center/museum complex, four-acre fishing lake, picnic area with a playground, 1 1/2 miles of hiking trails and a 48-unit campground with modern amenities.

The state historic site is adjacent to the 1,871-acre Jameson Island Unit of the Big Muddy National Fish and Wildlife Refuge, administered by the United States Fish & Wildlife Service. Established in 1994 following the disastrous flood of 1993, the wetlands and waterways of the refuge provides critical habitat for endangered species such as pallid and lake sturgeon. The refuge also benefits numerous other wildlife species. The area has seen the resurgence in deer, turkey, beaver and otter populations. Species that were absent such as bobcats, Mississippi kites, bald eagles and pileated woodpeckers have returned in recent years. The refuge has minimal development and offers opportunities for hiking and bird watching. Hunting and fishing are also permitted in accordance with state regulations.

== Education ==
It is in the Hardeman R-X School District, an elementary school district.

== Historic properties ==
Arrow Rock State Historic Site and Arrow Rock Historic District

- J. Huston Tavern (1834) Considered the signature building of Arrow Rock, the Federal-style brick architecture demonstrates the southern heritage of early settlers. In addition to dining facilities, several rooms are restored to their early appearance.
- George Caleb Bingham House (1837) Noted artist George C. Bingham built this house in 1837. Bingham traveled extensively and was seldom in Arrow Rock for any lengthy period, but his family continued to occupy the house. He sold the house in 1845 but retained the deed until 1857. The Bingham House has its own separate designation as a National Historic Landmark.
- Dr. Mathew W. Hall House (1846) This Greek Revival style house was built by Dr. Hall a noted civic leader and physician.
- Old Jail aka Calaboose (1873) A log jail was burned by an arsonist in 1872 and replaced with this stone arch vault jail.
- Courthouse (1834) Log structure restored to represent the county courthouse of 1839-1840 when Arrow Rock was the Saline County seat of government.
- Lawless House and Farmstead (1903) A turn of the century Queen Anne/Eastlake farm home sporting modern amenities such as carbide lights and a water pump in the kitchen.
- Big Spring (1829) Burton Lawless granted free use of the spring to the town in 1829. Tradition states that early Santa Fe caravans watered their stock here before heading west.
- Academy Boarding House (1829) The Arrow Rock Academy (no longer standing) was a private school incorporated in 1843 and students boarded in this two story log house.
- WPA Shelter House (1936) The Works Progress Administration made improvements to parks during the Great Depression such as this stone picnic shelter.
- WPA Gazebo (1936) The Gazebo functions as a small picnic shelter.

Friends of Arrow Rock

- Log Cabin (1830) Originally located southwest of Arrow Rock, it was relocated here to save it from destruction.
- Masonic Lodge Hall and Craft Shop (1868) Arrow Rock Lodge No. 55 built the structure in 1868 and met on the second floor until 2009. Craft Club members have sold handmade items on the lower level since 1961.
- Miller-Bradford House (1839) Sam Miller built this house then sold it to Dr. Charles Bradford, a grandson-in-law to Dr. Sappington. Restored in 1959 by Bill and Cora Lee Miller, it was the first private restoration in the village.
- Christian Church (1872) Johnny and Nanny Sites donated property for this church. Now a restored museum, the church was the scene of Tom Sawyer's funeral in the 1972 film. The church is still used for weddings and receptions.
- Brown's Chapel Free Will Baptist Church (1869) African-Americans built this church north of city limits. It served as the first school for African-Americans and in 1870 had 66 students. Zack Bush used a team of mules to move the church to its current location in 1881.
- Black History Museum/Brown Lodge (1881) Following emancipation, freed slaves moved into town and began purchasing their own homes and developed their own social institutions such as this Masonic Lodge. This was considered the most important of several fraternal lodges within the black community.
- John P. Sites Gun Shop (1866) Sites learned gunsmithing from his father and moved to Arrow Rock in 1844. His first shop on Main Street was possibly destroyed by a guerrilla raid in 1864. He moved to this location which is the only known functioning restoration of a 19th-century gunsmith's shop in the United States still in its original location.
- John P. Sites House (1838) Sites purchased this house next to the gun shop in 1866 and by 1872 had raised the roof and made additions to it for his wife Nanny.
- Dr. John Sappington Museum (1974) This modern Georgian style structure houses exhibits which interpret the life and medical contributions of Dr. Sappington.

Private

- Arrow Rock Lyceum Theatre (1872) originally a Baptist church, since 1960 this professional repertory theater has been producing Broadway-caliber plays and musicals. A 408-seat auditorium was added to the rear of the building in 1993.
- Boardwalk Storefronts (1902) Fires in 1872 and 1901 destroyed the original two story structures from the 1850s. The rebuilt single story stores now house a variety of antique and gift shops and post office.
- Arrow Rock Cemetery (1849) Still an active cemetery, many names familiar in Arrow Rock history are found here.
- Sanders A.H. Townsend House (1860) The Ancell Lumber Company of Arrow Rock was engaged by Saunders Townsend to build this Greek Revival house as a wedding present for his son Sanders.
- Prairie Park (1849) This two and a half story mansion is one of the finest surviving examples of 19th century Greek Revival architecture in Missouri. It was built by William B. Sappington, businessman, farmer, banker and community leader.
- Old Schoolhouse (1923) The white public school was built on this site in 1892 but burned in 1910. The second building burned in 1923 and was replaced with the current structure. The school closed due to consolidation in 1954. The building now houses village government offices and the Stolberg-Jackson Community Center.
- Federated Church (1852) Originally the Methodist Episcopal Church, this church still has an active congregation.
- Zion Church (1870) The congregation is no longer active and the building now serves as the Masonic Lodge Hall No. 55
- African Public School (1948) The black school was first built in 1892 from materials salvaged from the white public school when it was torn down and moved. The black school burned down and was rebuilt as brick in 1939, burned again and was rebuilt in 1948. Schools were integrated by 1956 and the African school became a private residence which it is today.

== Reference sources ==
- 1881, History of Saline County, Missouri Historical Company, St. Louis Missouri 999 pages
- 1904, Past and Present of Saline County, Missouri by William Barclay Napton, B.F. Bowen & Co. Indianapolis and Chicago. 975 pages
- 1914, Along the Old Trail Vol. I Pioneer Sketches of Arrow Rock and Vicinity by Thomas C. Rainey, published by the Marshall Chapter of the Daughters of the American Revolution, Marshall MO. 94 pages
- 1937, Westward With Dragoons: the Journal of William Clark on His Expedition to Establish Fort Osage, August 25 to September 22, 1808, edited by Kate Gregg, Published by The Ovid Bell Press, Fulton, MO. 104 pages
- 1959, Arrow Rock, Missouri, The Bulletin Missouri Historical Society, Volume 15, Number 3 by Charles van Ravenswaay, Published by Missouri Historical Society, St. Louis MO. 21 pages
- 1968, Missouri's National Historic Landmarks, Village of Arrow Rock & George Caleb Bingham by Dorothy Caldwell, Friends of Arrow Rock, Inc., reprint from Missouri Historical Review, Volume 61 Issue 4, July 1967. 13 pages
- 1972, Arrow Rock: Where Wheels Started West by Jean Tyree Hamilton, Friends of Arrow Rock Inc., Arrow Rock MO. 63 pages
- 1975, Dr. John Sappington of Saline County, Missouri 1776–1856 by Thomas Hall, Friends of Arrow Rock Inc., Arrow Rock Missouri. 32 pages
- 1981, Arrow Rock 20th Century Frontier Town, edited by Marcia Prouse, University of Missouri School of Journalism, Columbia Missouri. 203 pages
- 2000, African-American Archaeology: A Missouri Perspective by Timothy Baumann, The Missouri Archaeologist 59:39-98.
- 2000, Missouri's Confederate: Claiborne Fox Jackson and the Creation of Southern Identity in the Border West by Christopher Phillips, University of Missouri Press, Columbia Missouri, 350 pages
- 2001, Because That's Where My Roots Are; Searching for Patterns of African-American Ethnicity in Arrow Rock, Missouri. Timothy Baumann Ph.D. dissertation University of Tennessee-Knoxville.
- 2004, Arrow Rock: Crossroads of the Missouri Frontier by Michael E. Dickey, Friends of Arrow Rock Inc., Arrow Rock Missouri. 300 pages
- 2005, Historical Archaeology in Arrow Rock, Missouri by Timothy Baumann, The Missouri Archaeologist 66:19-39.
- 2005, Arrow Rock Story of a Missouri Village, by Authorine Wilson Phillips, University of Missouri Press, Columbia Missouri. 184 pages
- 2008, Arrow Rock Where the Past is Future, edited by Abigail Pheiffer, University of Missouri Press, Columbia Missouri. 223 pages
- 2011, A Historical Perspective of Civic Engagement and Interpreting Cultural Diversity in Arrow Rock, Missouri by Timothy Baumann, Historical Archaeology 45(1):114-134
- 2012, Arrow Rock Images, by Sandy Selby and Thomas Hall III, Arcadia Publishing, Charleston South Carolina. 128 pages
