= Hardeman =

Hardeman may refer to:

- Hardeman (surname)
- Hardeman County (disambiguation), two counties in the United States
- Hardeman, Santa Cruz, town in Bolivia
- Hardeman, Missouri, a community in the United States
