= Elmwood Township, Saline County, Missouri =

Inactive township in the US state of Missouri

Coordinates: 39.0853°N 93.3956°W

Elmwood Township is an inactive township in Saline County, in the U.S. state of Missouri.

Elmwood Township was erected in 1870, taking its name from the community of Elmwood, Missouri.
