= Saline City =

Saline City may refer to:

- Saline City, former name of Drawbridge, California
- Saline City, Missouri
- Saline City, Indiana
