= New Frankfort =

New Frankfort may refer to:

- New Frankfort, Indiana
- New Frankfort, Missouri

== See also ==
- New Frankfurt
