= Free Will Baptist Church of Pennytown =

Historic church in Missouri, United States

- U.S. National Register of Historic Places
- Location within Missouri Location within the United States
- Nearest city: Marshall, Missouri
- Coordinates: 39°0′59″N 93°10′47″W
- Area: 0.5 acres (0.20 ha)
- Built: 1925
- Built by: Percy Watson, Will McCue, Richard Lewis, Mike Molden, et al.
- NRHP reference No.: 88000388
- Added to NRHP: April 19, 1988

Free Will Baptist Church of Pennytown is a historic African-American church in Pennytown, a community of unincorporated Saline County, Missouri 8 miles (13 km) south of Marshall. It was built in 1925 and added to the National Register of Historic Places in 1988.

== History of Pennytown ==
=== The community ===
Today the church is all that remains of the small freedman's hamlet of Pennytown. The community was founded around 1871 by Joseph Penny, a former slave who moved to Saline County, Missouri from Kentucky shortly after the American Civil War. He used his life savings to purchase an eight-acre tract of land, intending it as a place of refuge and new beginnings for recently freed slaves. Penny divided the eight acres into building lots, selling them to newly arrived residents at affordable prices. Other freed slaves purchased small tracts of land around the village as well so that by 1879 the size of the community had increased about forty families and sixty-four acres. By 1880 Pennytown had a population of around 200 African-Americans residing there, with a school, two churches, a blacksmith shop and other businesses. While other freedmen's settlements suffered from predation by land speculators and unscrupulous neighbors, Pennytown largely avoided such chicanery. This was mostly due to Joseph Penny's insistence that residents hold clear legal title to their properties.

Because they owned the land upon which they lived, Pennytown residents were able to avoid the pitfalls and abuses of sharecropping that befell many former slaves in the postbellum era. Instead, the men of the community were able to earn wages as laborers on area farms and in Marshall. The women largely worked too, as domestic help. With the working age adults gone most of the day, the older members of Pennytown served as caregivers for the children in a communal arrangement. Pennytown began to lose population in the 1920s as more farms began using machinery thus reducing the need for hired labor. The Great Depression in the 1930s further destroyed work opportunities in and around the rural community. The last family moved away from Pennytown in 1943, leaving only a few elderly residents who remained until their deaths.

=== The church ===
In 1886 a white neighbor donated a half-acre plot of land to be used for a house of worship. Prior to that time various homes in the community had been used for church services or, weather permitting, in neighboring brush arbors. A simple wood-frame church was erected on the current spot, but it was destroyed by fire in 1924. It was replaced with the current tile block structure built in 1925 to 1926. Not having the funds for materials to construct a new church all at once, over a period of months church members would purchase a few tile blocks at a time as money allowed and stacked them on the site. Finally in the fall of 1925 the foundation was laid. The majority of the construction was done by the men of the community and the church over the succeeding months. At first lighting in the completed church was provided by a large suspended carbide lamp. Later, kerosene lamps were added to holders along the walls.

Through the mid-20th century as the village population of Pennytown dwindled the church building also deteriorated. By the 1980s the church was in a serious state of disrepair. Vandals had broken the few windows while the sometimes harsh Missouri weather had badly damaged the roof and foundation. Despite its poor condition, the building was added to the National Register of Historic Places largely due to the efforts of historian and former Pennytown resident Josephine Robinson Lawrence. Funds for repair and renovation were raised from locally and from across the U.S. by sales of a Pennytown cookbook, raffles, and bake sales, with $18,000 collected by 1994. This was used to help match a Historic Preservation Fund grant from the Missouri Department of Natural Resources in early 1995. By 1996 the restoration activity was largely complete. A new foundation was constructed, new windows and doors added, the original tile blocks reconstructed, a new roof added, and the interior was refurbished with painting, drywall, and a new wood plank floor.

The building is maintained today by a volunteer organization, Friends of Pennytown Historic Site. An annual reunion, or Homecoming, of former residents and their descendants is held the first weekend of August. The Homecoming tradition started shortly after the end World War II as the former residents, now scattered all across the Midwest and nation, longed to stay connected to their roots. Adjacent to the church, but no longer part of the property or the historic site, is a natural pond that was used for baptisms during the active years of the church. A large pole-mounted sign on the property explains the history of the community and the church.
