= First Presbyterian Church (Marshall, Missouri) =

Historic church in Missouri, United States

- U.S. National Register of Historic Places
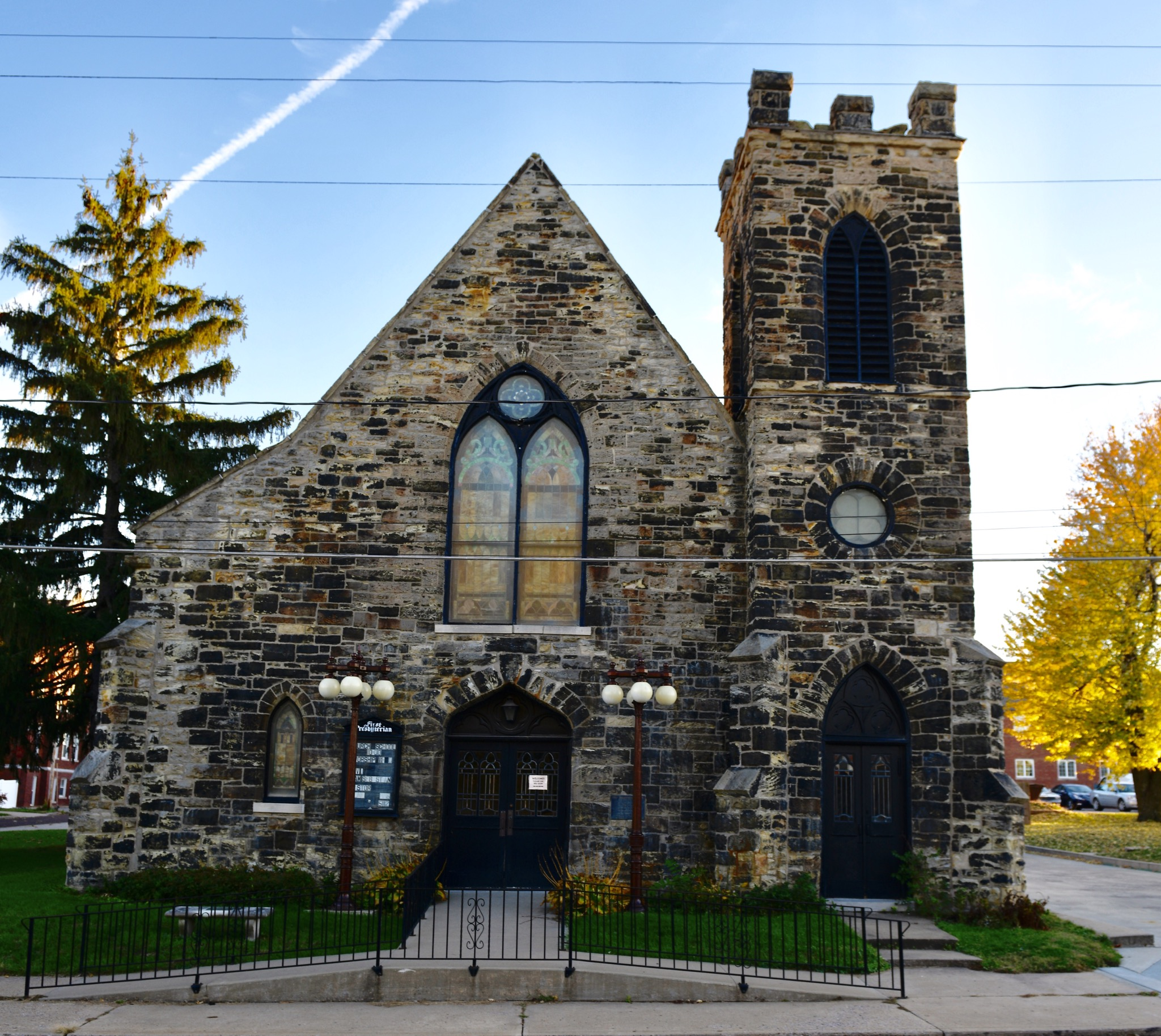

- Location within Missouri Location within the United States
- Location: 212 E. North St. Marshall, Missouri
- Coordinates: 39°7′15″N 93°11′39″W
- Area: less than one acre
- Built: 1871–1873
- Architect: Maurice & Dickinson
- Architectural style: Gothic Revival, Early Gothic Revival
- NRHP reference No.: 77000814
- Added to NRHP: September 20, 1977

First Presbyterian Church, also known as Rock Church, is a historic Presbyterian church located at 212 E. North Street in Marshall, Saline County, Missouri, United States. It was built between 1871 and 1873, and is a one-story Gothic Revival style yellow sandstone building. It features pointed arch windows and a corner bell tower.

It was added to the National Register of Historic Places in 1977.
