= List of Missouri Western Griffons head football coaches =

The Missouri Western Griffons football program is a college football team that represents Missouri Western State University. The team has had 7 head coaches since organized football began in 1970. The Griffons have played in almost than 500 games in its 45 seasons. In those seasons, one coaches have led the Griffons to postseason play: Jerry Partridge. Partridge is also the only coach to have won conference championships with the Griffons. Partridge is the all-time leader in games coached, years coached, and winning percentage. Harold Coagle is, in terms of winning percentage, the least successful coach the Griffons have had as he has a .276 winning percentage.

== Key ==
Key to symbols in coaches list
General		Overall		Conference		Postseason (Note: Although the first Rose Bowl Game was played in 1902, it has been continuously played since the 1916 game, and is recognized as the oldest bowl game by the NCAA. "—" indicates any season prior to 1916 when postseason games were not played.)	
No.	Order of coaches (Note: A running total of the number of head coaches, with coaches who served separate tenures being counted only once. Interim head coaches are represented with "Int" and are not counted in the running total. "—" indicates the team played but either without a coach or no coach is on record. "X" indicates an interim year without play.)	GC	Games coached	CW	Conference wins	PW	Postseason wins
DC	Division championships	OW	Overall wins	CL	Conference losses	PL	Postseason losses
CC	Conference championships	OL	Overall losses	CT	Conference ties	PT	Postseason ties
NC	National championships	OT	Overall ties (Note: Overtime rules in college football were introduced in 1996, making ties impossible in the period since.)	C%	Conference winning percentage		
†	Elected to the College Football Hall of Fame	O%	Overall winning percentage (Note: When computing the win–loss percentage, a tie counts as half a win and half a loss.)				

== Coaches ==
Statistics correct as of the end of the 2025 NCAA Division II football season

#	Name	Term	GC	OW	OL	OT	O%	CW	CL	CT	C%	PW	PL	PT	CCs	NCs	National awards
1	Harold Cagle	1970–1973	38	10	27	1	.276	—	—	—	—	—	—	—	—	—	—
2	Rob Hicklin	1974–1985	125	65	55	5	.540	31	31	0	.500	—	—	—	—	—	—
3	Dennis Darnell	1986–1990	54	19	34	1	.361	16	33	1	.330	—	—	—	—	—	—
4	Stan McGarvey	1991–1996	66	39	25	2	.606	29	24	2	.527	—	—	—	—	—	—
5	Jerry Partridge	1997–2016	232	149	83	—	.642	117	68	—	.632	4	6	—	2	—	—
6	Matt Williamson	2017–2022	48	31	26	—	.544	29	26	—	.257	2	0	—	0	—	—
7	Tyler Fenwick	2023–present	34	15	19	—	.441	11	17	—	.393	0	1	—	0	—	—
