= Blue Lick =

Blue Lick may refer to:

- Blue Lick, Indiana
- Blue Lick, Kentucky
- Blue Lick, Missouri

== See also ==
- Battle of Blue Licks
