= Mt. Carmel Historic District =

Historic district in Missouri, United States

- U.S. National Register of Historic Places
- U.S. Historic district
- Location within Missouri Location within the United States
- Location: 290th Rd. and Missouri Highway 41 North, near Marshall, Missouri
- Coordinates: 39°12′39″N 93°13′09″W
- Area: 166.9 acres (67.5 ha)
- Built by: Page, Edgar Rives; Page, Chastain Garland
- Architectural style: Gothic, Queen Anne
- NRHP reference No.: 09000900
- Added to NRHP: November 10, 2009

Mt. Carmel Historic District is a national historic district located near Marshall, Saline County, Missouri. The district encompasses two contributing buildings and two contributing sites near Marshall. The district consists of the Gothic Revival style Mt. Carmel Methodist Church (1893) (destroyed in a fire 2012), the church cemetery, the nearby Queen Anne style Brown-Dyer House (1891), and the surrounding farm acreage.

It was listed on the National Register of Historic Places in 2009.
