= Fitzgibbon Hospital =

- U.S. National Register of Historic Places
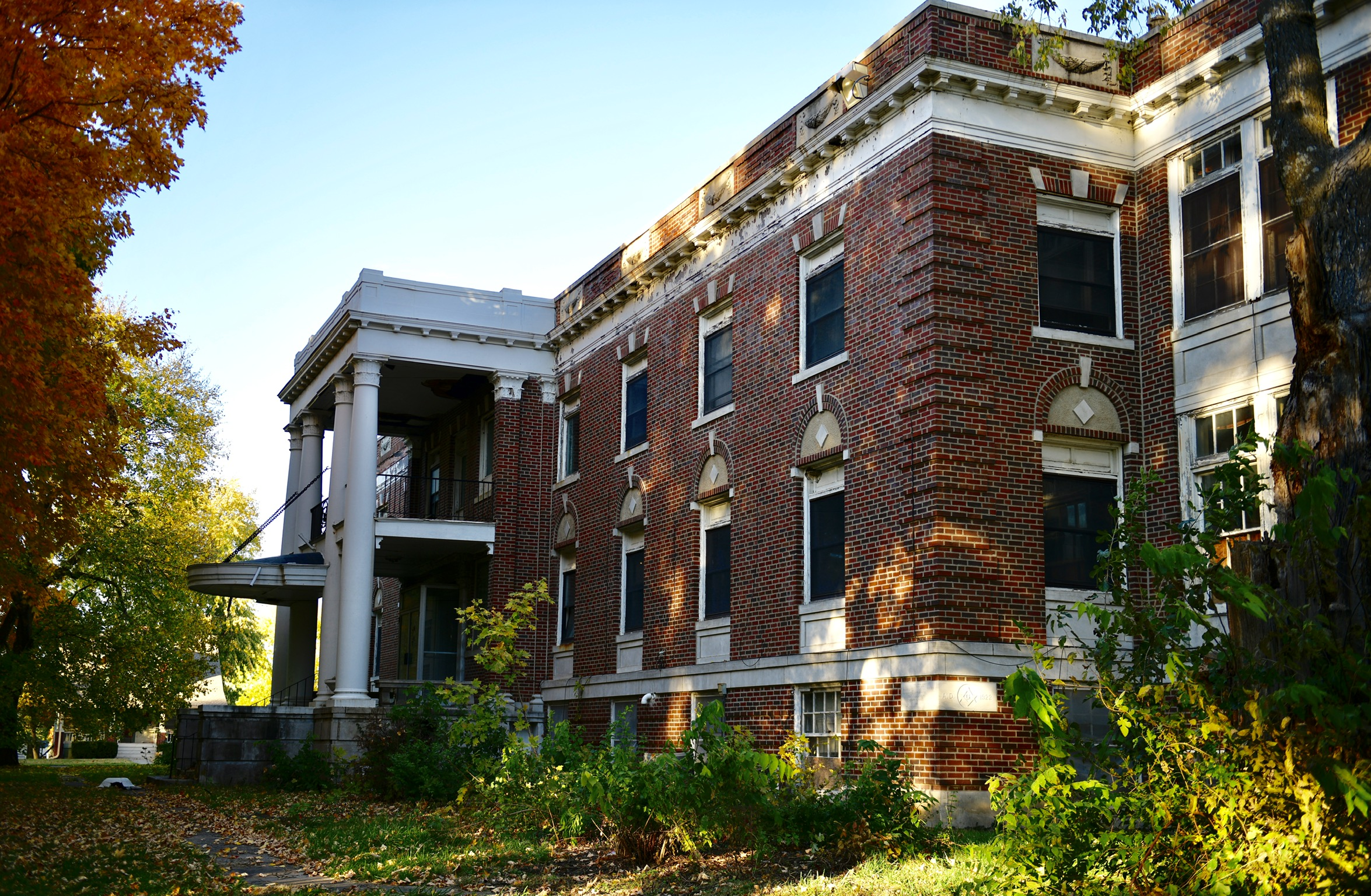

- Location within Missouri Location within the United States
- Location: 868 S. Brunswick Ave. Marshall, Missouri
- Coordinates: 39°6′44″N 93°11′25″W
- Area: 3.5 acres (1.4 ha)
- Built: 1923, 1955
- Built by: Pratt-Thompson Construction Company
- Architect: Shepard and Wiser; Gentry and Voskamp
- Architectural style: Classical Revival, Moderne
- NRHP reference No.: 12000874
- Added to NRHP: October 17, 2012

Fitzgibbon Hospital is a historic hospital building located at Marshall, Saline County, Missouri. The original two-story Classical Revival style section was built in 1923, with a five-story Modern Movement style addition constructed in 1955. The original rectangular brick section features a two-story projecting portico and limestone trim and decorative panels. The 1955 addition consists of irregularly massed blocks at different heights.

It was added to the National Register of Historic Places in 2012.

It was torn down in the early months of 2023.

In 2026, the hospital filed for Chapter 11 bankruptcy protection with plans to sell itself to health care advisory firms.
