= Knefler =

Knefler is a surname. Notable people with the surname include:

- Cynthelia Isgrig Knefler (1872–1942), American labor organizer, suffragist, social worker
- Frederick Knefler (1824–1901), American Union Army general
- Otto Knefler (1923–1986), German football player and manager

== See also ==
- Kneller
