= Rob Hicklin =

American football coach (1937–2006)

Biographical details
- Born: August 6, 1937; Nelson, Missouri, U.S.
- Died: September 22, 2006 (aged 69); Joplin, Missouri, U.S.
- Education: Missouri Valley

Coaching career (HC unless noted)
- 1959–1961: Lexington HS (MO) (assistant)
- 1962–1963: Ruskin HS (MO) (assistant)
- 1964–1968: Belton HS (MO)
- 1969–1973: William Penn (DC)
- 1974–1985: Missouri Western
- 1986–1989: Southern Arkansas

Head coaching record
- Overall: 78–79–7 (college)
- Bowls: 3–0

Robin Lee "Rob" Hicklin (August 6, 1937 – September 22, 2006) was an American football coach. He served as the head football coach at Missouri Western University in Saint Joseph, Missouri from 1974 to 1985 and Southern Arkansas University from 1986 to 1989.

== Head coaching record ==
=== College ===
Year	Team	Overall	Conference	Standing	Bowl/playoffs
Missouri Western Griffons (NAIA Division II independent) (1974–1975)
1974	Missouri Western	3–7			
1975	Missouri Western	8–3–1			W Mineral Water
Missouri Western Griffons (Central States Intercollegiate Conference) (1976–1985)
1976	Missouri Western	4–5	1–4	T–5th	
1977	Missouri Western	8–2–1	4–2–1	T–3rd	W Boot Hill
1978	Missouri Western	5–5	4–3	4th	
1979	Missouri Western	7–4	3–4	T–3rd	W Moila Shrine Classic
1980	Missouri Western	5–3–2	3–3–1	5th	
1981	Missouri Western	8–2	5–2	T–2nd	
1982	Missouri Western	5–5	3–4	5th	
1983	Missouri Western	5–6	3–4	6th	
1984	Missouri Western	4–6–1	4–3	T–4th	
1985	Missouri Western	3–7	2–5	T–7th	
Missouri Western:		65–55–5	32–34–1		
Southern Arkansas Muleriders (Arkansas Intercollegiate Conference) (1986–1989)
1986	Southern Arkansas	4–7	2–5	7th	
1987	Southern Arkansas	5–4–1	3–2–1	2nd	
1988	Southern Arkansas	1–9	1–5	T–6th	
1989	Southern Arkansas	3–6–1	1–5	T–6th	
Southern Arkansas:		13–24–2	7–17–1		
Total:		78–79–7			
