= Pennytown, Missouri =

Extinct hamlet in Missouri, U.S.

Coordinates: 39°00′N 93°10′W

Pennytown is an unincorporated area in Saline County, Missouri, United States. Historically, it was the largest African-American community in central Missouri.

Joe Penny, a former slave from Kentucky, started what would become Pennytown in March 1871 when he purchased eight acres of land for $160. Ten more purchases by black families followed during the 1870s and by 1880, black farmers owned more than one-third of the land in the Salt Fork Township. Historically, its population consisted of former slaves and their descendants. Pennytown's peak population was 1,000. The final birth in the community occurred in 1944. Around that period, due to lowering economic prospects, many families began to move to Marshall. As time passed, more and more buildings were razed. As of 2014, the only remaining building from the former settlement is the Free Will Baptist Church of Pennytown.
