= Pierre Fleche Creek =

Stream in Saline County, Missouri, U.S.

Coordinates: 39.1247475°N 92.9457471°W

Pierre Fleche Creek is a stream in Saline County in the U.S. state of Missouri. It is a tributary of the Missouri River.

Pierre Fleche Creek is a French name meaning roughly "Arrow Rock Creek".

== See also ==
- List of rivers of Missouri
