= Orearville, Missouri =

Unincorporated community in Missouri, U.S.

Coordinates: 39°10′18″N 93°04′28″W

Orearville is an unincorporated community in Saline County, in the U.S. state of Missouri.

== History ==
A post office called Orearville was established in 1875, and remained in operation until 1903. The community has the name of the local Orear family.
