= Doc Quigg =

American journalist

H.D. "Doc" Quigg (né Horace Dasher Quigg Jr.; November 22, 1911 – May 12, 1998) was an American journalist.

== Life ==
Horace Dasher Quigg Jr., was born in Marshall, Missouri to parents Horace Dasher Quigg Sr., and M. Elizabeth Craig Quigg. The family moved to Boonville, Missouri, in 1914, where Quigg Sr., was a physician, civic leader, and mayor. Quigg's nickname, "Doc", originally started as "Young Doc Quigg", in reference to his father's position. In later life, Quigg chose to go exclusively by his initials or nickname. Quigg Jr., completed A.B. and B.J. degrees at the University of Missouri in 1934 and started his journalism career at the Boonville Daily News. In 1936, he began working for United Press in Cleveland, Ohio and transferred to New York City in 1937.

Quigg spent the remainder of his career at UP and its successor, UPI, and covered a variety of subjects. During World War II, he covered the Pacific Theatre and General Douglas MacArthur's return to the Philippines. In 1947, he traveled to Antarctica with Admiral Richard E. Byrd's expedition. Other coverage assignments included politicians, actors and celebrities, Pope Pius XXII, the Moon landing, court cases, and a nudist convention. Quigg was named senior editor at UPI in 1967.

Quigg retired in 1985 and was awarded a Society of Silurians award for distinguished reporting and the University of Missouri's Honor Medal for distinguished service in journalism. Quigg died in New York City of heart disease. He is buried in Boonville.
