= Ridge Prairie, Missouri =

Unincorporated community in Missouri, US

Coordinates: 38°57′20″N 93°04′06″W

Ridge Prairie is an unincorporated community in Saline County, in the U.S. state of Missouri.

== History ==
A post office called Ridge Prairie was established in 1846, and remained in operation until 1907. The community was named for a prairie near the original town site.
