= Sharon, Missouri =

Unincorporated community in Missouri, U.S.

Coordinates: 39°18′02″N 93°08′00″W

Sharon is an unincorporated community in Saline County, in the U.S. state of Missouri.

== History ==
A post office called Sharon was established in 1888, and remained in operation until 1903. The community had the Sharon schoolhouse, now defunct.
