= Charles W. Gehrke =

American chemist (1917–2009)

Charles W. Gehrke (18 July 1917 in New York City, New York – 10 February 2009 in Columbia, Missouri) was an American chemist, researcher and business entrepreneur.

== Biography and career ==
Gehrke was born in New York City to a German immigrant mother (Louise Mader Gehrke) and a laborer father (Heinrich Gehrke). The family moved to Ohio when Charles was young. His father suffered from alcohol abuse, and when Charles was 10 years old, local police put the father on a train and told him that he would face jail for physically abusing his family if he ever returned. Left with five small children, the mother took cleaning jobs in the nearby town (Coshocton), and the two older boys (Hank, born 1916 and Charles) worked as much as possible as field hands, often taking care of their infant brother as they worked.

Gehrke received a B.A. degree (1939), a B.S. degree in Education (1941) and an M.S. degree in Bacteriology (1941) from Ohio State University.

Gehrke served as professor of Chemistry and "chairman of the Chemistry Department" (he provided the title to a biographer in 2008, then explained that he was the only member of the department) at Missouri Valley College, whose students were largely junior officers in the United States Navy (1941–1945). When World War II wound down he returned to OSU, instructing in Agricultural Biochemistry and working on a Ph.D. He received the degree in 1947. He joined the University of Missouri's Agriculture Department (1949) and remained there until retiring (1987). At his retirement he held the titles "Professor of Biochemistry", "manager of the Experiment Station Chemical Laboratories", and "director of University Interdisciplinary Chromatography-Mass Spectrometry facility." After retiring, Gehrke served as scientific coordinator for the Cancer Research Center in Columbia (1987-1989).

While still at MU Gehrke co-founded (with David Stalling and Jim Ussary) a company devoted to development and manufacture of chromatography instruments, Analytical Bio-Chemistry Laboratories Inc. (ABC Labs) based in Columbia, Missouri. In 2015, ABC Labs was bought out by EAG Laboratories, and in 2017, the firm was purchased by Eurofins. The company presently provides pharmaceutical and environmental services, and employs more than 300 people.

Gehrke met future wife Virginia Horcher at OSU. They married Christmas Day (25 December) 1941 at Zanesville, Ohio, and she died on their anniversary day 65 years later (2006). They had three children, two of whom survived their parents.

Gehrke published 270 peer-reviewed articles and authored or edited 9 books. He was working on another two books at his death which were set to be published in summer and fall 2009.

Gehrke's group developed a GC method of analyzing amino acids in biological samples.

He was asked by NASA to analyze some of the Moon rocks returned by the Project Apollo missions in the 1970s, to identify any traces of extraterrestrial life. Gehrke was chosen because of his extensive experience in the field of amino acids. The instrument that his group used to examine the lunar materials is now housed in the Smithsonian Museum's National Air and Space Museum. Gehrke provided this service to NASA (along with one other researcher) from 1969 to 1974. Gehrke never lost his fascination with extraterrestrial biology; he was active in organizing conferences and working with researchers on space explorations and the future of humankind in space until he was over 80 years old. His burial is at Memorial Park Cemetery in Columbia, Missouri.

A book outlining his life, From the Melon Fields to Moon Rocks, was published in March 2017.

== Awards and honors ==
- The Charles W. Gehrke Proteomics Center at the University of Missouri at Columbia was named in honor of Professor Gehrke.
- received the Harvey W. Wiley Award from the Association of Official Analytical Chemists (1971)
- elected President of the Association of Official Analytical Chemists (1982)
- received the M.S. Tswett Chromatography Memorial Medal Award from the Soviet Academy of Sciences
- received the International Dal Nogare Chromatography Award
- received the Ohio State University Alumni Professional Achievement Award
- received the University of Missouri Senior Faculty Research Award
- received the National American Chemical Society Spencer Award
- member of the American Chemical Society since 1943
- received the 2000 Chromatography Award from the American Chemical Society
