= Hannah Hennessy =

American labor organizer (1882-1910)

- Hennessy, from a 1909 publication
- Born: October 23, 1882; Ohio, U.S.
- Died: November 24, 1910 (aged 28); Saint Louis, Missouri, U.S.
- Occupation: Labor organizer

Hannah Hennessy (October 23, 1882 – November 24, 1910) was an American labor organizer. She was the first woman elected to the executive council of the Central Trades and Labor Union of Saint Louis. In 1908, she and Cynthelia Isgrig Knefler founded the Women's Trade Union League of Saint Louis.

== Early life and education ==
Hennessy was born in Ohio, the eldest child of eight born to Richard W. Hennessy and Caroline Kuhlmann Hennessy. She began working in the garment industry at age 13.

== Career ==
Hennessy was financial secretary of the Garment Workers' Union No. 57. She was a delegate to the national conventions of the Women's Trade Union League and the American Federation of Labor. She was elected as a trustee of the Central Trades and Labor Union in 1907, becoming the first woman to serve on the CTLU's executive council. In 1908, she and Cynthelia Isgrig Knefler founded the Women's Trade Union League of Saint Louis, and she served as the league's secretary and treasurer. They developed the bill for a nine-hour day and six-day week for women workers in Missouri.

== Personal life ==
Hennessy died from tuberculosis in 1910, at the age of 28, in Saint Louis. National publications pointed to Hennessy as a casualty in the work of organizing labor. "Undoubtedly Hannah Hennessy's life was shortened by her devotion to the cause of Trade Unionism," wrote Knefler, observing that her working conditions in the garment industry and her experience as a striker were detrimental to Hennessy's health. Her close friend Anna Egan died about a week later, from typhoid fever; they had been called "inseparables" and "were always to be found in each other's society."
