= Robert K. Enders =

American zoologist (1899–1988)

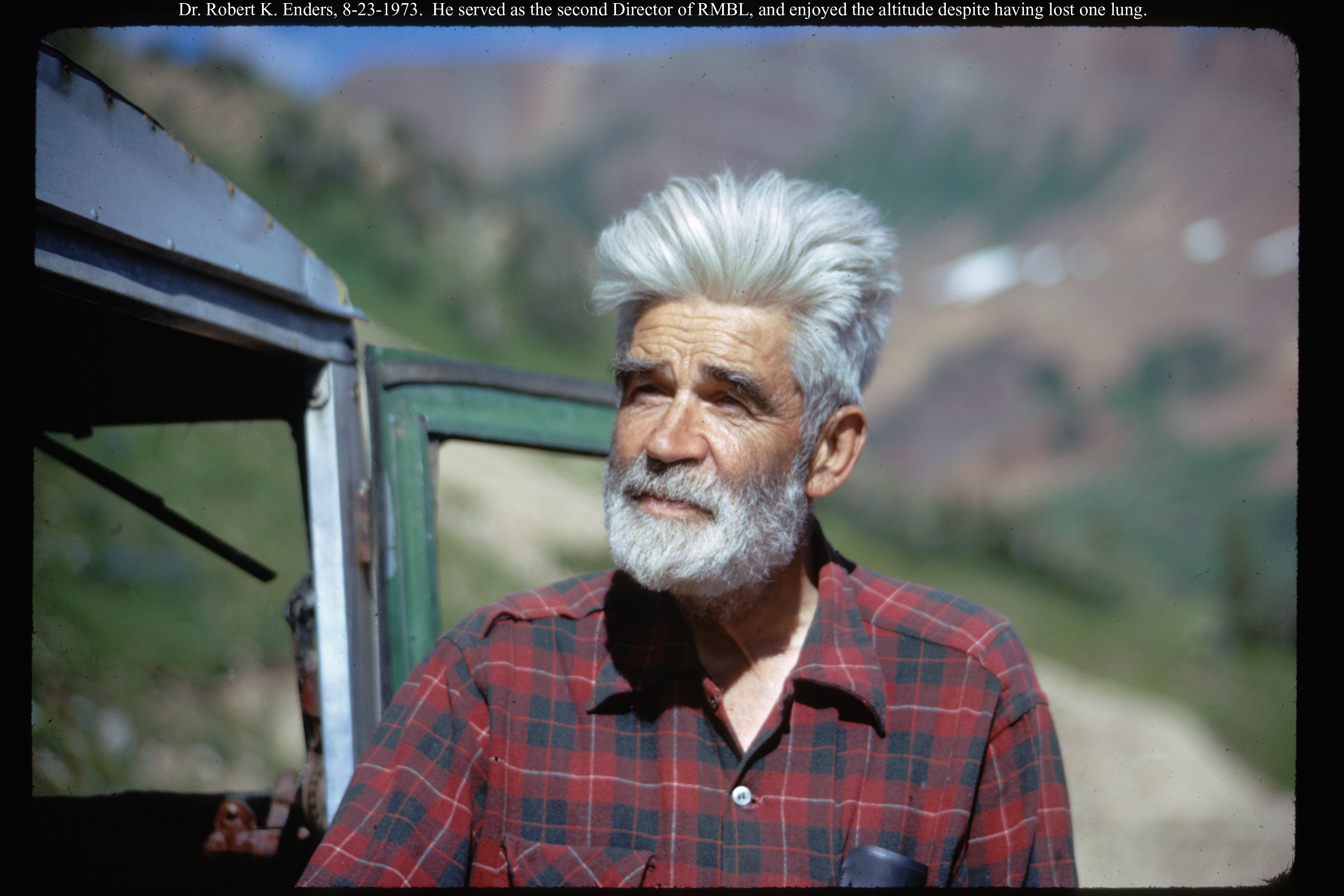
- Enders in 1973
- Born: Robert Kendall Enders; September 22, 1899; Essex, Iowa
- Died: January 25, 1988 (aged 88); Swarthmore, Pennsylvania
- Education: University of Michigan
- Scientific career
- Fields: Zoology
- Workplaces: Union College; Missouri Valley College; Academy of Natural Sciences; Swarthmore College

Robert Kendall Enders (September 22, 1899 – January 25, 1988) was an American zoologist.

Born in the small Iowa city of Essex, Enders attended the University of Michigan where he majored in zoology, earning an A.B. in 1925 and a Ph.D. in 1927. His first posting was as assistant professor of biology at Union College and, the following year, at Missouri Valley College. In 1932, Dr. Enders joined the Swarthmore College faculty as an assistant professor and became chairman of the biology department in 1946. He retired in 1970. During 1932 year he visited Barro Colorado Island, where he had his research station in the Panama Canal Zone. He then visited the island again as a member of the Academy of Natural Sciences of Philadelphia. After that, he continued to visit the research station periodically. He was an Emeritus Professor of Zoology at Swarthmore College in 1966 as well. Dr. Enders served as director of the Rocky Mountain Biological Laboratory in Gothic, Colorado, during the summers of 1958 through 1969.

Robert K. Enders died in Swarthmore at the age of 88. He and his wife Abbie were the parents of a daughter, Gertrude, and a son, Allen.
