= Herndon, Missouri =

Unincorporated community in Missouri, U.S.

Coordinates: 39°00′15″N 93°16′13″W

Herndon is an unincorporated community in Saline County, in the U.S. state of Missouri.

== History ==
Herndon was platted in 1874, and named after Edward S. Herndon, an early settler. A post office called Herndon was established in 1873, and remained in operation until 1907.
