= Salt Springs, Missouri =

Unincorporated community in the US state of Missouri

Coordinates: 39°06′44″N 93°20′51″W

Salt Springs is an unincorporated community in Saline County, in the U.S. state of Missouri.

== History ==
A post office called Salt Springs was established in 1875, and remained in operation until 1907. The community was so named on account of brine springs near the original town site.
