= Saline County Courthouse (Missouri) =

Historic courthouse in Marshall, Missouri, United States

- U.S. National Register of Historic Places
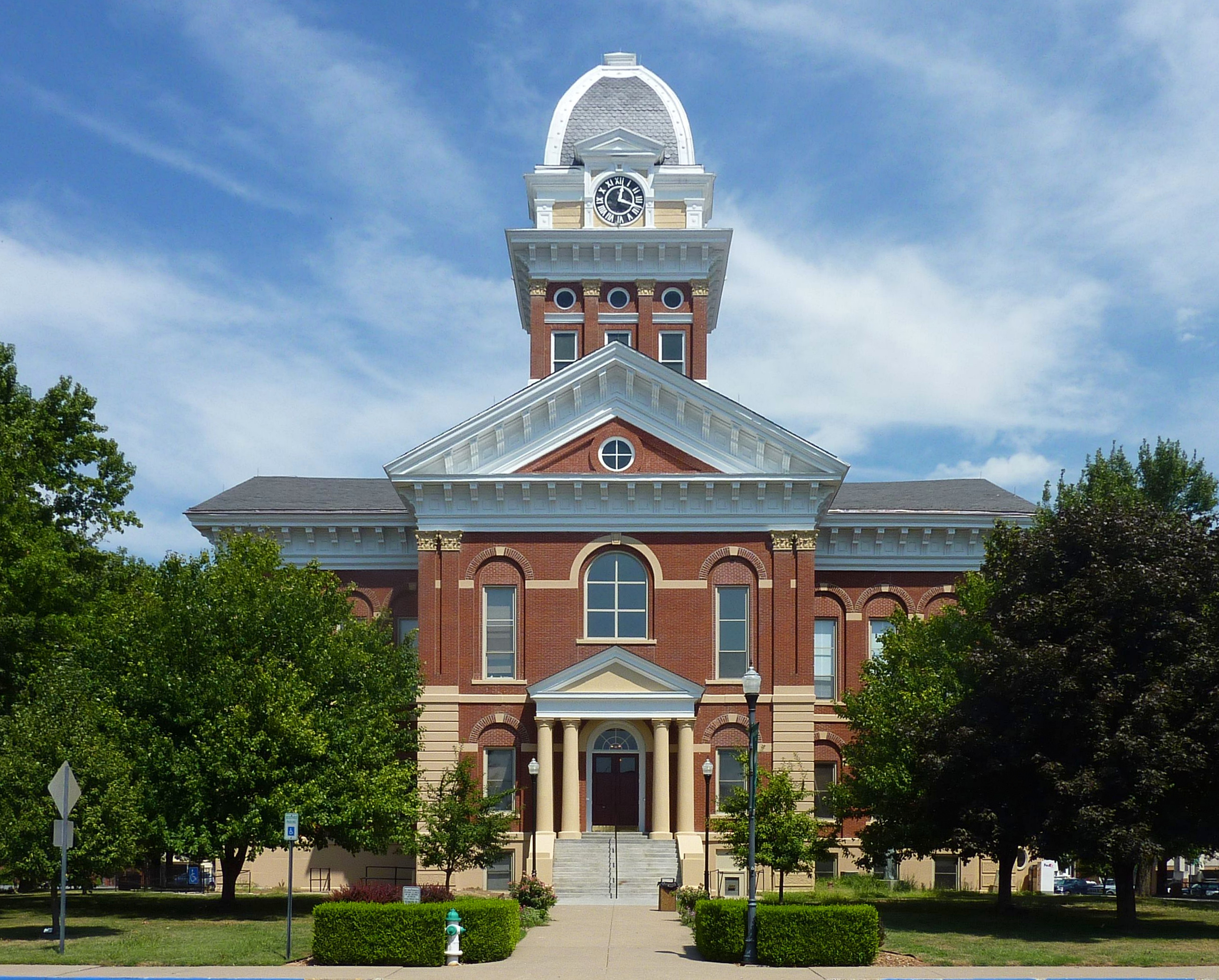
- Saline County Courthouse, August 2010

- Location within Missouri Location within the United States
- Location: Courthouse Sq., Marshall, Missouri
- Coordinates: 39°7′15″N 93°11′47″W
- Area: 1.7 acres (0.69 ha)
- Built: 1882-1883
- Architect: John C. Cochrane; J. Volke,
- NRHP reference No.: 77000815
- Added to NRHP: August 24, 1977

Saline County Courthouse is a historic courthouse in Marshall, Missouri, United States, this is listed on the National Register of Historic Places (NRHP).

== Description ==
The courthouse was designed by John C. Cochrane and built in 1882–1883. It is a two-story, cruciform plan, red brick building and measures 100 by 110 feet (30 m × 34 m). It features a four-stage, square clock tower with a pyramidal slate roof atop the intersecting wings.

It was added to the NRHP in 1977.

== See also ==
- National Register of Historic Places listings in Saline County, Missouri
