= McAllister Springs, Missouri =

Unincorporated community in Missouri, U.S.

Coordinates: 38°56′50″N 93°21′06″W

McAllister Springs is an unincorporated community in Saline County, in the U.S. state of Missouri.

== History ==
A variant name was "McAllister". A post office called McAllister was established in 1881, and remained in operation until 1907. The nearby springs bear the name of one Mr. McAllister, the original owner of the site.
