= Gilliam, Missouri =

- City
- Location of Gilliam, Missouri
- Coordinates: 39°13′58″N 93°00′15″W
- Country: United States
- State: Missouri
- County: Saline
- Incorporated: 1899

Area
  - Total: 0.25 sq mi (0.64 km^{2})
  - Land: 0.25 sq mi (0.64 km^{2})
  - Water: 0 sq mi (0.00 km^{2})
- Elevation: 820 ft (250 m)

Population (2020)
  - Total: 175
  - Density: 704.5/sq mi (271.99/km^{2})
- Time zone: UTC-6 (Central (CST))
  - Summer (DST): UTC-5 (CDT)
- ZIP code: 65330
- Area code: 660
- FIPS code: 29-27028
- GNIS feature ID: 2396960

Gilliam is a city in Saline County, Missouri, United States. As of the 2020 census, Gilliam had a population of 175.

== History ==
Gilliam was platted in 1878. The community was named after a local farmer and landowner, W. T. Gilliam. And his brother Fayette Henry Gilliam. The Gilliam has been in operation since 1879.

== Geography ==
According to the United States Census Bureau, the city has a total area of 0.25 square miles (0.65 km^{2}), all land.

== Demographics ==
Historical population
Census	Pop.	Note	%±
1880	56		—
1890	321		473.2%
1900	347		8.1%
1910	299		−13.8%
1920	404		35.1%
1930	404		0.0%
1940	308		−23.8%
1950	306		−0.6%
1960	249		−18.6%
1970	248		−0.4%
1980	227		−8.5%
1990	212		−6.6%
2000	229		8.0%
2010	197		−14.0%
2020	175		−11.2%
U.S. Decennial Census

=== 2010 census ===
As of the census of 2010, there were 197 people, 87 households, and 46 families living in the city. The population density was 788.0 inhabitants per square mile (304.2/km^{2}). There were 101 housing units at an average density of 404.0 per square mile (156.0/km^{2}). The racial makeup of the city was 95.9% White, 3.0% African American, 0.5% Native American, and 0.5% from two or more races. Hispanic or Latino of any race were 0.5% of the population.

There were 87 households, of which 28.7% had children under the age of 18 living with them, 39.1% were married couples living together, 9.2% had a female householder with no husband present, 4.6% had a male householder with no wife present, and 47.1% were non-families. 41.4% of all households were made up of individuals, and 11.4% had someone living alone who was 65 years of age or older. The average household size was 2.26 and the average family size was 3.09.

The median age in the city was 34.3 years. 26.4% of residents were under the age of 18; 9.1% were between the ages of 18 and 24; 23.3% were from 25 to 44; 30.6% were from 45 to 64; and 10.7% were 65 years of age or older. The gender makeup of the city was 54.8% male and 45.2% female.

=== 2000 census ===
As of the census of 2000, there were 229 people, 103 households, and 55 families living in the town. The population density was 915.0 inhabitants per square mile (353.3/km^{2}). There were 118 housing units at an average density of 471.5 per square mile (182.0/km^{2}). The racial makeup of the town was 94.32% White, 3.93% African American, 0.44% Asian, and 1.31% from two or more races.

There were 103 households, out of which 26.2% had children under the age of 18 living with them, 36.9% were married couples living together, 13.6% had a female householder with no husband present, and 46.6% were non-families. 40.8% of all households were made up of individuals, and 23.3% had someone living alone who was 65 years of age or older. The average household size was 2.22 and the average family size was 3.05.

In the town the population was spread out, with 26.6% under the age of 18, 5.7% from 18 to 24, 26.6% from 25 to 44, 17.5% from 45 to 64, and 23.6% who were 65 years of age or older. The median age was 40 years. For every 100 females there were 90.8 males. For every 100 females age 18 and over, there were 86.7 males.

The median income for a household in the town was $27,813, and the median income for a family was $31,250. Males had a median income of $25,938 versus $13,864 for females. The per capita income for the town was $12,120. About 16.7% of families and 17.3% of the population were below the poverty line, including 23.5% of those under the age of eighteen and 15.9% of those 65 or over.

== Education ==
It is in the Gilliam C-4 School District.
