= Saline City, Missouri =

Unincorporated community in Missouri, U.S.

Coordinates: 39°08′25″N 92°56′36″W

Saline City is an unincorporated community in Saline County, in the U.S. state of Missouri.

Buzzard Branch, Fish Creek and Pierre Fleche Creek flow nearby.

== History ==
Saline City was laid out in 1858, and named after the county in which it is located. A variant name was "Littlerock". A post office called Saline City was established in 1869, and closed in 1870, and a post office called Little Rock was in operation from 1878 until 1907.
