= Jim the Wonder Dog =

American dog (1925–1937)

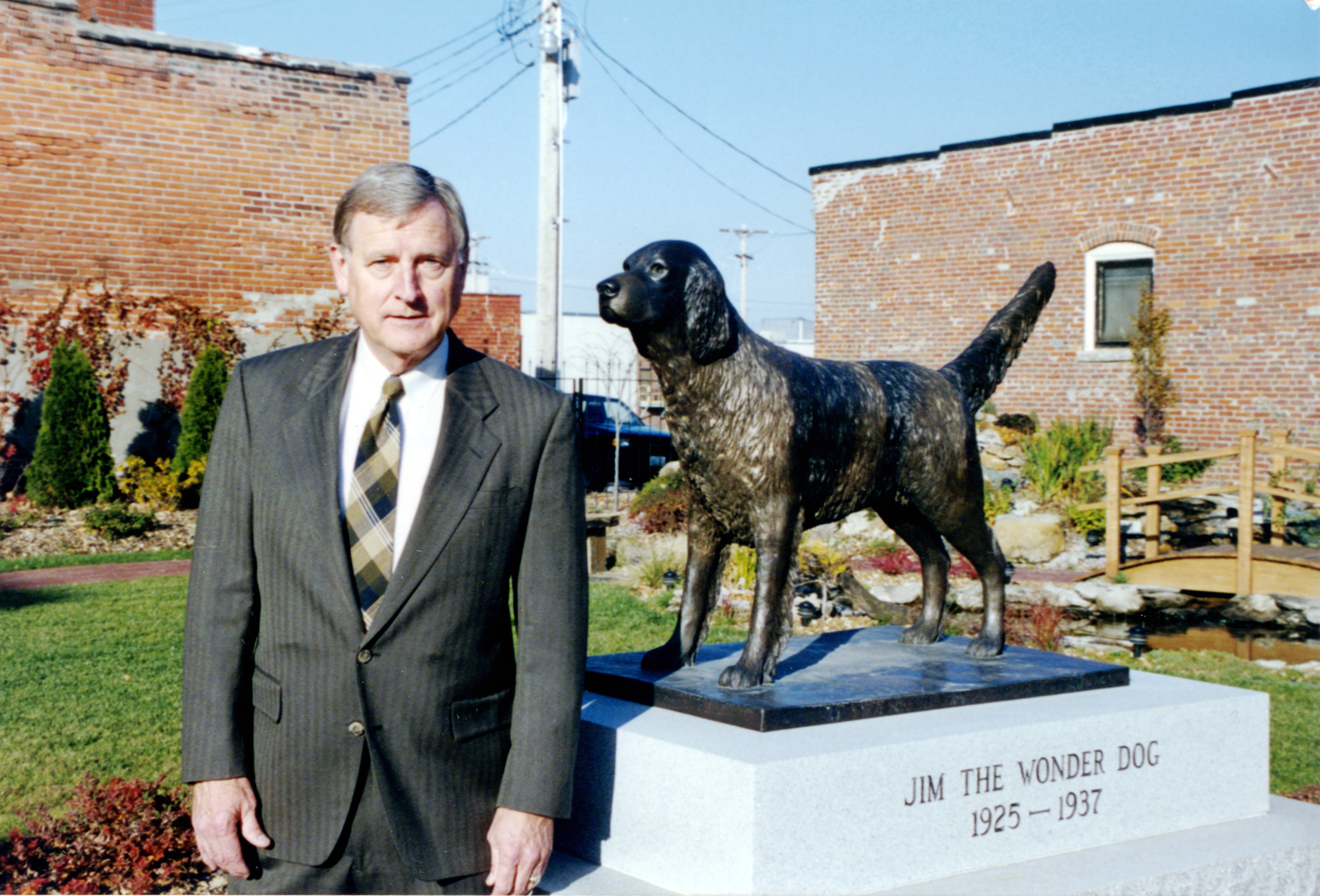
- Mel Carnahan and a statue of Jim the Wonder Dog in 1999
- Species: Dog
- Breed: Llewellin Setter
- Born: 1925; Louisiana, US
- Died: March 18, 1937 (aged 12); Marshall, Missouri, US
- Known for: Alleged clairvoyant abilities

Jim the Wonder Dog (1925 – March 18, 1937) was an American male Llewellin Setter (Note: 'Llewellin Setter' is a name sometimes used to describe a specific strain of working English Setter.) alleged to have clairvoyant abilities. He originally came from Louisiana and reportedly could predict the sex of unborn babies, as well as the winner of the Kentucky Derby.

== Life ==
Jim, born 1925, earned his reputation as a 'wonder dog' during the 1930s, puzzling psychologists from both Washington University in St. Louis and University of Missouri in Columbia. Dr. A. J. Durant, director of the School of Veterinary Medicine, tested Jim's abilities in a public demonstration. He concluded that Jim "possessed an occult power that might never come again to a dog in many generations". Jim seemed to have the ability to guess the sex of an unborn baby and answer to orders in many languages even though his owner, Sam Van Arsdale, only spoke English. Jim the Wonder Dog picked the winner of the Kentucky Derby seven years in a row. He also predicted the Yankee victory in the 1936 World Series. A joint session of the Missouri Legislature was called in order to witness the talents of Jim. He died March 18, 1937, at the age of 12. Sam was devastated and the entire town was stunned by the loss.

== Memorial Park ==
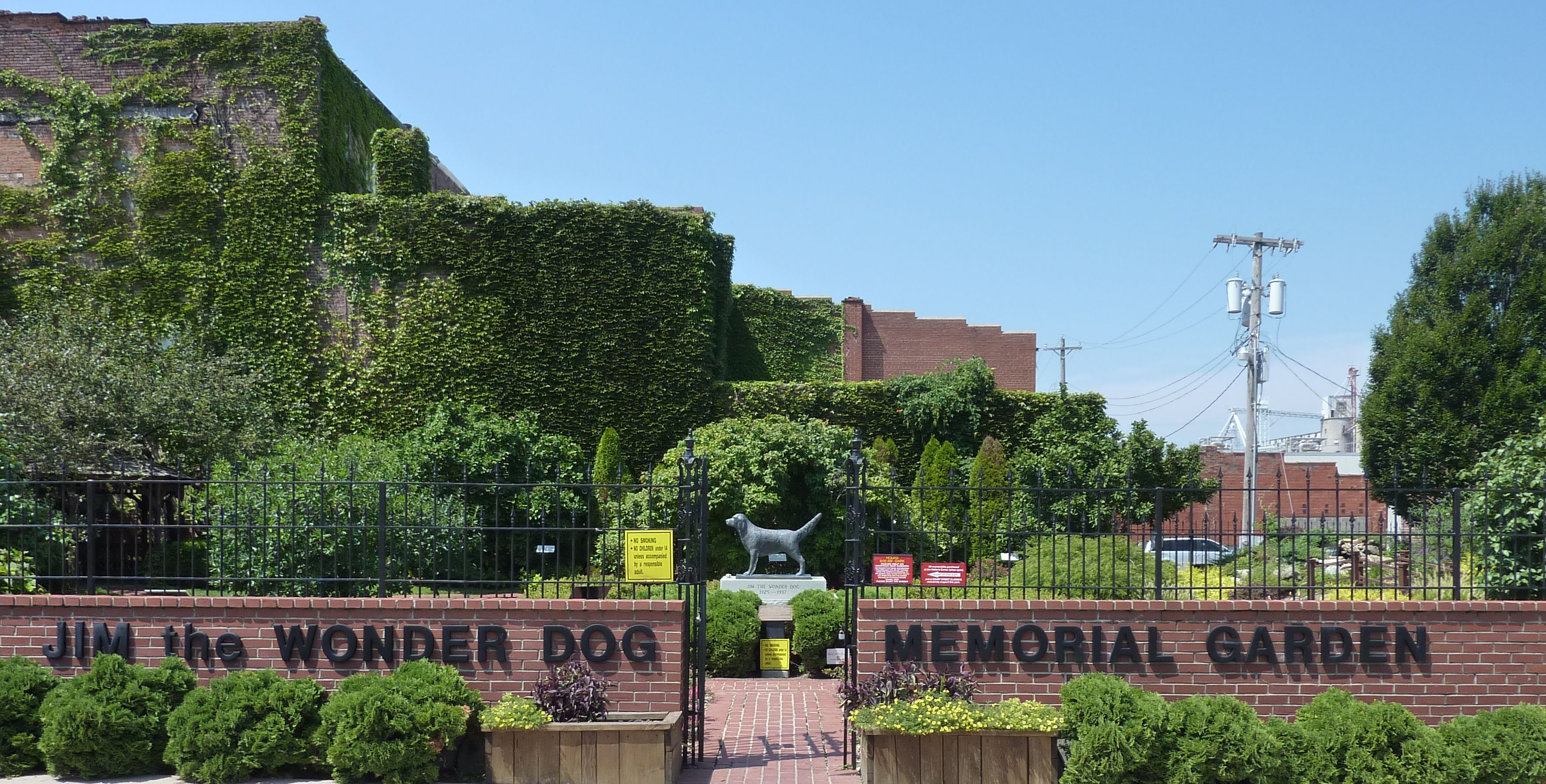
Jim the Wonder Dog Memorial Garden on the square in Marshall

In 1999, a park in Marshall, Missouri, where he died, was built in his honor. The park was opened May 1, 1999, where a statue of Jim was unveiled. Andy Davis, a Columbia sculptor, was commissioned to create the likeness of Jim out of bronze. The park is located on the former location of Sam Van Arsdale's hotel. The Saline County Water Garden Club designed and constructed the water feature within the park.

== See also ==
- Clever Hans
- Observer-expectancy effect
- List of individual dogs
