= Baity Hall =

- U.S. National Register of Historic Places
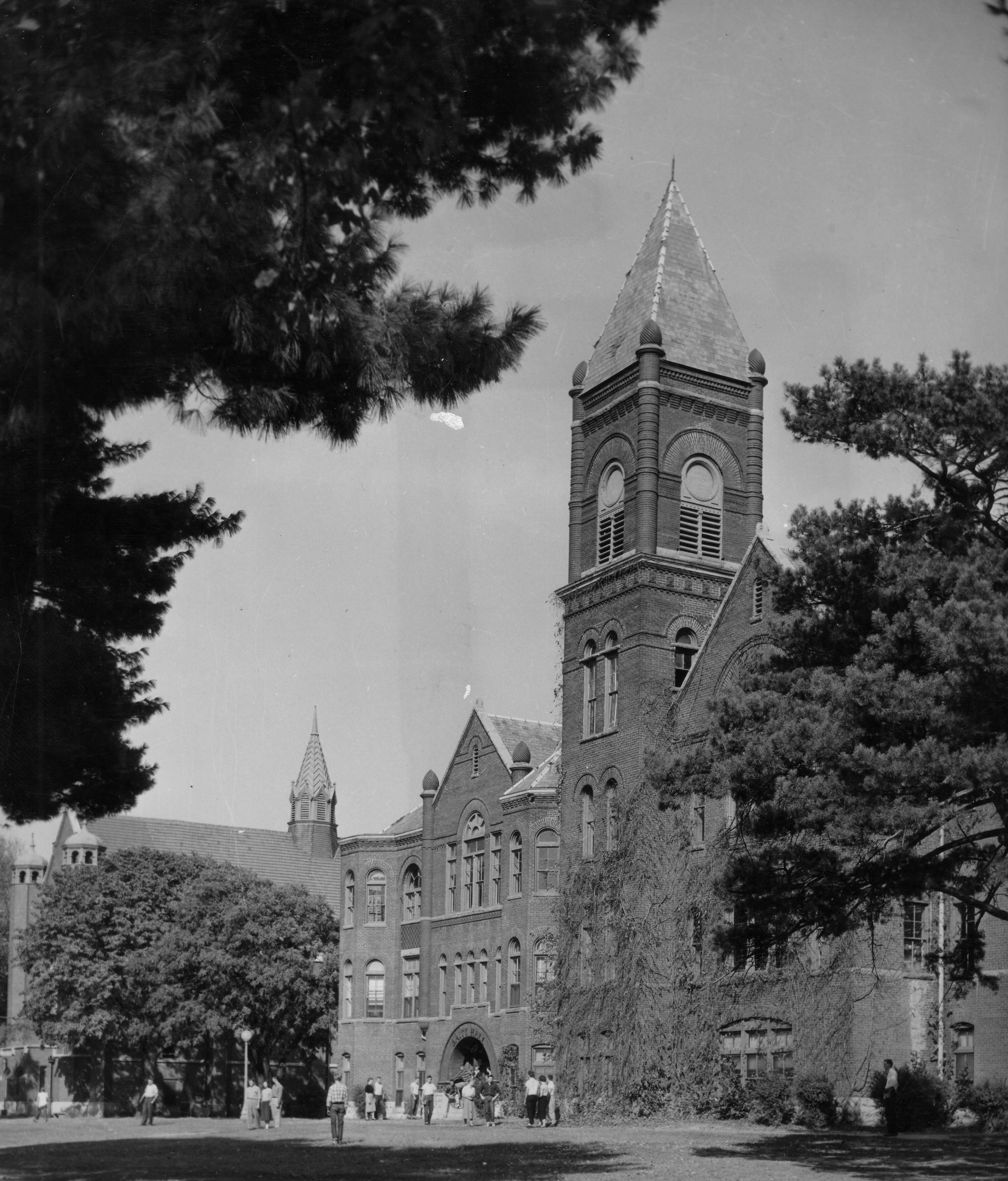

- Location within Missouri Location within the United States
- Location: Missouri Valley College, 500 E. College, Marshall, Missouri
- Coordinates: 39°6′28″N 93°11′23″W
- Area: 0.6 acres (0.24 ha)
- Built: 1889
- Built by: Edgar R. Page
- Architect: Charles E. Illsley
- Architectural style: High Victorian Romanesque
- NRHP reference No.: 86001396
- Added to NRHP: June 25, 1986

Baity Hall is a historic building at Missouri Valley College, 500 E. College in Marshall, Missouri.

The building was constructed in 1889 in a high Victorian and Romanesque style. The building is notable for its beautiful wooden staircase, vaulted wooden ceilings, and stained glass windows. Baity Hall was added to the National Register of Historic Places in 1986.

The building was designed by Charles E. Illsley, St. Louis architect, and built by Edgar R. Page, Marshall contractor.

Called "Old Main" until 1948, when it was renamed to honor Reverend George P. Baity, it served as the only building on the Missouri Valley College campus for six years. During that time it served every purpose, providing the space for classrooms, offices, laboratories, dormitories, a museum, kitchen, cafeteria, chapel, library, conference rooms, and two gymnasiums for men and women. Some modifications have been made to the original building such as the removal of the upper portion of the bell tower in 1959. Today, Baity hall continues to serve as classroom and office space for faculty and administration of Missouri Valley College. The former chapel has been converted into the Learning Center which serves as a study, test taking and tutoring area for students.

== Gallery ==
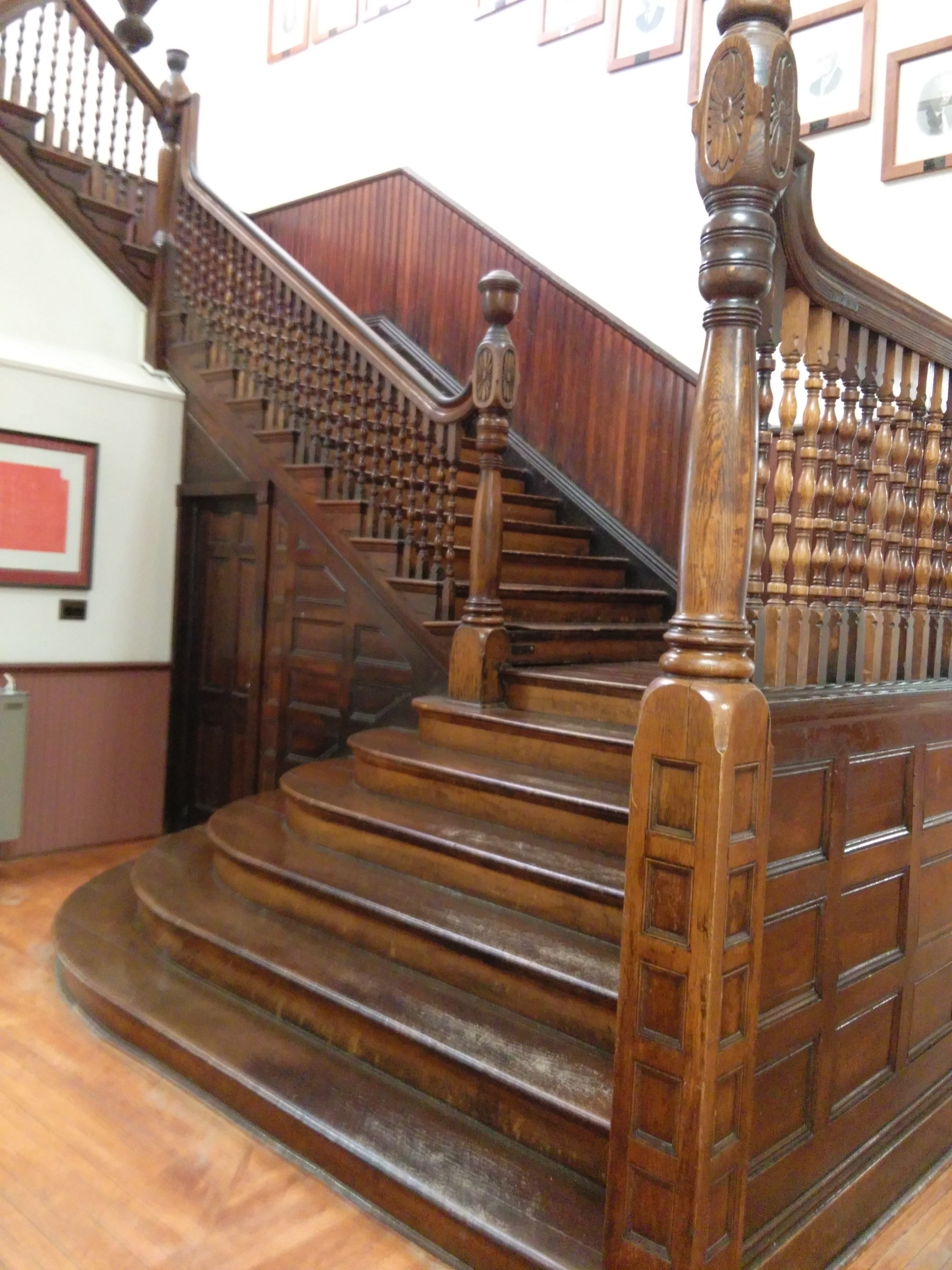
Main staircase in Baity Hall

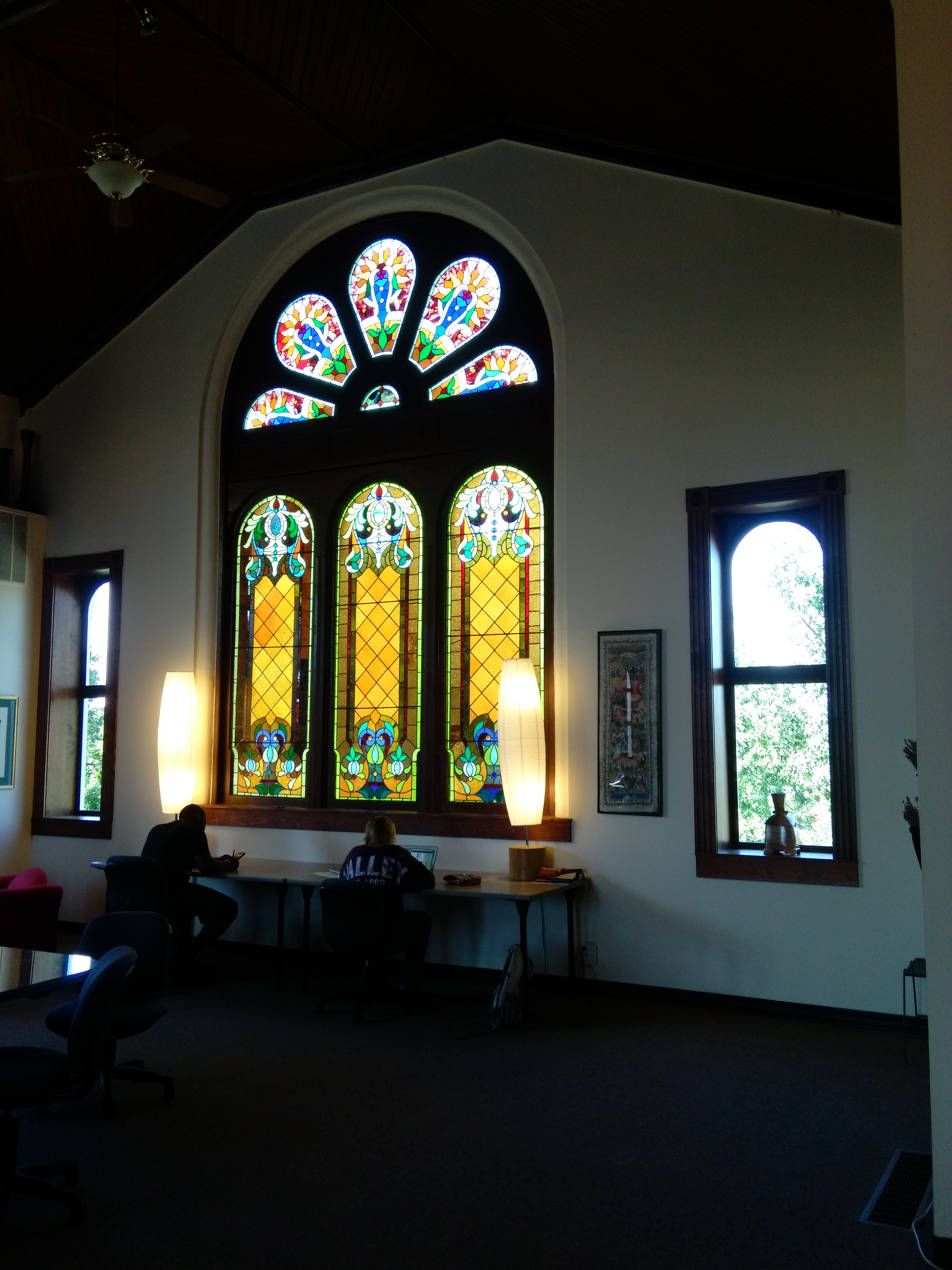
Stained Glass Windows in the Learning Center
