= W. Alan McCollough =

American businessman

W. Alan McCollough (born 1950) is an American businessman.

== Biography ==
=== Education ===
McCollough graduated from Missouri Valley College in 1971, where he was a member of Tau Kappa Epsilon fraternity, and received an M.B.A. from Southern Illinois University in 1974.

=== Career ===
From 1975 to 1987, he worked at Milliken & Company, including as director of marketing. He joined Circuit City in 1987. He became assistant vice president in 1989, president of central operations in 1991 and senior vice president of merchandising in 1994. He served as president and chief operating officer from 1997 to 2000, as president and CEO from 2000 to 2002, and as chairman and CEO from 2002 to 2005.

He sits on the board of directors of the Goodyear Tire and Rubber Company (since 2007), La-Z-Boy and the VF Corporation. He has served on the board of the Consumer Electronics Association.

He sits on the board of trustees of the Joslin Diabetes Center.

He sits on the board of directors of the VIM-Volunteers In Medicine clinic Hilton Head.
