= Hardeman County =

Hardeman County is the name of two counties in the United States:

- Hardeman County, Tennessee
- Hardeman County, Texas
