= Hardeman, Santa Cruz =

Coordinates: 16.6761°S 63.6172°W

Hardeman
- Town
- Interactive map of Hardeman
- Country: Bolivia
- Time zone: UTC-4 (BOT)

Hardeman is a small South American town in Bolivia in the department of Santa Cruz.
