= Nelson, Missouri =

- City
- Location of Nelson, Missouri
- Coordinates: 38°59′40″N 93°01′51″W
- Country: United States
- State: Missouri
- County: Saline

Area
  - Total: 0.33 sq mi (0.85 km^{2})
  - Land: 0.33 sq mi (0.85 km^{2})
  - Water: 0 sq mi (0.00 km^{2})
- Elevation: 650 ft (200 m)

Population (2020)
  - Total: 152
  - Density: 461.6/sq mi (178.22/km^{2})
- Time zone: UTC-6 (Central (CST))
  - Summer (DST): UTC-5 (CDT)
- ZIP code: 65347
- Area code: 660
- FIPS code: 29-51500
- GNIS feature ID: 2395166

Nelson is a city in Saline County, Missouri, United States. The population was 152 at the 2020 census.

== History ==
Nelson was platted in 1887, and named after the Nelson family, the original owners of the town site. A post office called Nelson was in operation from 1887 until 2011.

== Geography ==
According to the United States Census Bureau, the city has a total area of 0.33 square miles (0.85 km^{2}), all land.

== Demographics ==
Historical population
Census	Pop.	Note	%±
1890	383		—
1900	468		22.2%
1910	480		2.6%
1920	639		33.1%
1930	337		−47.3%
1940	334		−0.9%
1950	297		−11.1%
1960	126		−57.6%
1970	230		82.5%
1980	248		7.8%
1990	181		−27.0%
2000	212		17.1%
2010	192		−9.4%
2020	152		−20.8%
U.S. Decennial Census

=== 2020 census ===
As of the census of 2020, there were 152 people, 74 households, and 62 families living in the city. The population density was 460.0 inhabitants per square mile (177.6/km^{2}). There were 74 housing units at an average density of 224.2 units per square mile (86.6 units/km^{2}). The racial makeup of the city was 91.4% White, 2.0% African American, 0.7% Native American, 1.3% Asian, and 4.6% from two or more races. Hispanic or Latino of any race were 1.3% of the population.

There were 64 households, of which 43.8% were married couples living together, 10.9% had a female householder with no husband present, 0.0% had a male householder with no wife present, and 45.3% were non-families. 28.2% of all households were made up of individuals, and 11.5% had someone living alone who was 65 years of age or older. The average family size was 2.81.

The median age in the city was 38.6 years. 9.3% of residents were under the age of 5; 26.5% were under the age of 18; 73.5% were 18 years of age or older; and 16.7% were 65 years of age or older.

=== 2010 census ===
As of the census of 2010, there were 192 people, 78 households, and 51 families living in the city. The population density was 581.8 inhabitants per square mile (224.6/km^{2}). There were 91 housing units at an average density of 275.8 units per square mile (106.5 units/km^{2}). The racial makeup of the city was 91.7% White, 3.1% African American, 0.5% Native American, 0.5% Asian, and 4.2% from two or more races. Hispanic or Latino of any race were 1.0% of the population.

There were 78 households, of which 35.9% had children under the age of 18 living with them, 48.7% were married couples living together, 11.5% had a female householder with no husband present, 5.1% had a male householder with no wife present, and 34.6% were non-families. 28.2% of all households were made up of individuals, and 11.5% had someone living alone who was 65 years of age or older. The average household size was 2.46 and the average family size was 2.84.

The median age in the city was 40.8 years. 26% of residents were under the age of 18; 6.8% were between the ages of 18 and 24; 24.5% were from 25 to 44; 32.9% were from 45 to 64; and 9.9% were 65 years of age or older. The gender makeup of the city was 50.0% male and 50.0% female.

=== 2000 census ===
As of the census of 2000, there were 212 people, 83 households, and 58 families living in the city. The population density was 640.5 inhabitants per square mile (247.3/km^{2}). There were 100 housing units at an average density of 302.1 units per square mile (116.6 units/km^{2}). The racial makeup of the city was 93.40% White, 6.13% African American, and 0.47% from two or more races.

There were 83 households, out of which 28.9% had children under the age of 18 living with them, 53.0% were married couples living together, 9.6% had a female householder with no husband present, and 30.1% were non-families. 16.9% of all households were made up of individuals, and 8.4% had someone living alone who was 65 years of age or older. The average household size was 2.55 and the average family size was 2.95.

In the city the population was spread out, with 24.1% under the age of 18, 5.7% from 18 to 24, 33.0% from 25 to 44, 25.0% from 45 to 64, and 12.3% who were 65 years of age or older. The median age was 38 years. For every 100 females there were 98.1 males. For every 100 females age 18 and over, there were 96.3 males.

The median income for a household in the city was $28,214, and the median income for a family was $31,250. Males had a median income of $24,219 versus $16,500 for females. The per capita income for the city was $12,886. About 6.3% of families and 11.8% of the population were below the poverty line, including 22.2% of those under the age of eighteen and 10.5% of those 65 or over.

== Education ==
It is in the Blackwater R-II School District, an elementary school district.
