= Hardeman, Missouri =

Unincorporated community in Missouri, US

Coordinates: 39°05′22″N 93°00′38″W

Hardeman is an unincorporated community in Saline County, in the U.S. state of Missouri.

== History ==
A post office called Hardemann was established in 1890, and remained in operation until 1906. The community has the name of the Hardeman family of settlers.
