= Blue Lick, Missouri =

Unincorporated community in Missouri, U.S.

Coordinates: 39°00′48″N 93°12′37″W

Blue Lick is an unincorporated community in Saline County, in the U.S. state of Missouri.

== History ==
A post office called Blue Lick was established in 1890, and remained in operation until 1934. The community was named after nearby Blue Lick Springs.
