= Elmwood, Missouri =

Unincorporated community in the US state of Missouri

Coordinates: 39.068630°N 93.432988°W

Elmwood is an unincorporated community in Saline County, in the U.S. state of Missouri.

== History ==
Elmwood was platted in 1867. A variant spelling was "Elm Wood". A post office called Elm Wood was established in 1851, and remained in operation until 1907.
