= Marshall, Missouri =

City in Missouri, U.S.

- City
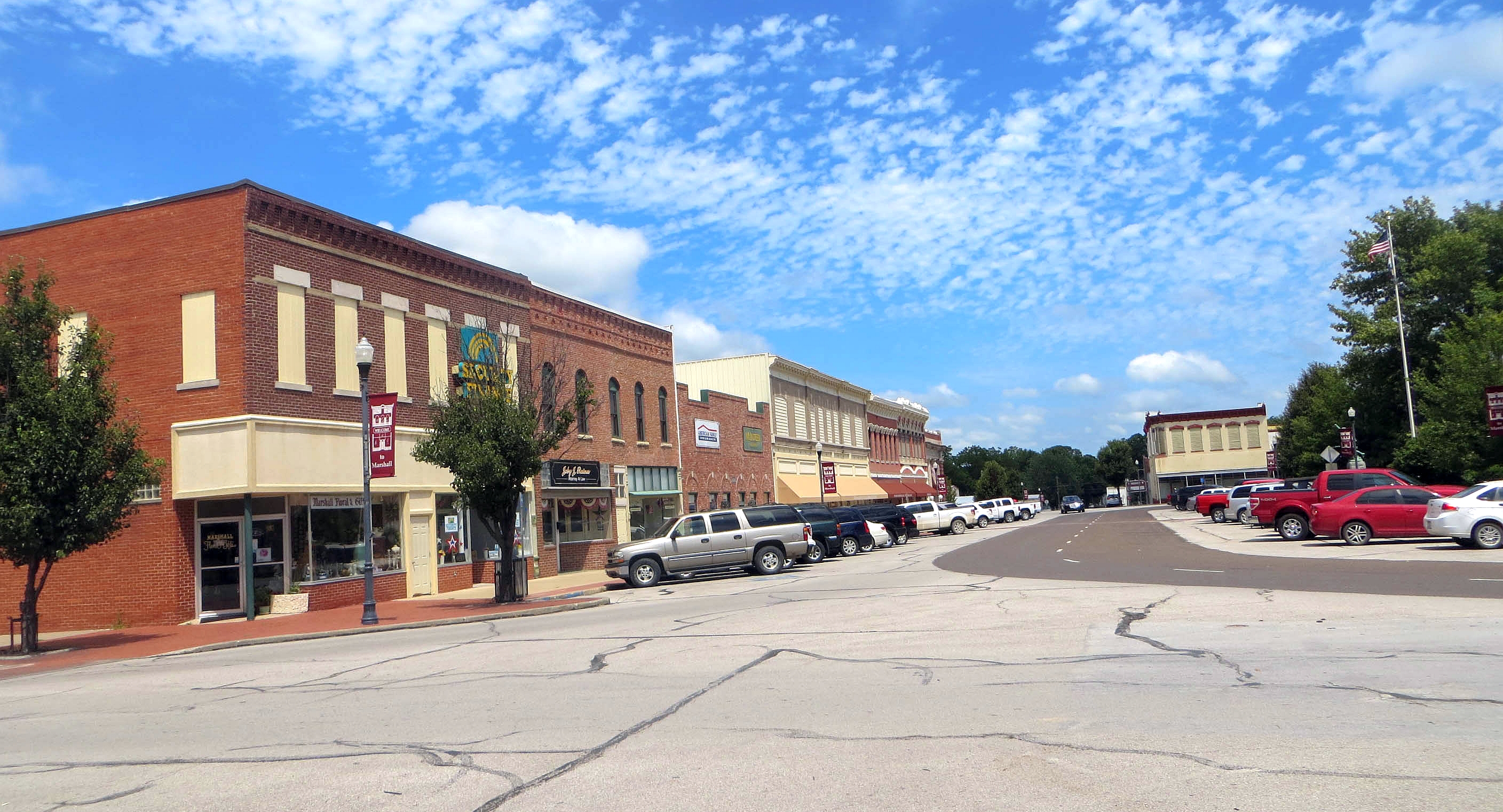
- North Street in Marshall

- Location of Marshall, Missouri
- Coordinates: 39°6′58″N 93°11′52″W
- Country: United States
- State: Missouri
- County: Saline

Government
  - Mayor: Craig Thompson
  - City Administrator: JD Kehrman

Area
  - Total: 10.20 sq mi (26.41 km^{2})
  - Land: 10.12 sq mi (26.22 km^{2})
  - Water: 0.073 sq mi (0.19 km^{2})
- Elevation: 774 ft (236 m)

Population (2020)
  - Total: 13,806
  - Density: 1,364.0/sq mi (526.63/km^{2})
- Time zone: UTC-6 (Central (CST))
  - Summer (DST): UTC-5 (CDT)
- ZIP code: 65340
- Area code: 660
- FIPS code: 29-46316
- GNIS feature ID: 2395023
- Website: City website

Marshall is a city in and the county seat of Saline County, Missouri, United States. The population was 13,806 at the 2020 census. The Marshall Micropolitan Statistical Area consists of Saline County. It is home to Missouri Valley University.

== History ==
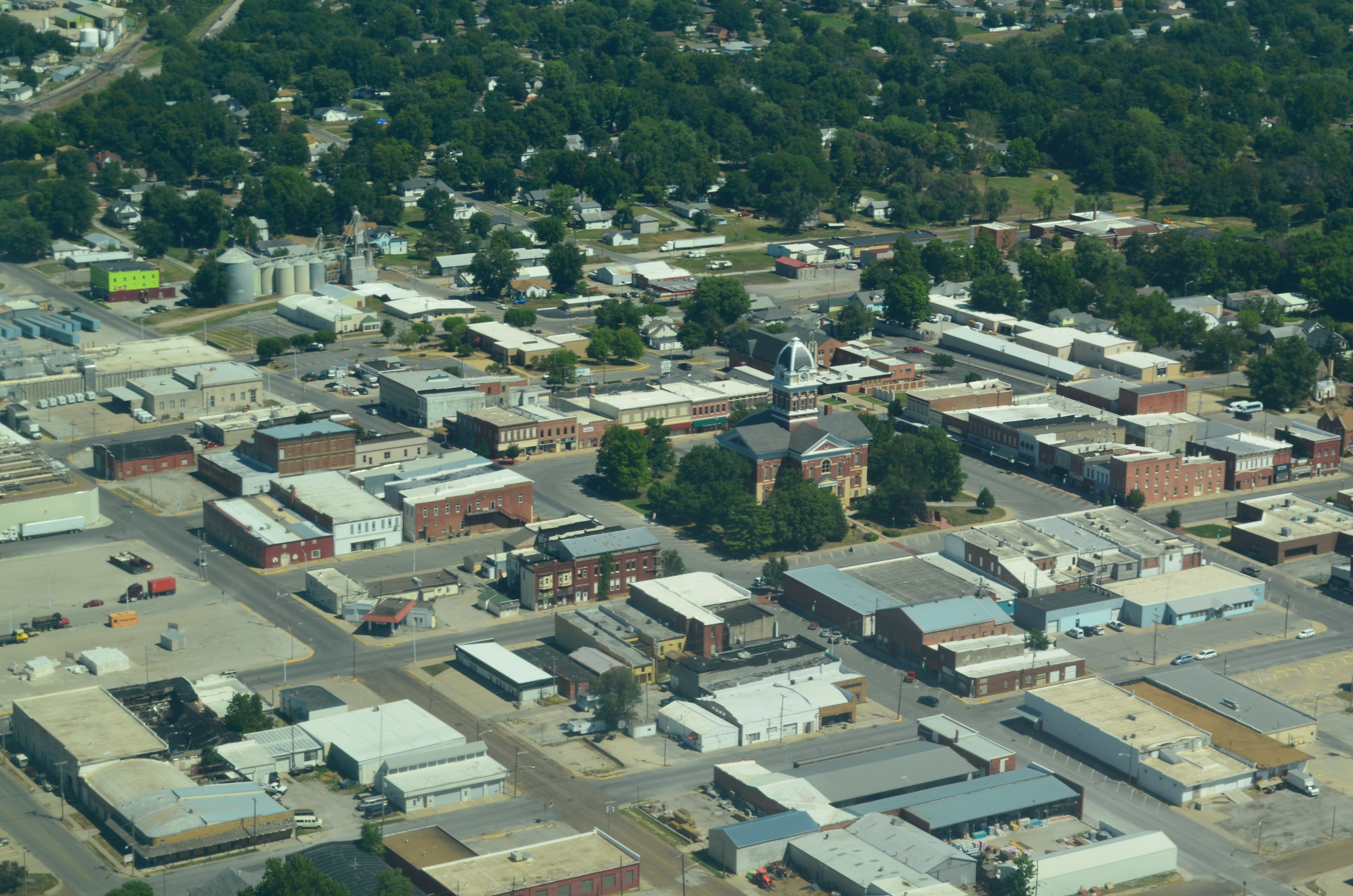
Aerial view of Marshall, September 2013

Sixty-five acres (26 ha) of land for the city of Marshall was donated by Jeremiah O’Dell, deeded on April 13, 1839. It was named for the United States Supreme Court Chief Justice, John Marshall, when chosen for the county seat. After the first two courthouses in Marshall were lost to fires, the Saline County Courthouse was constructed in January 1882; it was placed on the National Register of Historic Places in 1977. The courthouse is an enduring landmark in the center of the Marshall Square, and a legacy of Nineteenth-Century architecture.

The Nicholas-Beazley Airplane Company was an American aircraft manufacturer headquartered in Marshall in the 1920s and 1930s. At its peak, the company produced as many as one aircraft per day. In 1937, production of aircraft ceased, due to economic pressures from the Great Depression. Today, the Nicholas Beazley Aviation Museum is located at the Marshall Airport, with artifacts of interest from aviation history. ConAgra Foods owns the property of the old Nicholas-Beazley Airplane Company factory building, located right off the Marshall square; the factory building was torn down in the summer of 2015 to expand the ConAgra plant.

Marshall is rich in music history. Marshall is the home of Bob James, the acclaimed jazz musician; the Foothills Fest Music Festival; The Marshall Municipal Band; and, notably, the Marshall Philharmonic Orchestra. The Orchestra performs every year for the public, free of charge, and has been featured in the Los Angeles Times in 2006 and on NBC's American Almanac in December 1985, among other media outlets. The Philharmonic Orchestra has been performing for 52 years and counting. The Municipal Band has been performing for over 100 years and usually performs on the Courthouse lawn every Thursday evening during the summer months, filling the town square with music.

Marshall is also home to Jim the Wonder Dog. Jim earned his reputation as a 'wonder dog' during the 1930s, puzzling psychologists from both Washington University in St. Louis and University of Missouri. Dr. A. J. Durant, director of the School of Veterinary Medicine, tested Jim's abilities in a public demonstration. He concluded that Jim, "possessed an occult power that might never come again to a dog in many generations." Jim seemed to have the ability to guess the sex of an unborn baby and answer to orders in many different languages even though his owner, Sam Van Arsdale, spoke only English. Jim the Wonder Dog picked the winner of the Kentucky Derby seven years in a row, and also predicted the Yankees' victory in the 1936 World Series. A joint session of the Missouri Legislature was called in order to witness the talents of Jim. He died March 18, 1937.

During the Civil War, Marshall was frequently garrisoned by Union troops and was considered of some symbolic significance. This was due to Marshall's close proximity to Arrow Rock (the hometown of the former Missouri governor in exile, Claiborne Fox Jackson). Before the Battle of Boonville, the former Governor Claiborne Fox Jackson ordered munition power to be removed from the Jefferson City to Boonville by boat. Where it was then hidden amongst the fields of counties of Cooper, Saline, etc. This powder was referred to as the Kelly Powder. In addition, after the events of July 19, 1859 (when three black men were lynched outside the county courthouse) had reached Northern media outlets. It prompted pro unionist to refer to Marshall, Missouri as “the place where men are burned at the stake.” Often labeling the residents as unruly. Numerous citizens were arrested on suspicion of feeding confederate bushwhackers, or for having sympathies to the "Southern Cause". Although Marshall was strategically unimportant, it was considered symbolic to the “Southern Cause”. Which ultimately led to the town being the victim of two Confederate raids, the burning of the County court house in August 1864, and the site of the October 13, 1863, Battle of Marshall, the climax of Colonel J. O. Shelby's 1863 "Great Raid". Confronted by a larger force of 1,800 Federal troops and Missouri State Militia, Shelby broke through, divided his command and withdrew from Missouri.

Missouri Valley University was founded in Marshall in 1889. The history of Missouri Valley began during a conference at Sarcoxie, Missouri, on October 27, 1874, where the representatives of the several Presbyterian synods in the state of Missouri met to discuss founding the school. The school was affiliated with the Cumberland Presbyterian Church for a long period.

The university's original building, Baity Hall, was built in 1889, the year of the university's founding, and is listed on the National Register of Historic Places. The Victorian Era building is notable for its beautiful wooden staircase, vaulted wooden ceilings, and stained glass windows. Missouri Valley University is a private, four-year liberal arts university affiliated with the Presbyterian Church (USA). The 150-acre (60.7 ha) campus is found within the city limits of Marshall. The university supports 27 academic majors and an enrollment close to 1,800 students. Missouri Valley is accredited by the Higher Learning Commission, a Commission of the North Central Association of Colleges and Schools.

In addition to Baity Hall, the Chicago and Alton Depot, First Presbyterian Church, Fitzgibbon Hospital, Free Will Baptist Church of Pennytown, Mt. Carmel Historic District, Saline County Courthouse, Utz Site, Van Meter State Park Combination Building, and Van Meter State Park Shelter Building are listed on the National Register of Historic Places.

== Geography ==
According to the United States Census Bureau, the city has a total area of 10.28 square miles (26.63 km^{2}), of which 10.22 square miles (26.47 km^{2}) is land and 0.06 square miles (0.16 km^{2}) is water.

=== Climate ===
Marshall has a hot-summer humid continental climate (Köppen: Dfa).

Climate data for Marshall, Missouri (1991–2020 normals, extremes 1893–present)
Month	Jan	Feb	Mar	Apr	May	Jun	Jul	Aug	Sep	Oct	Nov	Dec	Year
Record high °F (°C)	75 (24)	82 (28)	92 (33)	97 (36)	101 (38)	105 (41)	112 (44)	110 (43)	105 (41)	97 (36)	87 (31)	74 (23)	112 (44)
Mean maximum °F (°C)	61.4 (16.3)	67.4 (19.7)	76.9 (24.9)	83.8 (28.8)	88.8 (31.6)	93.5 (34.2)	97.0 (36.1)	97.3 (36.3)	92.7 (33.7)	85.7 (29.8)	73.4 (23.0)	64.7 (18.2)	98.9 (37.2)
Mean daily maximum °F (°C)	36.8 (2.7)	42.3 (5.7)	53.8 (12.1)	64.9 (18.3)	74.6 (23.7)	83.7 (28.7)	87.5 (30.8)	86.1 (30.1)	79.3 (26.3)	67.3 (19.6)	53.1 (11.7)	41.4 (5.2)	64.2 (17.9)
Daily mean °F (°C)	27.8 (−2.3)	32.4 (0.2)	43.0 (6.1)	53.8 (12.1)	64.5 (18.1)	73.7 (23.2)	77.4 (25.2)	75.5 (24.2)	67.8 (19.9)	56.0 (13.3)	43.1 (6.2)	32.6 (0.3)	54.0 (12.2)
Mean daily minimum °F (°C)	18.9 (−7.3)	22.5 (−5.3)	32.3 (0.2)	42.6 (5.9)	54.3 (12.4)	63.7 (17.6)	67.4 (19.7)	64.8 (18.2)	56.3 (13.5)	44.7 (7.1)	33.2 (0.7)	23.8 (−4.6)	43.7 (6.5)
Mean minimum °F (°C)	−1.2 (−18.4)	4.3 (−15.4)	14.4 (−9.8)	28.3 (−2.1)	40.5 (4.7)	52.3 (11.3)	58.0 (14.4)	55.3 (12.9)	41.2 (5.1)	29.2 (−1.6)	17.0 (−8.3)	6.0 (−14.4)	−4.7 (−20.4)
Record low °F (°C)	−21 (−29)	−26 (−32)	−14 (−26)	6 (−14)	25 (−4)	39 (4)	46 (8)	40 (4)	28 (−2)	18 (−8)	−3 (−19)	−24 (−31)	−26 (−32)
Average precipitation inches (mm)	1.46 (37)	1.90 (48)	3.00 (76)	4.39 (112)	5.47 (139)	5.10 (130)	4.63 (118)	3.88 (99)	4.04 (103)	3.20 (81)	2.64 (67)	2.06 (52)	41.77 (1,061)
Average snowfall inches (cm)	3.0 (7.6)	2.2 (5.6)	0.9 (2.3)	0.0 (0.0)	0.0 (0.0)	0.0 (0.0)	0.0 (0.0)	0.0 (0.0)	0.0 (0.0)	0.1 (0.25)	0.3 (0.76)	1.6 (4.1)	8.1 (21)
Average precipitation days (≥ 0.01 in)	6.6	6.8	9.9	11.1	11.9	10.6	9.2	8.4	8.0	8.6	7.7	7.4	106.2
Average snowy days (≥ 0.1 in)	1.5	1.2	0.3	0.0	0.0	0.0	0.0	0.0	0.0	0.0	0.3	1.0	4.3
Source: NOAA

== Demographics ==
Historical population
Census	Pop.	Note	%±
1880	2,701		—
1890	4,297		59.1%
1900	5,086		18.4%
1910	4,869		−4.3%
1920	5,200		6.8%
1930	8,103		55.8%
1940	8,533		5.3%
1950	8,850		3.7%
1960	9,572		8.2%
1970	12,051		25.9%
1980	12,781		6.1%
1990	12,711		−0.5%
2000	12,433		−2.2%
2010	13,065		5.1%
2020	13,806		5.7%
U.S. Decennial Census

=== 2020 census ===
As of the 2020 census, Marshall had a population of 13,806. The population density was 1,364.2 per square mile (526.5/km^{2}). There were 2,521 families. The median age was 31.2 years. 22.5% of residents were under the age of 18 and 14.9% of residents were 65 years of age or older. For every 100 females there were 100.7 males, and for every 100 females age 18 and over there were 100.0 males age 18 and over.

97.5% of residents lived in urban areas, while 2.5% lived in rural areas.

There were 4,640 households in Marshall, of which 33.3% had children under the age of 18 living in them. Of all households, 42.3% were married-couple households, 18.3% were households with a male householder and no spouse or partner present, and 30.6% were households with a female householder and no spouse or partner present. About 29.7% of all households were made up of individuals and 13.3% had someone living alone who was 65 years of age or older. The average household size was 2.7 and the average family size was 3.6.

There were 5,342 housing units, of which 13.1% were vacant. The homeowner vacancy rate was 3.1% and the rental vacancy rate was 10.0%.

Racial composition as of the 2020 census
Race	Number	Percent
White	9,248	67.0%
Black or African American	974	7.1%
American Indian and Alaska Native	71	0.5%
Asian	150	1.1%
Native Hawaiian and Other Pacific Islander	403	2.9%
Some other race	1,739	12.6%
Two or more races	1,221	8.8%
Hispanic or Latino (of any race)	2,598	18.8%

=== Income and poverty ===
The 2016–2020 5-year American Community Survey estimates show that the median household income was $44,076 (with a margin of error of +/- $4,147) and the median family income was $61,086 (+/- $3,178). Males had a median income of $28,378 (+/- $2,408) versus $23,972 (+/- $2,824) for females. The median income for those above 16 years old was $26,055 (+/- $1,879). Approximately, 12.4% of families and 18.6% of the population were below the poverty line, including 27.1% of those under the age of 18 and 14.0% of those ages 65 or over.

=== 2010 census ===
As of the census of 2010, there were 13,065 people, 4,741 households, and 2,946 families living in the city. The population density was 1,278.4 inhabitants per square mile (493.6/km^{2}). There were 5,276 housing units at an average density of 516.2 per square mile (199.3/km^{2}). The racial makeup of the city was 79.2% White, 7.8% African American, 0.4% Native American, 0.7% Asian, 1.2% Pacific Islander, 7.7% from other races, and 3.0% from two or more races. Hispanic or Latino of any race were 13.2% of the population.

There were 4,741 households, of which 33.6% had children under the age of 18 living with them, 42.4% were married couples living together, 14.1% had a female householder with no husband present, 5.6% had a male householder with no wife present, and 37.9% were non-families. 30.5% of all households were made up of individuals, and 14.1% had someone living alone who was 65 years of age or older. The average household size was 2.49 and the average family size was 3.07.

The median age in the city was 32.9 years. 23.8% of residents were under the age of 18; 15.8% were between the ages of 18 and 24; 23.5% were from 25 to 44; 22.8% were from 45 to 64; and 14.2% were 65 years of age or older. The gender makeup of the city was 49.2% male and 50.8% female.

=== 2000 census ===
As of the 2000 census, with a population of 12,433, showed 4,732 households, and 2,985 families living in the city. The population density was 1,225.4 inhabitants per square mile (473.1/km^{2}). There were 5,127 housing units at an average density of 505.3 per square mile (195.1/km^{2}). The racial makeup of the city was 86.05% White, 7.40% African American, 0.43% Native American, 0.39% Asian, 0.34% Pacific Islander, 3.46% from other races, and 1.94% from two or more races. Hispanic or Latino of any race were 7.17% of the population.

There were 4,732 households, out of which 30.7% had children under the age of 18 living with them, 45.8% were married couples living together, 12.9% had a female householder with no husband present, and 36.9% were non-families. 31.1% of all households were made up of individuals, and 15.4% had someone living alone who was 65 years of age or older. The average household size was 2.42 and the average family size was 3.00.

In the city, the population was spread out, with 24.7% under the age of 18, 13.0% from 18 to 24, 25.3% from 25 to 44, 21.8% from 45 to 64, and 15.3% who were 65 years of age or older. The median age was 36 years. For every 100 females, there were 95.3 males. For every 100 females age 18 and over, there were 93.5 males.

The median income for a household in the city was $31,649, and the median income for a family was $36,686. Males had a median income of $26,556 versus $19,688 for females. The per capita income for the city was $16,646. About 12.5% of families and 15.0% of the population were below the poverty line, including 23.6% of those under age 18 and 5.1% of those age 65 or over.

== Censorship debate ==
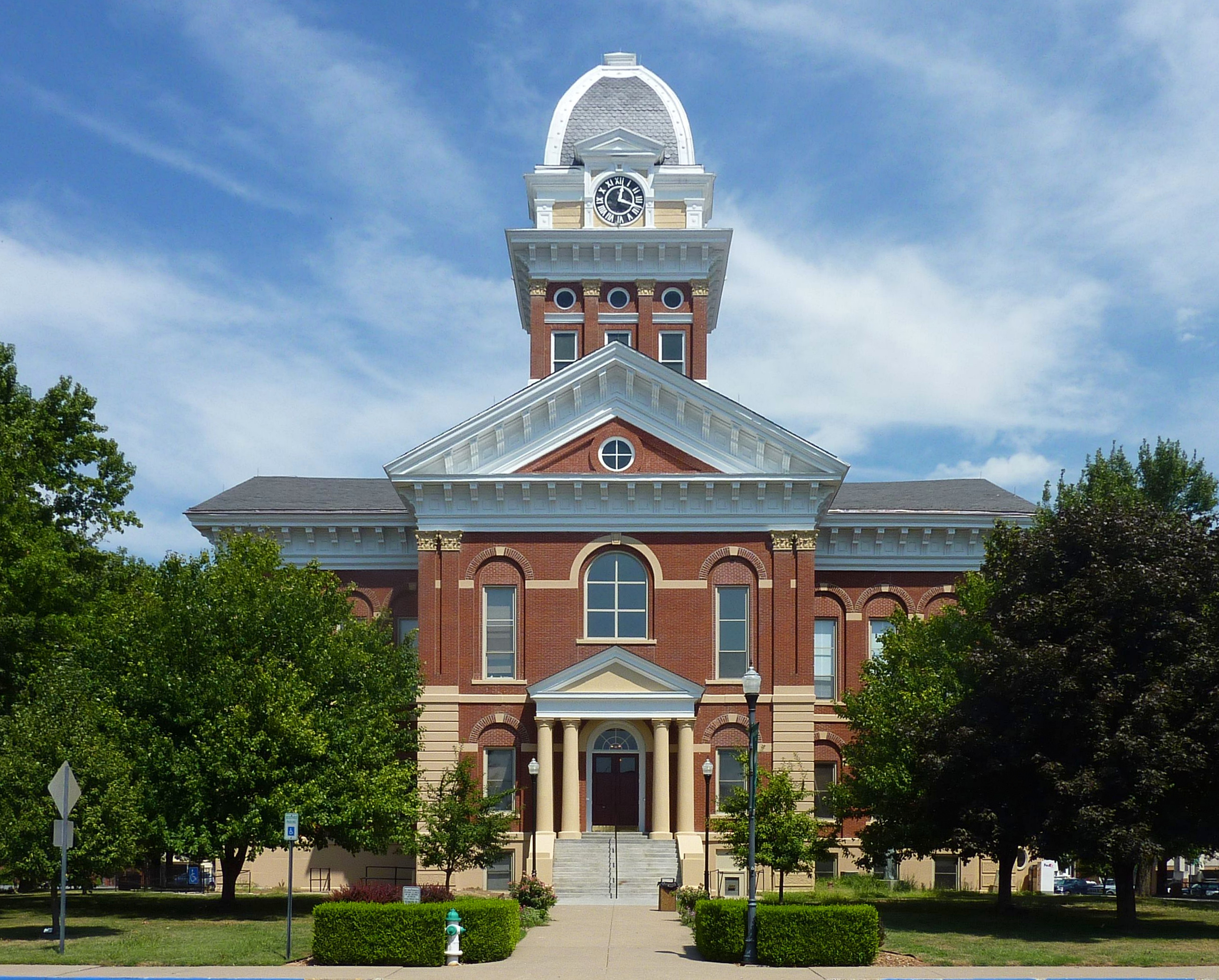
Saline County Courthouse in Marshall, August 2010

In October 2006, a resident of Marshall attempted to have the graphic novels Fun Home, by Alison Bechdel, and Blankets, by Craig Thompson, removed from the Marshall Public Library. Supporters of the books' removal characterized them as "pornography" and expressed concern that they would be read by children. Marshall Public Library Director Amy Crump defended the books as having been well-reviewed in "reputable, professional book review journals," and characterized the removal attempt as a step towards "the slippery slope of censorship". On October 11, 2006, the Marshall Public Library Board of Trustees appointed a committee to create a materials selection policy, and removed Fun Home and Blankets from circulation until the new policy was approved. On March 14, 2007, the board voted to return both Fun Home and Blankets to the library's shelves.

== Education ==
The Marshall Public School District serves Marshall in K-12 education. Missouri Valley University is located in Marshall.

Marshall has a lending library, the Marshall Public Library.

== Notable people ==
- Walt Housman, American football player
- Bob James, jazz musician
- Noble Johnson, actor
- Cynthelia Isgrig Knefler, social worker, labor organizer, suffragist
- Chelsea Liu, figure skater (pairs)
- Robert Pearson McChesney, artist
- Doc Quigg, journalist
- Twila Tanner, contestant on Survivor: Vanuatu

== Notable animal ==
- Jim the Wonder Dog - Noted hunting dog with a park in town named for him.

== See also ==
- List of cities in Missouri
- Impact of the 2019–20 coronavirus pandemic on the meat industry in the United States
