= New Frankfort, Missouri =

Unincorporated community in Missouri, U.S.

Coordinates: 39°18′20″N 93°00′22″W

New Frankfort is an unincorporated community in Saline County, in the U.S. state of Missouri.

== History ==
New Frankfort was originally called Frankfort, and under the latter name was platted in 1858, and named after Frankfurt, in Germany, the native land of a large share of the first settlers. A post office called New Frankfort was established in 1863, and remained in operation until 1907.
