= Cynthelia Isgrig Knefler =

American social worker (1872-1942

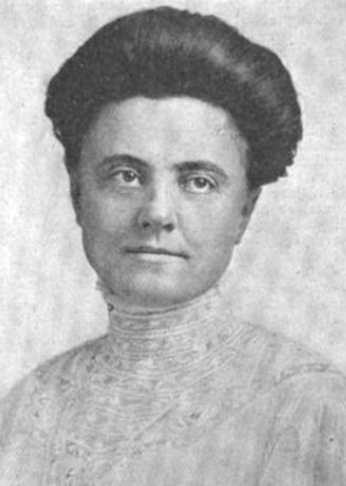
- Knefler, from a 1909 publication
- Born: Cynthelia Eleanor Isgrig; June 30, 1872; Marshall, Missouri, U.S.
- Died: November 5, 1942 (aged 70); Los Angeles, California, U.S.
- Occupations: Social worker, suffragist, labor organizer, poultry farmer, businesswoman

Cynthelia Eleanor Isgrig Knefler (June 30, 1872 – November 5, 1942) was an American social worker, suffragist, and labor organizer. She co-founded the Women's Trade Union League of St. Louis with Hannah Hennessy in 1908, and served on the league's national board. Later in life, she raised pigeons in southern California.

== Early life and education ==
Isgrig was born in Marshall, Missouri, the daughter of John N. Isgrig. She attended Monticello Female Seminary in Illinois for a few years. She moved to Arizona with her family as a young woman.

== Career ==
Knefler was a social worker at the Self-Culture Hall, a settlement house in St. Louis. She was active with the Pure Milk Commission, the Tuberculosis Society, and the Society for Social Hygiene. She and Hannah Hennessy founded the Women's Trade Union League of St. Louis in 1908. She was president of the league in 1910 and 1911. She served on the executive board of the National Women's Trade Union League. She was also an officer of the Missouri Equal Suffrage League.

Knefler moved to Los Angeles in 1913, with her husband. In widowhood she ran a 10-acre squab ranch and boarding house with her sister, Isabelle Isgrig. She wrote articles about raising pigeons. In 1926, she had over a thousand birds in her flock, including quail, pheasants, peacocks, geese, ducks, and doves.

== Publications ==
- "The Girls in the St. Louis Breweries" (1910, Union Labor Advocate)
- "What a Novice Has Done with Pure-Bred Swiss" (1924, American Pigeon Journal)
- "A Few Essentials to Successful Raising of Pigeons" (1924, American Pigeon Journal)

== Personal life ==
Isgrig was married to William S. Jackson; they divorced in 1901. She married Daniel Webster Knefler in 1901, in Texas. He died in 1917. She died in 1942, at the age of 70, in Los Angeles.
