= Missouri Valley University =

Presbyterian university in Marshall, Missouri, US

- Former name: Missouri Valley College (1889–2026)
- Type: Private university
- Established: 1889
- President: Joseph A. Parisi
- Students: 1,769
- Location: Marshall, Missouri, United States; 39°06′29″N 93°11′26″W
- Campus: Rural, 150 acres (60.7 ha)
- Colors: Purple & Orange
- Nickname: Vikings
- Sporting affiliations: NAIA – HAAC
- Website: www.moval.edu

Missouri Valley University, formerly Missouri Valley College, is a private university in Marshall, Missouri, United States. The university was founded in 1889 and supports 40 academic majors and an enrollment close to 1,800 students. Missouri Valley University is accredited by the Higher Learning Commission.

== History ==
Missouri Valley University was founded in 1889. The history of Missouri Valley University began during a conference at Sarcoxie, Missouri, on October 27, 1874, where the representatives of the several Presbyterian synods in the state of Missouri met to discuss founding the school.

The university’s original building, Old Main or Baity Hall (Old Main was renamed to honor the Rev. Dr. George P. Baity, an early graduate and president of the Board of Trustees from 1918 to 1947) was built in 1889 as a sprawling three-storey brick building with towers, turrets, gables, and Gothic adornments in the Victorian style of the era. It housed all functions of the university: classrooms, offices, gymnasiums for men and women, a chapel, dining hall, library, museum, dorms, and laboratories. Still presiding over the campus today, and listed on the National Register of Historic Places National Register of Historic Places. The Victorian era building is notable for its wooden staircase, vaulted wooden ceilings and stained glass windows located throughout the building, most notably on the third floor.

A large room on the south wing's third floor is cruciform in shape with glass windows and vaulted wooden ceilings, it has served as a chapel and gymnasium. Renovated in the summer of 2002, it now serves the Alumni Recognition Center and Museum.

In 1890, students planted 1,200 evergreen and deciduous trees on the campus. The arboretum has specimens of many species, including ginkgo biloba trees, American chestnuts, a sycamore, and the state's largest catalpa tree, which stands 89 feet high and 215 inches around with a crown spread of 65 feet.

On August 15, the university changed its name from Missouri Valley College.

=== Presidents ===
- William H. Black, 1890–1926
- George H. Mack, 1927–1938
- Thomas H. Bibb, 1938–1943
- J. Ray Cable, 1944–1948
- Harold Roe Bartle, 1948–1950
- M. Earle Collins, 1951–1968
- W. L. Tompkins, 1968–1974
- Donald C. Ziemke, 1975–1979
- Robert J. Glass, 1979–1983
- Earl J. Reeves, 1983–1994
- J. Kenneth Bryant, 1994–2001
- Chadwick B. Freeman, 2001–2004
- Bonnie L. Humphrey, 2005–2023
- Joseph A. Parisi, 2023–Present

== Nonprofit Leadership Alliance ==
From 1945 to 1952, Harold Roe Bartle served as president of Missouri Valley. In 1948 Bartle founded and contributed $100,000 toward establishing the American Humanics Foundation, now the Nonprofit Leadership Alliance, a philanthropic organization intended to prepare young people for careers in professional youth leadership in such organizations as the Boy Scouts, Camp Fire Girls, and the YWCA. As of 2018, the Alliance had programs at more than 40 college campuses, where students could earn the Certified Nonprofit Leadership credential. Harold Roe Bartle, later served as mayor of Kansas City, Missouri, and is namesake of Bartle Hall. George Miller was also instrumental in the founding of the AHF.

== Academics ==
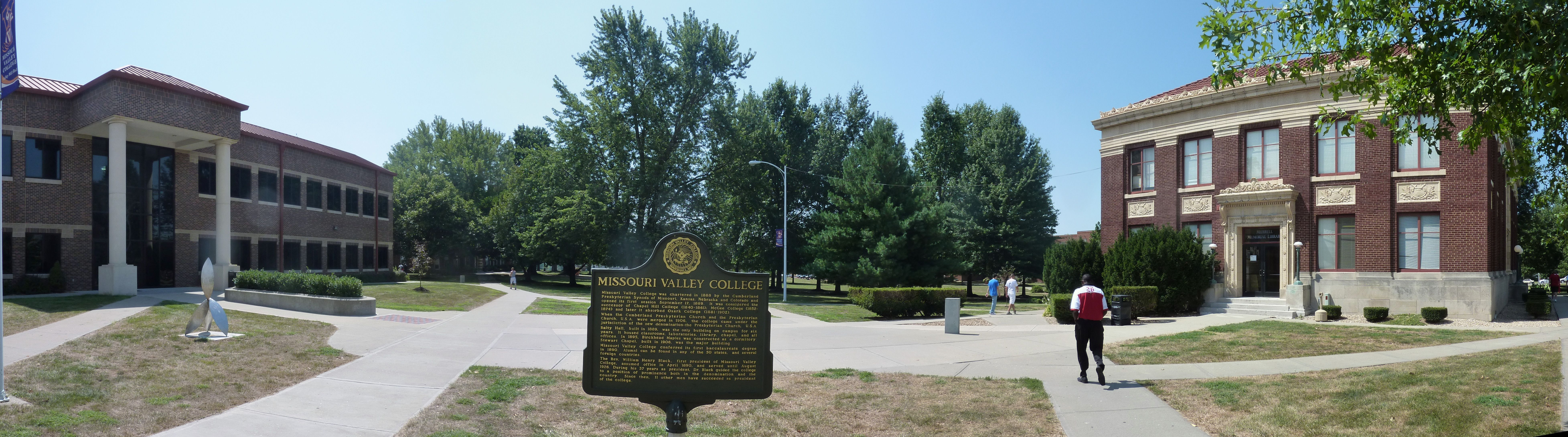

The university has over 25 majors. Recently added are a nursing program, the college's first master's degree in community counseling, and various online courses.

== Athletics ==
The Missouri Valley athletic teams are called the Vikings. The university is a member of the National Association of Intercollegiate Athletics (NAIA), primarily competing as a founding member of the Heart of America Athletic Conference (HAAC) since its inception in the 1971–72 academic year. The Vikings previously competed in the Missouri College Athletic Union (MCAU) from 1924–25 to 1970–71.

Missouri Valley competes in 29 intercollegiate varsity sports: Men's sports include baseball, basketball, bowling, cross country, football, golf, lacrosse, powerlifting, rodeo, soccer, tennis, track & field, volleyball and wrestling; while women's sports include basketball, cross country, golf, lacrosse, powerlifting, rodeo, soccer, softball, tennis, track & field, volleyball and wrestling; and co-ed sports include competitive cheer, competitive dance, eSports and shotgun sports.

=== Accomplishments ===
Football has always been at the forefront of Missouri Valley University athletics, with 17 conference championships, a small college national title, two national runner-up finishes and 13 national bowl games. In the 2006 season, the Vikings advanced to the semi-finals of the NAIA Football National Championships, before falling to the eventual National Champions. The Vikings finished the season with a 13–1 record a #3 ranking in the final 2006 "NAIA Football Top 25 Poll."

Wrestling team accomplishments: 1991–1992, 14th nationally, four All Americans (AA); 1992–1993, 20th nationally, three AA's; 1993–1994, 13th Nationally, three AA's; 1994–1995, eighth nationally, six AA's; 1995–1996, national champions, eight AA's; 1996–1997 national champions, eight AA's; 1997–1998 national runner-up, seven AA's; 1998–1999, fifth nationally, nine AA's; 1999–2000, national runner-up, ten AA's; 2000–2001, national runner-up, nine AA's; 2001–2002, sixth nationally, seven AA's; 2002–2003, national champions, eleven AA's; 2003–2004, third nationally, eight AA's; 2004–2005, national runner-up, nine AA's; 2005–2006, seventh nationally, five AA's.

The oldest footage of the game of basketball captured on film is that of a 1904 game involving female students at Missouri Valley University.

== Notable people ==
=== Alumni ===
The alumni association comprises more than 16,760 members. Alumni are recognized by the university for meritorious activity through the Outstanding Alumnus Award, the Honorary Alumnus Award, and other special recognition.

Among the university’s notable former students and alumni are:

- Virgil Blossom, Superintendent of Schools of the Little Rock School District during the Little Rock Nine
- Mickey Burns, TV host, writer, producer
- Clarissa Chun, 5th place, 2008 Beijing Olympics (woman's wrestling-48 kg)
- LC Davis, MMA star
- Tonya Evinger, professional Mixed Martial Artist, former Invicta FC Bantamweight Champion, currently competing in the UFC
- Lou Fette, Former Major League Baseball player. 1939 NL All-Star
- Caleb Flaxey 2014 Sochi Olympic Gold Medalist, Curling
- Herbert Harris U.S. Representative from Virginia
- Ron Hall, National Football League (NFL), Pittsburgh Steelers 1959; American Football League (AFL), Boston Patriots 1961 to 1967. AFL All-Star in 1963.
- Caleb Hickman, biologist, zoologist
- Bobby Lashley (Class of 1999), professional wrestler in WWE and TNA and Mixed martial artist
- Vernetta Lesforis, gold medalist at the 1999 Central American and Caribbean Championships
- W. Alan McCollough, American businessman, Director of the Goodyear Tire and Rubber Company, La-Z-Boy and VF Corporation
- Markwayne Mullin, Department of Homeland Secretary under the second Trump Administration.
- Ameya Pawar, Chicago Alderman
- Alan M. Powell, Businessman in Scottsdale, Arizona
- Moses Regular, American football player
- Mark Samsel, Attorney and former member of the Kansas House of Representatives

=== Faculty and staff ===
- Benjamin Anderson, Austrian School economist, professor
- Volney Ashford, football coach inducted in College Football Hall of Fame
- Robert K. Enders, notable zoologist, professor
- Charles W. Gehrke, chemist, researcher, entrepreneur, professor
