= Saline County, Missouri =

County in Missouri, United States

- County
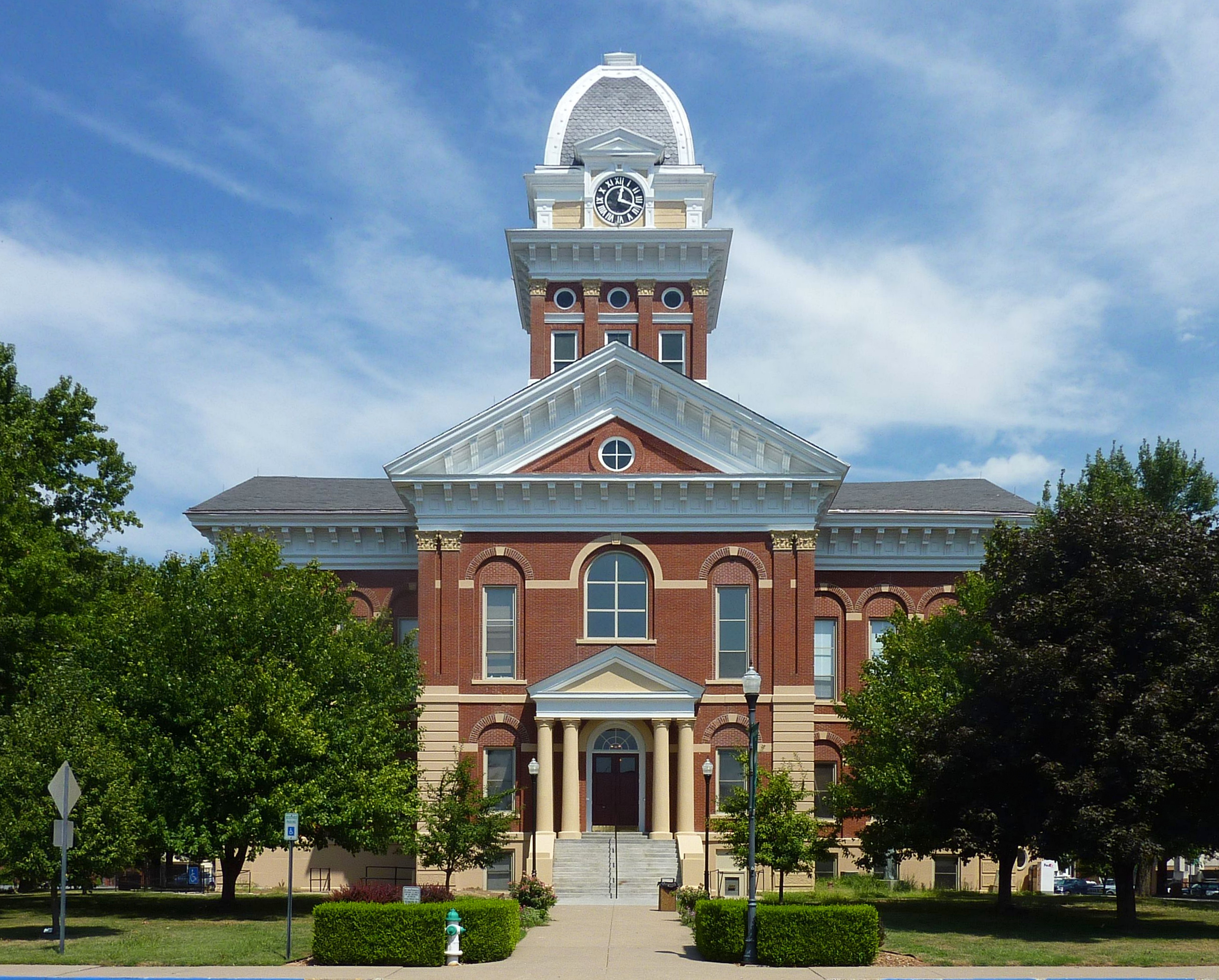
- The Saline County Courthouse in Marshall

- Location within the U.S. state of Missouri
- Coordinates: 39°08′N 93°12′W
- Country: United States
- State: Missouri
- Founded: November 25, 1820
- Named for: The salt springs in the region
- Seat: Marshall
- Largest city: Marshall

Area
  - Total: 767 sq mi (1,990 km^{2})
  - Land: 756 sq mi (1,960 km^{2})
  - Water: 11 sq mi (28 km^{2}) 1.5%

Population (2020)
  - Total: 23,333
  - Estimate (2025): 23,265 ▼
  - Density: 30.9/sq mi (11.9/km^{2})
- Time zone: UTC−6 (Central)
  - Summer (DST): UTC−5 (CDT)
- Congressional district: 4th
- Website: www.salinecountymo.gov

Saline County (/səˈliːn/ sə-LEEN) is a county located along the Missouri River in the U.S. state of Missouri. As of the 2020 census, the population was 23,333. Its county seat is Marshall. The county was established November 25, 1820, and named for the region's salt springs.

Settled primarily by migrants from the Upper South during the nineteenth century, this county was in the region bordering the Missouri River known as "Little Dixie". In the antebellum years, it had many plantations operated with the forced labor of enslaved workers. One-third of the county population was African American at the start of the American Civil War, but their proportion of the residents has declined dramatically to little more than five percent.

Saline County comprises the Marshall, Missouri Micropolitan Statistical Area.

== History ==
Saline County was occupied for thousands of years by succeeding cultures of Missouri Native Americans. Saline County was organized by European-American settlers on November 25, 1820, and was named from the salinity of the springs found in the region. After periods of conflict as settlers competed for resources and encroached on their territory, the local Native Americans, including the Osage nation, were forced by the U.S. government to move to reservations in Indian Territory, first in Kansas and then in Oklahoma.

Saline County was among several along the Missouri River that were settled primarily by migrants from the Upper South states of Kentucky, Tennessee and Virginia. The settlers quickly started cultivating crops similar to those in Middle Tennessee and Kentucky: hemp and tobacco; they had brought enslaved people with them to central Missouri, or purchased them from slave traders. These counties settled by southerners became known as "Little Dixie." By the time of the Civil War, one-third of the county population was African American; most of them were enslaved laborers on major plantations, particularly for labor-intensive tobacco cultivation. In 1847 the state legislature had prohibited any African Americans from being educated.

After the war, freedmen and poor white residents were hungry for education. The state's new constitution established public education for all citizens for the first time. It was segregated, in keeping with local custom. Each township with 20 or more African-American students were supposed to establish a school for them, but rural areas lagged in the number of schools and jurisdictions underfunded those for blacks. By the early 20th century, Saline County had eighteen schools for black students. The remaining black schools from the Jim Crow era have been studied by the State Historic Preservation Office and many are being nominated to the National Register of Historic Places.

== Geography ==
According to the U.S. Census Bureau, the county has a total area of 767 square miles (1,990 km^{2}), of which 756 square miles (1,960 km^{2}) is land and 11 square miles (28 km^{2}) (1.5%) is water. Its northern border is the Missouri River where it is increased by the confluence of the Grand River.

=== Adjacent counties ===
- Carroll County (northwest)
- Chariton County (northeast)
- Howard County (east)
- Cooper County (southeast)
- Pettis County (south)
- Lafayette County (west)

=== Major highways ===
- Interstate 70
- U.S. Route 40
- U.S. Route 65
- Route 20
- Route 41
- Route 127
- Route 240

=== National protected area ===
- Big Muddy National Fish and Wildlife Refuge (part)

== Demographics ==
The largely rural county reached its peak of population in 1930, and has slowly declined since then since mechanization of farming has meant that fewer workers are needed; from about 1910 to the 1970s, African Americans often moved to larger urban areas for work and better social conditions.

Historical population
Census	Pop.	Note	%±
1830	2,873		—
1840	5,258		83.0%
1850	8,843		68.2%
1860	14,699		66.2%
1870	21,672		47.4%
1880	29,911		38.0%
1890	33,762		12.9%
1900	33,703		−0.2%
1910	29,448		−12.6%
1920	28,817		−2.1%
1930	30,598		6.2%
1940	29,416		−3.9%
1950	26,694		−9.3%
1960	25,148		−5.8%
1970	24,633		−2.0%
1980	24,919		1.2%
1990	23,523		−5.6%
2000	23,756		1.0%
2010	23,370		−1.6%
2020	23,333		−0.2%
2025 (est.)	23,265	▼	−0.3%
U.S. Decennial Census; 1790-1960 1900-1990; 1990-2000 2010

=== 2020 census ===
As of the 2020 census, the county had a population of 23,333. The median age was 36.9 years. 22.3% of residents were under the age of 18 and 17.4% of residents were 65 years of age or older. For every 100 females there were 101.0 males, and for every 100 females age 18 and over there were 100.7 males age 18 and over.

The racial makeup of the county was 77.1% White, 5.0% Black or African American, 0.4% American Indian and Alaska Native, 0.8% Asian, 1.8% Native Hawaiian and Pacific Islander, 8.0% from some other race, and 6.9% from two or more races. Hispanic or Latino residents of any race comprised 12.1% of the population. A more detailed non-Hispanic breakdown appears in the table below.

57.7% of residents lived in urban areas, while 42.3% lived in rural areas.

There were 8,469 households in the county, of which 31.0% had children under the age of 18 living with them and 25.9% had a female householder with no spouse or partner present. About 28.2% of all households were made up of individuals and 13.2% had someone living alone who was 65 years of age or older.

There were 9,836 housing units, of which 13.9% were vacant. Among occupied housing units, 67.6% were owner-occupied and 32.4% were renter-occupied. The homeowner vacancy rate was 3.0% and the rental vacancy rate was 10.4%.

Saline County, Missouri – Racial and ethnic composition Note: the US Census treats Hispanic/Latino as an ethnic category. This table excludes Latinos from the racial categories and assigns them to a separate category. Hispanics/Latinos may be of any race.
Race / Ethnicity (NH = Non-Hispanic)	Pop 1980	Pop 1990	Pop 2000	Pop 2010	Pop 2020	% 1980	% 1990	% 2000	% 2010	% 2020
White alone (NH)	23,455	21,862	20,923	19,441	17,473	94.12%	92.94%	88.07%	83.19%	74.89%
Black or African American alone (NH)	1,235	1,342	1,268	1,217	1,149	4.96%	5.71%	5.34%	5.21%	4.92%
Native American or Alaska Native alone (NH)	31	45	47	49	68	0.12%	0.19%	0.20%	0.21%	0.29%
Asian alone (NH)	48	55	82	123	175	0.19%	0.23%	0.35%	0.53%	0.75%
Native Hawaiian or Pacific Islander alone (NH)	x	x	49	152	397	x	x	0.21%	0.65%	1.70%
Other race alone (NH)	13	11	14	21	233	0.05%	0.05%	0.06%	0.09%	1.00%
Mixed race or Multiracial (NH)	x	x	323	442	1,008	x	x	1.36%	1.89%	4.32%
Hispanic or Latino (any race)	137	208	1,050	1,925	2,830	0.55%	0.88%	4.42%	8.24%	12.13%
Total	24,919	23,523	23,756	23,370	23,333	100.00%	100.00%	100.00%	100.00%	100.00%

=== 2000 census ===
At the 2000 census, there were 23,756 people, 9,015 households and 6,013 families residing in the county. The population density was 31 people per square mile (12 people/km^{2}). There were 10,019 housing units at an average density of 13 units per square mile (5.0/km^{2}). The racial makeup of the county was 90.03% White, 5.39% Black or African American, 0.31% Native American, 0.35% Asian, 0.21% Pacific Islander, 2.09% from other races, and 1.62% from two or more races. Approximately 4.42% of the population were Hispanic or Latino of any race. 28.7% were of German, 18.2% American, 9.8% English and 9.3% Irish ancestry.

There were 9,015 households, of which 30.60% had children under the age of 18 living with them, 51.90% were married couples living together, 10.30% had a female householder with no husband present, and 33.30% were non-families. 28.20% of all households were made up of individuals, and 14.60% had someone living alone who was 65 years of age or older. The average household size was 2.45 and the average family size was 2.97.

In Age distribution was 24.30% under the age of 18, 12.00% from 18 to 24, 25.20% from 25 to 44, 22.30% from 45 to 64, and 16.30% who were 65 years of age or older. The median age was 37 years. For every 100 females there were 96.10 males. For every 100 females age 18 and over, there were 93.70 males.

The median household income was $32,743, and the median family income was $39,234. Males had a median income of $27,180 versus $19,431 for females. The per capita income for the county was $16,132. About 10.50% of families and 13.20% of the population were below the poverty line, including 18.90% of those under age 18 and 8.60% of those age 65 or over.

== Education ==
=== Public schools ===
K-12 school districts include:

- Glasgow School District
- Malta Bend R-V School District – Malta Bend
  - Malta Bend Elementary School (PK-05)
  - Malta Bend High School (06-12)
- Marshall School District – Marshall
  - Eastwood Elementary School (PK-03)
  - Benton Elementary School (K-01)
  - Northwest Elementary School (K-04)
  - Southeast Elementary School (K-02)
  - Bueker Middle School (05-08)
  - Marshall High School (09-12)
- Pettis County R-V School District
- Santa Fe R-X School District
- Slater Public Schools – Slater
  - Slater Elementary School (PK-08)
  - Slater High School (09-12)
- Sweet Springs R-VII School District – Sweet Springs
  - Sweet Springs Elementary School (PK-06)
  - Sweet Springs High School (07-12)

Elementary-only school districts include:

- Blackwater R-II School District
- Gilliam C-4 School District – Gilliam
  - Gilliam Elementary School (K-08)
- Hardeman R-X School District – Marshall
  - Hardeman Elementary School (PK-08)
- Miami R-I School District
- Orearville R-IV School District – Orearville (Slater postal address)
  - Orearville Elementary School (K-08)

=== Private schools ===
- Calvary Baptist School – Marshall (PK-10) – Baptist (Alternative School)
- St. Peter Catholic School – Marshall (K-09) – Roman Catholic

=== Post-secondary ===
- Missouri Valley University – Marshall – A private, four-year Presbyterian university.

Metropolitan Community College has the Santa Fe school district area in its out of district service area, but not its in-district taxation area.

=== Public libraries ===
- Marshall Public Library
- Slater Public Library
- Sweet Springs Public Library

== Communities ==
=== Cities ===
- Blackburn (small part in Lafayette County)
- Emma (partly in Lafayette County)
- Malta Bend
- Marshall (county seat)
- Miami
- Nelson
- Slater
- Sweet Springs

=== Villages ===
- Arrow Rock
- Gilliam
- Grand Pass
- Mount Leonard

=== Unincorporated communities ===
- Blue Lick
- Elmwood
- Fairville
- Hardeman
- Herndon
- Marshall Junction
- McAllister Springs
- Napton
- New Frankfort
- Norton
- Orearville
- Pennytown
- Ridge Prairie
- Saline City
- Salt Springs
- Shackleford
- Sharon

== Government and politics ==
=== Local ===
The Democratic Party predominantly controls politics at the local level in Saline County. Democrats hold all but six of the elected positions in the county.

Saline County, Missouri

Elected countywide officials
Assessor	Jessica Adcock Goodman	Republican
Auditor	Karlin Breshears	Republican
Circuit Clerk	Rebecca Uhlich	Democratic
County Clerk	Brittni Allison Burton	Republican
Collector	Cindi A. Sims	Republican
Commissioner (presiding)	Becky Plattner	Democratic
Commissioner (district 1)	Stephanie Gooden	Republican
Commissioner (district 2)	Monte Fenner	Democratic
Coroner	William “Willie” Harlow	Independent
Prosecuting Attorney	Tim Thompson	Republican
Public Administrator	Paula J. Barr	Democratic
Recorder	Jessica L. Baker	Republican
Sheriff	Daniel Kirchhoff	Republican
Treasurer	Jared Brewer	Republican

=== State ===
==== Gubernatorial ====
Past Gubernatorial Elections Results
Year	Republican	Democratic	Third Parties
2024	69.67% 6,433	28.06% 2,591	2.27% 210
2020	67.86% 6,443	29.83% 2,832	2.31% 219
2016	53.01% 4,901	43.30% 4,004	3.69% 341
2012	38.46% 3,489	58.15% 5,275	3.38% 307
2008	32.80% 3,195	56.87% 5,540	10.34% 1,007
2004	47.46% 4,691	51.30% 5,071	1.24% 123
2000	42.23% 3,945	56.14% 5,245	1.63% 152
1996	26.11% 2,315	71.45% 6,334	2.44% 216

==== Missouri House of Representatives ====
Saline County is divided into two legislative districts in the Missouri House of Representatives, both represented by Republicans.

- District 48 — Dave Muntzel (R-Boonville). Consists of the communities of Arrow Rock, Gilliam, Miami, Nelson, and Slater.

Missouri House of Representatives — District 48 — Saline County (2016)
Party	Candidate	Votes	%	±%
Republican	Dave Muntzel	1,588	76.02%	−23.98
Independent	Debra Dilks	501	23.98%	+23.98

Missouri House of Representatives — District 48 — Saline County (2014)
Party	Candidate	Votes	%	±%
Republican	Dave Muntzel	1,021	100.00%	+52.21

Missouri House of Representatives — District 48 — Saline County (2012)
Party	Candidate	Votes	%	±%
Republican	Dave Muntzel	1,036	47.79%	
Democratic	Ron Monnig	1,132	52.21%	

- District 51 — Dean Dohrman (R-La Monte). Consists of the communities of Blackburn, Emma, Grand Pass, Malta Bend, Marshall, Mt. Leonard, and Sweet Springs.

Missouri House of Representatives — District 51 — Saline County (2016)
Party	Candidate	Votes	%	±%
Republican	Dean Dohrman	4,590	67.64%	+12.69
Democratic	John Cozort	2,196	32.36%	−7.87

Missouri House of Representatives — District 51 — Saline County (2014)
Party	Candidate	Votes	%	±%
Republican	Dean Dohrman	2,154	54.95%	+10.44
Democratic	Gary L. Grigsby	1,577	40.23%	−12.07
Libertarian	Bill Wayne	189	4.82%	+1.63

Missouri House of Representatives — District 51 — Saline County (2012)
Party	Candidate	Votes	%	±%
Republican	Dean Dohrman	2,913	44.51%	
Democratic	Gary L. Grigsby	3,423	52.30%	
Libertarian	Bill Wayne	209	3.19%	

==== Missouri Senate ====
All of Saline County is a part of Missouri's 21st District in the Missouri Senate and is currently represented by Denny Hoskins (R-Warrensburg).

Missouri Senate — District 21 — Saline County (2016)
Party	Candidate	Votes	%	±%
Republican	Denny Hoskins	5,564	62.57%	+6.35
Democratic	ElGene Ver Dught	2,758	31.02%	−7.91
Libertarian	Bill Wayne	570	6.41%	+1.56

Missouri Senate — District 21 — Saline County (2012)
Party	Candidate	Votes	%	±%
Republican	David Pearce	4,911	56.22%	
Democratic	ElGene Ver Dught	3,401	38.93%	
Libertarian	Steven Hedrick	424	4.85%	

=== Federal ===
==== US Senate ====
U.S. Senate — Missouri — Saline County (2016)
Party	Candidate	Votes	%	±%
Republican	Roy Blunt	4,613	49.92%	+15.29
Democratic	Jason Kander	4,061	43.94%	−13.13
Libertarian	Jonathan Dine	295	3.19%	−5.11
Green	Johnathan McFarland	142	1.54%	+1.54
Constitution	Fred Ryman	130	1.41%	+1.41

U.S. Senate — Missouri — Saline County (2012)
Party	Candidate	Votes	%	±%
Republican	Todd Akin	3,121	34.63%	
Democratic	Claire McCaskill	5,143	57.07%	
Libertarian	Jonathan Dine	748	8.30%	

==== US House of Representatives ====
All of Saline County is included in Missouri's 5th Congressional District, which is represented by Emanuel Cleaver (D-Kansas City) in the U.S. House of Representatives.

U.S. House of Representatives — Missouri’s 5th Congressional District — Saline County (2016)
Party	Candidate	Votes	%	±%
Democratic	Emanuel Cleaver II	3,824	41.83%	+4.69
Republican	Jacob Turk	4,967	54.34%	−4.85
Libertarian	Roy Welborn	350	3.83%	+0.16

U.S. House of Representatives — Missouri's 5th Congressional District — Saline County (2014)
Party	Candidate	Votes	%	±%
Democratic	Emanuel Cleaver II	1,942	37.14%	−12.50
Republican	Jacob Turk	3,095	59.19%	+12.42
Libertarian	Roy Welborn	192	3.67%	+0.08

U.S. House of Representatives — Missouri's 5th Congressional District — Saline County (2012)
Party	Candidate	Votes	%	±%
Democratic	Emanuel Cleaver II	4,439	49.64%	
Republican	Jacob Turk	4,183	46.77%	
Libertarian	Randy Langkraehr	321	3.59%	

==== Presidential ====
United States presidential election results for Saline County, Missouri
Year	Republican		Democratic		Third party(ies)	
Year	No.	%	No.	%	No.	%
1888	2,684	36.65%	4,386	59.89%	253	3.45%
1892	2,622	33.31%	4,565	57.99%	685	8.70%
1896	3,050	34.85%	5,615	64.16%	87	0.99%
1900	2,814	35.91%	4,901	62.54%	121	1.54%
1904	2,805	42.08%	3,710	55.66%	151	2.27%
1908	2,926	40.73%	4,189	58.31%	69	0.96%
1912	1,443	20.94%	3,929	57.01%	1,520	22.05%
1916	2,966	39.21%	4,503	59.53%	95	1.26%
1920	5,613	43.81%	7,114	55.53%	85	0.66%
1924	4,990	41.15%	6,564	54.14%	571	4.71%
1928	6,780	51.98%	6,251	47.92%	13	0.10%
1932	3,783	30.89%	8,389	68.51%	73	0.60%
1936	6,108	41.34%	8,622	58.35%	46	0.31%
1940	7,336	47.79%	7,988	52.03%	28	0.18%
1944	6,022	47.22%	6,715	52.65%	16	0.13%
1948	4,822	40.09%	7,185	59.73%	22	0.18%
1952	6,926	52.19%	6,318	47.61%	27	0.20%
1956	5,970	50.55%	5,841	49.45%	0	0.00%
1960	6,085	50.48%	5,969	49.52%	0	0.00%
1964	3,635	33.22%	7,308	66.78%	0	0.00%
1968	4,698	46.76%	4,646	46.24%	704	7.01%
1972	6,641	65.75%	3,460	34.25%	0	0.00%
1976	4,883	45.03%	5,890	54.31%	72	0.66%
1980	5,218	49.34%	4,943	46.74%	415	3.92%
1984	6,042	58.53%	4,281	41.47%	0	0.00%
1988	4,625	47.70%	5,039	51.97%	32	0.33%
1992	2,688	26.44%	4,643	45.67%	2,835	27.89%
1996	2,931	33.10%	4,765	53.82%	1,158	13.08%
2000	4,572	48.87%	4,585	49.01%	198	2.12%
2004	5,389	54.22%	4,479	45.06%	71	0.71%
2008	4,962	50.39%	4,712	47.85%	174	1.77%
2012	5,104	56.04%	3,790	41.61%	214	2.35%
2016	5,977	64.45%	2,789	30.07%	508	5.48%
2020	6,451	67.77%	2,904	30.51%	164	1.72%
2024	6,498	69.65%	2,726	29.22%	106	1.14%

== See also ==
- National Register of Historic Places listings in Saline County, Missouri
