= List of bridges on the National Register of Historic Places in Missouri =

This is a list of bridges and tunnels on the National Register of Historic Places in the U.S. state of Missouri.

Name	Image	Built	Listed	Location	County	Type
Arrow Rock State Historic Site Bridge		ca. 1937	1985-03-04	Arrow Rock; 39°4′6″N 92°56′39″W	Saline	
Barretts Tunnels		1851, 1853	1978-12-08	Kirkwood; 38°34′21″N 90°27′18″W	St. Louis	
Boeckman Bridge		1926	1979-03-19	St. Elizabeth; 38°13′35″N 92°14′23″W	Miller	
Brownville Bridge		1939	1993-06-17	Phelps City; 40°23′57″N 95°39′6″W	Atchison	
Burfordville Covered Bridge		1858	1970-05-19	Burfordville; 37°22′2″N 89°48′9″W	Cape Girardeau	Howe truss
Chain of Rocks Bridge		1929, 1936	2006-12-01	St. Louis	St. Louis City	Warrant Truss
Crowder State Park Vehicle Bridge		ca. 1939	1985-03-04	Trenton; 40°5′31″N 93°39′51″W	Grundy	Rustic arch
Eads Bridge		1867, 1874	1966-10-15	St. Louis; 38°37′45″N 90°11′8″W	St. Louis City	Cantilever deck arch
Grand Auglaize Bridge		1931	2020-10-08	vic. of Brumley	Miller	A suspension and swinging bridge designed and built by Dice.
Hargrove Pivot Bridge		1917	1985-10-15	Poplar Bluff; 36°38′50″N 90°18′0″W	Butler	Wichert and Warren Truss
Jefferson Street Footbridge		1902	2003-09-02	Springfield; 37°13′58″N 93°17′21″W	Greene	Cantilever Through Truss
Locust Creek Covered Bridge	Locust Creek Covered Bridge	1868	1970-05-19	Laclede; 39°47′30″N 93°14′3″W	Linn	
Meramec River U.S. 66 Bridge - J421		1931, 1932	2009-9-16	Eureka; 38°30′20″N 90°35′31.19″W	St. Louis	Warren deck truss
Montserrat Recreation Demonstration Area Bridge		1937	1985-03-04	Knob Noster; 38°45′13″N 93°34′36″W	Johnson	
Old Appleton Bridge		1879	2009-08-25	Old Appleton; 37°35′51.3″N 89°42′49.7″W	Cape Girardeau	Pratt truss
Papinville Marais des Cygnes River Bridge		1884	2002-10-22	Papinville; 38°4′6″N 94°13′54″W	Bates	Pinned Pratt through truss
Pin Oak Hollow Bridge		1934, 1938	1985-09-13	Pin Oak Hollow; 38°6′50″N 92°36′43″W	Camden	Single-arch
Powell Bridge		1915	2011-4-20	Powell vicinity 36°36′57″N 94°10′56″W	McDonald	Pinned Pratt through truss
Rulo Bridge		1938, 1939	1993-01-04	Fortescue; 40°3′14″N 95°25′14″W	Holt	Pennsylvania through truss
Sandy Creek Covered Bridge		1872	1970-07-08	Hillsboro; 38°17′38″N 90°31′5″W	Jefferson	Howe Truss
Union Covered Bridge		1870, 1871	1970-06-15	Paris; 39°25′58″N 92°6′9″W	Monroe	
Upper Bridge		1928	1999-09-17	Warsaw; 38°14′39″N 93°23′16″W	Benton	
Waddell "A" Truss Bridge	Waddell "A" Truss Bridge	1898, 1980, 1987	1991-01-25	Parkville; 39°11′9″N 94°40′55″W	Platte	Waddell "A" truss
Windsor Harbor Road Bridge		1874, 1875	1983-09-08	Kimmswick; 38°21′50″N 90°21′44″W	Jefferson	
Y Bridge		1926, 1927	1991-05-23	Galena; 36°48′18″N 93°27′41″W	Stone	Open spandrel arch Y bridge
Swan Creek Bridge		1914, 1932	1983-09-08 removed 1994-12-19	Forsyth; 36°42′2″N 93°5′8″W	Taney	
