= List of covered bridges in Missouri =

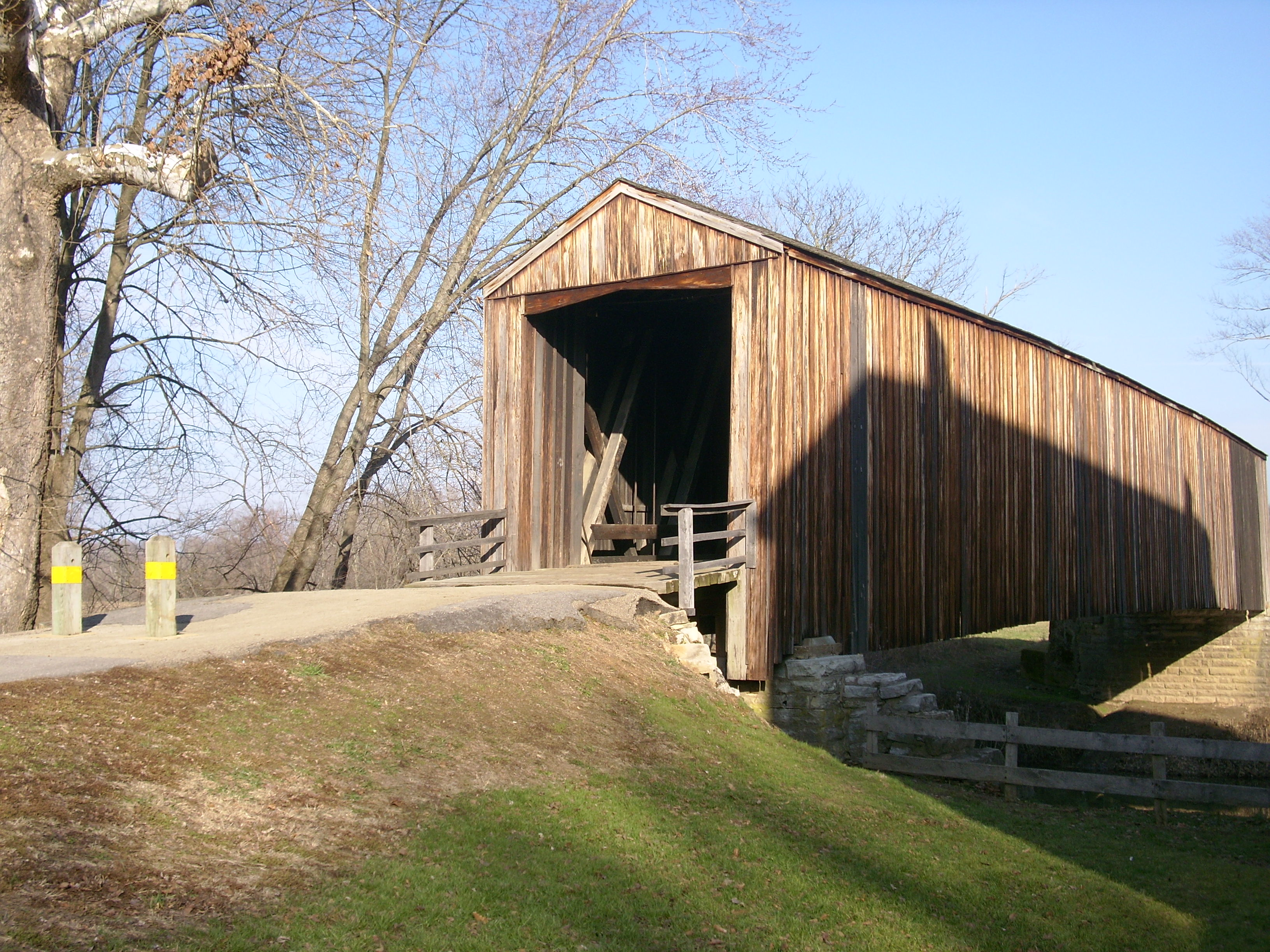
Burfordville covered bridge

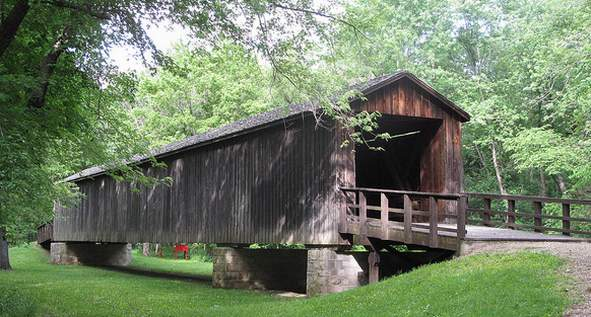
Locust Creek covered bridge

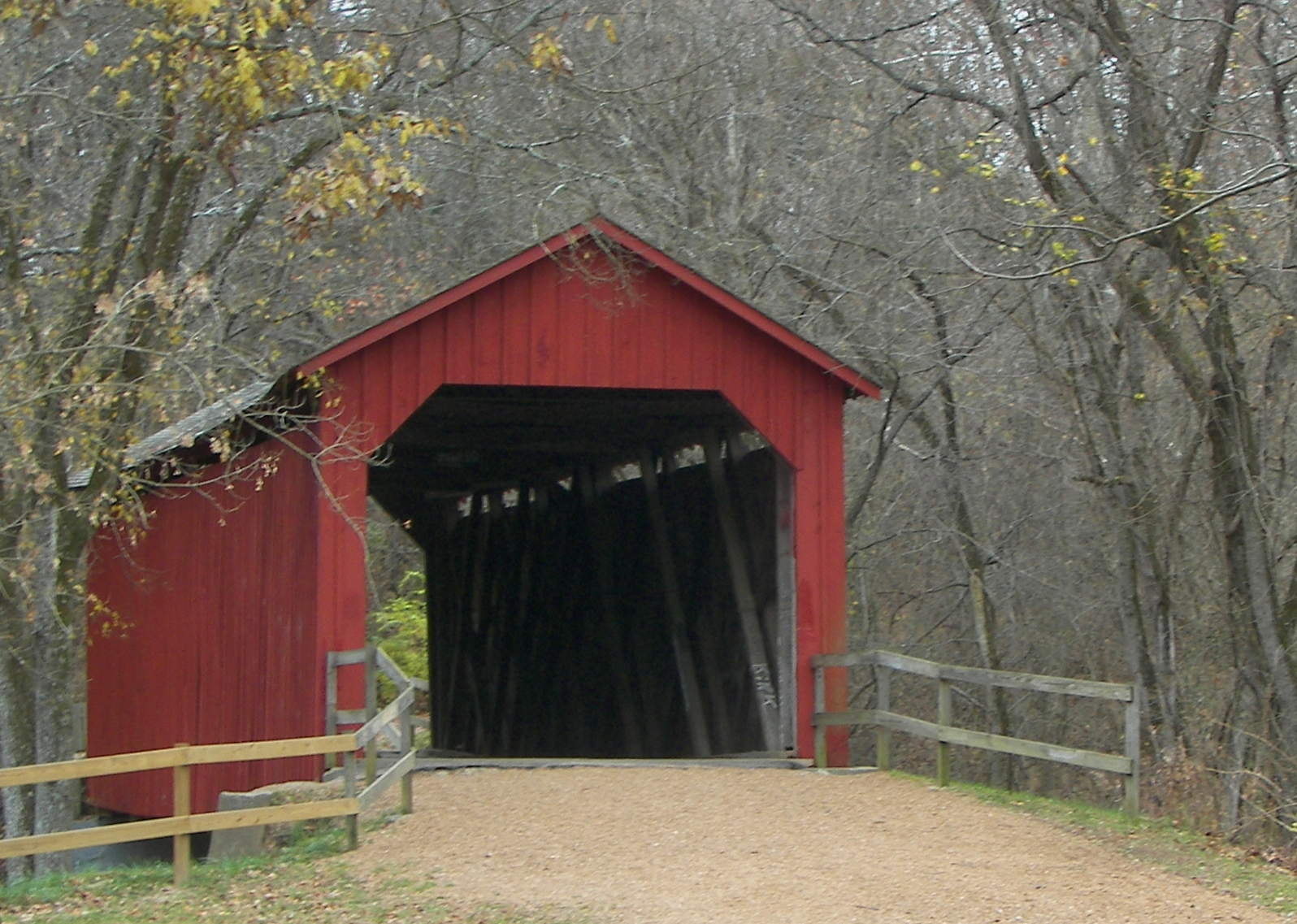
Sandy Creek covered bridge

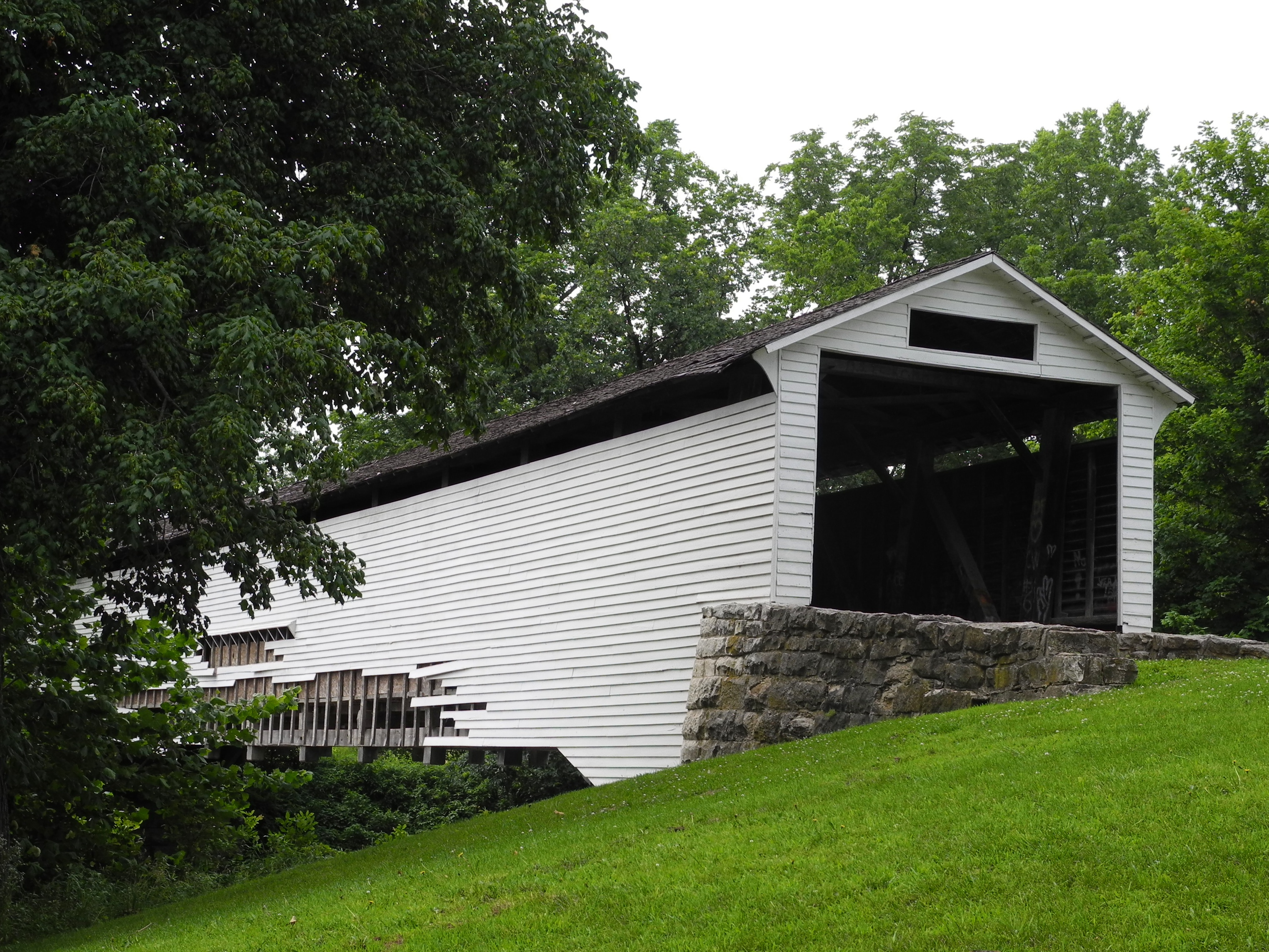
Union covered bridge

This is a list of Missouri covered bridges. There are four historic wooden covered bridges in Missouri, all now listed as State Historic Sites and under the protection of the Missouri Department of Natural Resources.

State officials estimate that Missouri had about thirty covered bridges from the 1820s through the end of the 19th century. On May 25, 1967, the state legislature authorized the Missouri State Park Board to take possession of the remaining bridges in order to repair and preserve them. At the time, five covered bridges remained, but the Mexico covered bridge was destroyed in a flood later that year.

Name	Location	Year built	Length	Crosses	Design	Notes
Burfordville Covered Bridge	Burfordville in Cape Girardeau County	1858	140 feet (43 m)	Whitewater River	Howe truss	Part of the Bollinger Mill State Historic Site; restored in 1971 and repaired again in 1998.
Locust Creek Covered Bridge	Linn County	1868	151 feet (46 m)	Dry channel, Locust Creek	Howe truss	Carried the original Route 8; no longer has a stream under it.
Sandy Creek Covered Bridge	Jefferson County	1872	76 feet (23 m)	Sandy Creek	Howe truss	Rebuilt in 1884 after flood damage. Restored in 1984.
Union Covered Bridge	Monroe County, west of Paris	1871	125 feet (38 m)	Elk Fork, Salt River	Burr truss	Restored in 1968 with timbers from the Mexico covered bridge that had recently been destroyed by a flood; restored again in 1988.
