= Commercial Street Historic District (Springfield, Missouri) =

Historic district in Missouri, United States

- U.S. National Register of Historic Places
- U.S. Historic district
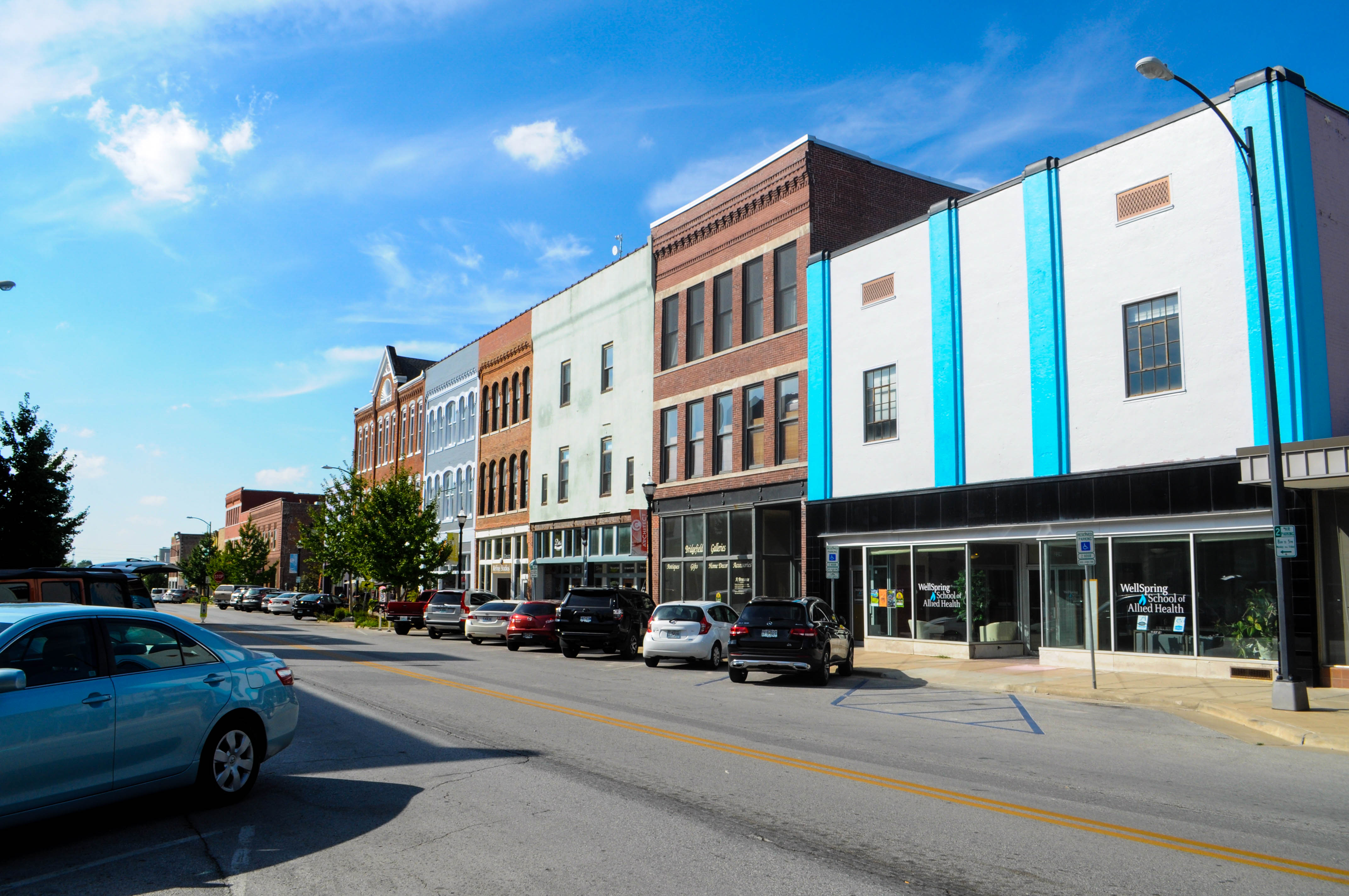

- Location within Missouri Location within the United States
- Location: Commercial St., Springfield, Missouri
- Coordinates: 37°13′47″N 93°17′23″W
- Area: 11 acres (4.5 ha)
- Website: HistoricCstreet.org
- NRHP reference No.: 83000991
- Added to NRHP: May 24, 1983

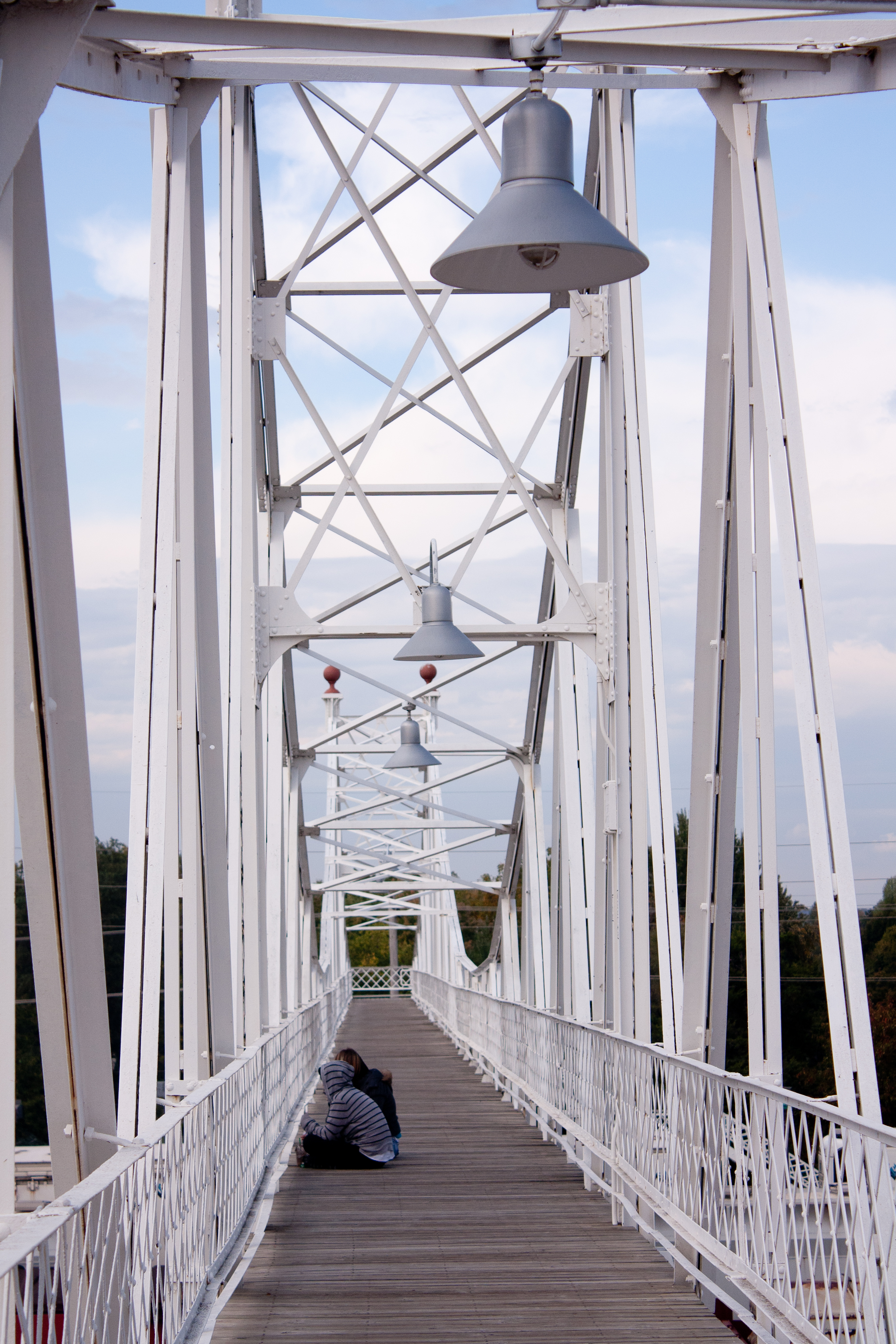
The Jefferson Avenue Footbridge over the railroad tracks is a separately listed historic structure adjacent to the district.

The Commercial Street Historic District is a national historic district located between Washington Ave. and Grant Ave. in Springfield, Missouri, United States. The district encompasses 57 contributing buildings in Springfield's central business district. The district developed between about 1870 and 1935, and it includes representative examples of Romanesque Revival and Victorian style architecture. Notable buildings include the Thos. Murray Building (1908), Fire Station No. 2 (1904), Perkins Hotel (1902–1908), Bank of Springfield (c. 1884), Bakers' Union Hall (1908), Uncle Carl Haden’s Pawn Shop (1902–1910), and Commercial Club (c. 192–1928). It was added to the National Register of Historic Places in 1983.

The six-block district is designated by the Environmental Protection Agency as a brownfield land. Key components of the revitalization will include improved stormwater management, use of alternative energy sources, and the reduction of the district's carbon footprint. EPA assistance will provide guidance on green infrastructure and green design techniques for several properties in the redevelopment district.
