= Barretts Tunnels =

Tunnels in Missouri, U.S.

- U.S. National Register of Historic Places
- U.S. Historic district
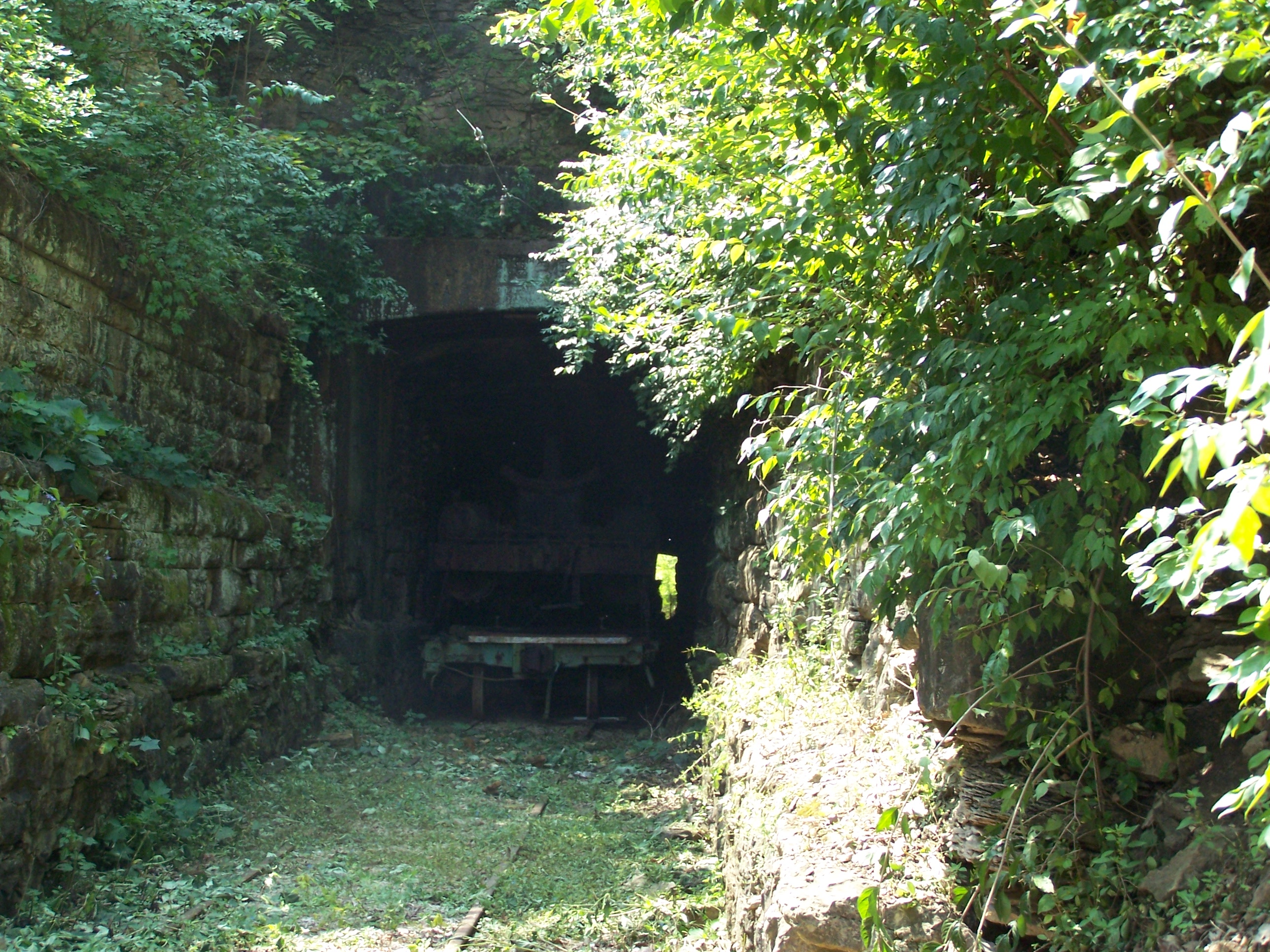

- Location within Missouri Location within the United States
- Nearest city: Kirkwood, Missouri
- Coordinates: 38°34′11″N 90°27′53″W
- Area: 0.5 acres (0.20 ha)
- Built: 1851
- Engineer: James P. Kirkwood
- NRHP reference No.: 78003138
- Added to NRHP: December 8, 1978

The Barretts Tunnels are a pair of railroad tunnels in St. Louis County, Missouri, the first ones built west of the Mississippi River. They were built by the Pacific Railroad in 1853.

The tunnels were added to the National Register of Historic Places in 1977.

== See also ==
- National Register of Historic Places listings in St. Louis County, Missouri
- List of bridges on the National Register of Historic Places in Missouri
