= Union Covered Bridge State Historic Site =

Crossing over the Salt River in Missouri

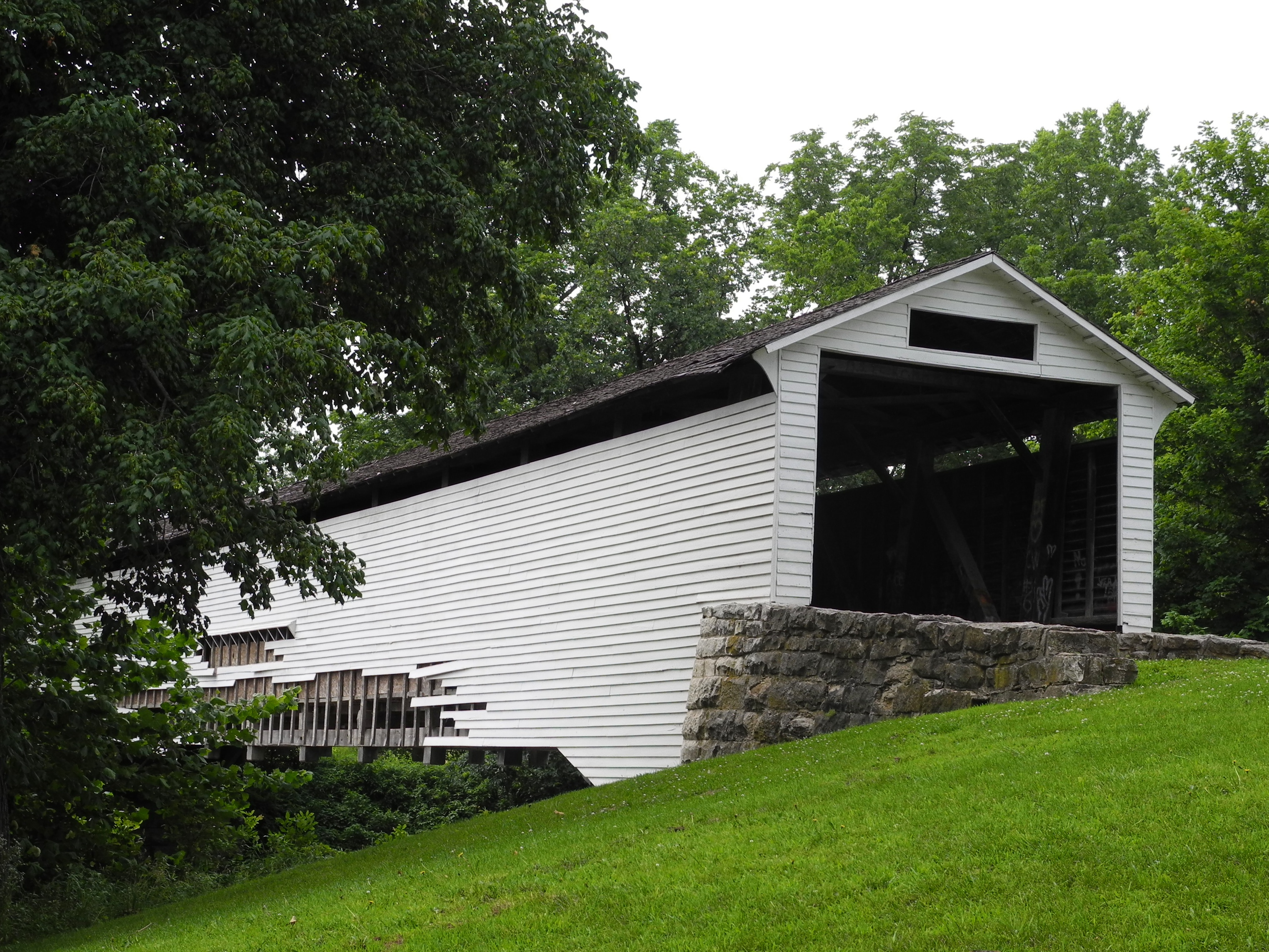

- Location within Missouri Location within the United States
- Location: Monroe County, Missouri, United States
- Coordinates: 39°25′58″N 92°06′09″W
- Area: 1.24 acres (0.50 ha)
- Elevation: 676 ft (206 m)
- Established: 1967
- Visitors: 22,118 (in 2022)
- Governing body: Missouri Department of Natural Resources
- Website: Union Covered Bridge State Historic Site
- Union Covered Bridge
- U.S. National Register of Historic Places
- Nearest city: Paris, Missouri
- Built: 1870
- Built by: Elliot, Joseph
- NRHP reference No.: 70000342
- Added to NRHP: June 15, 1970

The Union Covered Bridge State Historic Site is a Missouri State Historic Site in Monroe County, Missouri. The covered bridge is a Burr-arch truss structure built in 1871 over the Elk Fork of the Salt River. It was almost lost to neglect in the 1960s, but was added to the state park system in 1967, the same year it was damaged by a flood. Repairs were made the next year, using timbers salvaged from another covered bridge that had been destroyed by the same flood. In 1970, it was closed to vehicular traffic and was added to the National Register of Historic Places. Further repairs were made in 1988, and it survived the Great Flood of 1993, only to be damaged by another flood in 2008 and later re-repaired. It is about 120 feet (37 m) or 125 feet (38 m) long, 12 feet (3.7 m) high, and 17.5 feet (5.3 m) wide.

== History ==
The Monroe County government gave permission for bridge construction over the Elk Fork of the Salt River on April 8, 1870, after two previous bridges at the site had failed. Union Covered Bridge, named after the nearby Union Church, was then constructed in 1871 using locally sourced oak wood, opening on September 17. It is about 120 feet (37 m) or 125 feet (38 m) long with a height of 12 feet (3.7 m) and width of 17.5 feet (5.3 m) and was originally on the road between Paris and Fayette. Joseph Elliott was the builder. Construction originally cost $5,500 (equivalent to $147,813 in 2025).

Locals raised $1,000 (equivalent to $10,774 in 2025) to preserve the bridge in 1961, but in the late 1960s, the bridge was almost a victim of neglect. In 1967, the bridge was damaged by a flood, with parts of the bridge's siding being swept away. Earlier that year, the Missouri General Assembly had passed a law to bring all remaining covered bridges into the state into the state parks system. It was later repaired using salvaged timbers from the Mexico Covered Bridge, which had been destroyed in the same flood. Further restoration occurred in 1968, at a cost of $25,000 (equivalent to $231,459 in 2025). It was closed to vehicular traffic in 1970 after it was damaged, likely by a truck bearing a heavy load that had detoured away from a low-water crossing. The bridge was listed on the National Register of Historic Places on June 15, 1970. Repairs were made in 1988, and it survived flooding during the Great Flood of 1993.

A flood in 2008 damaged the bridge, with parts of the bridge's structure being knocked loose. In 2011, the state of Missouri received $145,000 from the federal government to repair 2008 flood damage at Union Covered Bridge and to do work at the Sandy Creek Covered Bridge. Restoration was completed in 2019. The site is sometimes used for weddings and baptisms. Site management is provided by Mark Twain State Park. The state historic site covers 1.24 acres (0.50 ha) and contains 0.2 miles (0.32 km) of roadway. In 2020, it was visited by 30,570 people and had a budget of $4,680.

== Design ==
The Union Covered Bridge is the only Burr-arch truss covered bridge still extant in Missouri; the other three covered bridges remaining in Missouri are examples of the Howe truss. The Burr design uses multiple king posts and an arch to support the bridge's truss. The Union Covered Bridge specifically has two arches on either side of the bridge. The design is slightly bowed to the upstream, which helps stabilize it in flood conditions. The bridge has been described as barn-like, and local legend claims that the appearance helped farm animals be more willing to cross it. In 1995, the interior was reported to be covered in graffiti. The components of the bridge are mainly held together with treenails, with only a few iron fasteners for additional support. The roof is covered with wood shingles. The bridge is oriented east-west.
