= Kinder Township, Cape Girardeau County, Missouri =

Township in the US state of Missouri

Kinder Township
- Township
- Coordinates: 37°21′23″N 089°48′50″W
- Country: United States
- State: Missouri
- County: Cape Girardeau

Area
  - Total: 32.14 sq mi (83.23 km^{2})
  - Land: 32.10 sq mi (83.14 km^{2})
  - Water: 0.035 sq mi (0.09 km^{2}) 0.11%
- Elevation: 520 ft (160 m)

Population (2000)
  - Total: 999
  - Density: 31/sq mi (12/km^{2})
- FIPS code: 29-38702
- GNIS feature ID: 0766399

Kinder Township is one of ten townships in Cape Girardeau County, Missouri, USA. As of the 2000 census, its population was 999. It contains the census-designated place of Burfordville.

== History ==
Kinder Township was founded in 1872. The township has the name of the Kinder family, early settlers.

== Geography ==
Kinder Township covers an area of 32.13 square miles (83.2 km^{2}) and contains no incorporated settlements. Known cemeteries include Allen, Braugkmann, Calvary, Cauvey, Deck, Fairview, Gravel Hill 1, Gravel Hill 2, Haynes Chapel, Heuer 2/Foster/Huey, Krueger, McGuire/Helderman, Proffer 2, Proffer 3, Reineke, Schatte, Scriptural Evangelical Lutheran, Stausing.

The streams of Byrd Creek, Dillard Creek, Little Whitewater Creek, McGuire Branch and Schroder Branch run through this township.
