= Sandy Creek (Joachim Creek tributary) =

Stream in the American state of Missouri

Coordinates: 38°15′57″N 90°24′11″W

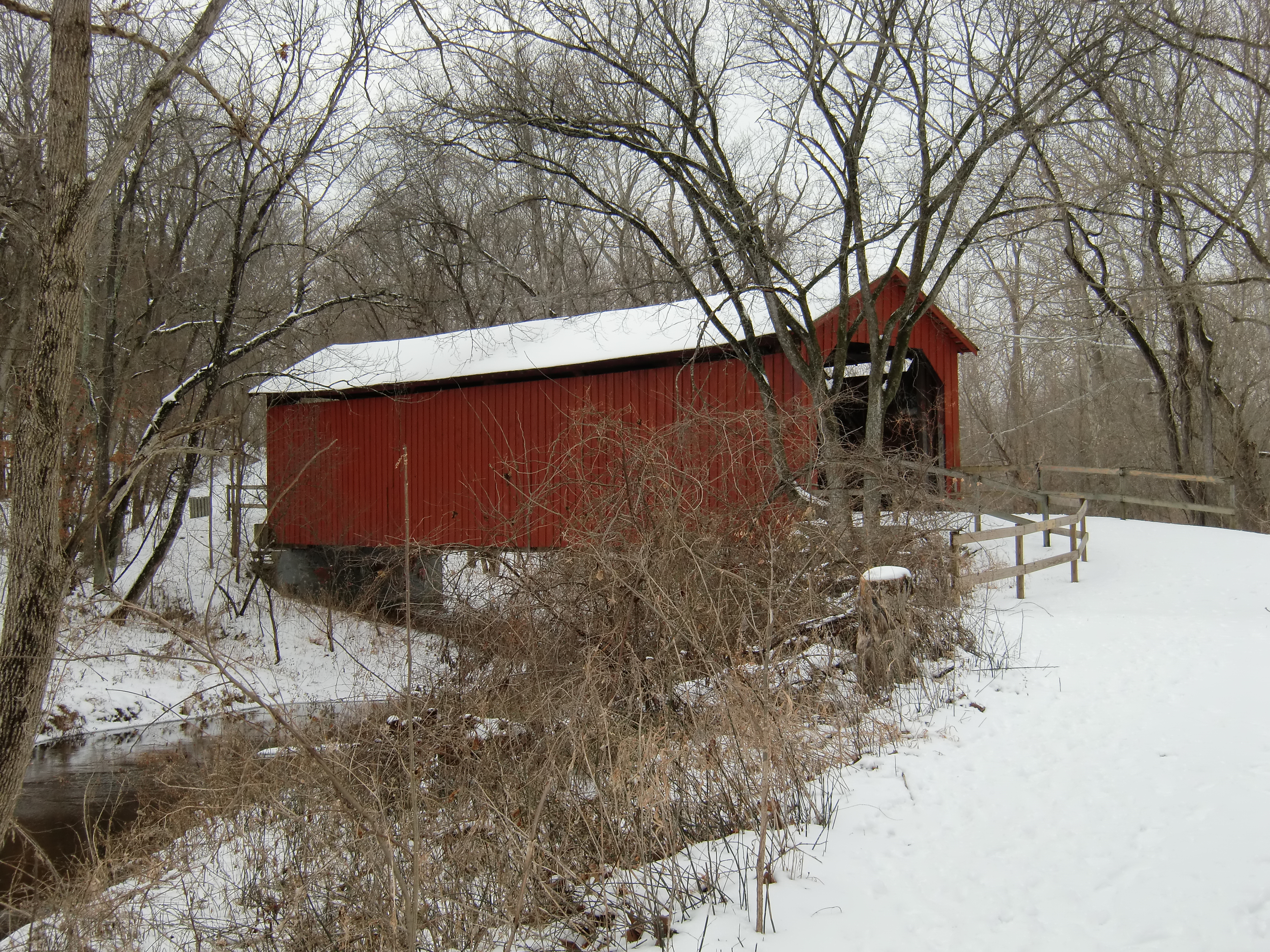
The Sandy Creek Covered Bridge

Sandy Creek is a stream in Jefferson County in the U.S. state of Missouri. It is a tributary of Joachim Creek which it enters just south of Pevely adjacent to I-55. The stream flows through the Sandy Creek Covered Bridge State Historic Site where it is crossed by the Sandy Creek Covered Bridge.

Sandy Creek was named for the sandy character of the creek bed.

== See also ==
- List of rivers of Missouri
