= Bollinger Mill State Historic Site =

Historic site in Missouri, United States

- Bollinger Mill in November 2026

- Location within Missouri Location within the United States
- Location: Burfordville, Cape Girardeau County, Missouri, United States
- Coordinates: 37°22′2″N 89°48′9″W
- Area: 43.85 acres (17.75 ha)
- Established: 1967
- Visitors: 48,900 (in 2022)
- Governing body: Missouri Department of Natural Resources
- Website: Bollinger Mill State Historic Site
- Burfordville Covered Bridge
- U.S. National Register of Historic Places
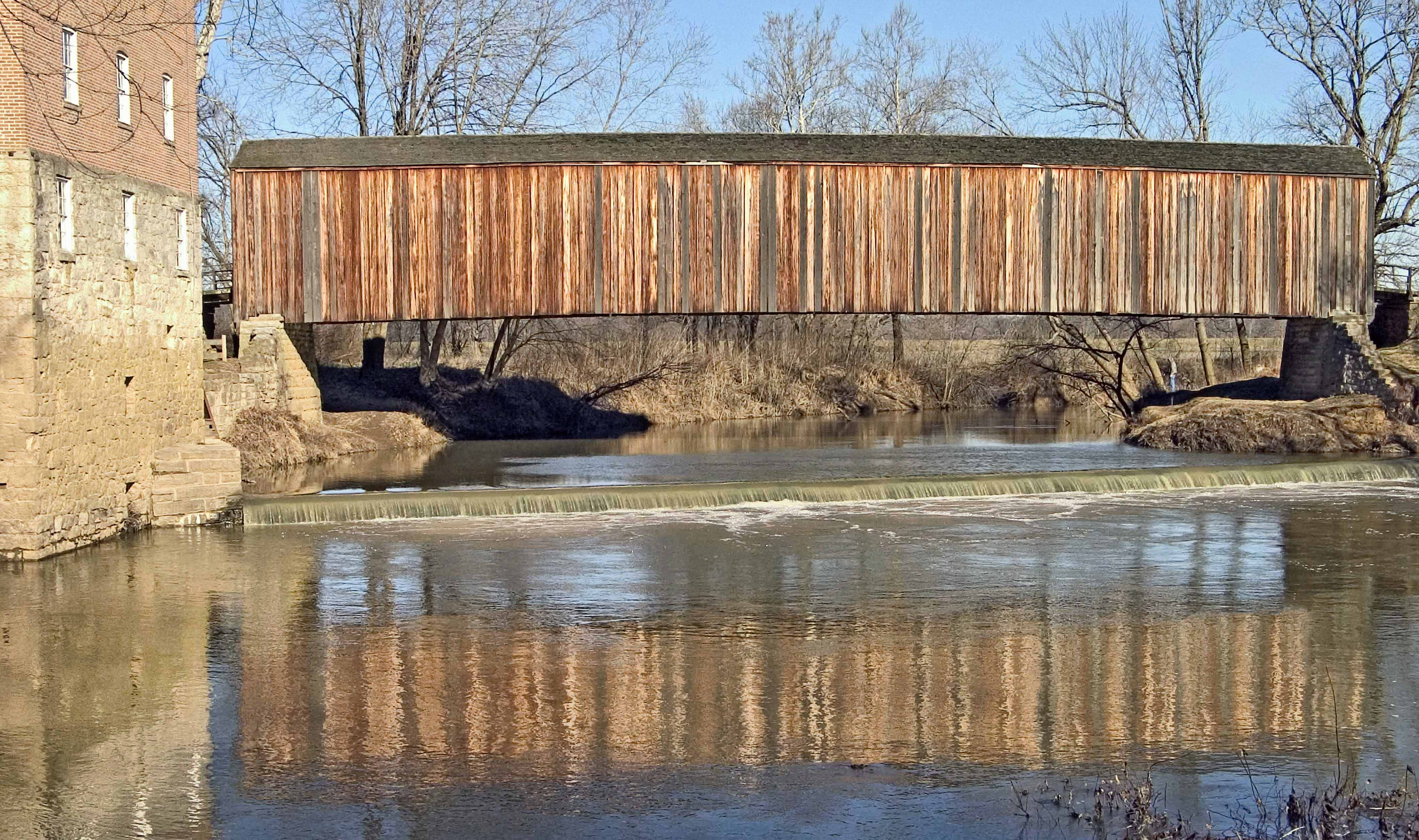
- Built: 1858–1868
- Built by: Joseph Lansmon
- NRHP reference No.: 70000325
- Added to NRHP: May 19, 1970
- Burfordville Mill
- U.S. National Register of Historic Places
- Built: 1825; 1867
- NRHP reference No.: 71000463
- Added to NRHP: May 27, 1971

The Bollinger Mill State Historic Site is a state-owned property preserving a mill and covered bridge that pre-date the American Civil War in Burfordville, Cape Girardeau County, Missouri. The park was established in 1967 and offers mill tours and picnicking. It is managed by the Missouri Department of Natural Resources. It includes the Burfordville Covered Bridge, which is listed on the National Register of Historic Places.

== History ==
=== Mill history ===
In 1797, George Frederick Bollinger received a land grant in Upper Louisiana from the Spanish Government and moved with several other families from North Carolina to what is now Burfordville, Missouri. In 1800, Bollinger began building a log dam and mill on the Whitewater River. In 1825, Bollinger rebuilt the mill and dam using limestone. After Bollinger's death in 1842, his daughter Sarah Daugherty and her sons continued to operate the mill until the Civil War, when the mill was burned by the Union army in order to prevent the supply of flour and meal to the Confederate army. Following the war, the mill site was sold to Solomon R. Burford. The current four-story brick mill was completed by Burford in 1867 and is built upon the limestone foundation of the 1825 building. Burford owned the mill until 1897, when the Cape County Milling Company took over operations and continued operating the mill until 1953 when the mill was sold to the Vandivort family, relatives of George Bollinger. The mill was donated to the Cape Girardeau County Historical Society in 1961 and to the State of Missouri in 1967. It was added to the National Register of Historic Places in 1971.

=== Bridge history ===
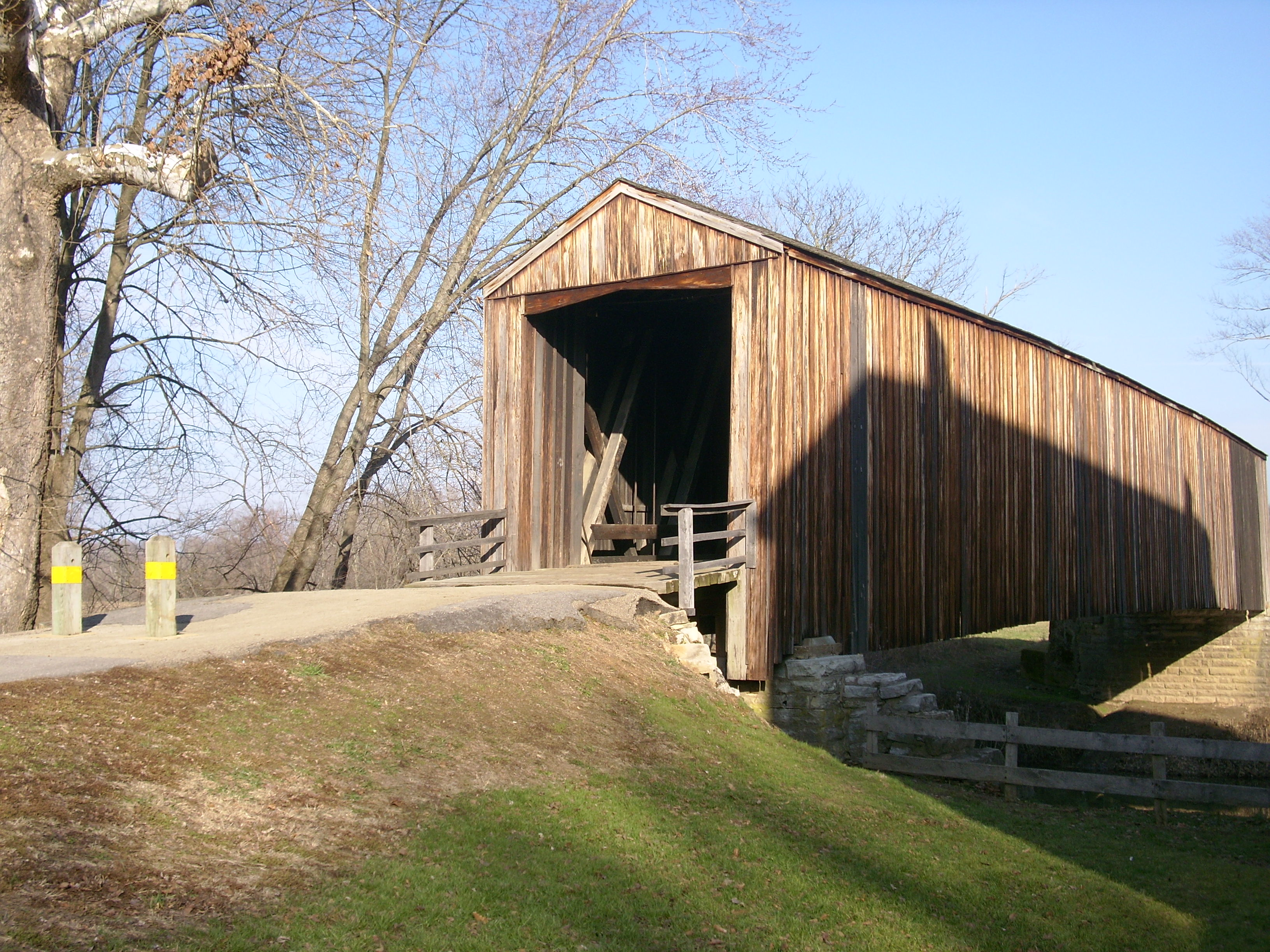
The Burfordville covered bridge is adjacent to the mill and included in the State Historic Site.

Construction began on a bridge over the Whitewater River in 1858, but was delayed several years by the Civil War. In 1868, around the time that Bollinger completed his mill, the town of Burfordville was created and construction was completed on the bridge, making the Burfordville bridge the oldest of the four surviving covered bridges in Missouri. The bridge, built by Cape Girardeau builder Joseph Lansmon as part of the Macadamized Road Company toll road, is 140 feet (43 m) long and 12 feet (3.7 m) wide with a clearance of 14 feet (4.3 m). It is a Howe truss made of locally cut yellow poplar. As part of the toll road, the bridge originally included a toll booth on the east end, which was used until 1906.

Around 1900, the bridge had fallen into disrepair, with some missing siding and a partially collapsed roof. The county spent $390 to repair the bridge in 1908, and it was once again restored in 1950 when a metal roof was added. In 1967, the same year the mill was donated to the state, the Missouri State Park system began maintaining the four remaining covered bridges in the state. The bridge was added to the National Register of Historic Places in 1970, one year before it was restored by the park service, at which time the metal roof was replaced with wooden shingles.

In 1986, the Whitewater River reached record levels, 17 inches over the deck of the bridge, which damaged the bridge and resulted in its closure to both vehicular and pedestrian traffic. The bridge remained closed until 1998 when repairs to lower trusses, support timbers, and vertical iron rods made it possible to reopen the bridge to pedestrian traffic.

== Activities and amenities ==
The mill is open year-round for guided tours. Milling demonstrations using the original milling equipment are performed when water levels in the river allow. In addition to milling demonstrations, the first floor of the mill contains exhibits that describe how the milling process changed over the years. The mill hosts special events during the year including folk music concerts and a display of restored farming equipment. The bridge is open year-round to foot traffic.

== See also ==
- List of Missouri covered bridges
