= Jefferson Avenue Footbridge =

- Jefferson Street Footbridge
- U.S. National Register of Historic Places
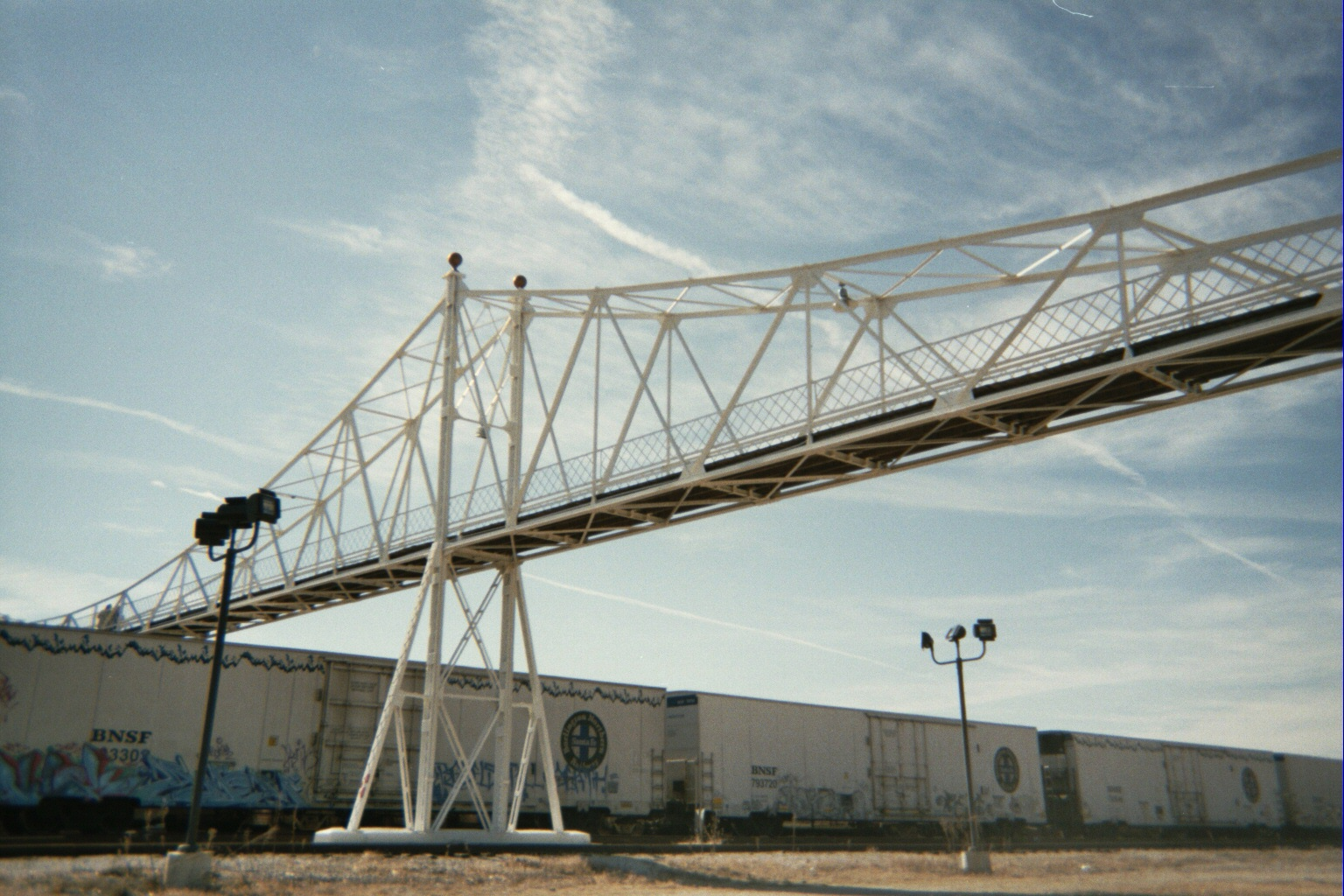
- Jefferson Street Footbridge

- Location within Missouri Location within the United States
- Location: Jefferson Ave., bet. Commercial and Chase Sts., Springfield, Missouri
- Coordinates: 37°13′58″N 93°17′21″W
- Area: less than one acre
- Built by: American Bridge Company
- Engineer: J.W. Hoover
- Architectural style: Cantilever truss
- NRHP reference No.: 03000865
- Added to NRHP: September 2, 2003

Jefferson Avenue Footbridge is a historic footbridge located in Springfield, Missouri, United States. Built in 1902, it measures 562-foot (171 m) long and allows pedestrians to cross 13 sets of railroad tracks.

It was added to the National Register of Historic Places in 2003.

As the footbridge approached its 100th anniversary, it became apparent that a major rehabilitation was required to preserve the aging structure. Springfield City officials partnered with the city's Commercial Club to obtain federal transportation enhancement grants and Community Development Block Grant funding to save the historic footbridge.

In addition to the extensive rehabilitation work on the footbridge, a gathering place plaza was created adjacent to the Commercial Street terminus. The rehabilitation work was conducted between 2001 and 2002 at a cost of over $518,000. Nearly 100 years after the original footbridge was constructed, the rehabilitated structure was reopened to pedestrian traffic and rededicated on April 17, 2002.

The bridge was closed on March 1, 2016. Missouri Governor Mike Parson said on June 30, 2023 that the Jefferson Avenue Footbridge would be repaired and able to walk on around 2024 or 2025.

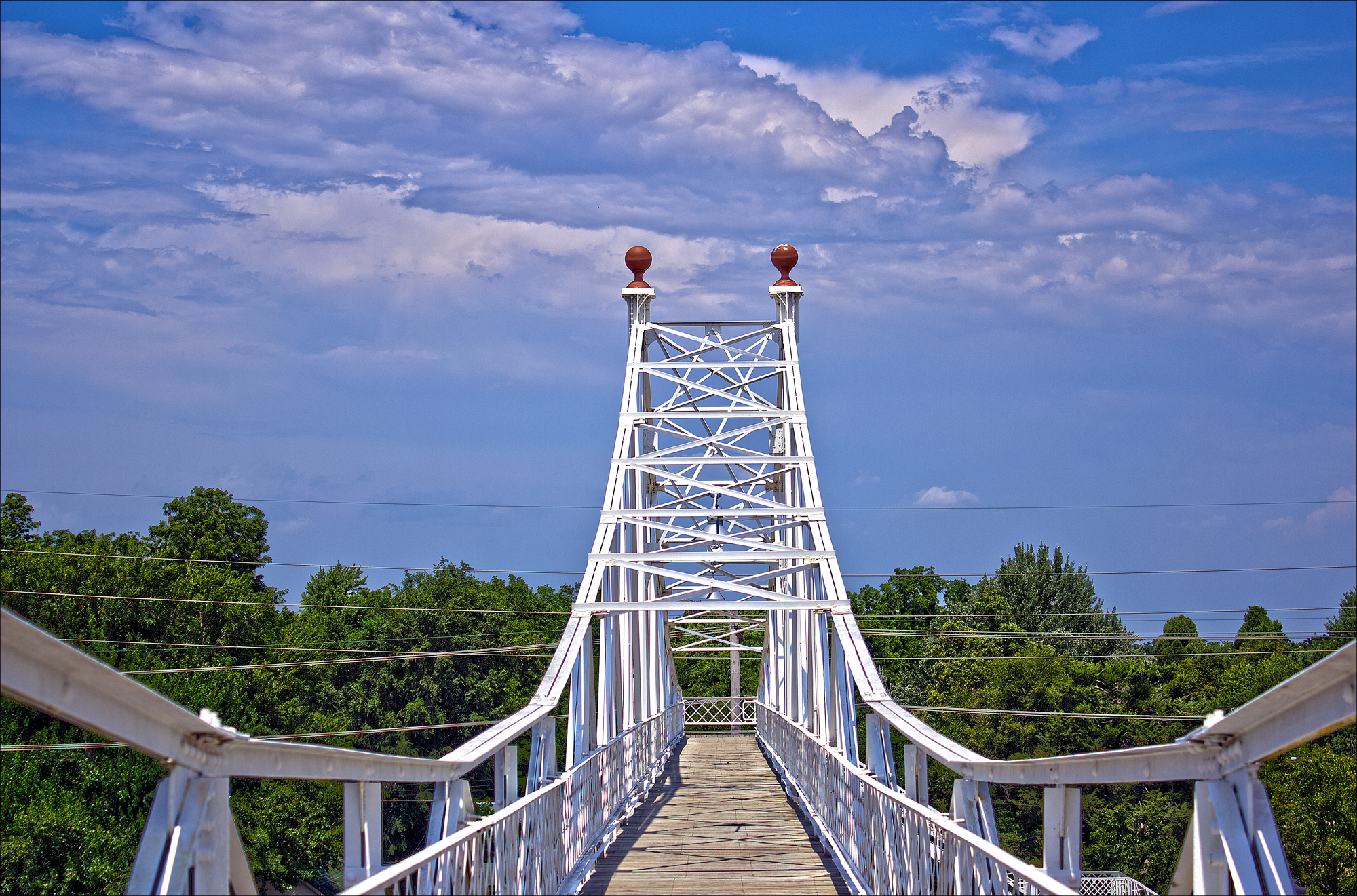

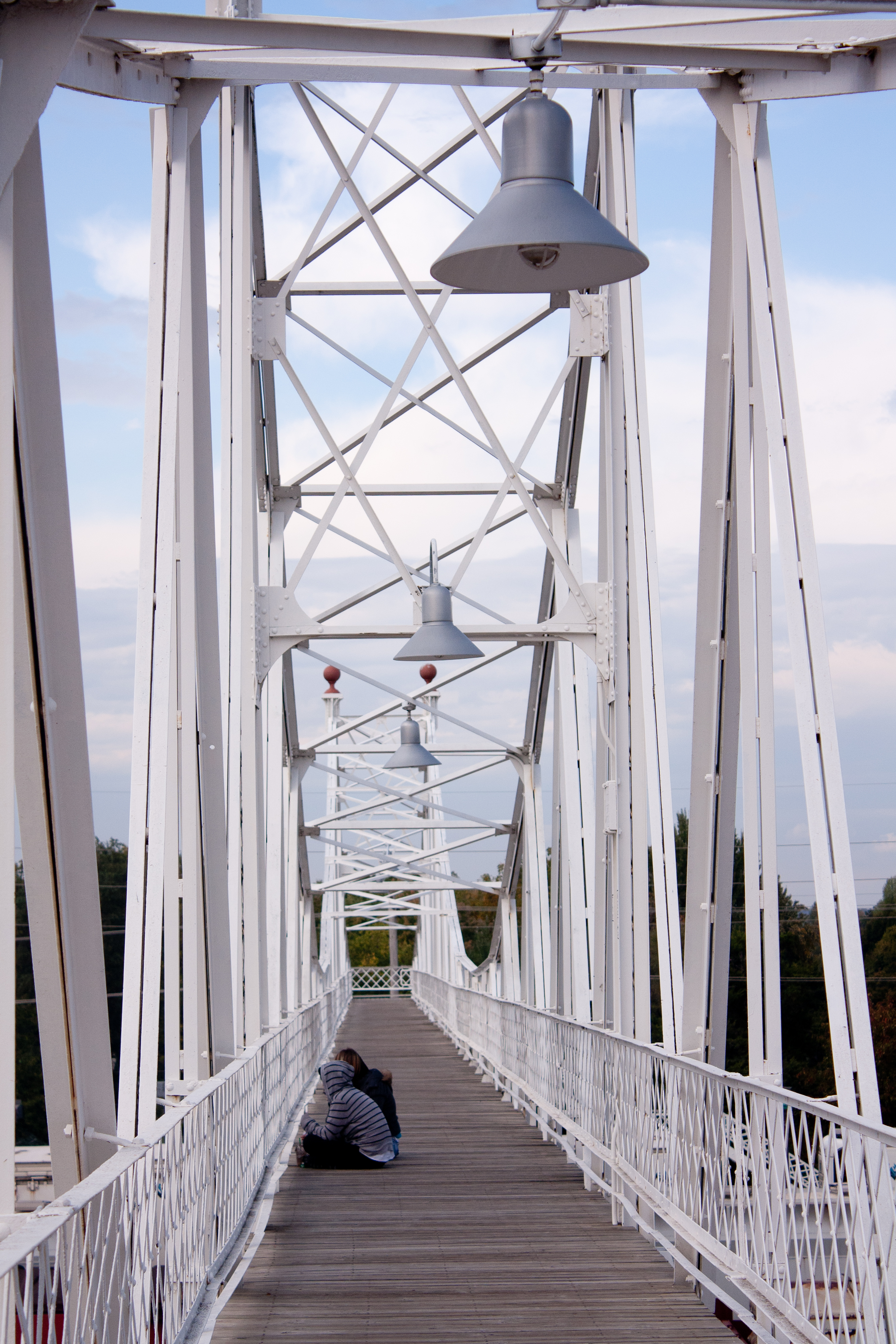

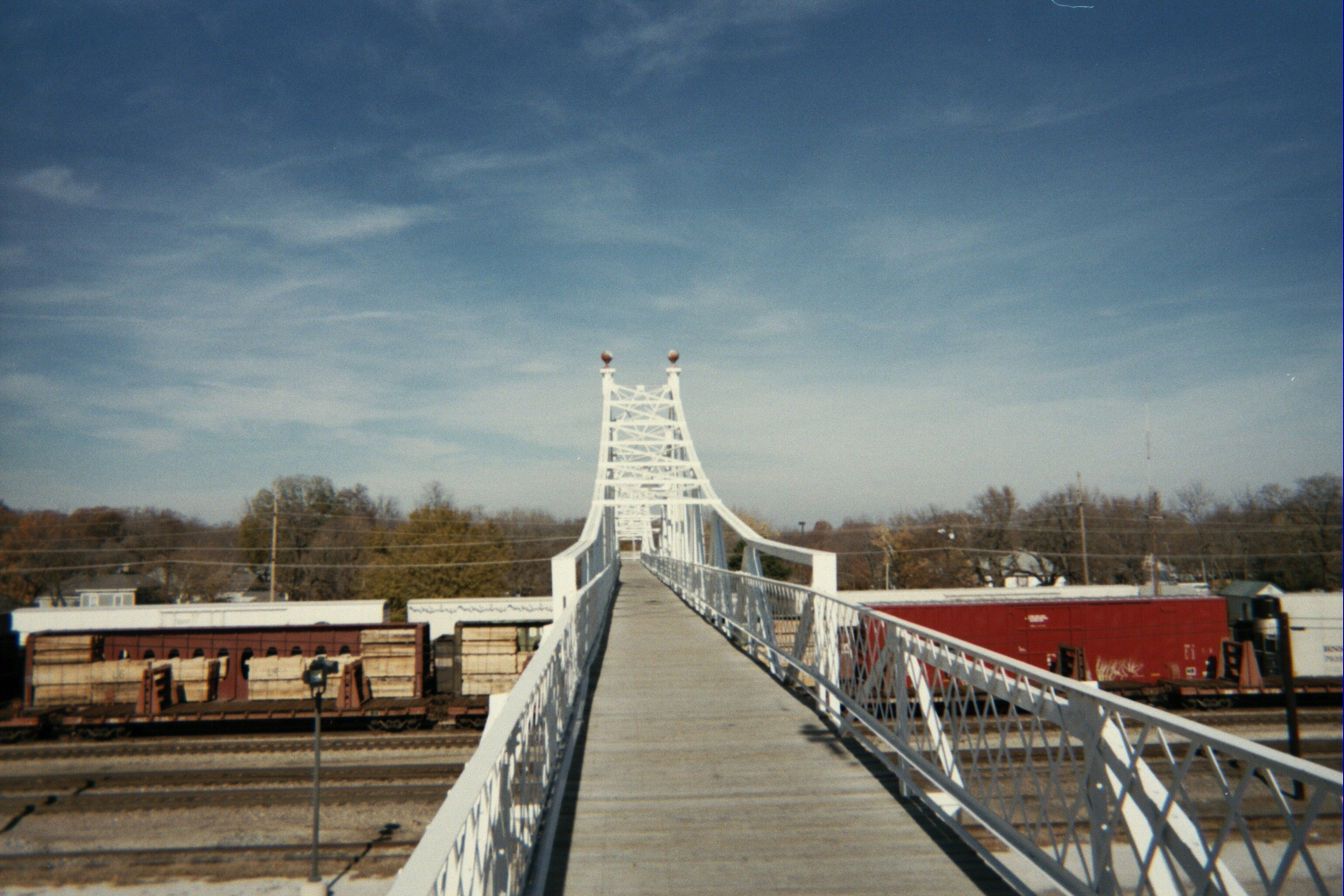
