= Sandy Creek Covered Bridge State Historic Site =

Historic covered bridge in Missouri, United States

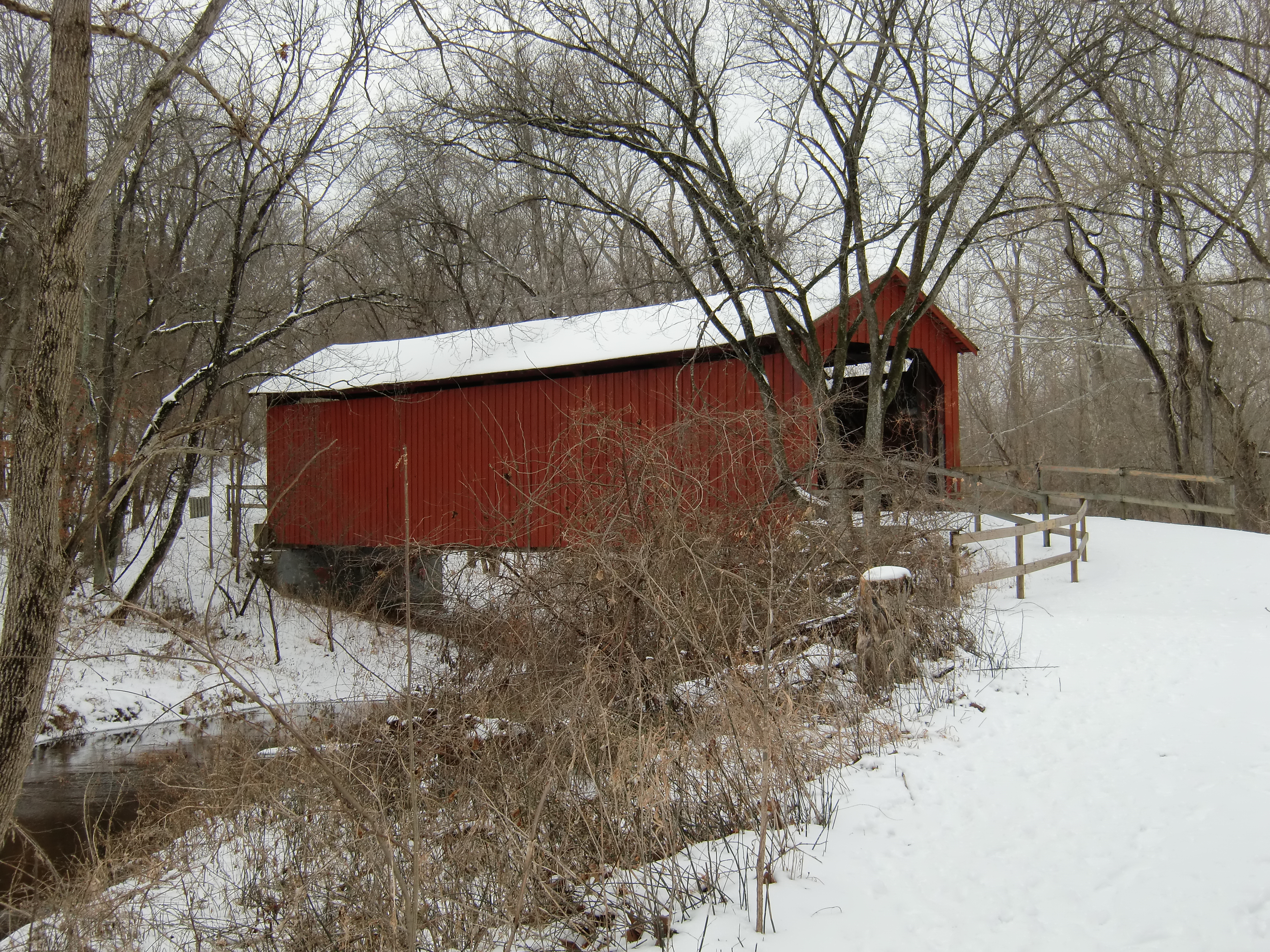

- Location within Missouri Location within the United States
- Location: Jefferson County, Missouri, United States
- Coordinates: 38°17′38″N 90°31′05″W
- Area: 211.78 acres (85.70 ha)
- Established: 1968
- Visitors: 168,608 (in 2022)
- Operator: Missouri Department of Natural Resources
- Website: Sandy Creek Covered Bridge State Historic Site
- Sandy Creek Covered Bridge
- U.S. National Register of Historic Places
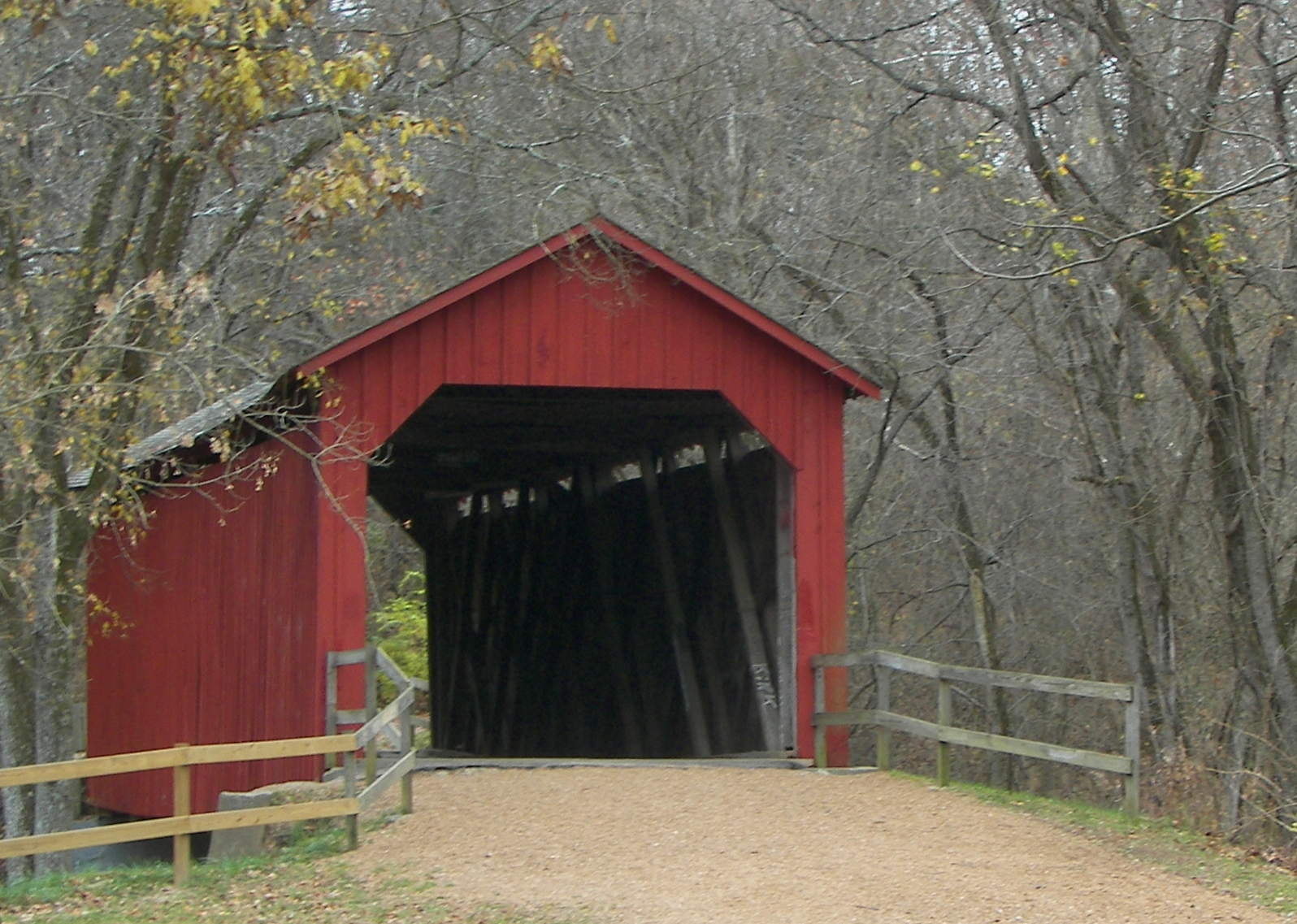
- Nearest city: Hillsboro, Missouri
- Area: 9.9 acres (4.0 ha)
- Built: 1872; rebuilt in 1886
- Built by: House Springs Big River Valley Macadamized & Gravel Road Co.; rebuilt by Henry Steffin
- Architectural style: Howe Truss
- NRHP reference No.: 70000337
- Added to NRHP: July 8, 1970

Sandy Creek Covered Bridge State Historic Site is a publicly owned property in Jefferson County, Missouri, administered by the Missouri Department of Natural Resources, preserving the Sandy Creek Covered Bridge. The bridge is one of four remaining covered bridges in Missouri, which once numbered about 30. It is a relatively rare example of a Howe truss bridge, one of three in Missouri. The covered bridge is named for Sandy Creek, which it crosses, and was added to the National Register of Historic Places in 1970.

== History ==
Jefferson County embarked on a building program following the American Civil War and paid John H. Morse $2000 for the construction of Sandy Creek Covered Bridge in 1872. Six bridges were built that year along the Old Lemay Ferry Road to connect the county seat of Hillsboro to St. Louis County. It was destroyed by high water in 1886, and was rebuilt for $899 by Henry Steffin using half of the original timbers and the original abutments. The bridge is 74.5 feet (22.7 m) long and 18 feet 10 inches (5.74 m) wide and has a height of 13 feet (4.0 m).

The bridge came under the protection of the state parks system when the state legislature passed an act in 1967 declaring all remaining covered bridges in the state to be state historic sites. Jefferson County released the bridge to the state in 1968; a major restoration project returned the bridge to its original appearance in 1984.

== Activities and amenities ==
The bridge is open to pedestrian traffic. The historic site offers picnic tables, toilet facilities, and an interpretive display.
