= Burfordville, Missouri =

- unincorporated community
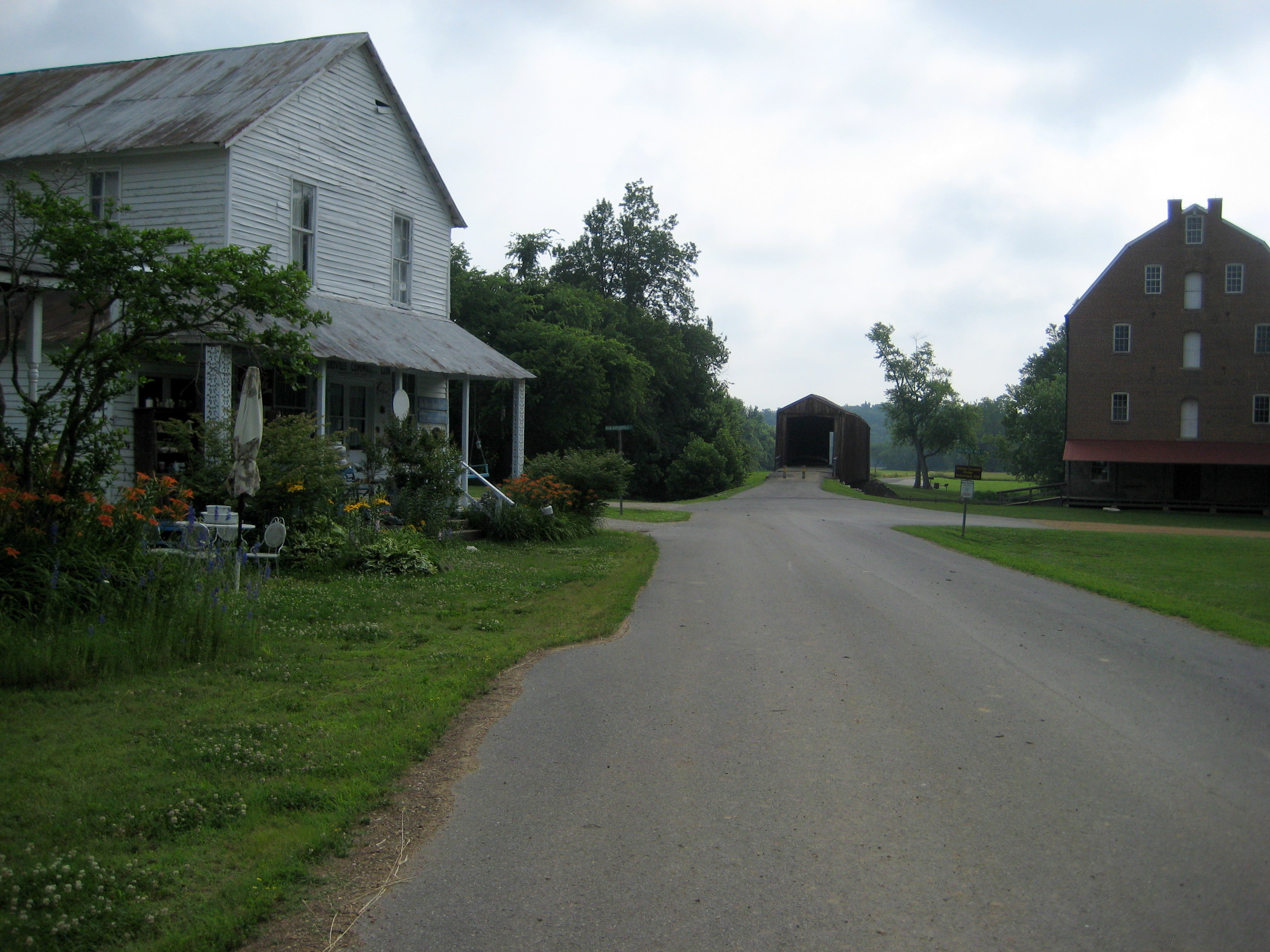
- The Bollinger Mill and Burfordville Covered Bridge in 2010

- Location of Cape Girardeau, Missouri
- Coordinates: 37°22′03″N 89°48′25″W
- Country: United States
- State: Missouri
- County: Cape Girardeau
- Township: Kinder Township

Area
  - Total: 0.34 sq mi (0.87 km^{2})
  - Land: 0.34 sq mi (0.87 km^{2})
  - Water: 0 sq mi (0.00 km^{2})
- Elevation: 404 ft (123 m)

Population (2020)
  - Total: 87
  - Density: 259.3/sq mi (100.12/km^{2})
- Time zone: UTC-6 (Central (CST))
  - Summer (DST): UTC-5 (CDT)
- ZIP code: 63739
- Area code: 573
- FIPS code: 29-09784
- GNIS feature ID: 715068

Burfordville is an unincorporated community in western Cape Girardeau County, Missouri, United States, on the banks of the Whitewater River. It is located five miles west of Jackson on Route 34. Bufordville is part of the Cape Girardeau–Jackson, MO-IL Metropolitan Statistical Area.

Bollinger Mill State Historic Site and Burfordville Covered Bridge are both listed on the National Register of Historic Places listings in Cape Girardeau County.

== Name ==
The town was formerly known simply as Bollinger's Mill as George Frederick Bollinger had built a mill on the site. The town was later named Burfordville for local pioneer John Burford.

== History ==
Major George Bollinger, a Swiss German immigrant, arrived in the area from North Carolina. He built the first mill on the Whitewater River in 1797. Bollinger was promised a large concession of land if he agreed to return to North Carolina and encouraged others to move to Missouri. He then returned to North Carolina and brought back with him to Missouri 20 other Swiss and German immigrant families. The village was incorporated in 1900.

== Geography ==
Burfordville is located on the Whitewater River, approximately eight miles southwest of Jackson, and is situated in the central part of Kinder Township.

== Demographics ==
Historical population
| Census | Pop. | Note | %± |
|---|---|---|---|
| 2020 | 87 | | — |
U.S. Decennial Census

Burfordville first appeared as a census designated place in the 2020 U.S. census.

== Education ==
It is in the Jackson R-2 School District, which operates Jackson High School.
